= Rafał =

- Pronunciation: Polish: [ˈra.faw]
- Gender: male
- Language: Polish

Origin
- Origin: Slavic
- Region of origin: Poland

Other names
- Related names: Raphael

Rafał (Polish: [ˈra.faw]) is a Polish masculine given name. It is the Polish form of the name Raphael.

== Notable people with the name ==
=== A-J ===
- Rafał Adamczyk (born 1974), Polish politician
- Rafał Ambrozik (born 1979), Polish politician
- Rafał Andraszak (born 1978), Polish footballer
- Rafał Antoniewski (born 1980), Polish chess grandmaster
- Rafał Augustyn (composer) (born 1951), Polish composer, pianist and writer
- Rafał Augustyn (racewalker) (born 1984), Polish race walker
- Rafał Augustyniak (born 1993), Polish footballer
- Rafał Berliński (born 1976), Polish footballer
- Rafał Betlejewski (born 1969), Polish artist
- Rafał Blechacz (born 1985), Polish classical pianist
- Rafał Bochenek (born 1986), Polish lawyer and politician
- Rafał Boguski (born 1984), Polish footballer
- Rafał Bruski (born 1962), Polish politician
- Rafał Brzoska (born 1977), Polish entrepreneur and investor
- Rafał Brzozowski (born 1981), Polish singer and TV presenter, represented Poland in the Eurovision Song Contest 2021
- Rafał Buszek (born 1987), Polish volleyball player
- Rafał Choynowski (born 1960), Polish equestrian
- Rafał Cieśla (born 1967), retired Polish athlete
- Rafał Czuper (born 1988), Polish table tennis player
- Rafał Dębski (born 1969), Polish writer
- Rafał Dobrowolski (born 1983), Polish archer
- Rafał Dobrucki (born 1976), Polish speedway rider
- Rafal E. Dunin-Borkowski (born 1969), British experimental physicist
- Rafał Dutkiewicz (born 1959), Polish politician and entrepreneur, mayor of Wrocław (2002-2018)
- Alojzy Rafał Estreicher (1786–1852), Polish physician
- Rafał Fedaczyński (born 1980), Polish race walker
- Rafał Feinmesser (1895–?), Polish chess master
- Rafał Furman (born 1985), Polish cyclist
- Rafał Gan-Ganowicz (1932–2002), Polish mercenary, journalist, and activist
- Rafał Gaweł, Polish director and anti-racism activist
- Rafał Gikiewicz (born 1987), Polish footballer
- Rafał Głażewski (born 1980), Polish sprint canoeist
- Rafał Gliński (born 1982), Polish handball player
- Rafał Górak (born 1973), Polish professional football manager
- Rafał Górski (1973–2010), Polish historian, writer and activist
- Rafał Grodzicki (born 1983), Polish footballer
- Rafał Grotowski (born 1973), Polish field hockey player
- Rafał Grupiński (born 1952), Polish politician
- Rafał Grzelak (born 1988), Polish footballer
- Rafał Grzelak (born 1982), Polish footballer
- Rafał Grzyb (born 1983), Polish footballer
- Rafał Hadziewicz (1803–1883), Polish painter
- Rafał Hawel (born 1984), Polish badminton player
- Rafał Hejmej (born 1980), Polish rower
- Rafał Jackiewicz (born 1977), Polish professional boxer
- Rafał Jaki, Polish executive producer and writer
- Rafał Jakubowicz (born 1974), Polish visual artist
- Rafał Janicki (born 1992), Polish footballer
- Rafał Jaworski (born 1973), Polish historian and archivist
- Rafał Jewtuch (born 1973), Polish snooker player
- Rafał Jonkisz (born 1997), Polish model, acrobat and television personality
- Rafał Jędrszczyk (born 1978), Polish football player and manager

=== K-P ===
- Rafał Kaczmarczyk (born 1972), Polish footballer
- Rafał Kaczor (born 1982), Polish amateur boxer
- Rafał Kamiński (born 1990), known as Ralph Kaminski, Polish singer-songwriter and record producer
- Rafał Karczmarz (born 1999), Polish speedway rider
- Rafal Kiernicki (1912–1995), Ukrainian Catholic prelate
- Rafał Kobryń (born 1999), Polish footballer
- Rafał Korc (born 1982), Polish Paralympic athlete
- Rafał Kosik (born 1971), Polish science fiction writer
- Rafał Kosznik (born 1983), Polish footballer
- Rafał Kownacki (born 1980), Polish lawyer
- Rafał Kozielewski (born 1976), Polish judoka
- Rafał Król (born 1989), Polish footballer
- Rafał Królikowski (born 1966), Polish actor
- Rafał Kubacki (born 1967), Polish judoka
- Rafał Kujawa (born 1988), Polish footballer
- Rafał Kuptel (born 1976), Polish handball player
- Rafał Kurmański (1982–2004), Polish speedway rider
- Rafał Kurzawa (born 1993), Polish footballer
- Rafał Kwieciński (born 1975), Polish footballer
- Rafał Lasocki (born 1975), Polish professional footballer
- Rafał Lemkin (1900–1959), Polish lawyer
- Rafał Lepel (born 1990), retired Polish biathlete
- Rafał Leśkiewicz (born 1977), Polish historian and manager
- Rafał Leszczyński (1526–1592) (1526–1592), voivode of the Brześć Kujawski Voivodeship from 1545 to 1550
- Rafał Leszczyński (1579–1636) (1579–1636), Polish-Lithuanian noble and Imperial count
- Rafał Leszczyński (1650–1703) (1650–1703), Polish nobleman, father of King of Poland Stanisław I Leszczyński
- Rafał Leszczyński (footballer) (born 1992), Polish footballer
- Rafał Majka (born 1989), Polish bicycle racer
- Rafał Makowski (born 1996), Polish footballer
- Rafał Malczewski (1892–1965), Polish painter and author
- Rafał Maślak (born 1989), Polish model
- Rafał Milach (born 1978), Polish visual artist and photographer
- Rafał Muchacki (born 1955), Polish politician
- Rafał Murawski (born 1981), Polish footballer
- Rafał Niżnik (born 1974), Polish footballer
- Rafał Okoniewski (born 1980), Polish speedway rider
- Rafał Olbiński (born 1943), painter, illustrator and designer
- Rafał Omelko (born 1989), retired Polish athlete
- Rafał Pankowski (born 1976), Polish sociologist and political scientist
- Rafał Patyra (born 1974), Polish sports journalist
- Rafał Pawlak (born 1970), Polish football player and manager
- Rafał Perl (born 1981), Polish diplomat
- Rafał Pietrzak (born 1992), Polish footballer
- Rafał Piotrowski (footballer) (1974–2024), Polish footballer
- Rafał Piotrowski (musician) (born 1985), Polish death metal vocalist
- Rafał Piszcz (1940–2012), Polish sprint canoeist
- Rafał Poborski (born 1976), Polish diplomat
- Rafał Przybylski (born 1991), Polish handball player

=== R-Z ===
- Rafał Ratajczyk (born 1983), Polish racing cyclist
- Rafał Reszelewski (born 1996), Polish astronomical observer
- Rafał Romanowski (born 1978), Polish politician
- Rafał Rosolski (born 1991), Polish canoeist
- Rafał Ruta (born 1972), Polish footballer
- Rafał Sarnecki (born 1990), Polish cyclist
- Rafał Siadaczka (born 1972), Polish footballer
- Rafał Siemaszko (born 1986), Polish footballer
- Rafał Siemianowski (born 1980), Polish civil servant and diplomat
- Rafał Sikora (born 1987), Polish race walker
- Rafał Skarbek-Malczewski (born 1982), Polish snowboarder
- Rafał Śliż (born 1983), Polish ski jumper
- Rafał Ślusarz (born 1962), Polish politician
- Rafał Smoliński (born 1977), Polish rower
- Rafał Sonik (born 1966), Polish rally driver
- Rafał Sroka (born 1970), Polish ice hockey player
- Rafał Stradomski (born 1958), Polish composer pianist, and writer
- Rafał Stroiński (born 1964), Polish footballer
- Rafał Strączek (born 1999), Polish footballer
- Rafał Syska (born 1974), Polish film historian and writer
- Rafał Sznajder (1972–2014), Polish fencer
- Rafał Szombierski (born 1982), Polish speedway rider
- Rafał Szukała (born 1971), Polish swimmer, Olympic silver medallist
- Rafał Szukiel (born 1976), Polish sailor
- Rafał Szwed (born 1973), Polish footballer
- Rafał Szymura (born 1995), Polish volleyball player
- Rafał of Tarnów, Polish nobleman
- Rafał Taubenschlag (1881–1958), Polish historian of law, specialist in Roman law and papyrology
- Rafał Trzaskowski (born 1972), Polish politician serving as the Mayor of Warsaw
- Rafał Ulatowski (born 1973), Polish football manager
- Rafał de Weryha-Wysoczański (born 1975), Polish art historian, genealogist and writer
- Rafał Wiechecki (born 1978), Polish politician
- Rafał Wieruszewski (born 1981), Polish sprinter
- Rafał Wilk (born 1974), Polish Paralympic handcyclist
- Rafał Wnuk (born 1967), Polish historian
- Rafał Wojaczek (1945–1971), Polish poet
- Rafał Wójcik (1972–2025), Polish long-distance runner
- Rafał Wołczecki (born 1996), Polish boxer
- Rafał Wolski (born 1992), Polish footballer
- Rafał Wolsztyński (born 1994), Polish professional footballer
- Rafał Woś (born 1982), Polish journalist and writer
- Rafał Włodarczyk (born 1995), Polish footballer
- Rafał Zaborowski (born 1994), Polish footballer
- Rafał Zawierucha (born 1986), Polish actor
- Rafal Zielinski (born 1957), Canadian director, producer and screenwriter
- Rafał A. Ziemkiewicz (born 1964), Polish author and publicist

== See also ==
- Rafal (disambiguation)
