= Łódź Power Station (EC1) =

Former EC1 power plant in Łódź

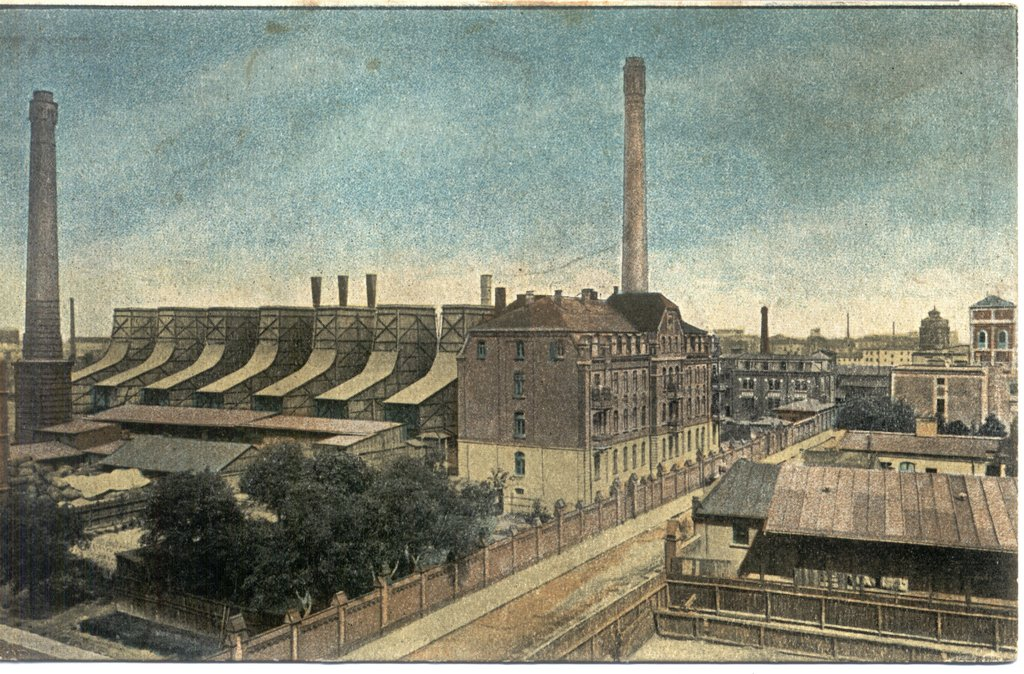
Postcard showing the Łódź Power Station no.1 (EC1), early 2oth century

The Łódź Power Station (EC1) was a municipal power plant in Łódź, Poland, located at 1/3 Targowa Street. It began operation in 1907 as the city's first power plant and was later expanded and converted into a combined heat and power plant. Following its closure at the beginning of the 21st century, the historic complex was revitalised and now forms part of EC1 Łódź – City of Culture, a centre for culture, science and education.

== History ==
Construction of the EC1 cooling tower

Construction of the power station began in May 1906. The works were interrupted several times by strikes during the Revolution of 1905–1907, and the first generator was connected to the municipal electricity grid on 18 September 1907. The plant was primarily intended to supply electricity to Łódź's rapidly developing textile industry, with a smaller share used for street and residential lighting. The original complex included the Art Nouveau Machine Hall, which was expanded in 1908 and 1912–1913.

The plant expanded rapidly before the First World War, increasing its generating capacity from 2.1 MW in 1907 to 21.1 MW in 1913. After the war, the municipal government acquired a 20% stake in the power station. A major expansion followed in 1929–1930, when a new section known as the New Central was built on the adjacent site of a former machine factory and foundry. The modernist complex included new boiler houses, a pump house and a control room, and a Brown Boveri turbogenerator was put into operation in 1930. By 1939, the plant's generating capacity had reached 100 MW.

During the Second World War, a fire in 1943 destroyed the roof of the Machine Hall and damaged one of the generating sets. After the war, the plant was incorporated into plans to develop Łódź's district heating system and in 1953 began producing steam for industrial use. In 1960, the Łódź Power Station was merged with the newly built Power and Heating Plant No. 2 to form a single municipal enterprise.

Operations of the power station ceased in 2001, after the development of newer combined heat and power plants in Łódź had reduced its role in the city's energy system. Following the construction of EC3 and EC4, EC1 operated mainly as a peak-load plant supporting the district heating system, while the demand for industrial steam and electricity gradually declined. After its closure, the abandoned complex deteriorated and its buildings were eventually transferred to the city, which began their revitalisation and adaptation for new cultural and educational functions.

== Current use ==
Projection mapping on the Brown Boveri turbogenerator, machine room, EC1 Science and Technology Centre, 2026

The former power station has been adapted for cultural, educational and entertainment purposes as part of EC1 Łódź – City of Culture, a cultural institution established by the Łódź City Council in 2008. The revitalised complex combines preserved industrial architecture and historic equipment with contemporary exhibition and cultural facilities. The eastern part houses the Planetarium, the National Centre for Film Culture and the Centre for Comics and Interactive Narrative, as well as spaces for exhibitions and cultural events. The historic Machine Hall, dating from the first years of the power station, is used as an exhibition and concert venue.

The western part of the complex houses the EC1 Science and Technology Centre, whose permanent exhibition was designed around the surviving infrastructure of the former power station. The Energy Processing route occupies the historic boiler room, engine room, control room and other preserved spaces, using original or reconstructed machinery to explain the production and transmission of electricity and heat. Historic boilers, pumps, control equipment and a Brown Boveri turbogenerator remain in their original architectural setting, while archival material, interactive exhibits and multimedia installations supplement the industrial fabric of the building. A projection mapping displayed on the historic Brown Boveri turbo-generator visualises its construction and operation, effectively turning the preserved machine itself into part of the exhibition. The exhibition thus uses the former power station not merely as a setting, but as a teaching aid, through which the history and technology of the site are presented.

== Heritage status ==
The former Łódź Power Station is a listed historic monument and an important example of Łódź's industrial heritage. The historic power station complex at 1/3 Targowa Street, including its machine halls, boiler houses, offices, chimney and surrounding area, is entered in the Polish Registry of Cultural Property under no. A/35. The protected complex preserves the industrial architecture and infrastructure of the historic power station.
