= EC1 Science and Technology Centre Planetarium in Łódź =

Planetarium in Łódź

The EC1 Science and Technology Centre Planetarium is a planetarium in Łódź, operating within the EC1 Łódź – City of Culture complex at 1/3 Targowa Street in Łódź. It was designed as part of the revitalization project of the historic EC1 power station complex and opened to the public in January 2016. The planetarium is located in the building of the National Centre for Film Culture. Its program is developed by the team of the EC1 Science and Technology Centre in Łódź.

== History ==
Construction of the planetarium began as part of the adaptation of the EC1 East complex for cultural and educational purposes within the wider revitalization of the former Łódź Power Station (currently, the EC1 Łódź – City of Culture). The facility was officially inaugurated on 8 January 2016. Administratively, the planetarium forms part of EC1 Łódź – City of Culture and operates as a department of the EC1 Science and Technology Centre in Łódź.

== Description ==
The EC1 Planetarium is equipped with a 14-metre spherical projection dome and an 8K digital projection system using six high-resolution projectors. Images are projected across the entire dome at a total resolution of approximately 32 million pixels. Screenings are accompanied by a Dolby Surround 5.1 multi-channel sound system. The auditorium has seating for 110 visitors. At the time of its opening, it was considered one of the most technologically advanced planetariums of its kind in Central and Eastern Europe.

The planetarium's programme includes astronomical presentations, popular science shows, fulldome films about astronomy and space exploration, documentary productions related to the history of science and the natural world, as well as music concerts, performances and audiovisual events making use of the dome's immersive environment. The planetarium also offers educational programs for schools, workshops, and outreach events promoting astronomy and the natural sciences.

The EC1 Planetarium also produces original fulldome productions that are presented at international festivals. In 2025, Gustav Holst: The Planets, created by Natalia Oliwiak and Michał Kata, which combines Gustav Holst's symphonic suite with immersive visualisations, received the Best Fulldome Show award at the Macon Film Festival in the United States.

== Awards and recognition ==
In 2016, the EC1 Planetarium won first place in the nationwide "7 New Wonders of Poland" competition organized by National Geographic Traveler Poland.
