= I miss you, Jew! =

Artistic intervention in Poland

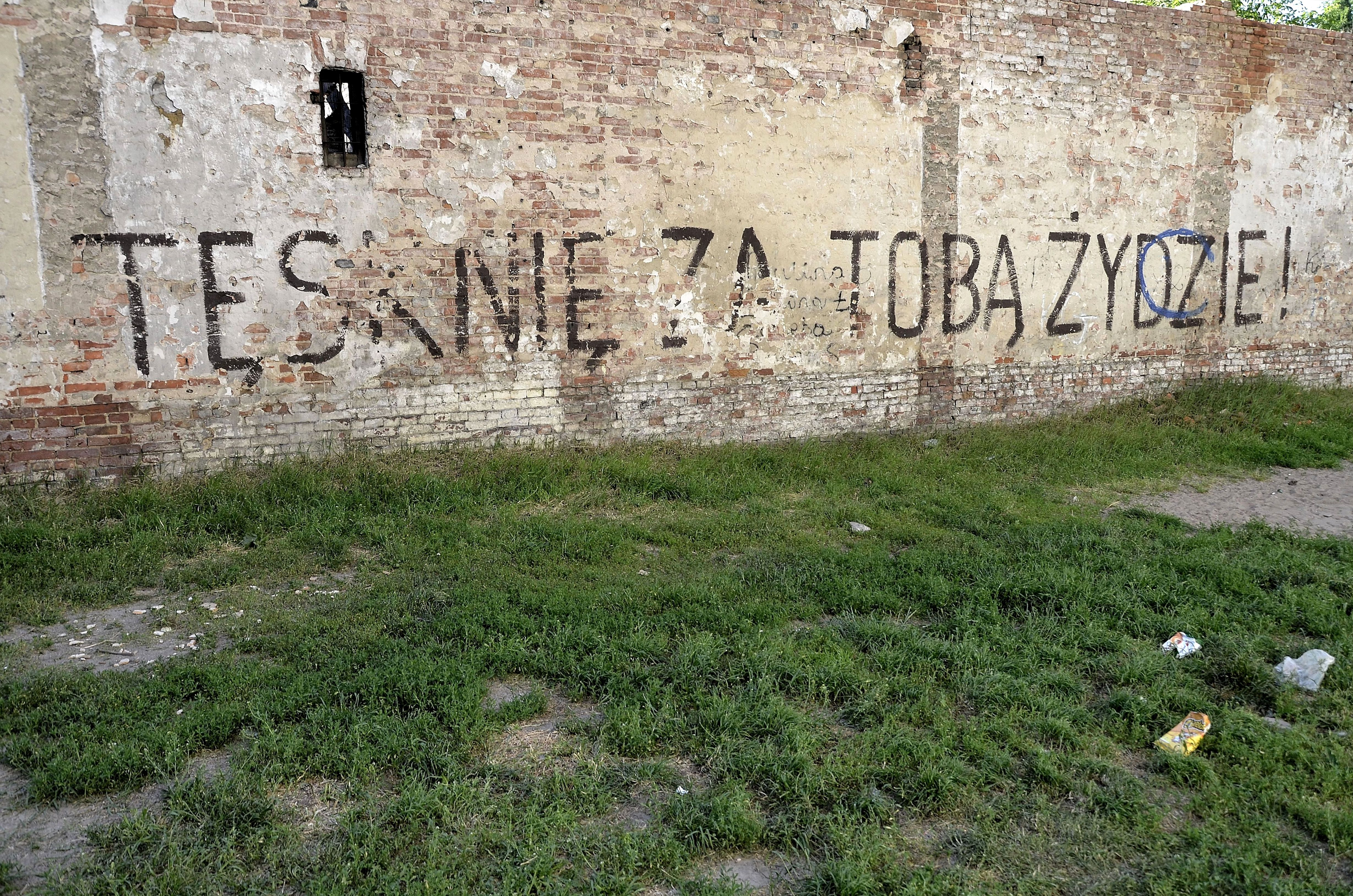
The inscription "I miss you, Jew" at ul. Brzeska 8 in Warsaw

I miss you, Jew! (Polish: Tęsknię za tobą, Żydzie) was a nationwide performative action organized by Polish artist Rafał Betlejewski, aimed at expressing the longing of Poles for Polish Jews, who have largely disappeared from the country following the events of the Holocaust. As part of the initiative Betlejewski painted the slogan "I miss you, Jew" on public walls and encouraged others to copy this gesture. Places where this slogan showed up included Piotrkowska Street in Łódź, as well as along Brezeska Street in Warsaw and in the town of Jedwabne. All of these sites have significance to the once-vibrant Jewish community in Poland; Piotrkowska Street in Łódź was the site of roundups and pogroms during the Holocaust, while Brezeska Street in Warsaw once formed part of the boundary for the Warsaw Ghetto. Jedwabne was the site of a pogrom perpetrated by the local Polish population in 1941.

At the same time, the artist asked Poles to photograph themselves in public space, in places once associated with Polish Jews, along with an empty chair and a kippah on it. He also actively sought memories of Jews who were murdered in the Holocaust. Another component of the project took place on 11 July 2010, the day after the 69th anniversary of the Jedwabne pogrom, under the name Płonie stodola, (transl. The barn is burning). Betlejewski set fire to a specially constructed barn in the village of Zawada, but only after he placed symbolic white cards from people who were "burdened with unkind thoughts toward Jews".

Betlejewski said of the project, "I think that for a Pole it is like exploring the subconscious mind, which is a source of fears, phobias, psychoses but on the other hand wonderful dreams. As a Pole, I would like to realize what is hidden in my oblivion, discover the area of what I call active forgetfulness and which was a conscious political and cultural activity." In 2010, he was also quoted as saying to the newspaper Gazeta Wyborcza, "I want to reclaim the word 'Jew,' snatch it from anti-Semites, who in this country are the only ones using it freely ... I aim to build a platform used to express positive emotions towards the people known as the Jews."

To document the action, Betlejewski created a website with a virtual archive where users can present memories of Jews in Poland, express their emotions associated with these memories, and also post photographs related to the initiative.

== Controversy ==
In April 2016, unidentified people blacked out the word "Jew" on a slogan Betlejewski had painted in the Powiśle neighborhood of Warsaw. Although he had received permission from the owner to paint on that particular wall, Betlejewski has been criticized by other municipal authorities in the past, who perceived his paintings as vandalism.

In 2019, he was fined by the District Court in Węgrów with a fine of PLN 1,100 for illegally hanging a banner with the slogan of shares on the Węgrów market.
