= Kownacki =

Kownacki (Polish pronunciation: [kɔvˈnat͡ski]; feminine: Kownacka; plural: Kownaccy) is a Polish surname. It may refer to:

- Adam Kownacki (born 1989), Polish-American boxer
- Dawid Kownacki (born 1997), Polish association football player
- Edmund Knoll-Kownacki (1891–1953), Polish military officer
- Gabriela Kownacka (1952–2010), Polish actress
- Maria Kownacka (1894–1982), Polish writer
- Rafał Kownacki (born 1980), Polish lawyer
