= Rafale (disambiguation) =

The Rafale is a French fighter aircraft by Dassault.

Rafale may also refer to:

- Caudron C.460 Rafale, a 1934 racing aircraft
- Renault Rafale, an SUV named after the 1934 racing aircraft

== See also ==
- Ráfales, a city in Aragon, Spain
- Rafale deal controversy, a political controversy in India regarding a purchase deal of Dassault Rafales
- Raphale Evans (born 1990), an English footballer
- Rafael Advanced Defense Systems, an Israeli defense technology company
- Rafal (disambiguation)
- Raphael (disambiguation)
