= Błażej Moder =

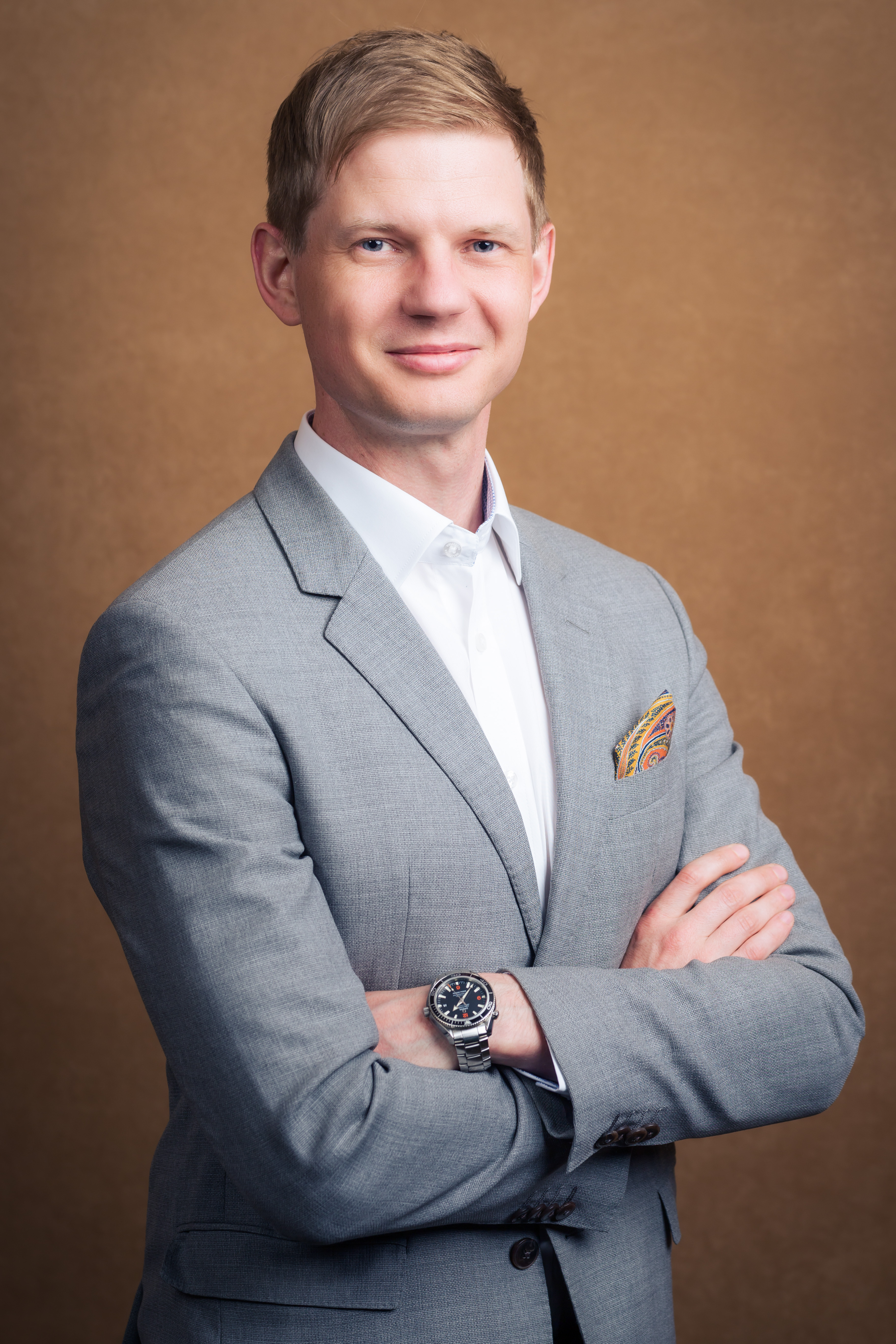
- Błażej Moder in 2021
- Born: January 21, 1982 (age 44); Pabianice
- Education: University of Łódź, Harvard University, SGH Warsaw School of Economics
- Occupation: Public sector manager
- Title: Director of EC1 Łódź - City of Culture
- Spouse: Jaga Moder

Błażej Moder (born January 21, 1982 in Pabianice) is a Polish public sector manager, responsible for the implementation of large infrastructure projects including the New Centre of Łódź program. Since 2015, he has been the director of EC1 Łódź – City of Culture, an interdisciplinary cultural institution run by the City of Łódź and the Ministry of Culture and National Heritage of Poland.

== Biography ==
=== Education ===
Błażej Moder completed his Master's degree in International Relations at the University of Łódź Faculty of International and Political Studies in 2006. In 2025, he graduated from the Harvard Kennedy School at Harvard University, earning a Master of Public Administration degree as a Mason Fellow. He also completed doctoral studies at the Collegium of Socio-Economics of the SGH Warsaw School of Economics in 2010 (without obtaining a doctoral degree).

== Career ==
He began his professional career in 2006 at the Łódź Special Economic Zone, where he handled investment management processes in the Łódź Voivodeship. Between 2007 and 2011 he was associated with the Łódź Regional Development Agency – initially serving as Vice President of the Management Board, and from 2008 as President of the Management Board. His responsibilities included implementing support programs for small and medium-sized enterprises in the Łódź Voivodeship, financed by the European Union. In 2011-2012 he was a member of the Management Board of the Łódź Infrastructure Company.

=== New Centre of Łódź ===
In 2011, Moder assumed the position of Plenipotentiary of the Mayor of Łódź for the New Centre of Łódź program. From 2012 to 2015, he served as Director of New Centre of Łódź Authority, the municipal organisational unit responsible for coordinating the New Centre of Łódź program, which included the reconstruction of the Łódź Fabryczna railway station, the construction of a multimodal transport hub, the renewal of the EC1 Łódź – City of Culture complex (at the time the largest urban redevelopment project in Poland), and the implementation of other infrastructural and urban projects.

=== EC1 Łódź – City of Culture ===
In 2014, he assumed the position of plenipotentiary responsible for managing the EC1 Łódź – City of Culture institution. In 2015, he was appointed director of this institution for a five-year term. In 2020, he was reappointed director for a three-year term, and in 2023 for a third, five-year term. During Moder's tenure at the institution, the redevelopment of the former EC1 power plant complex was carried out, and the institution's programming and educational activities were expanded. During this period, the EC1 Science and Technology Center, the EC1 Planetarium, the Street of the Elements, the Centre for Comics and Interactive Narrative, and the National Centre for Film Culture were opened and began operating.

== Civic engagement ==
Błażej Moder has been associated with the Civic Development Forum Foundation (Polish: Forum Obywatelskiego Rozwoju) since 2008 and has served as a member of its board since 2013. Since 2021, he has served as chairman of the board of the Economic Freedom Foundation. He is a member of the Mont Pelerin Society, the Society of Polish Economists, the Association of Alumni of the US Department of State Exchange Programs, and the Harvard Club of Poland.

== Distinctions and honors ==
In 2014, Moder was recognised in the "40 under 40 European Young Leaders" (EYL40) ranking organized by the Friends of Europe Foundation think tank.
