= Rafał Piotrowski =

Rafał Piotrowski can refer to:

- Rafał Piotrowski (musician), Polish lead vocalist for the band Decapitated
- Rafał Piotrowski (footballer) (1974–2024), Polish footballer
