= EC1 Machine Hall in Łódź =

EC1 Machine Hall in Łódź, 2026

The EC1 Machine Hall in Łódź is a historic hall of the former municipal power plant in Łódź, forming part of the EC1 complex at 1/3 Targowa Street. It was built in connection with the commissioning of the Łódź Power Plant in 1907 and is regarded as an industrial building combining architectural Modernism with Art Nouveau elements. It is part of the EC1 Łódź – City of Culture complex.

The building retains historic elements of its original equipment, including a travelling crane, a staircase with a clock, decorative borders and tiles. After the power plant ceased operation, the Machine Hall was adapted for new uses. It is now part of the EC1 Łódź – City of Culture complex and serves as an exhibition and concert space as well as a venue for cultural events.

== History ==
Construction of the power plant began on 25 May 1906, and the plant was commissioned in September 1907. The Machine Hall was built as part of the first stage of the power plant's construction and was subsequently expanded in 1908 and in 1912–1913. The expansion was related to the rapid increase in the plant's capacity: in 1907 it amounted to 2.1 MW, while by 1913 it had reached 21.1 MW.

During World War II, part of the complex was damaged by a fire in 1943, after which reconstruction and modernization works were carried out. Following further transformations of the power plant in the 20th century, the Machine Hall retained its structure and characteristic elements of its equipment. The power plant ceased operation in 2000, and in the first decade of the 21st century the revitalization of the complex and its adaptation to new uses began. The Machine Hall was preserved as one of the most important elements of EC1's historic buildings and adapted for cultural functions.

== Architecture ==
The Machine Hall is a two-storey masonry building with a single-space interior, constructed in stages between 1907 and 1914. Its volume has survived in an unchanged form; in 1943, the roof over the machine hall was destroyed by fire. The architect of the building is unknown. The building is distinguished by its brick facades. The eastern facade is articulated by a central risalit containing a pentagonal staircase, while the window and door openings are topped with segmental arches and framed with decorative surrounds. The southern facade has an elaborate rhythm of bays, pilasters, blind arcades, friezes and cornices.

The interior retains numerous elements of the original decoration, including ceramic tiles and wall cladding, a green frieze and ceramic cornice, a geometric frieze in the vestibule, and stucco decoration with rosettes on the ceiling. The building also retains metal stairs, decorative railings with Art Nouveau motifs, Art Nouveau door joinery, flooring and the platform of the former switchgear. The hall also contains a preserved and restored overhead crane, manufactured by the K. Rudzki and Co. Metal Industry Association in Warsaw, recalling the building's original function.

The adaptation of the Machine Hall did not involve major structural changes or significant alterations to the building's external form. The historic roof structure was retained and provided with an additional covering, while a mezzanine was introduced into the interior. Conservation works were also carried out on the facades and historic interior decoration.

== Revitalisation ==
The Machine Hall after renovation, 2013

After the EC1 power plant ceased operation in 2000, the complex gradually lost its original function and fell into disrepair. In 2003, it was transferred to the City of Łódź. In May 2008, a project to revitalise and adapt the complex for cultural and artistic purposes began, linked to the New Centre of Łódź programme. The works included the modernisation and conservation of historic buildings and their adaptation to new uses. In the case of the Machine Hall, its historic volume, spatial layout and decorative elements were preserved, and the adaptation did not involve significant structural alterations.

The revitalisation of EC1 formed part of the wider transformation of post-industrial areas in central Łódź. The project combined the preservation of the complex's historic fabric with the introduction of new cultural, educational and recreational functions. Sowińska-Heim identifies EC1 as an example of an adaptation in which the historic form and a substantial part of the original elements were preserved while new solutions responding to contemporary use were introduced.

== Cultural uses ==
29th International Festival of Comics and Games, Machine Hall

Following its adaptation, the Machine Hall has served as an exhibition and concert space. It is also used for film screenings, theatre performances, festivals, artistic events, meetings and other events. The programme documentation of the National Centre for Film Culture envisaged the organisation of temporary exhibitions, film screenings, theatre performances and concerts in the hall.

Events held in the Machine Hall have included the exhibition Leonardo da Vinci – Energy of the Mind in 2017–2018. In 2024, the Machine Hall hosted a screening of the film The Peasants (2023), followed by a multimedia concert by Łukasz L.U.C. Rostkowski. The building is also used as a venue for major cultural and artistic events.
