= EC1 Łódź – City of Culture =

- EC1 Łódź – Miasto Kultury
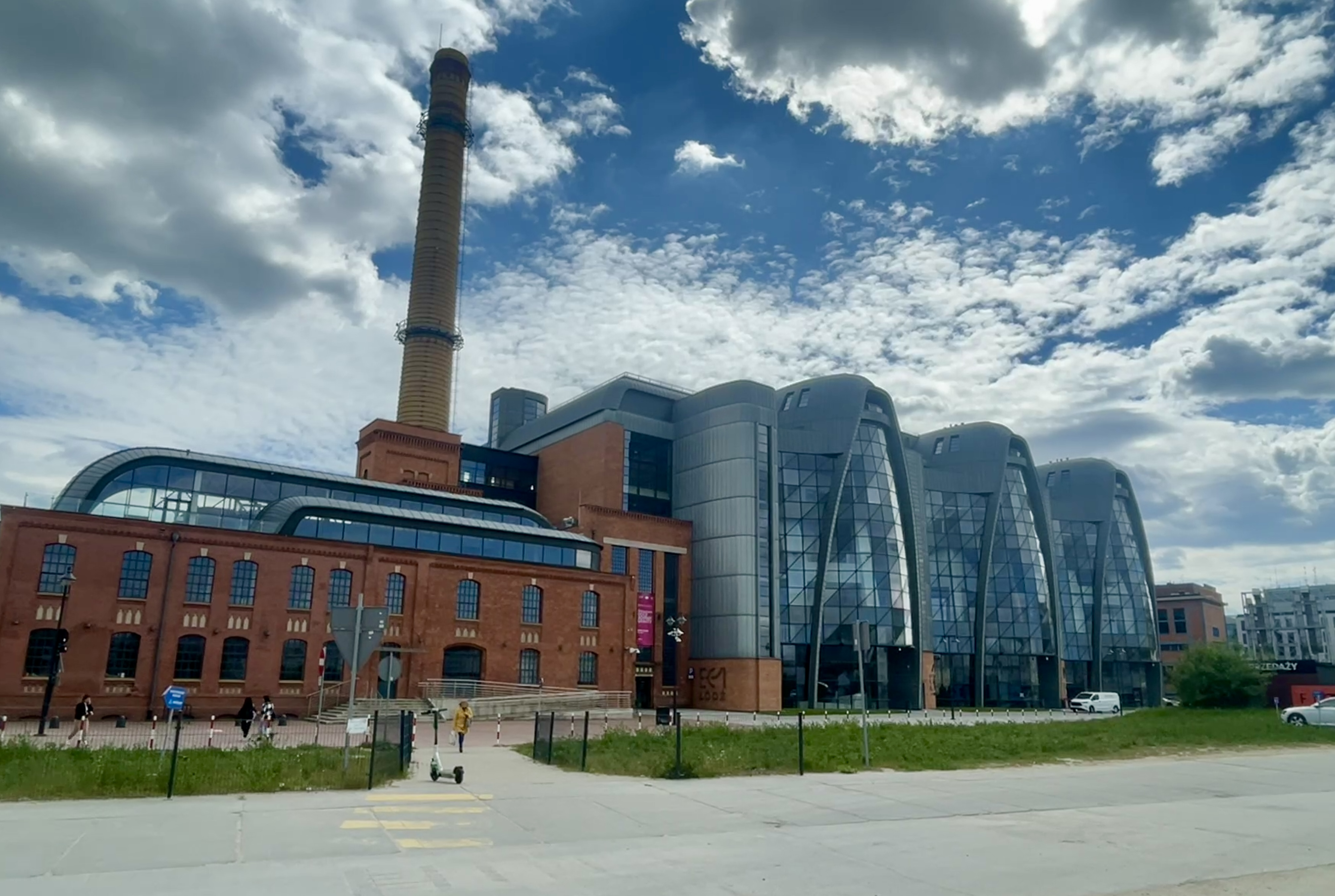
- EC1 seen from Łódź Fabryczna, 2025
- Established: 2008
- Location: Tuwima 46, Łódź, Poland
- Coordinates: 51.7676°N 19.4696°E
- Type: General interest
- Director: Błażej Moder
- Website: ec1lodz.pl

EC1 Łódź – City of Culture is a cultural institution in Łódź, located within the revitalised urban complex which previously housed the first power plant in the city. Buildings belonging to the power plant have been revitalized and adapted to serve as centres of culture and science. The institution comprises the EC1 Science and Technology Centre, the EC1 Planetarium, the National Centre for Film Culture, and the Centre for Comics and Interactive Narrative, as well as the Street of the Elements – a children's museum of the sciences. The EC1 Łódź – City of Culture is an institution run by the City of Łódź and the Ministry of Culture and National Heritage of Poland.

The EC1 complex is located at 1/3 Targowa Street in Łódź, next to the Łódź Fabryczna railway station, within the New Centre of Łódź area; the institution's offices are located nearby at Tuwima 46. Individual centres are specialised educational and exhibition venues, functioning as departments of the main institution and located on the grounds of the revitalised power plant. The Łódź Film Commission, a specialized unit supporting film, television, advertising, and photography productions in Łódź and the region, also operates within the EC1 Łódź – City of Culture structure.

The EC1 Łódź – City of Culture complex is an anchor point on the European Route of Industrial Heritage.

== History ==
At the turn of the 20th and 21st centuries, approximately 90 hectares of unused post-industrial and railway lands were located in the centre of Łódź, near the Łódź Fabryczna railway station. Despite its proximity to the centre of the city, the area remained underdeveloped. Its focal points were the station and the historic EC1 Łódź Power Station buildings. In 2005, municipal authorities began work on the New Centre of Łódź project, which proposed wide-scope urban renewal of the EC1 complex and transforming it into a cultural centre. This program relied on combining urban renewal, preserving industrial heritage and developing cultural and educational spaces.

The institution was formally established in 2008; its program gradually developed as subsequent investment stages were carried out. Over time, an umbrella institution model emerged, bringing together specialized units under one management, including the EC1 Science and Technology Centre, the EC1 Planetarium, the National Centre for Film Culture, the Centre for Comics and Interactive Narrative, and the Łódź Film Commission.

== EC1 centres ==
=== EC1 Science and Technology Centre ===
The EC1 Science and Technology Centre in Łódź, opened on January 7, 2018, is the renovated space of the Łódź power plant itself. The engine room, pump room, boiler room, distribution room, softening plant, and cooling tower with a viewing terrace have been renovated and reopened to serve as a museum of the power plant itself.

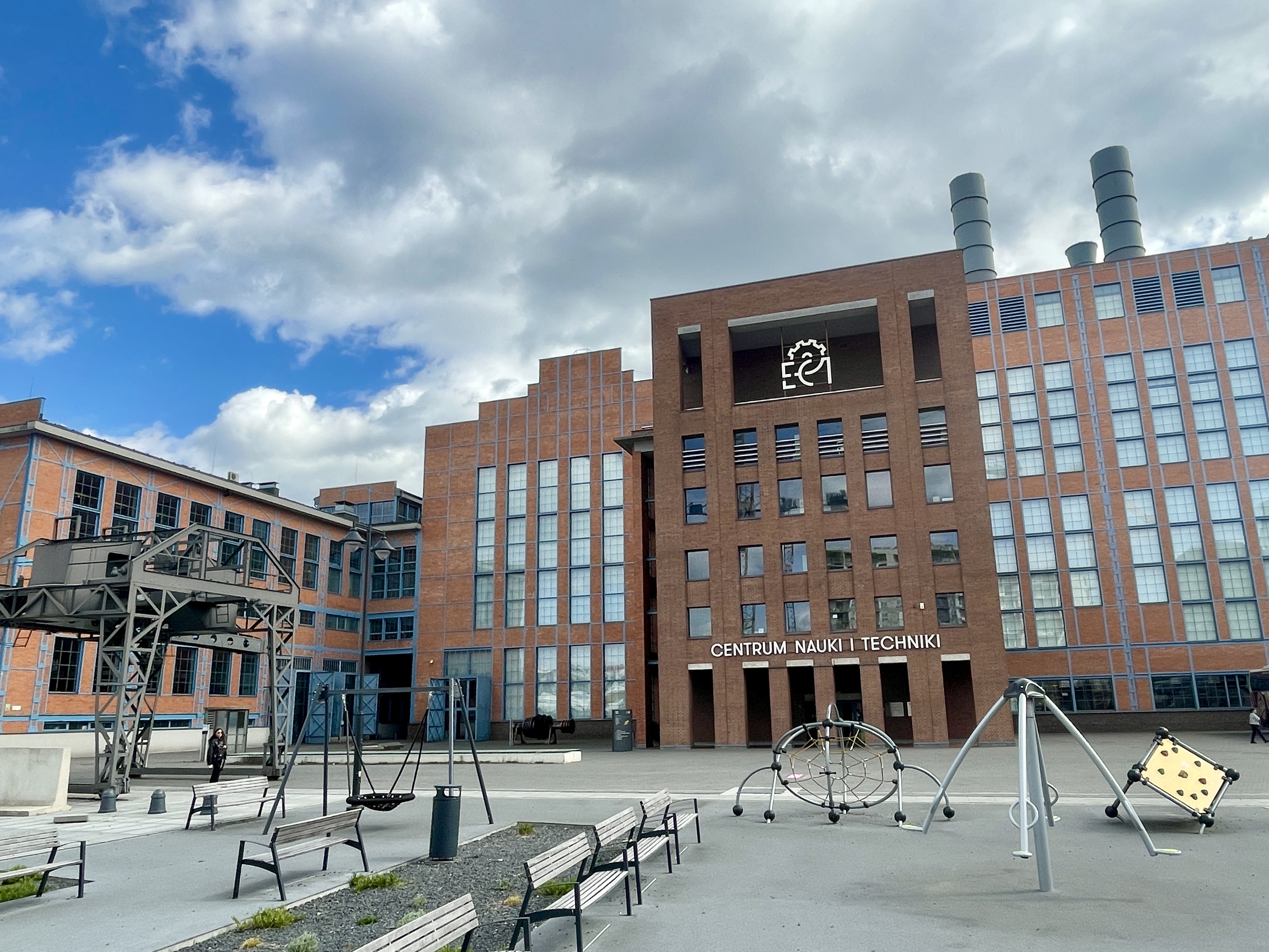
EC1 Science and Technology Centre

Historical exhibits include accounts from former employees, archival materials, the history of the site from its inception to the present, the historical context of Łódź, and the power plant's significance for the Łódź and national energy sectors. The technical portion of the exhibition focuses on the use, journey, and significance of coal, steam, air and the use of individual components of the power plant in the process of generating heat and electricity. The trail includes well-preserved rooms of the EC1 power plant, along with restored original equipment.

Exhibition spaces are equipped with over 150 interactive displays, a spherical cinema, and modern laboratories. The main exhibition is devoted to the history of the Łódź power plant; the "History of Knowledge and Civilization" and "Microworld – Macroworld" exhibits present various aspects of science and technology. Visitors can participate in numerous workshops, meetings, and special events.

==== EC1 cooling tower ====
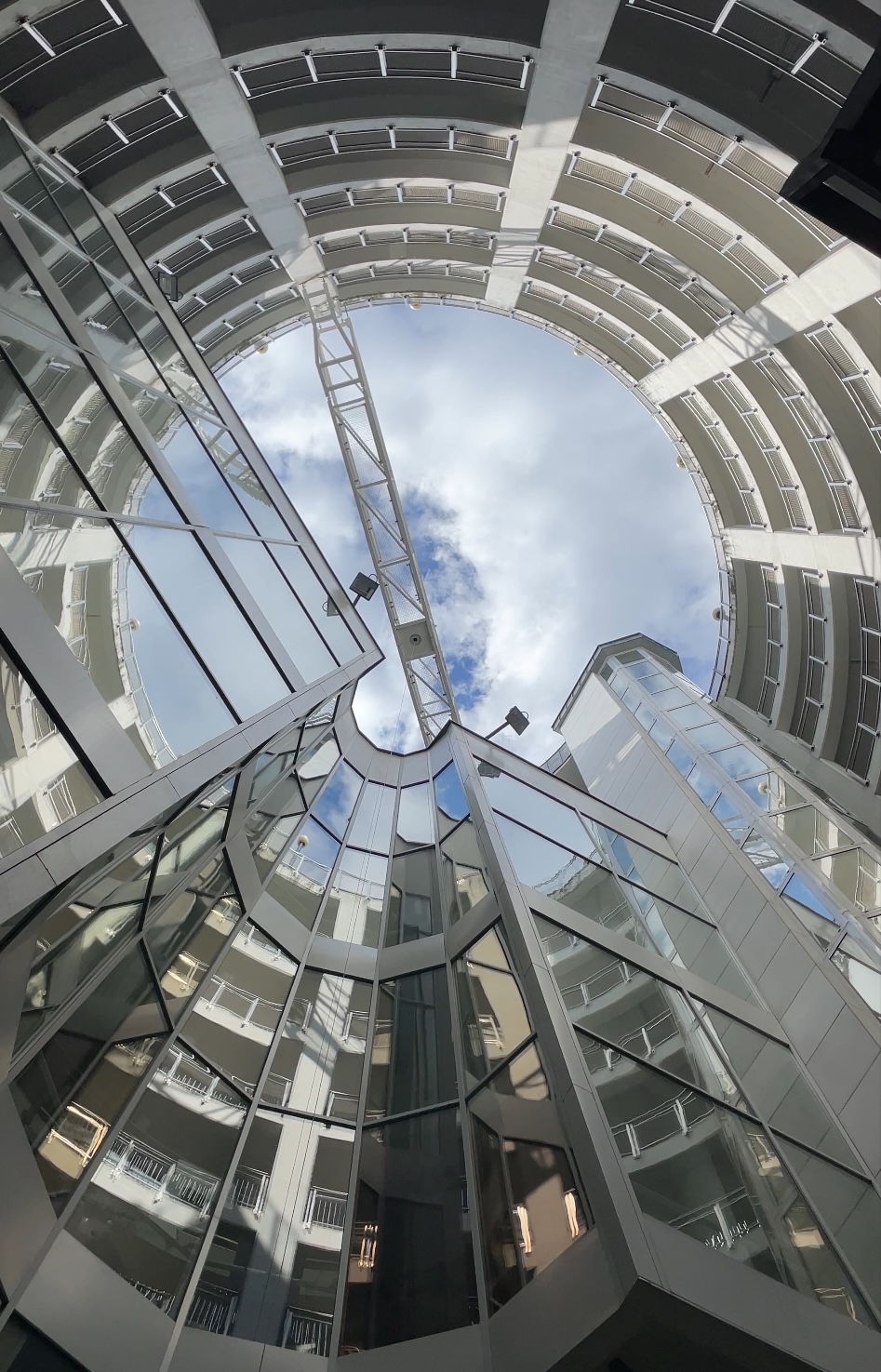
Interior of the EC1 cooling tower, 2025

The cooling tower is one of the best-preserved elements of the former Łódź Power Station's infrastructure and a distinctive architectural feature of the EC1 complex. It was constructed between 1929 and 1930 during the expansion of the power plant, and was used to cool water circulating in the electricity generation process. Standing over 40 metres tall, the structure is visible throughout the complex and is a notable example of interwar industrial architecture. During the revitalization of EC1, the cooling tower was preserved as an industrial heritage monument and underwent conservation and adaptive reuse works. Today, it forms an integral part of the EC1 Science and Technology Centre. It is one of the most recognizable landmarks of the post-industrial landscape of the New Centre of Łódź.

The interior of the cooling tower houses a Foucault pendulum, suspended in the centre of the structure, taking advantage of its full height. A spiral ramp surrounding the pendulum allows visitors to observe both the engineering of the cooling tower and the pendulum's motion from different levels. At the top of the tower is an observation deck, opened to visitors in 2022.

==== EC1 Machine Hall ====
The Machine Hall is one of the best-preserved and most representative interiors of the former Łódź Power Station. Built in 1906–1907, it served as the main hall housing the generators that produced electricity for the rapidly developing city. The building represents early 20th-century industrial architecture, combining features of Art Nouveau with early modernism; it is distinguished by its steel supporting structure, high open interior, and preserved elements of the historic décor, including an ornamental staircase, mezzanines, a clock, and a preserved overhead crane.

After electricity generation ceased, the building became one of the key elements of the EC1 revitalization programme, carried out from 2008 as part of the New Centre of Łódź project. Today, the Machine Hall serves as a multifunctional cultural and representative space. With an area of approximately 1,330 m² and its original power-station equipment preserved, the hall is adapted to host cultural, scientific and conference events. It is one of the most recognizable post-industrial spaces used for cultural purposes in Łódź.

=== National Centre for Film Culture ===
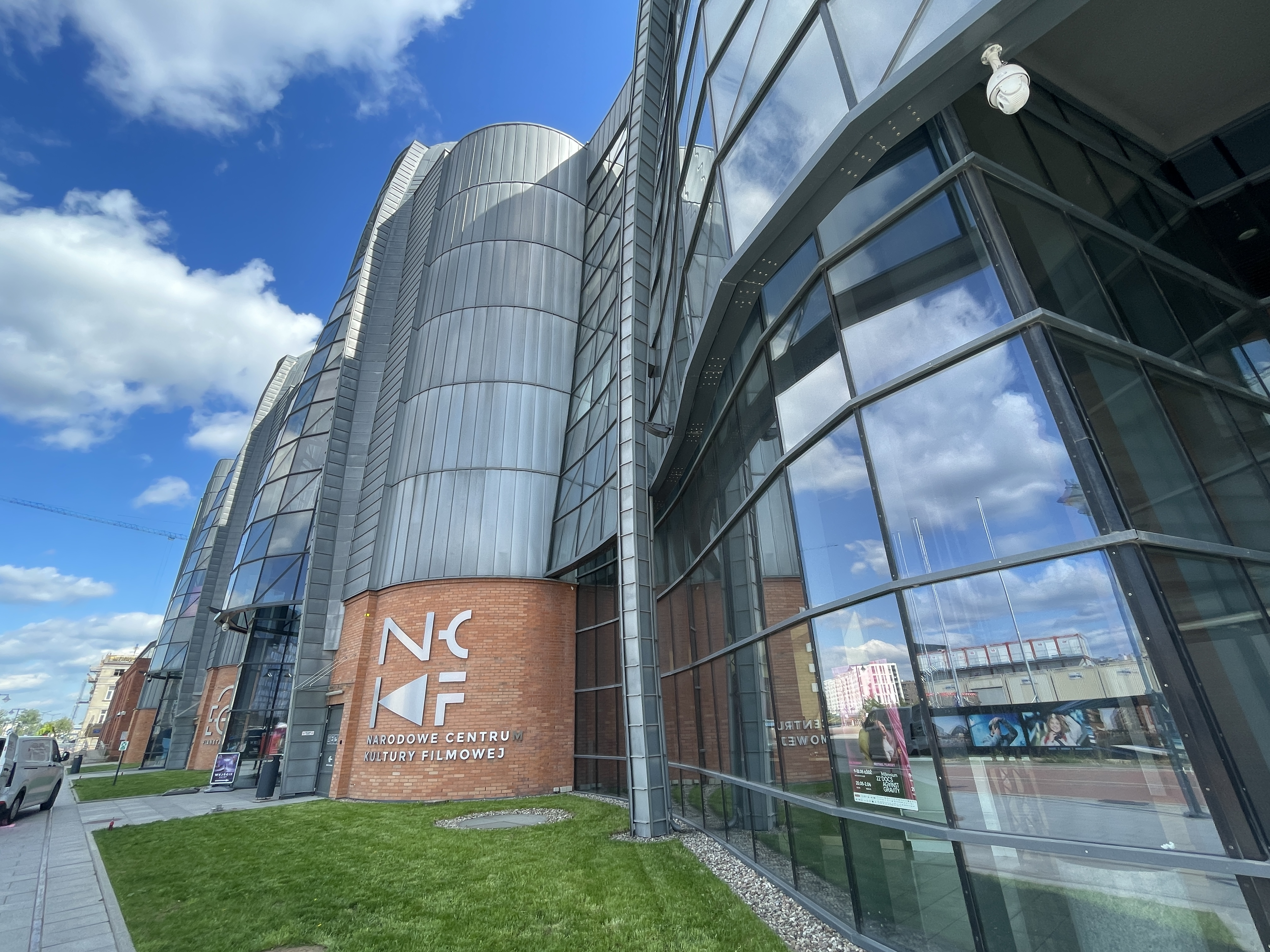
National Centre for Film Culture - entrance

The National Centre for Film Culture is an interdisciplinary museum, archive, and cultural center dedicated to Polish film. The NCKF's mission is to disseminate knowledge about film and educate in the fields of film and audiovisual culture. The permanent display is the largest exhibition devoted to cinematography in Poland; it presents 120 years of Polish film history. The centre presents two permanent exhibitions ("Kino Polonia" and "The matter of cinema"). Apart from exhibition spaces, the centre houses three cinemas, five film education studios, a digitisation centre. The centre spans nine floors and has a total usable area of 18,280 square meters.

=== EC1 Planetarium ===
The EC1 Planetarium, located in the National Centre for Film Culture building, is equipped with a 14-metre spherical screen and a projection system capable of generating images with a resolution of 32 million pixels, allowing for the display of astronomical simulations and educational materials using immersive technology. It hosts popular science screenings, artistic shows, and audiovisual concerts. In 2016, the EC1 Planetarium was recognised as one of the "7 New Wonders of Poland" by National Geographic Traveler.

=== EC1 Centre for Comics and Interactive Narrative ===
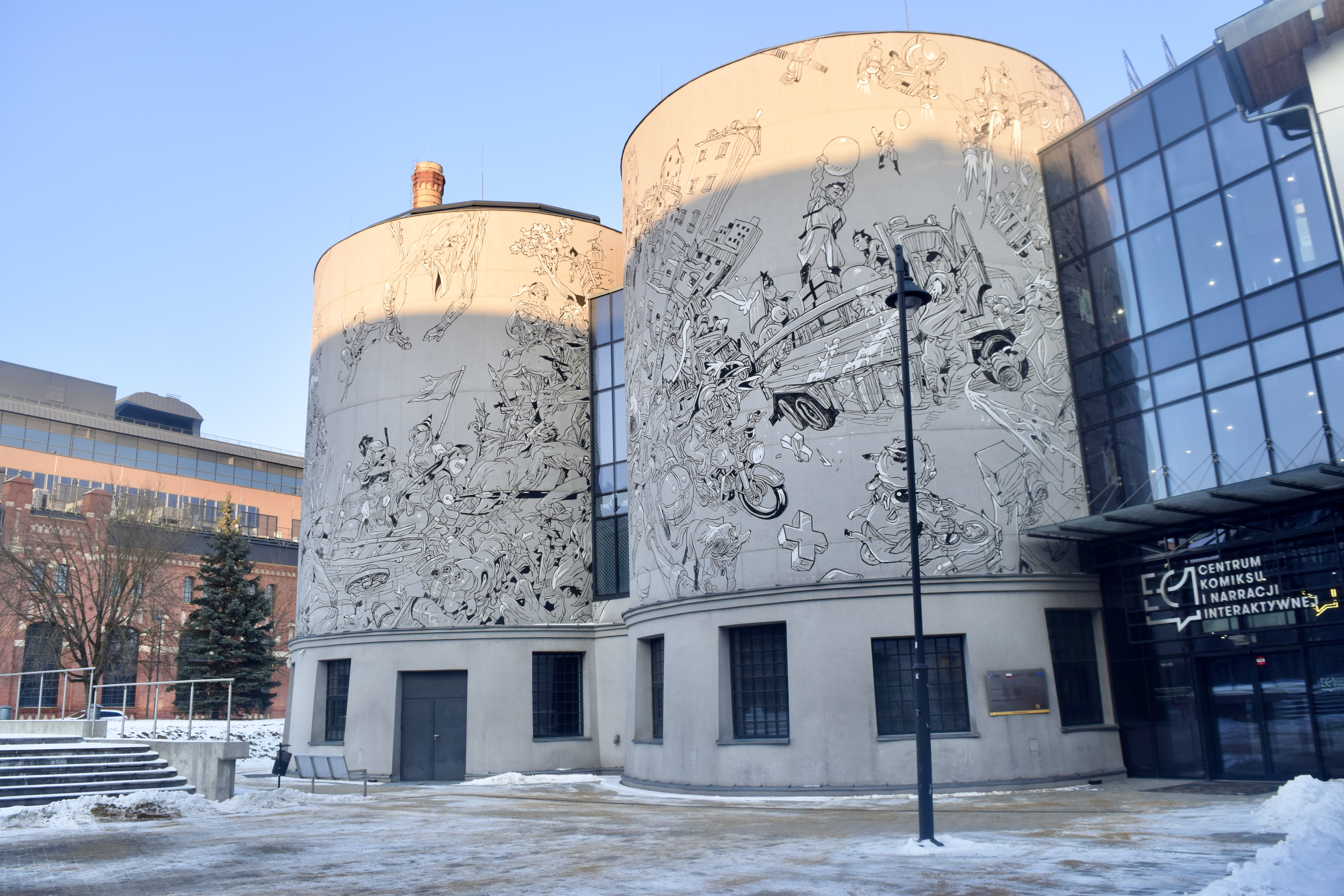
EC1 Centre for Comics and Interactive Narrative

The Centre for Comics and Interactive Narrative is dedicated to the art of comics and video games. It is the first cultural institution in Poland devoted to this thematic area. The Comics Centre building was opened to the public in October 2023. The centre's staff also run the annual International Festival of Comics and Games in Łódź. The centre introduces visitors to the art of comics and interactive storytelling through exhibitions presenting the creative process; it also runs numerous educational and outreach activities.

=== Street of the Elements ===
Street of the Elements (Polish: Ulica Żywiołów) is a children's museum, opened to the public in 2021. It is an interactive educational space designed primarily for children aged 3 to 10. Its goal is to promote science among the youngest audiences and complement the educational offer of the EC1 Science and Technology Centre. The exhibition occupies approximately 1,500 square meters, is spread over three floors and divided into five 'element' zones (water, earth, air, fire, and life). The space's architecture utilizes multi-sensory exhibits, interactive stations, climbing structures, and movement features.
