= New Centre of Łódź =

Urban area in Łódź, Poland

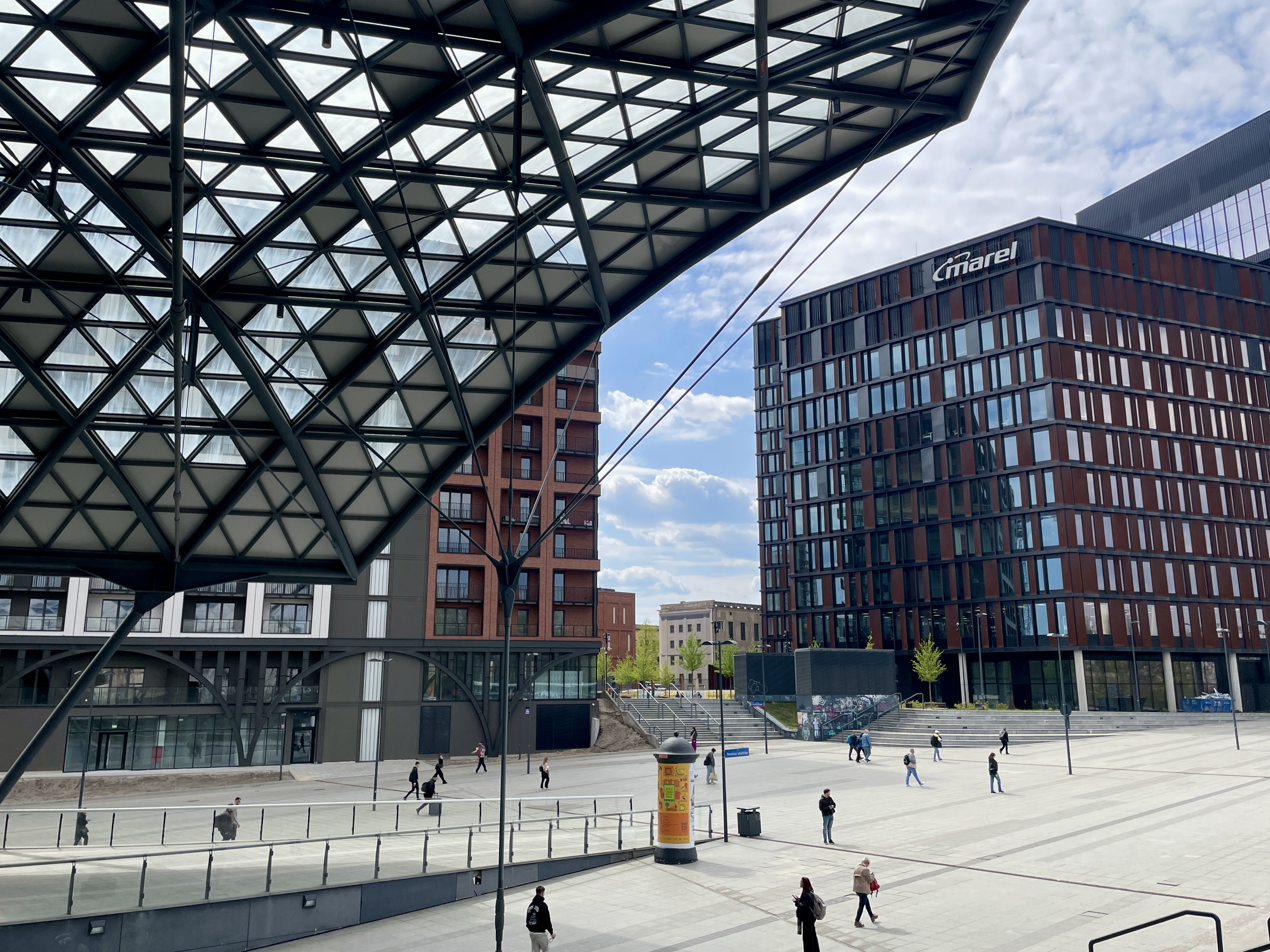
New Centre of Łódź, exit from Łódź Fabryczna Station, Sałaciński Square

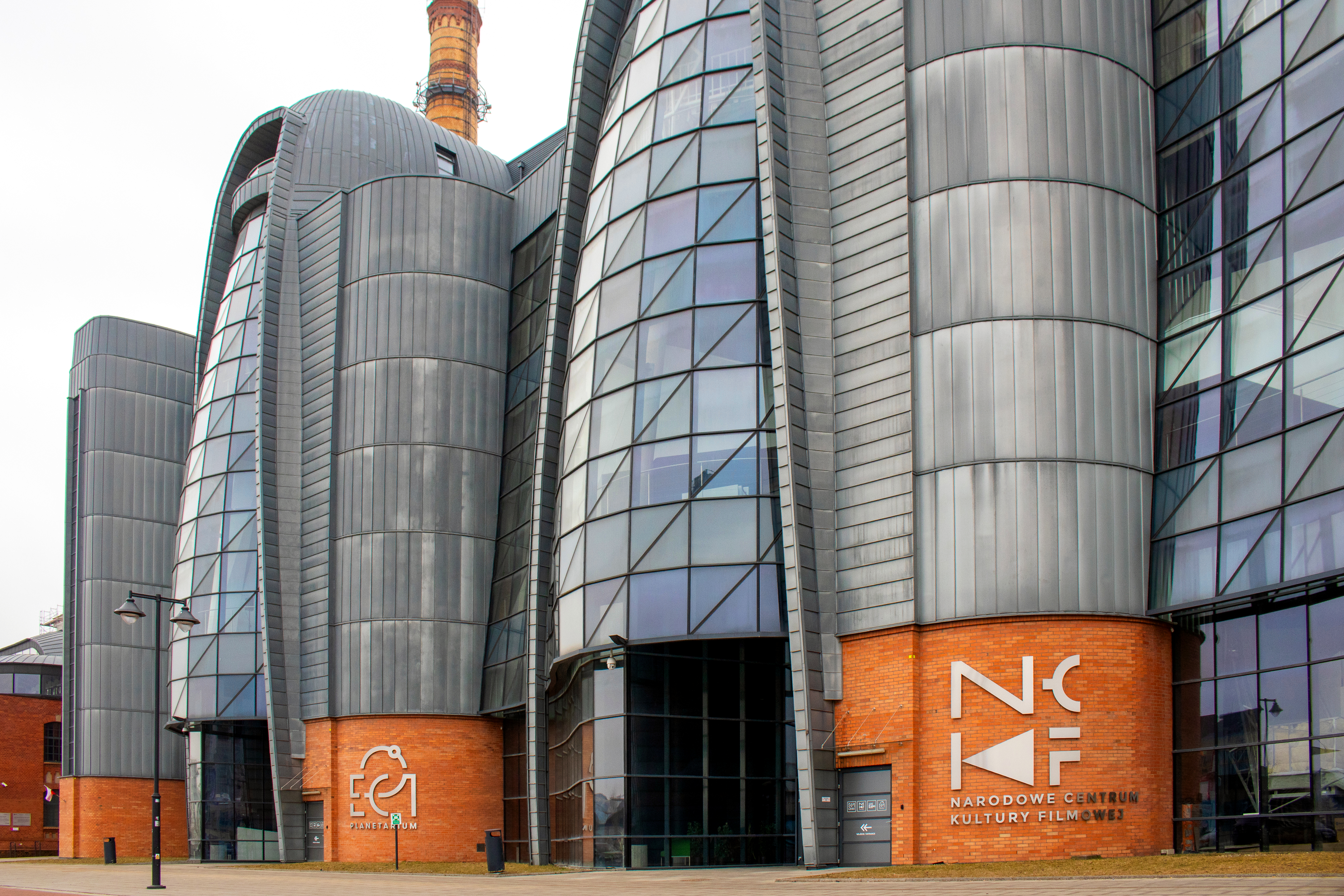
EC1 National Centre for Film Culture

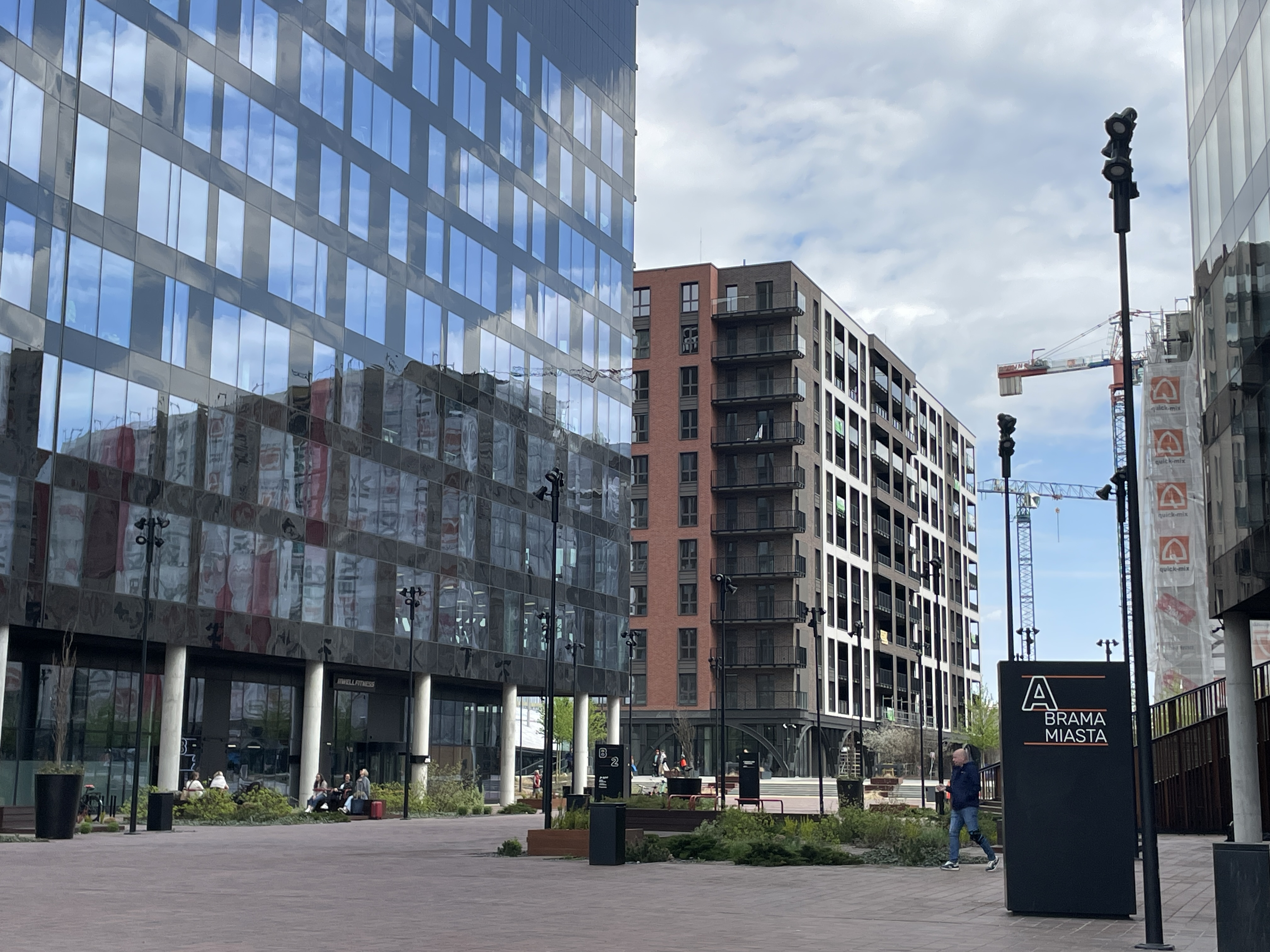
City Gate blocks, 2026

The New Centre of Łódź (Polish: Nowe Centrum Łodzi, NCŁ) is a redeveloped urban area in the centre of Łódź, home to the Łódź Fabryczna railway station and the EC1 Łódź – City of Culture cultural complex located in renovated buildings previously housing the first power plant in the city, located on Targowa Street.

== Project History ==
At the turn of the 20th and 21st centuries, approximately 90 hectares of unused post-industrial and railway lands were located in Łódź, near the Łódź Fabryczna station. Despite its proximity to the city centre, the area remained neglected and underdeveloped. Its focal points were the railway station and the historic EC1 Łódź power plant buildings. In 2005, municipal authorities began work on the New Centre of Łódź project, which proposed wide-scope urban renewal of the EC1 complex and transforming it into a cultural centre, as well as thoroughly reconstructing the Łódź Fabryczna station, modernising it and converting from a terminus into a through station.

The goal of the project was to create a new, multi-functional urban space combining cultural, social, and recreational functions. The project envisioned creating an attractive part of the city, in which cultural institutions would be developed. The investment also included the modernization of transport infrastructure and the construction of a new, underground Łódź Fabryczna station.

The renewal process of the New Center of Łódź (NCŁ) area began in 2007. The NCŁ program was established by a resolution of the Łódź City Council of August 28, 2007. The first spatial development concept for the New Center of Łódź was authored by urban planner Rob Krier, who in 2007 outlined the foundations of the plan, including the location of the new Łódź Fabryczna station, functional zones, and street grid. The space, freed up by the underground construction of the railway line and Łódź Fabryczna station, was developed by creating a new section of the city, previously divided by the railway tracks and the station. Between 2007 and 2015, this was the largest investment of its kind implemented in Central Europe. The space freed up by moving the railway line and Łódź Fabryczna station underground was developed by creating a new section of the city, previously divided by the railway tracks. Between 2007 and 2015, this was the largest investment of its kind in Central Europe.

== Łódź Fabryczna Station redevelopment ==
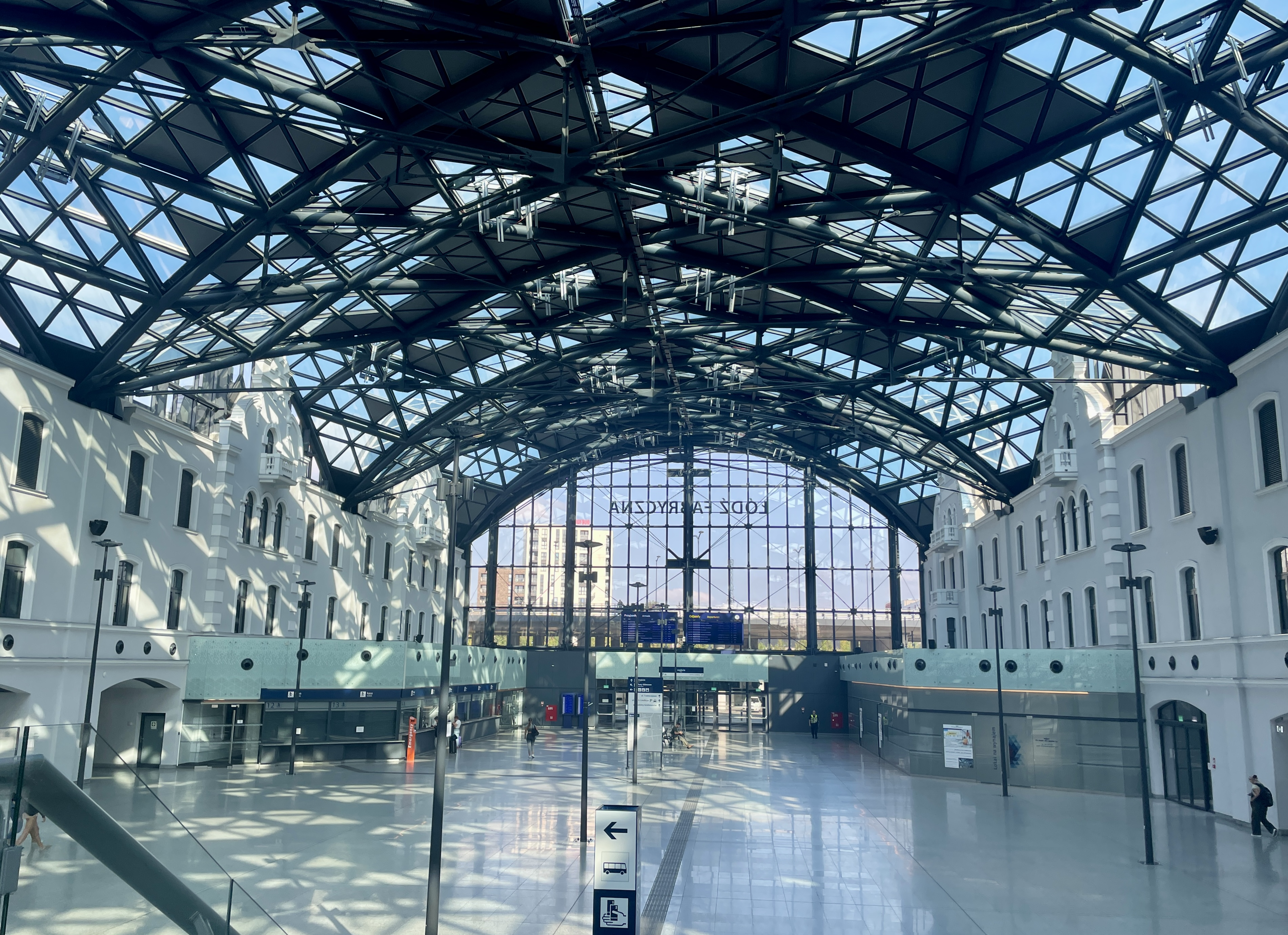
Łódź Fabryczna railway station - main hall, 2025 (02)

The New Łódź Fabryczna railway station was built between 2011 and 2016. The former 19th-century terminus and several kilometres of surface railway tracks were demolished. In their place, a fully underground multimodal transport hub was created, connecting rail services with public transport, road traffic, cycling, and pedestrian routes. The project also freed large areas of land above the station for new urban development.

The railway platforms and tracks were moved several levels below ground. Above them, a concourse with a glazed roof brings natural daylight into the station. The interior design references the historic station through façades modelled on the demolished 19th-century building. Today, Łódź Fabryczna is the largest railway station in Poland and one of the largest underground stations in Europe. It also serves as the main transport hub of the New Centre of Łódź and the future eastern terminus of the city's cross-city railway tunnel.

== EC1 Łódź – City of Culture ==
The former EC1 Łódź power plant complex is located near Łódź Fabryczna station. The power plant's operations ended in 2000. Since 2010, the historic industrial complex has been gradually restored and adapted for cultural and educational purposes. Today it is known as EC1 Łódź – City of Culture, one of the main institutions of the New Centre of Łódź. The revitalization preserved much of the site's industrial architecture while converting the buildings into museums, exhibition spaces, cinemas, and educational facilities.

=== EC1 Science and Technology Centre ===
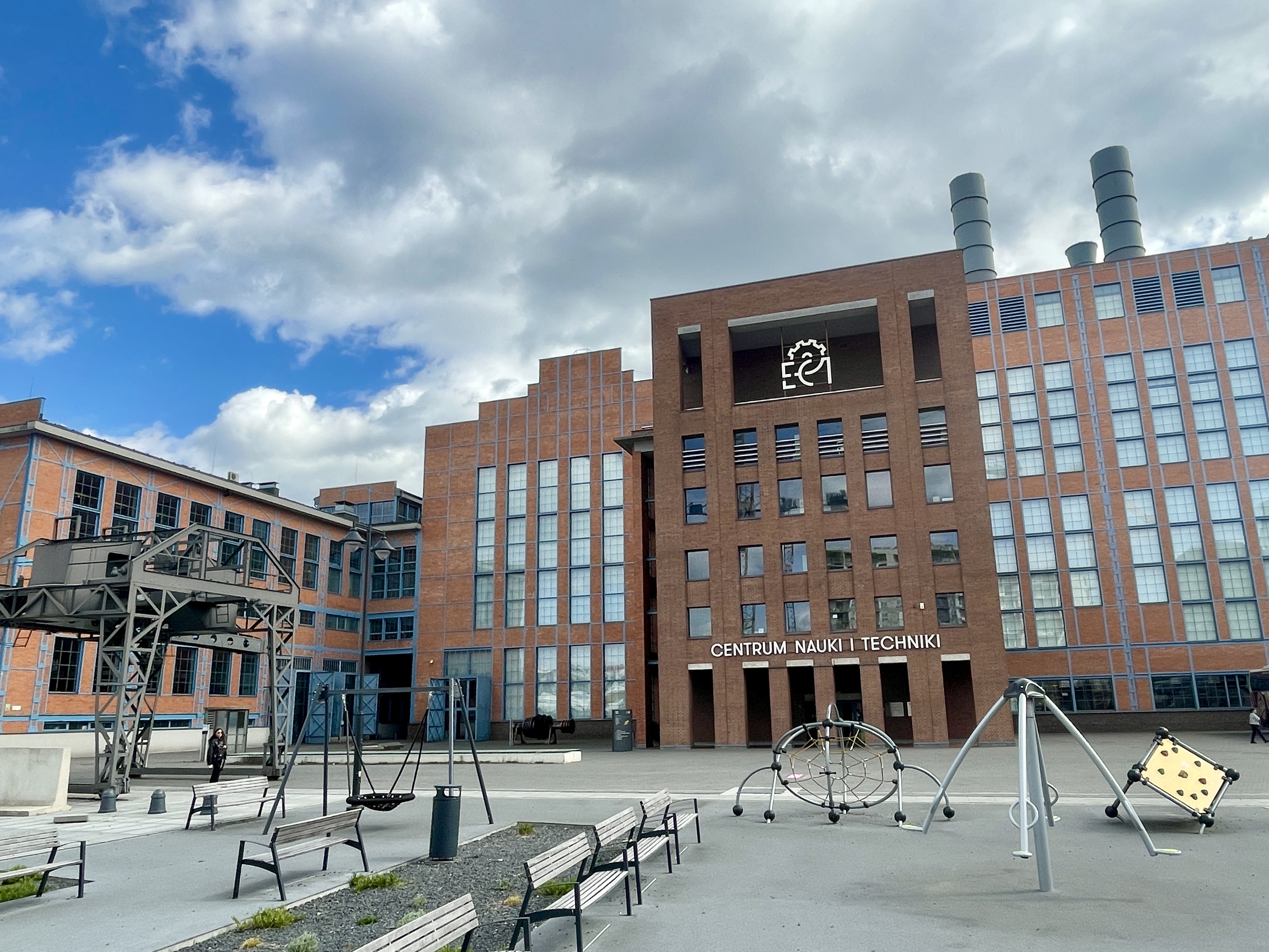
EC1 Science and Technology Centre, 2025

The western part of the complex houses the EC1 Science and Technology Centre. Its main permanent exhibition focuses on the history of the former power station and the production of electricity. Additional interactive exhibitions explore subjects such as physics, astronomy, biology, and technology. Visitors follow themed exhibition routes and can take part in experiments and educational workshops.

=== National Centre for Film Culture ===
The eastern section of EC1 is home to the National Centre for Film Culture (NCKF). The institution combines a film museum, archive, cinemas, and conference facilities. Its permanent exhibition presents the history of Polish cinema from its beginnings to the present day. The centre also hosts exhibitions, educational programmes, workshops, screenings, and cultural events related to film and audiovisual media.

=== EC1 Centre for Comics and Interactive Narrative ===
The EC1 Centre for Comics and Interactive Narrative occupies the former technical facilities of the power station. The building originally contained the plant's cooling systems and other industrial equipment. During its restoration, many historic features were preserved, including the characteristic cooling towers, which now contain exhibition spaces. Today the centre is dedicated to comics, video games, and other forms of interactive storytelling.

=== Machine Hall ===
The Machine Hall is one of the best-preserved interiors of the former power station. Built in 1906–1907, it originally housed the turbines that generated electricity for the city. The hall retains many original architectural and industrial features, including its steel structure, decorative staircase, mezzanines, clock, and overhead crane. Following the revitalisation of EC1, it was converted into a venue for exhibitions, conferences, concerts, and other cultural events.
