= Rafał Betlejewski =

Polish performer, paratheatre artist, and copywriter and writer

- Born: Rafał Piotr Betlejewski; 30 October 1969 (age 56); Gdańsk, Gdańsk Voivodeship, Polish People's Republic
- Known for: I miss you, Jew!
- Website: rafalbetlejewski.pl

Rafał Betlejewski (born 30 October 1969 in Gdańsk) is a Polish performer, paratheatre artist, writer and copywriter.

He is the founder of the Transparent Theater and the creator of social campaigns, including Burn Shame and I miss you, Jew. He is interested in the phenomena of identity, social roles, as well as language and social communication.

== Professional activities ==
Betlejewski is the founder of the advertising agencies Cytryna Advertising Agency and Colleagues Strategy & Creation. Some of his work there included advertising campaigns for Mlekpol, a dairy cooperative and the largest milk company in Poland, as well as for mobile phone network Era. He is also the president of the board of the Advertising People Association.

Until 2017, he ran the programs DeFacto and Betlejewski.Provocations on TTV. In the past, he also hosted broadcasts on Polish Radio RDC, including among others, Betlejewski on Saturdays and Science Frikszyn – about science with people on Tuesdays. He left the station in 2015 in protest of the dismissal of editor-in-chief Ewa Wanat.

In 2015, together with Ewa Wanat and Tomasz Stawiszyński, he founded Public Medium radio as part of a project of the same name, along with a team of professional and civic journalists, experts, and social activists.

== Social actions ==
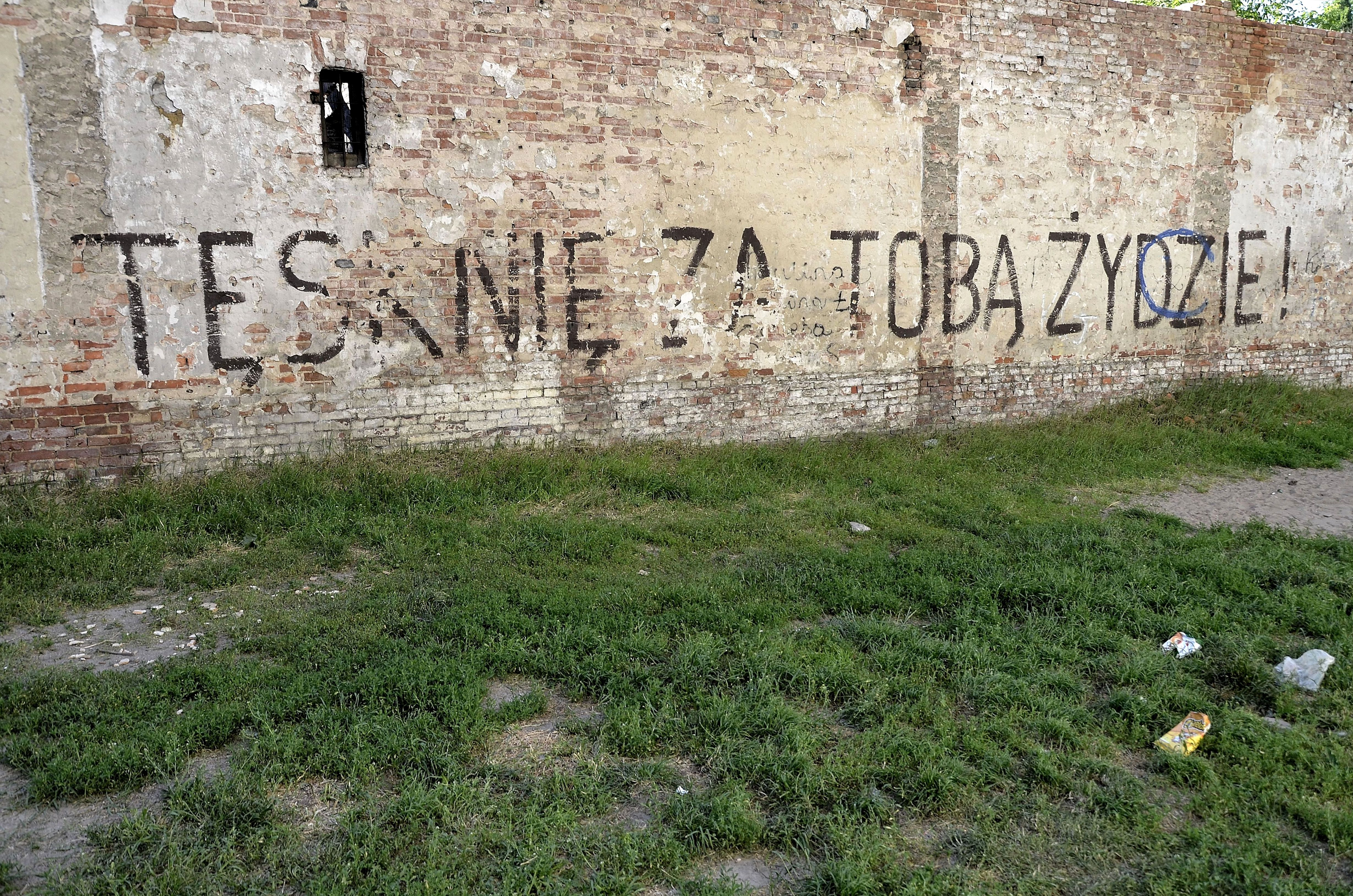
The inscription 'I miss you, Jew!' on Brzeska Street in Warsaw
- Beautiful Agony – Anna Politkovskaya: On 20 February 2014, Betlejewski posted a video less than two minutes in length on his YouTube channel in which he masturbates and orgasms in the staircase where Anna Politkovskaya, a Russian journalist and human rights activist, was murdered. The video description indicates that it is one of the 14 videos that he made during his artistic residency in Moscow at the invitation of the National Center for Contemporary Art and the Polish Institute.
- (2016): A controversial television experiment created as part of the program Betlejewski. Provocations, recorded in Radom and broadcast on TTV. The program features desperate residents of Radom looking for work. They were recorded with hidden cameras in staged scenes during fictitious job interviews. During the interviews, hired actors offered unaware program participants a well-paid job if they agreed to act unlawfully or provide services that went far beyond expected responsibilities for a job. The experiment was met with criticism from some journalists, who considered Rafał Beltejewski's actions to be unethical.
- "Hunger" (2012)
- "Burn shame." In this campaign, organized from 2001 to 2004, Betlejewski addressed his message to employees who were not satisfied with work in large corporations: "You got corrupted, come to burn shame." Happenings also took place during this campaign, consisting of the burning of artifacts of corporate life, such as company pens, floppy disks, employee opinions, etc.
- I miss you, Jew!: Although the idea was created in 2004, the slogan itself was not created until a year later. There are several projects contained within the main project. One such project consisted of photographing Poles in public spaces once associated with Polish Jews, alongside an empty chair and a kippah placed on it. Another project consisted of writing the slogan "I miss you, Jew" on walls. This was done not just by himself, and Betlejewski encouraged others to write the slogan on their own as well. Subsequently, these slogans, both legal and illegal, began to appear throughout Poland, with photos of them being posted on a common website online. On the same website, Betlejewski created a space for preserving the memories of Jews in Poland as well as for expressing memories related to those memories. He defined the purposes of his activities as "[wanting] to retrieve the word Jew, take it away from the anti-Semites who are the only ones in this country who use the word freely. I am striving to build a platform for expressing positive emotions towards the people referred to as Jews."

The next installment of this campaign was a happening on 11 July 2010 – the day after the 69th anniversary of the Jedwabne pogrom – under the name "Płonie stodola", or "The barn is burning". Betlejewski set fire to a specially constructed barn in the village of Zawada, but only after he placed symbolic white cards from people who were "burdened with unkind thoughts toward Jews". The artist, who is Catholic and not Jewish, sought to symbolically switch places with the victims of the Holocaust, break historical divisions, and try to find himself in the position that Jews were in during the pogrom. Betlejewski described this event as both a confession and a propitiation.

- "TV chapel" (2009): In an act of protest against a provision in a media law adopted by parliament stating that public media is to promote Christian values, Rafał Betlejewski erected a chapel in the Ochota district of Warsaw, decorated it with ribbons and flowers, and placed a television set in its center rather than a holy picture. The chapel operated for two weeks, generating not only interest from nearby residents and people passing by, but acts of aggression as well.

== Photography ==
- "Let's get to know each other. Zielona Góra – here and now. " In 2002, on 40 billboards in Zielona Góra, Betlejewski used the slogan "Let's get to know each other. Zielona Góra: here and now" to present photographs of notable city residents in fun and casual situations. Subjects included the local police commander, Mrs. Kasia from the solarium, employees of the vodka factory, the surgeon from the provincial hospital as well as the city's president.
- "I prefer Poland." A series of photos published in 2004 on postcards addressing problems in Polish perceptions towards residents of other countries. Betlejewski photographed tourists and residents of these cities in Rio de Janeiro and Cape Town, holding boards with inscriptions praising Poland, such as "Sopot is legendary for us", "I would live in Radom", "The Baltic is a real grazing", and "Long live bigos".
- "And would I go?" Also in 2004, the artist created a series of posters depicting veterans and participants of the Warsaw Uprising. They were depicted in unusual poses, and shown in funny situations and contexts.

Staszek said that "boys from" Umbrella" were elite, so in the photo he is taking aim with an umbrella, as if he were a boy playing war. Romek burned his ear and lost his hearing. In the picture he laughs widely, nibbling on his ear.

— Rafał Betlejewski

Betlejewski's goal was to show the subjects in a more modern light, show the heroes of the Warsaw Uprising as interesting people in their own right, and attempt to answer the question of what patriotism is today. It was not his last encounter with the subject of the uprising. Betlejewski is also the author of the script for the comic book anthology 44 (2007) about the fate of Polish insurgents in the Warsaw Uprising.

== Paratheatrical activities ==
- "Milk" ("Milk – Take Away Theater"): Under the auspices of the TR Warszawa theatre in Warsaw, Betlejewski directed and implemented the "Milk – Take Away Theater" project in 2005 and 2006 with Agnieszka Podsiadlik, Eryk Lubos, Jan Drawnel, Tomasz Tyndryk, and Rafał Maćkowiak. The act consisted of a home-ordered performance for 500 zł of a half-hour presentation on the market situation for milk, the actors asking questions for a milk advertising campaign, and ultimately the actors leaving the home without saying a word. The performance was performed in a variable composition of three people. Betlejewski explained that he wanted to arouse catharsis in the viewer, and also wanted to ""unmask the rules governing consumerism, expose the traps lurking behind attractive packaging, and ask about the role of theater".
- "I Like You and You Like Me.": This project was implemented at the Orchard Gallery in New York City. Together with his curator, Barbara Piwowarska, Betlejewski shut himself for three days in the gallery's exhibition hall in 2006. The social and professional roles of both individuals (the artist and his curator) were mixed with intimate roles (man and woman). The idea for this project was inspired by Mircei Cantor's Departure (2004) and Joseph Beuys' I Like America and America Likes Me (1974), in which Beyus spent three days with a coyote alone in a gallery room.
- Transparent Theater: In 2006 and 2007, under the auspices of the Transparent Theater, of which he founded, Betlejewski took part in a number of para-theatrical projects that involved playing typical social roles, such as a writer, manager, father in the park, teacher on the train, artist on the bridge, and cousin at lunch. He prepared for each performance by creating a stereotypical representation of a given group and providing himself with props characteristic of the persona. All performances took place in public spaces or public places; for example, the role of Teacher on the train was played on InterCity trains. Betlejewski initiated conversation with passengers on the train using the language of teachers gained from posts on internet forums. He only revealed himself, by handing out leaflets to fellow passengers stating that they took part in a performance, right before the destination station. In these performances, Betlejewski played numerous identities (including social roles that he actually plays in his life like a father) so that he could "be able to regain control over [these roles] and put them into practice in his own terms".
- One Day Theater: In 2009, Betlejewski made an appeal for people to play their own parts on World Theatre Day the next year, on 27 March. This was done in cooperation with the Theater Institute Zbigniew Raszewski, with the action named 'One Day Theater'. Betlejewski described this action as conceptual in nature, taking place primarily in the mental space of its participants. He described the action's purpose as to make people aware that everyone acts in multiple roles every single day, whether they actively realize it or not.

== Books ==
- Lekcje Religii na Boże Narodzenie. 2021.
- Jak się uwolnić od Kościoła. Poradnik w sześciu krokach. 2022. Ebook.
- 365 lekcji religii dla całej rodziny, która chce się wyzwolić. Warszawa: Self-published. 2022. ISBN 978-83-951096-1-4.
- Pasożyt. 2023.
- Imperium Bujdy – O kłamczuszku w czarnej sutannie i mądrych dzieciach. 2024.
