= Rafał Syska =

Polish film historian

- Rafał Syska in 2023
- Born: January 21, 1974 (age 52); Kielce
- Education: Jagiellonian University
- Occupation: Film professor, film critic
- Title: Director of National Centre for Film Culture (2015–2025)

Rafał Syska is a Polish film historian and associate professor in the Audiovisual Arts Department of the Jagiellonian University in Kraków. Between 2015 and 2025, he was the director of the National Centre for Film Culture in Łódź and one of the main creators of this institution's exhibitions and program.

== Career and film research ==
He initially specialised in the phenomenon of violence in cinema (PhD thesis Film and Violence. Ways of Film Violence Representation), then he focused on strategies of authorship in American cinema (post Ph-D., habilitation dissertation Keep the Distance. Film World of Robert Altman) and contemporary minimalistic slow-cinema, especially its neomodernism tendencies (e.g. works of Theo Angelopoulos, Alexander Sokurov, Béla Tarr, Bruno Dumont, Sarunas Bartas, Fred Kelemen, Tsai Ming-liang, Lisandro Alonso, Carlos Reygadas. Now he specializes in cinematic and narrative museology and exhibition studies.

He was also an editor of the dictionary Film Dictionary and now he is a co-editor of a numerous-volume books: Masters of American Cinema and History of Cinema.

Syska was also a grant holder of the Kosciuszko Foundation, Stanislaw Estreicher Foundation, Polityka Weekly Magazine and the Foundation for Polish Science. He was a visiting scholar at Columbia University in New York in 2012.

In 1994-2004, he was the co-creator of Etiuda&Anima International Film Festival in Kraków and twice he was its deputy director. He is a founder and editor-in-chief (2011-2018) of "EKRANy" bi-monthly film magazine.

Syska was a curator of the exhibition Stanley Kubrick (2014) and Andrzej Wajda (2019) - both in the National Museum in Kraków and No End. Krzysztof Kieślowski Dialogs (2021) at the National Centre for Film Culture. He is also a member of Kyoto-Krakow Foundation Board. In 2016 he was a chairman of the board of National Film Archive in Warsaw.

Syska was the director of the National Centre for Film Culture in Łódź from 2016 to 2025.

== Publications (selection) ==
Books:

- 100 thrillers, Rabid, Kraków, 2002.
- Film and Violence. Ways of Film Violence Representation, Rabid, Kraków, 2003.
- Film Dictionary (editor), Zielona Sowa, Kraków 2005.
- Masters of American Cinema, vol. 1 Classics, co-editor Łukasz A. Plesnar, Rabid, Kraków 2006.
- Masters of American Cinema, vol. 2 Rebel and Nostalgia, co-editor Łukasz A. Plesnar, Rabid, Kraków 2007.
- Poetry of Pictures. Theo Angelopoulos Films, Rabid, Kraków 2008.
- Keep the Distance. Film World of Robert Altman, Rabid, Kraków 2008.
- History of Cinema, vol. 1. Silent Cinema, co-editor Tadeusz Lubelski, Iwona Sowińska, Universitas, Kraków 2009.
- Masters of American Cinema, vol. 3 Present Time, co-editor Łukasz A. Plesnar, Rabid, Kraków 2010.
- History of Cinema, vol. 2. Classical Cinema, co-editor Tadeusz Lubelski, Iwona Sowińska, Universitas, Kraków 2011.
- Adaptation of American Literature, editor, EKRANy, Kraków 2013.
- Neomodernism in Cinema, Avalon, Kraków 2014.
- History of Cinema, vol. 3. New Vawe Cinema, co-editor Tadeusz Lubelski, Iwona Sowińska, Universitas, Kraków 2015.
- History of Cinema, vol. 4. Cinema of the End of the Century, co-editor Tadeusz Lubelski, Iwona Sowińska, Universitas, Kraków 2018.
- Andrzej Wajda, editor, National Museum, Kraków 2019.
- Kawalerowicz Frames, editor, National Centre for Film Culture, Łódź 2022.

Essays (selection):

- Terror Cinema [in] Film Genre. Yesterday and Today, Krzysztof Loska (ed.), Rabid Kraków 1998.
- Aggression and Evil. Ways of 20th Century Destructivness [in] Iconical Violence or New Sight, Eugeniusz Wilk (ed.), WUŚ Katowice 2001.
- Thriller as a Genre [in] Around Film Genre, Krzysztof Loska (ed.), Kraków 2002.
- Revolution that has not come. Upon political context of Rainer Werner Fassbinder works [in] Masters of European Cinema, Grażyna Stachówna, Joanna Wojnicka (ed.), Kraków 2002.
- Janusz Morgenstern. In the Trap of Present Time [w:] Authors of Polish Cinema, Grażyna Stachówna, Joanna Wojnicka (ed.), Kraków 2004.
- Béla Tarr. Wheel is Over [in] Authors of European Cinema, vol. 3, Alicja Helman, Andrzej Pitrus (ed.), Rabid, Kraków 2007.
- Michael Haneke – In Feeling of Guilt [in] New Audiovisual – New Paradigm of Culture?, Eugeniusz Wilk, Iwona Kolasińska-Pasterczyk (ed.), Wydawnictwo Uniwersytetu Jagiellońskiego, Kraków 2008.
- Bruno Dumont – Looking [in] Authors of European Cinema, Alicja Helman, Andrzej Pitrus (ed.), Rabid, Kraków 2009.
- Marlowe from the Beyond. „The Long Goodbye” by Robert Altman [in] „Studia filmoznawcze” nr 29, Sławomir Bobowski (ed.), Wydawnictwo Uniwersytetu Wrocławskiego, Wrocław 2009.
- The Beginning of American Cineman [in] History of Cinema, vol. 1, Silent Cinema, Tadeusz Lubelski, Iwona Sowińska, Rafał Syska (ed.), Universitas, Kraków 2009.
- David Lynch. Sad Cinema About Death [in] Masters of American Cinema, vol. 3., Present Time, Łukasz Plesnar, Rafał Syska (ed.), Rabid, Kraków 2009.
- Experience of the internal cinema. Narration in Inland Empire by David Lynch [in:] "Kwartalnik filmowy" 71-72/2010.
- Don Kichote by Orson Welles: Unfinished Journey onto the Moon [in:] From Cervantes to Perez-Reverte. Adaptation of Spanish Literature, ed. Alicja Helman i Kamila Żyto, Warszawa: Kino Rabid 2010.
- Theory of Meaning by David Bordwell, "EKRANy" 1-2,3/2012.
- Neomodernism. Slow-Motion Cinema, "EKRANy" 1-2/2012.
- Internal Women World. Early Works by Chantal Akerman, "Kwartalnik filmowy" 79/2012.
- Nostalgia for Tarkovsky. Films of Carlos Reygadas and Alexandr Sokurov [in:] Film Zone. Cinema of Andrey Tarkovsky, ed. Iwona Anna NDiaye, Marek Sokołowski, Wydawnictwo Adam Marszałek, Toruń 2013.
- Split screen – History of Shattered World, "EKRANy" 2013, 5 (15).
- Time-lasting. Gilles Deleuze in Contemporary Cinema, "EKRANy" 2014, 2 (18).
- Art-hard core, "EKRANy" 2014, 3-4 (19-20).
- We Are All Kubricks, "Dekada Krakowska" 3/4 (13/14) 2014.
- No-film, nie-cinema [w:] „EKRANy” 5/2016, s. 4-10.
- Smart cinema. Wise cinema from indie-world [in:] „Kwartalnik filmowy” 93-94/2016, s. 130-139.
- Unvisible heroes of back stage. RKO and Orson Welles [in:] Orson Welles. Works – Reception – Heritage, Paweł Biliński (ed.), Wydawnictwo Uniwersytetu Gdańskiego, Gdańsk 2016, s. 59-72.
- Comic books in museums and galleries. Paradoxes of presence and absence of comic books in museum practices, in: „Kultura popularna”, 2019 nr 4 (62), s. 28-41.
- Intensity of the Moment [in:] Rafał Syska (ed.), Fotosy:– Renata Pajchel, Narodowe Centrum Kultury Filmowej, Łódź 2018.
- “Reaganmatography”. American Cinema in 1980s. [in:] History of Cinema, vol. 4: Cinema of the End of Century, co-editor Tadeusz Lubelski, Iwona Sowińska, Universitas, Kraków 2018, p. 81-160.
- Greece [in:] History of Cinema, vol. 4: Cinema of the End of Century, co-editor Tadeusz Lubelski, Iwona Sowińska, Universitas, Kraków 2018, p. 1189-1204.
- Comic books in museums and galleries. Paradoxes of presence and absence of comic books in curatorial practices, in: „Kultura popularna”, 2019 nr 4 (62), p. 28-41.
- SnorriCam. A New Look at the Face [w:] Post-technological Experiences. Art-Science-Culture, Michał Krawczak (red.), Adam Mickiewicz University Poznan 2019, p. 180-187.
- To Touch a Movie: Technical Conditions of the Phenome-non of Film in a Museum [in:] „Kwartalnik Filmowy” 113 (2021), p. 68-90.
- Film in a Space. Polish Cinema in Galleries and Museums [w:] Polish Cinema Now. From Mainstream to Experiment, Marta Giec, Artur Majer (ed.), PWSFTviT w Łodzi, Łódź 2021, p. 261-282.
- At a Desk of Pulawska street. Kawalerowicz as a Leader of Film Unit „Kadr” [in.] Kawalerowicz Frames, Rafał Syska, Anna Wróblewska (ed.), Narodowe Centrum Kultury Filmowej, Stowarzyszenie Filmowców Polskich, Łódź-Warszawa 2022, p. 93-112.
