= Rafał Woś =

Polish journalist (born 1982)

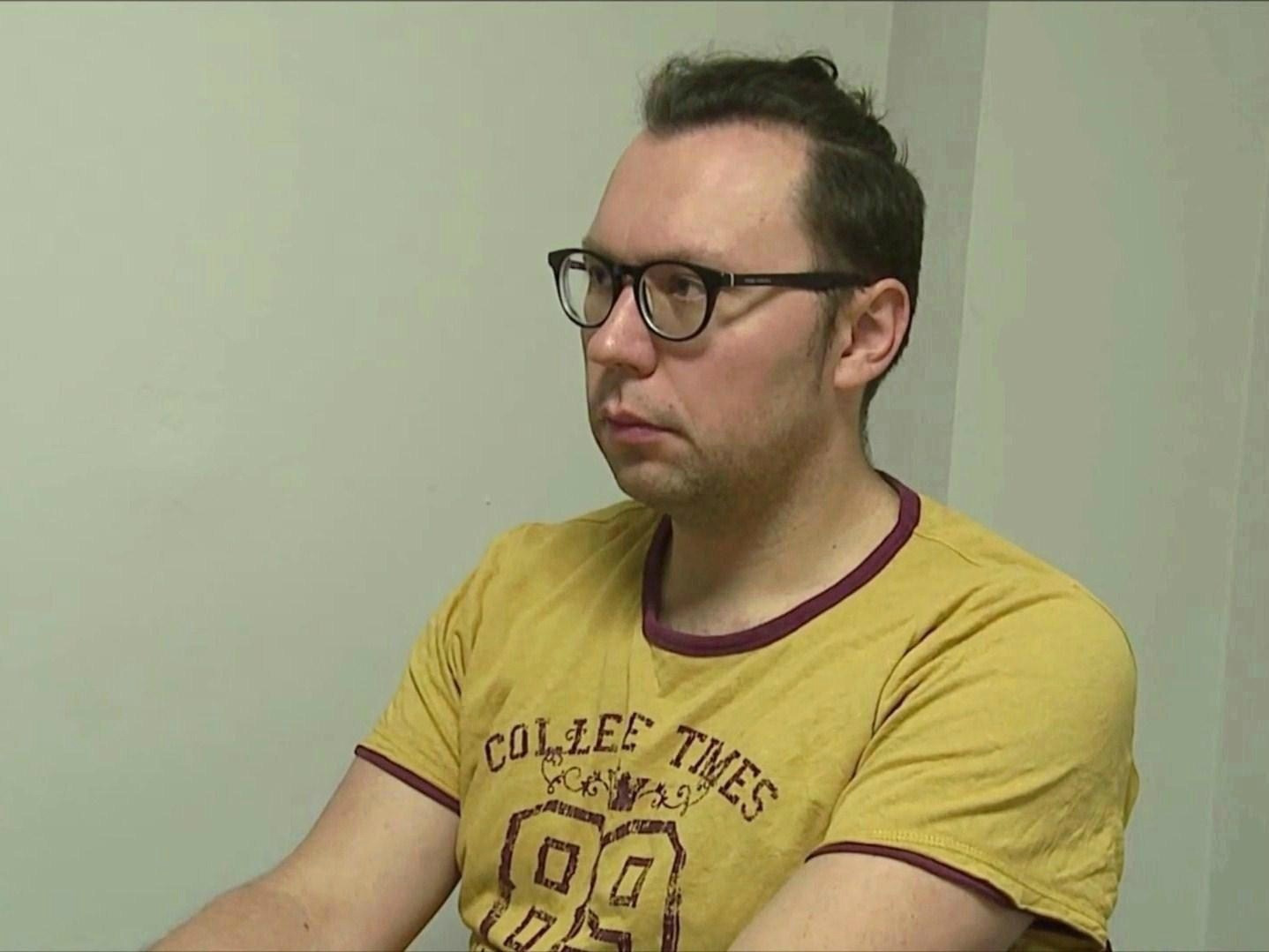
- Rafał Woś (2025)
- Born: 1982 (age 43–44); Myszków
- Occupation: Journalist

Rafał Wiktor Woś (born 1982) is a journalist and writer.

== Biography ==
In 2006 he graduated in international relations from the University of Warsaw.

== Books ==
- Dziecięca choroba liberalizmu. 2014. ISBN 978-83-64437-24-3.
- To nie jest kraj dla pracowników. 2017. ISBN 978-83-280-3627-7.
- Lewicę racz nam zwrócić, Panie!. 2019. ISBN 978-83-8110-729-7.
- Zimna trzydziestoletnia. Nieautoryzowana biografia polskiego kapitalizmu. 2019. ISBN 978-83-277-1740-5.
- Dług jest dobry. 2024. ISBN 978-83-67713-14-6.

== Accolades ==
In 2011 he received Polsko-Niemiecka Nagroda Dziennikarska im. Tadeusza Mazowieckiego.
