= Rafal =

Rafal may refer to:

== People ==
- Rafal E. Dunin-Borkowski (born 1969), British experimental physicist
- Rafal Kiernicki (1912–1995), Roman Catholic prelate from Ukraine
- Rafal Korc (born 1982), Polish Paralympic athlete
- Rafał Sznajder (1972–2014), Polish Olympic saber fencer

== Places ==
- Rafal, Alicante, Valencia, Spain

== See also ==
- Rafał, the Polish form of the male given name Raphael
- Rafał of Tarnów, Polish nobleman
