= Rafał Piotrowski (footballer) =

Polish footballer (1974–2024)

Personal information
- Date of birth: 14 April 1974
- Place of birth: Szczecin, Poland
- Date of death: 3 December 2024 (aged 50)
- Place of death: Szczecin, Poland
- Height: 1.79 m (5 ft 10 in)
- Position: Midfielder

Senior career*
Years	Team	Apps	(Gls)
1990–1991	Kotwica Kołobrzeg		
1991–1995	Pogoń Szczecin	37+	(0+)
1995–1996	Stal Mielec	25	(1)
1996–2001	Pogoń Szczecin	95+	(7+)
2000–2001	Lech Poznań	12	(1)
2000–2001	Flota Świnoujście		
2001–2002	Pogoń Szczecin	16	(0)
2002–2003	Zorza Dobrzany		
2003	Wacker Nordhausen		
2003–2005	KP Police		
2005–2006	Odra Chojna		
2006–2007	Victoria 95 Przecław		
2008–2010	KS Wołczkowo-Bezrzecze		
Total		165+	(9+)

Managerial career
- KS Wołczkowo-Bezrzecze
- * Club domestic league appearances and goals

Rafał Piotrowski (14 April 1974 – 3 December 2024) was a Polish footballer who played as a midfielder.

Best known for time at hometown club Pogoń Szczecin and Stal Mielec, he played 153 matches scoring eight goals in the Ekstraklasa., of which 25 appearances and one goal was with Stal. With Lech Poznań, then in the second tier, he made 12 appearances and scored one goal.

After retiring from playing, he went on to coach various amateur teams. He died in Szczecin on 4 December 2024, at the age of 50.
