= Rafał Kownacki =

Polish lawyer (born 1980)

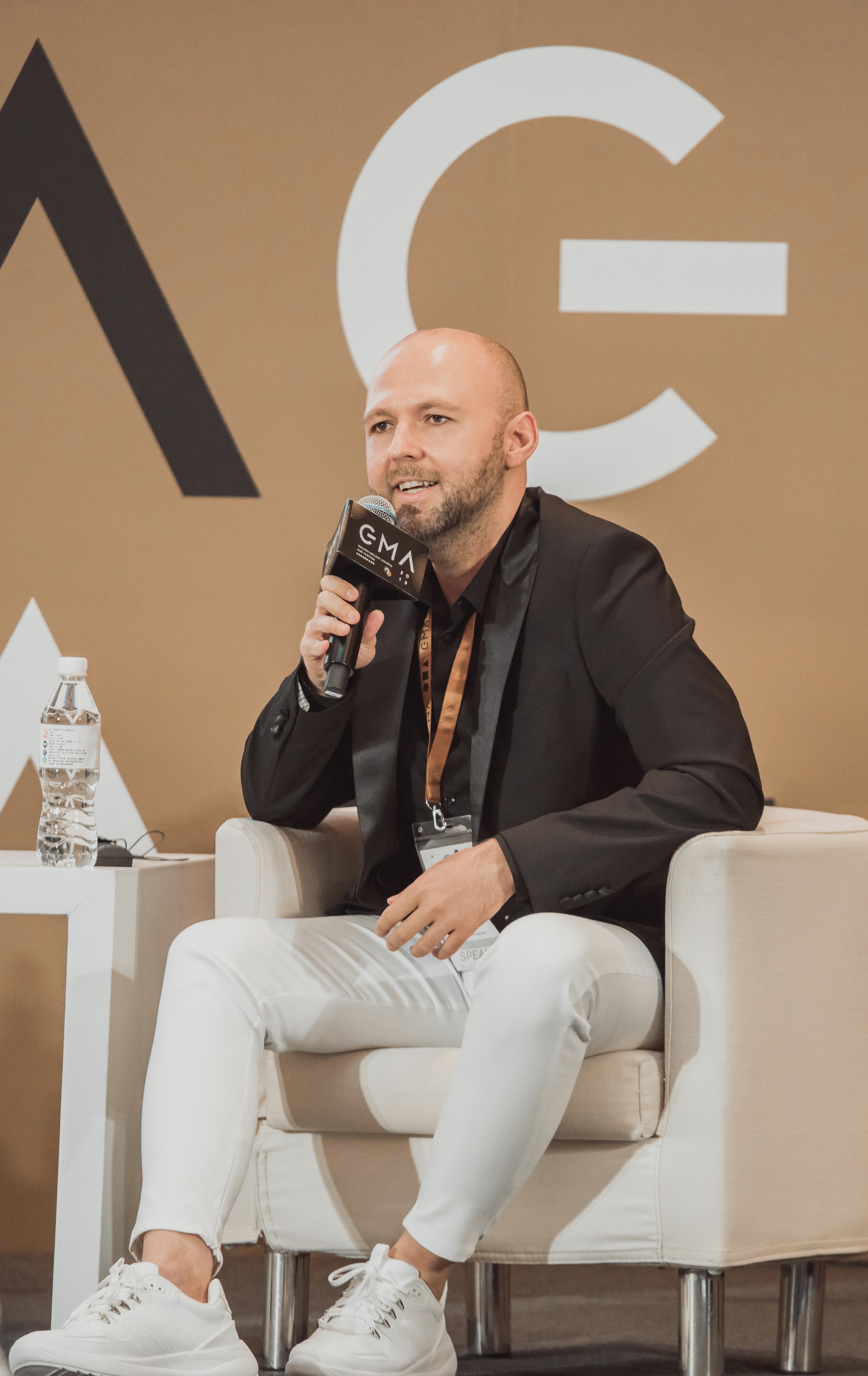
Rafal Kownacki @GMA2019

Rafał Kownacki (born November 14, 1980, in Ciechanów, Poland) is a Polish lawyer. He was the member of the Legal Committee as well as the Global Policy Committee of Confédération Internationale des Sociétés d'Auteurs et Compositeurs from 2017 to 2021. Between 2018 and 2020 he was the first Polish member of the Board of GESAC - the European Authors Societies’ . From 2017 to 2021 he was the deputy CEO of the oldest Polish collective management organisation - ZAiKS, then the Senior Legal Advisor at the International Confederation of Music Publishers.

Between 1997 and 1999 he was the chairman of Youth City Council in Ciechanów.

He has campaigned actively to protect human rights, served as a member of the board in Amnesty International Poland and president of the European Foundation of Law. He was a candidate of AI to European Economic and Social Committee (EESC). In 2007 he was awarded by the city of Brussels for his human rights activism. He was responsible for successful campaign in favor of EU Directive on Copyright in the Digital Single Market as well as Digital Services Act.

Apart from his legal education, he has graduated Human Rights Academy at the Helsinki Committee for Human Rights and School of Human Rights at the Centre for American Law of Chicago-Kent College of Law.

He is the lecturer at Collegium Civitas. Between 2007 and 2015 he was the secretary and member of the Chair of International Law in the Polish Academy of Sciences. He taught European Law and International Law at the European School of Law and Administration, Warsaw University and Academy of Diplomats.

He was the Polish coordinator of an international academic project WaCoPaS and member of the jury committee at the European Legal Olympiad from 2007 to 2015.
