= Zawada, Gmina Tomaszów Mazowiecki =

Zawada
- Village
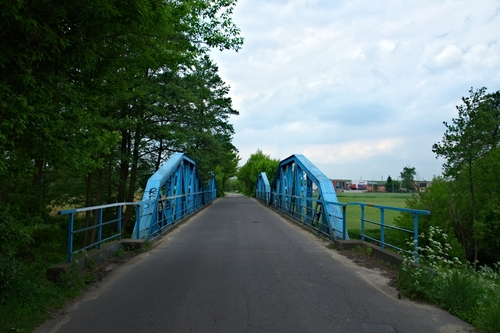

- Location within Poland
- Coordinates: 51°31′52″N 19°56′35″E
- Country: Poland
- Voivodeship: Łódź
- County: Tomaszów
- Gmina: Tomaszów Mazowiecki

Zawada [zaˈvada] is a village in the administrative district of Gmina Tomaszów Mazowiecki, within Tomaszów County, Łódź Voivodeship, in central Poland.
