= EC1 Science and Technology Centre in Łódź =

EC1 Science and Technology Centre
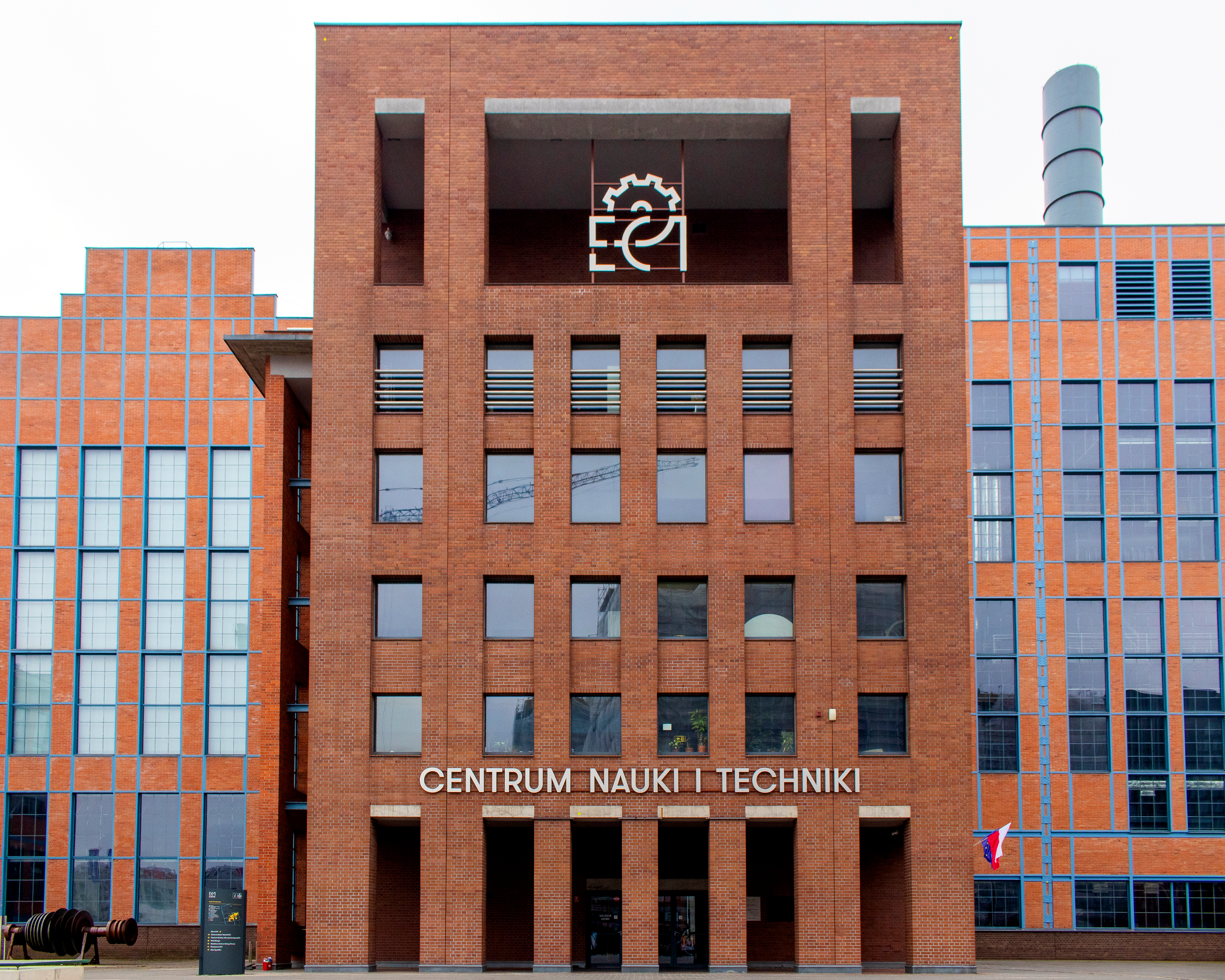

- Location within Poland
- Location: Poland, Łódź
- Coordinates: 51.767857°N 19.467911°E
- Type: Science museum
- Website: ec1lodz.pl

The EC1 Science and Technology Centre is a science centre located in the former Heat Power Station in Łódź, Poland. The Łódź Power Station (Polish: Elektrownia Łódzka) was a first city power station producing electricity for citizens. The plant was operational since 1907, was expanded in 1929, worked till 2000 and is regarded as a historical monument due to its architectural values. The EC1 complex underwent a process of urban renewal in the first decade of the 21st century; it was adapted for cultural and educational purposes. The EC1 Science and Technology Centre is part of the EC1 Łódź – City of Culture complex and functions as a museum of the former power plant, and a science centre.

The centre was opened on 7 January 2018. The institution is co-run by the City of Łódź and the Ministry of Culture and National Heritage. The name EC1 is an acronym referring to the later, but also to the historical name of the facility, i.e. the Heat and Power Station No. 1 in Łódź (Polish: Elektrociepłownia nr 1 w Łodzi).

The science centre is aimed at a wide audience; its goal is popularising science, technology and allowing visitors to perform experiments including: acoustics, electromagnetism, magnetism, fluid mechanics, optics, thermal conductivity, radioactivity.

== Exhibition ==
The exhibition area is over 18 000 m^{2} and the total cost of equipment was PLN 45.5 million (about €10.4M), of which nearly PLN 18.4 million (about €4.2M) is co-financed by the European Regional Development Fund.

The permanent exhibition consists of three thematic paths: "Conversion of energy", "Development of knowledge and civilization" and "Microworld - Macroworld". The exposition includes an auditorium, 3D spherical cinema and laboratory spaces divided according to the theme of the paths.

=== Permanent exhibitions ===
==== Energy Conversion ====
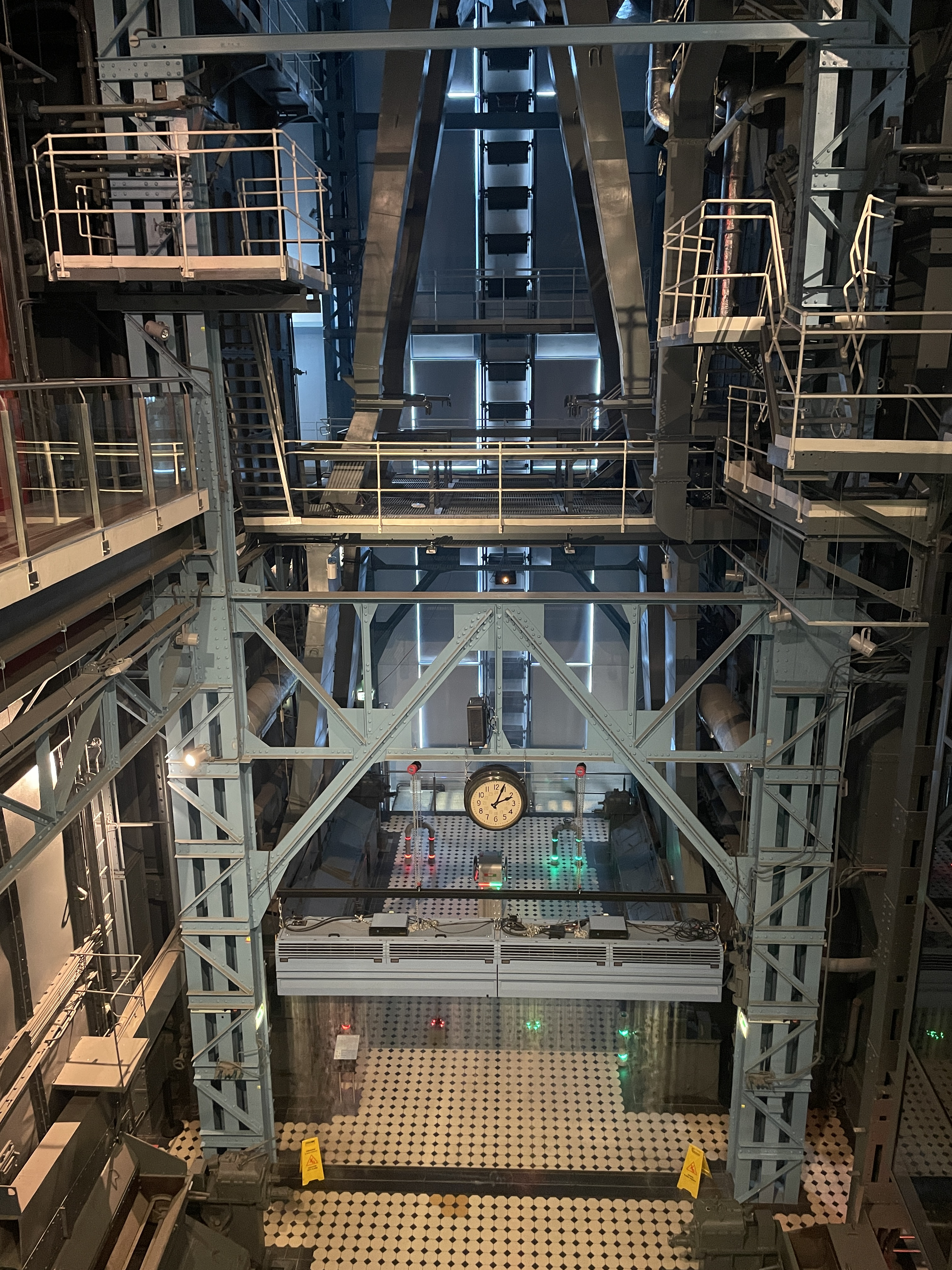
Boiler room, Energy Conversion exhibition at the EC1 Science and Technology Centre

"Energy Conversion" is the historical and technical exhibition focusing on the original character of the site at different periods; it presents energy conversion based on a conventional coal-fired thermal power station. The historical part of the path includes: stories of former employees, archival materials, history of the place from the beginning to the present, historical context of Lodz, importance for the Lodz city and national energy industry.

The technical part of the path focuses on the usage, transportation and importance of: coal, water/steam, air (oxygen), and the use and importance of the various components of a power station / cogeneration station in the production of heat and power.

In addition, the potential of using other fossil fuels is mentioned and a model for a nuclear power plant is presented in the subject of conventional energy. In the alternative energy topic, models of a geothermal power plant, a pumped storage power plant, a photovoltaic system, and a wind turbine blade are presented and discussed.

==== Development of knowledge and civilization ====
The "Development of knowledge and civilization" interactive exhibition presents some of experiments, discoveries and inventions that were the milestones in the development of mankind. Among them are simple machines and electromagnetic radiation.

==== Microworld - Macroworld ====
Microworld - Macroworld presents a visual and conceptual journey across scales, depicting objects ranging from the microscopic to the largest structures in the universe.

== See also ==
- List of science centers
