= National Centre for Film Culture =

Cultural institution in Łódź, Poland

Coordinates: 51.7681°N 19.4694°E

- Narodowe Centrum Kultury Filmowej
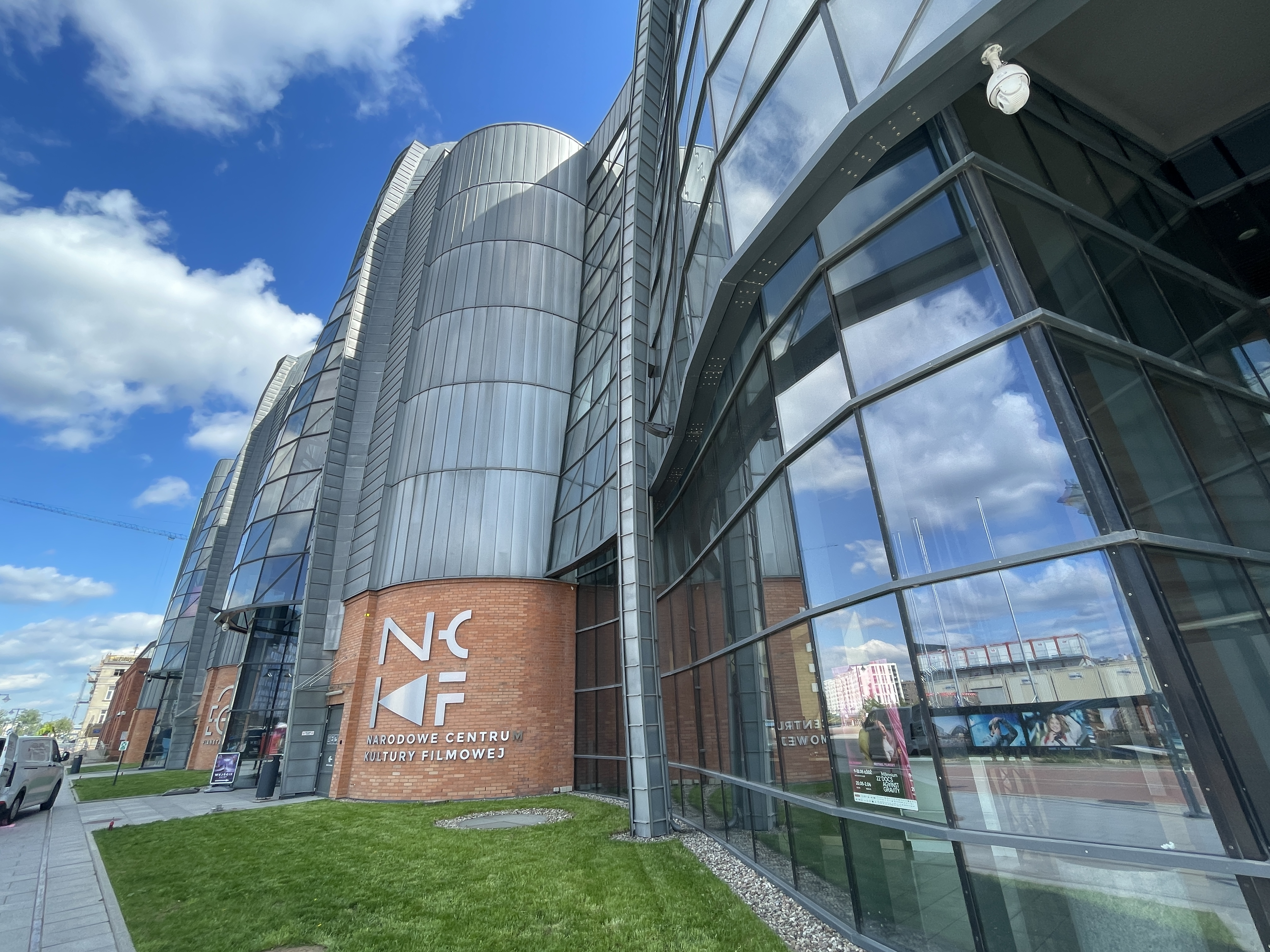
- Interactive map of the National Centre for Film Culture area
- Alternative names: NCKF

General information
- Type: Cultural institution
- Location: Łódź, Poland, Łódź, Poland

Other information
- Public transit: Łódź Fabryczna railway station

Website
- ec1lodz.pl/narodowe-centrum-kultury-filmowej/

The National Centre for Film Culture (Polish: Narodowe Centrum Kultury Filmowej, or NCKF) a cultural centre in Łódź, Poland, which belongs to the EC1 Łódź – City of Culture institution, co-run by the City of Łódź and the Ministry of Culture and National Heritage. NCKF is a cultural institution, museum, archive, conference centre and cinema. The mission of NCKF is to disseminate knowledge about film and to educate in the field of film and audiovisual culture. The permanent exhibition of the centre is the largest exhibition in Poland on national cinematography and presents 120 years of the history of Polish film.

== History ==
On 13 July 2015, the Minister of Culture and National Heritage Małgorzata Omilanowska and the President of Łódź Hanna Zdanowska signed a letter of intent concerning the co-run of a cultural institution by the Ministry of Culture and National Heritage and the City of Łódź. The initiative was related to the city's rich achievements in the field of film art. On 30 September 2015, an agreement was signed between the Ministry of Culture and National Heritage and the City of Łódź regarding the establishment of the institution. In the same year, Rafał Syska became the director of the NCKF; he served until 2024; Błażej Moder served as director in 2025 until the selection of Monika Głowacka in December that year. The institution was opened on October 13, 2023 in EC1 Łódź – City of Culture complex at 1/3 Targowa Street in Łódź.

== Activities ==
As part of its activities to date, the National Centre for Film Culture has reconstructed Kazimierz Prószyński's biopleograph and recreated the first Polish feature film, Powrót Birbanta, and prepared Łódź's winning application to the UNESCO Creative Cities Network as a City of Film.

== Exhibitions ==
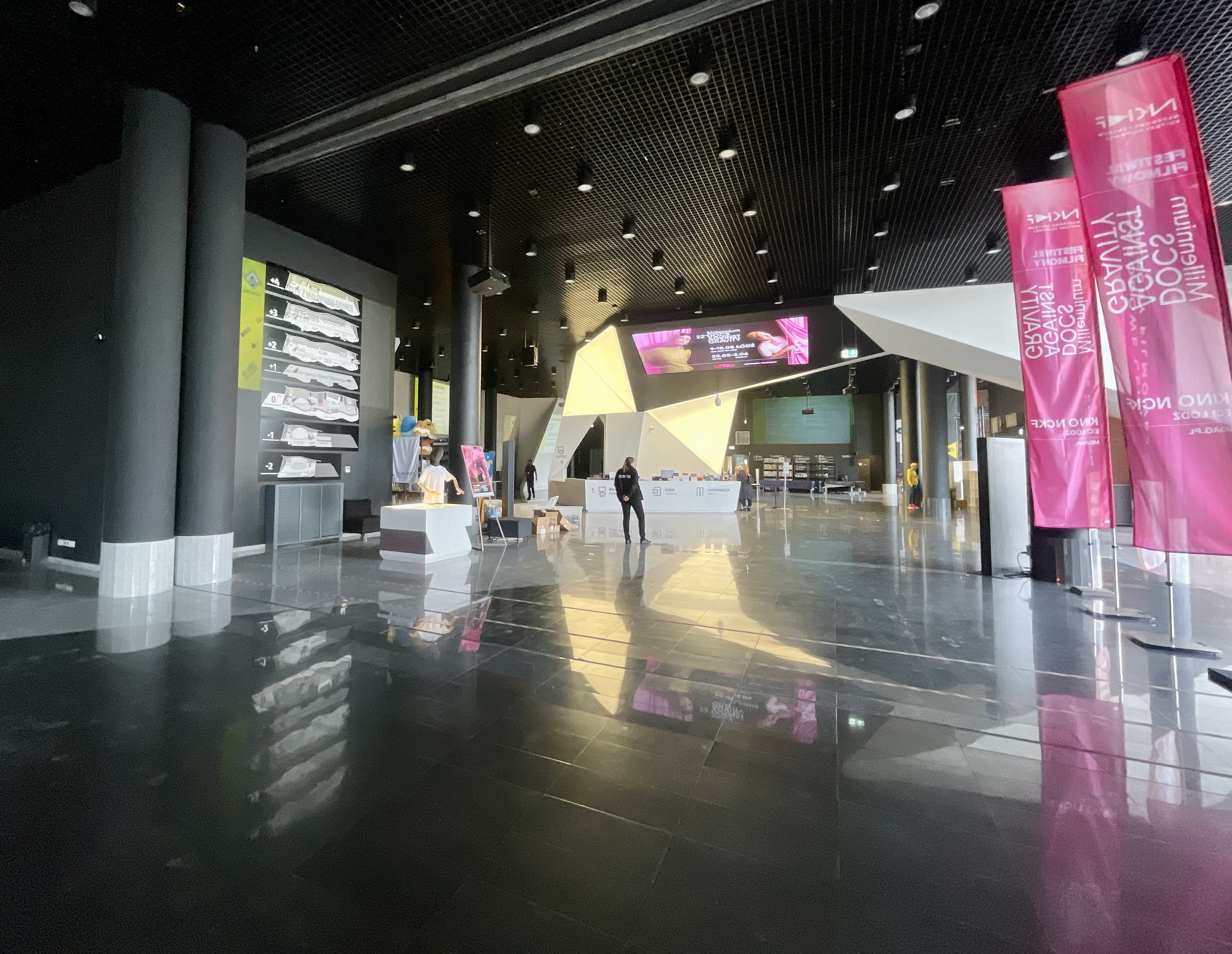
National Centre for Film Culture - foyer

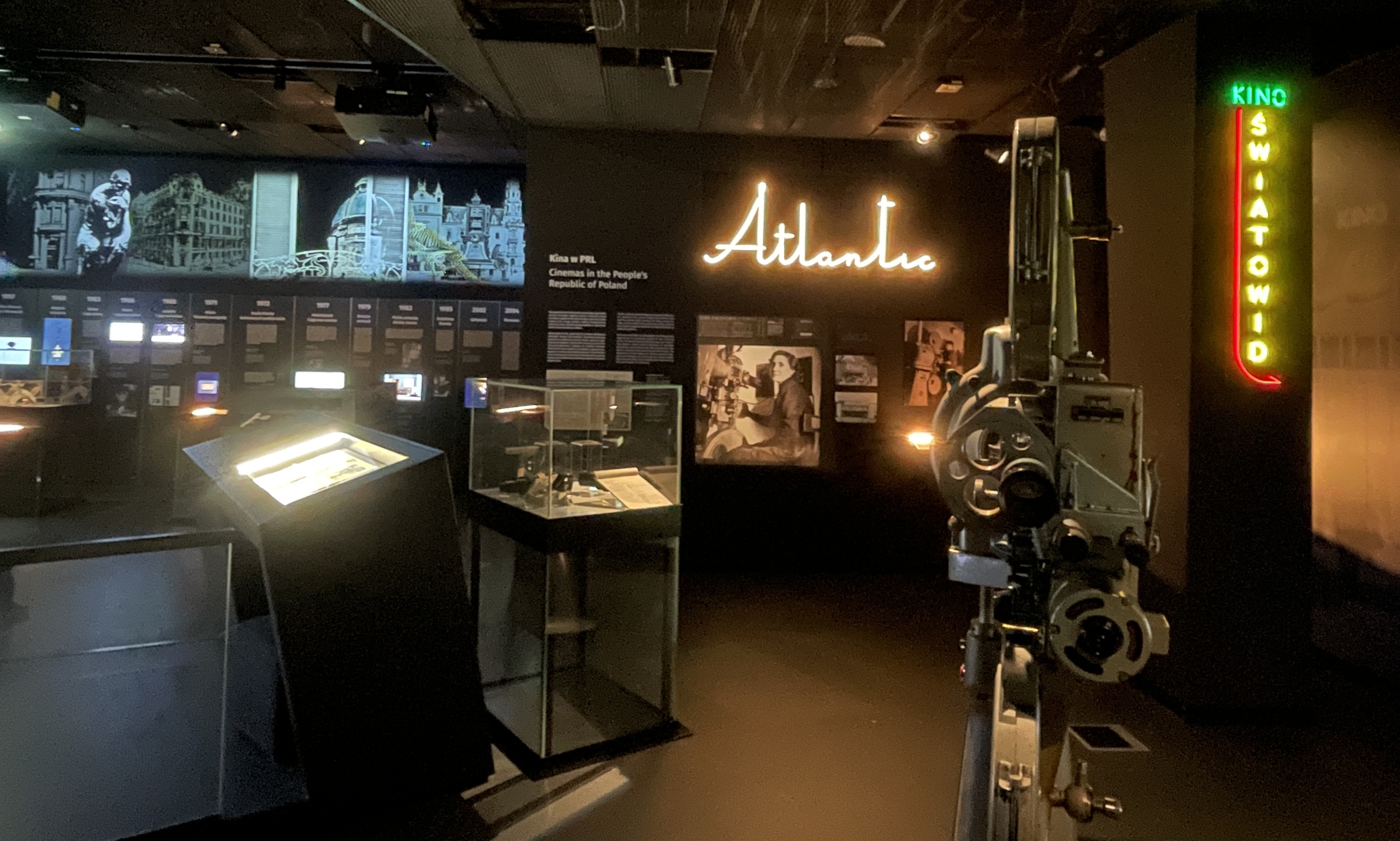
"Kino Polonia" exhibition

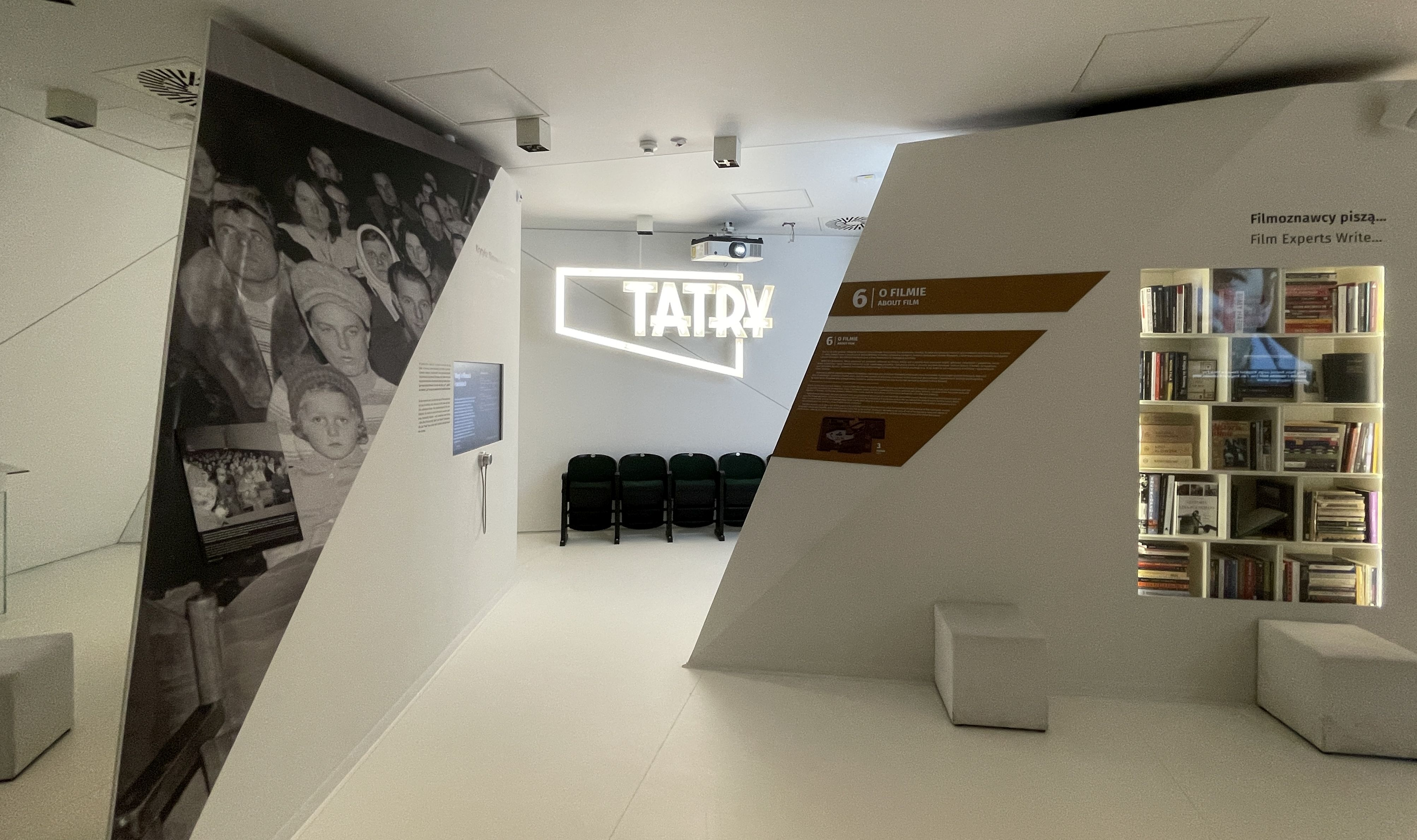
"Kino Polonia" exhibition

The NCKF headquarters hosts permanent exhibitions: "Kino Polonia" - presenting the history of Polish cinematography from the turn of the 19th and 20th centuries to the present day. "The Matter of Cinema" – presenting the process of filmmaking; "Mechanical Eye" (in progress) – presenting the development of film techniques.

=== Kino Polonia ===
The "Kino Polonia" exhibition, opened in 2023, is the main permanent exhibition at the NCKF headquarters and is the largest exhibition in Poland devoted to the history of Polish cinema, covering over 120 years of the history of Polish cinematography. The exhibition occupies three floors of the NCKF building and 1,500 square meters.

The exhibition presents the development and achievements of Polish cinema through various means of expression, especially through audiovisual media. An integral part of the exhibition is multimedia materials: several dozen film projections, projections of fragments of television recordings and animations. Visitors have the opportunity to interactively learn about the history of Polish cinema using touchscreens, models, audio guides, graphics and a rich soundtrack.

"Kino Polonia" presents a large number of films and artistic trends vital to Polish cinematography, including The Dybbuk, Eroica, Pharaoh and The Decalogue, Yiddish cinema, the Polish Film School, and the achievements of Polish animation.

The architecture of the exhibition is dominated by black and white, which allows for the film screenings to be highlighted and makes them the focal points of the exhibition. The exhibition includes hundreds of objects related to the history of Polish cinematography, including film posters, cameras, projectors, costumes, props and production documents.

=== The Matter of Cinema ===
The exhibition presents the process of making a film. Visitors can take on the role of producers and, using several interactive stations, learn about the subsequent stages of work on film production, creating their own film. Visitors start with production planning, then go through the budget, casting, work on the set, editing, sound and promotional activities. Visitors have access to a virtual assistant who explains concepts from the field of film and presents additional contexts.

== Cinemas ==
The institution has three cinema halls, whose names refer to former cinemas in Łódź - "Odeon" with 169 seats and "Luna" and "Urania" (49 seats each). The cinema halls are equipped with a Dolby Surround 7.1 surround sound system. The largest hall has been equipped with 35 mm analog projectors.

The cinemas host film premieres with the participation of creators: producers, directors, scriptwriters and actors, as well as reviews and special screenings for groups, festival screenings, reviews and academies. A two-level film library is planned. The EC1 Machine Hall has been adapted for film premieres and festivals.

== Film education studios ==
Film education is one of the principal areas of activity of the Centre; it develops educational programs for children, young people, university students, teachers and the general public through workshops, lectures, screenings and practical activities related to film history, audiovisual culture and the filmmaking process.

The educational programme is centred on the Film Education Studios – specialist facilities designed to simulate the principal stages of film production. The Animation Studio introduces participants to stop-motion animation and visual storytelling through workshops on storyboard creation, set design, costume design, make-up, character creation and film poster design. The Special Effects Studio focuses on contemporary visual effects techniques including green screen technology and motion capture, enabling participants to explore digital filmmaking and computer-generated imagery. The Television Studio recreates a professional television production environment in which visitors learn the fundamentals of camera work, directing, lighting and live television production by producing news broadcasts, weather forecasts and game shows. In the Sound Studio, participants record dialogue, create dubbing tracks, experiment with Foley sound effects. The Post-production studio is dedicated to digital editing, image processing and the final stages of film production.

== Łódź Film Commission ==
Łódź Film Commission (ŁFC) is a film commission operating within the structure of EC1 Łódź – City of Culture. Established in 2009 as the first institution of its kind in Poland, it was created to implement Łódź's film policy and to support audiovisual production in the city and the Łódź region. Its activities include assistance to producers of feature, documentary and animated films, television productions, commercials, music videos, video games and other audiovisual projects. The Commission provides support in location scouting, obtaining filming permits, coordinating cooperation with municipal authorities and public services, facilitating access to public spaces, and connecting productions with local companies and professionals. Since 2015, Łódź Film Commission has operated within the EC1 Łódź – City of Culture institution, and is located at the National Centre for Film Culture.

An important area of Łódź Film Commission's activity is the operation of the Łódź Film Fund, established in 2007 as the first regional film fund in Poland and one of the country's largest. The Fund awards co-production financing to feature films, documentaries and animated productions connected with Łódź or the Łódź region through their subject matter, filming locations or creative teams. Among the productions supported by the Fund are the Academy Award-winning Ida directed by Paweł Pawlikowski, the Oscar-nominated In Darkness by Agnieszka Holland, and Afterimage, the final feature film directed by Andrzej Wajda. Łódź Film Commission is also a member of the Association of Film Commissioners International and Cine-Regio, and cooperates with Film Commission Poland.
