= Centre for Comics and Interactive Narrative =

Museum in Łódź, Poland

Coordinates: 51.767°N 19.467°E

Centre for Comics and Interactive Narrative EC1
- Centrum Komiksu i Narracji Interaktywnej EC1
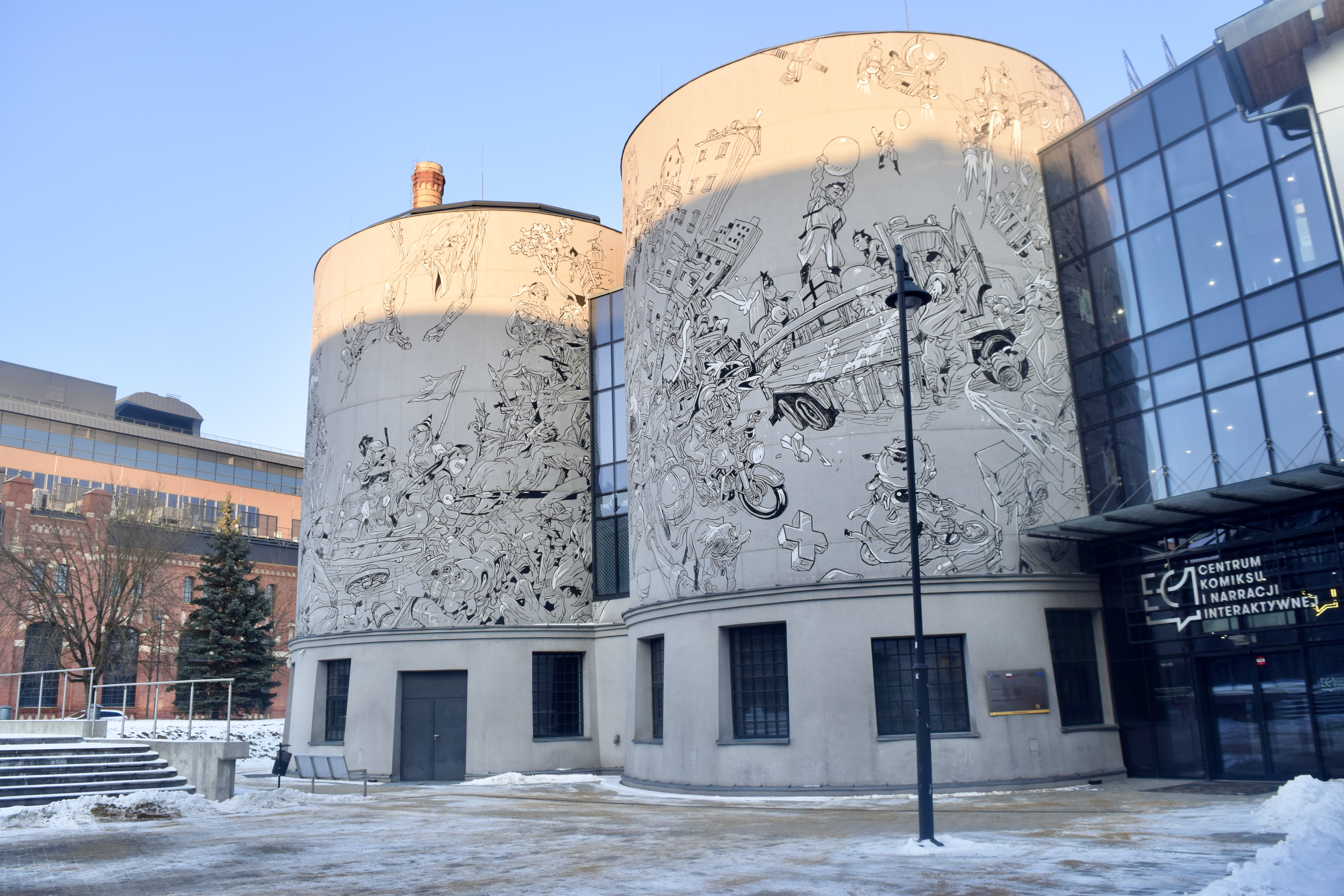
- Centre for Comics building – main entrance
- Established: 2023
- Location: Targowa 1/3, Łódź, Poland
- Collections: Comics, Graphic art, Video games
- Director: Adam Radoń
- Public transit access: Łódź Fabryczna railway station
- Website: ec1lodz/ckni

The Centre for Comics and Interactive Narrative is a museum in Łódź, Poland. It is dedicated to Polish comic art and video games. It is located within the EC1 – City of Culture complex, on the grounds of the former power plant on Targowa Street.

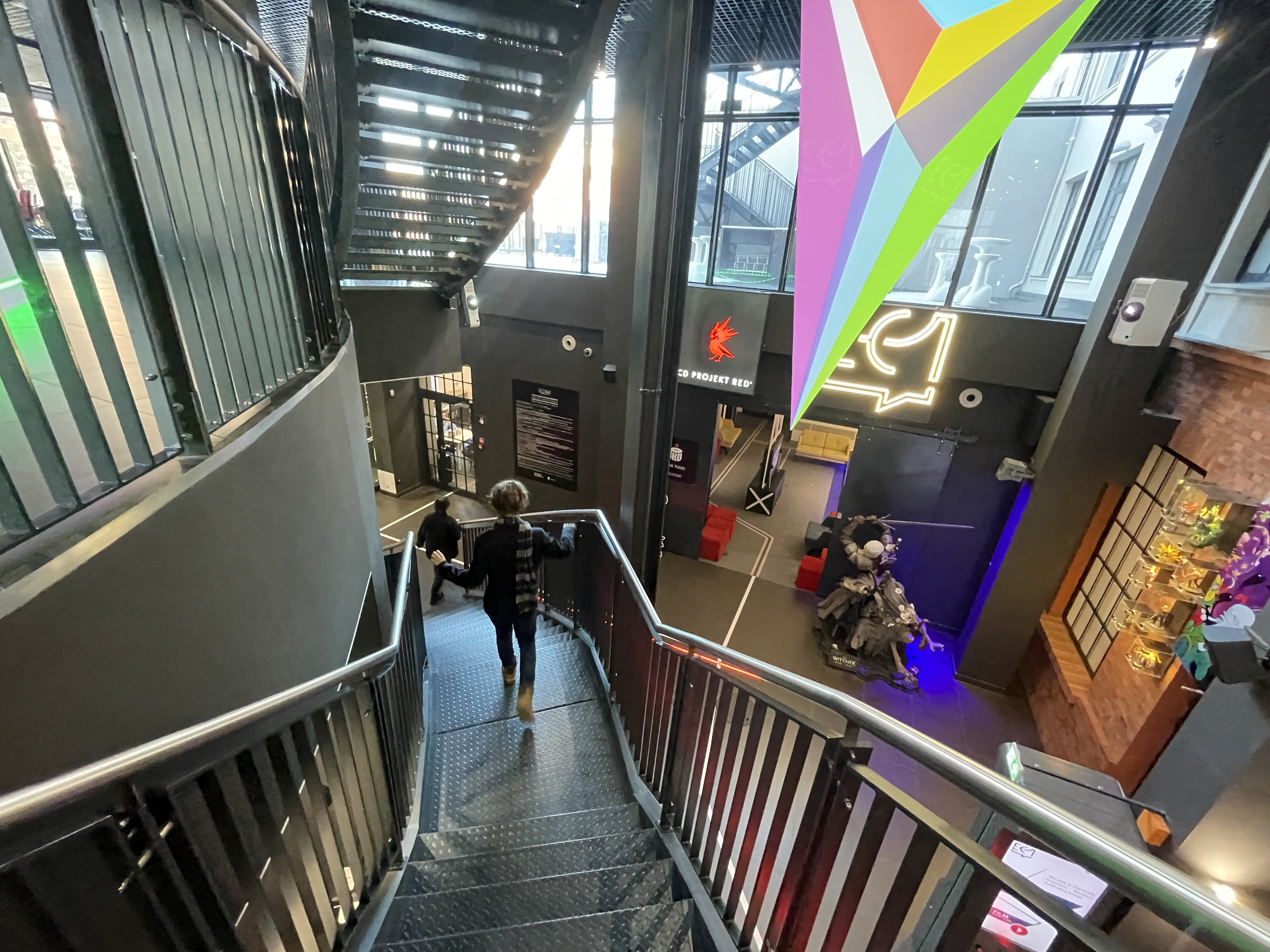
Centre for Comics lobby and staircase

The institution opened to the public in 2023; at the same time, it became the official organizer of the annual International Festival of Comics and Games in Łódź. The Centre is the first and only museum in Poland entirely devoted to comic art and video game art, and the largest museum devoted to comics and interactive media in Central and Eastern Europe. The mural adorning the façade of the Center for Comics was created by South Korean illustrator Kim Jung Gi. The Centre is managed by Adam Radoń.

== History ==
The initiative to establish the Centre was taken by Adam Radoń, who originally suggested its creation in Łódź in 2011. The idea originated within the Łódź community associated with the International Festival of Comics and Games and the "Contur" Creators’ Association. The prior success and growth of the Festival permitted Radoń and other experts to secure city support for the initiative.

The Łódź Centre for Comics was founded in 2013; its office was initially located at the House of Literature in Łódź, while conceptual work began for the creation of a new museum space within the revitalisation of the EC1 Łódź complex. In early 2017, a tender was announced for the creation of the Centre in a building which had previously housed the Se-Ma-For animation museum; a contractor was selected in July that year. Parts of the building belonging to the former EC1 power plant were demolished; the remaining structures were revitalized and modernised. The Centre was scheduled to open in June 2019, but the opening was postponed. The initial investment cost was PLN 21 million, with approximately PLN 14 million of European Union funding.

The Center's inauguration took place on 7 October 2023. It was combined with the opening of a monographic exhibition of Grzegorz Rosiński's work, entitled "Grzegorz Rosiński in Illustrations", presenting over 400 works by the artist. Following its opening, the Center formally took over the organization of the International Festival of Comics and Games in Łódź from its parent institution, the EC1 City of Culture.

The Centre runs both permanent and temporary exhibitions. Three permanent exhibitions are devoted to the history of comics, video game development, and the history of the gaming culture in Poland. Since its opening, the Centre organized several large-scale temporary exhibitions, showing the work of artists such as Tadeusz Baranowski, Grzegorz Rosiński and Przemysław Truściński. In 2025, the Center for Comics and Interactive Narrative was nominated in the "Wonders of Poland" poll organized by National Geographic Traveler.

== Permanent exhibitions ==
The Center spans three floors. Two main permanent exhibits are devoted to comic art and video game development. The exhibition devoted to comics allows visitors to explore the process of creating comics, and the history of comics in Poland. The game development exhibit presents the process of developing contemporary computer games; in the retro games zone, visitors can play games on arcade machines and vintage computers such as Commodore 64, Amiga, and Atari 8-bit computers.

=== The Anatomy of Comics ===
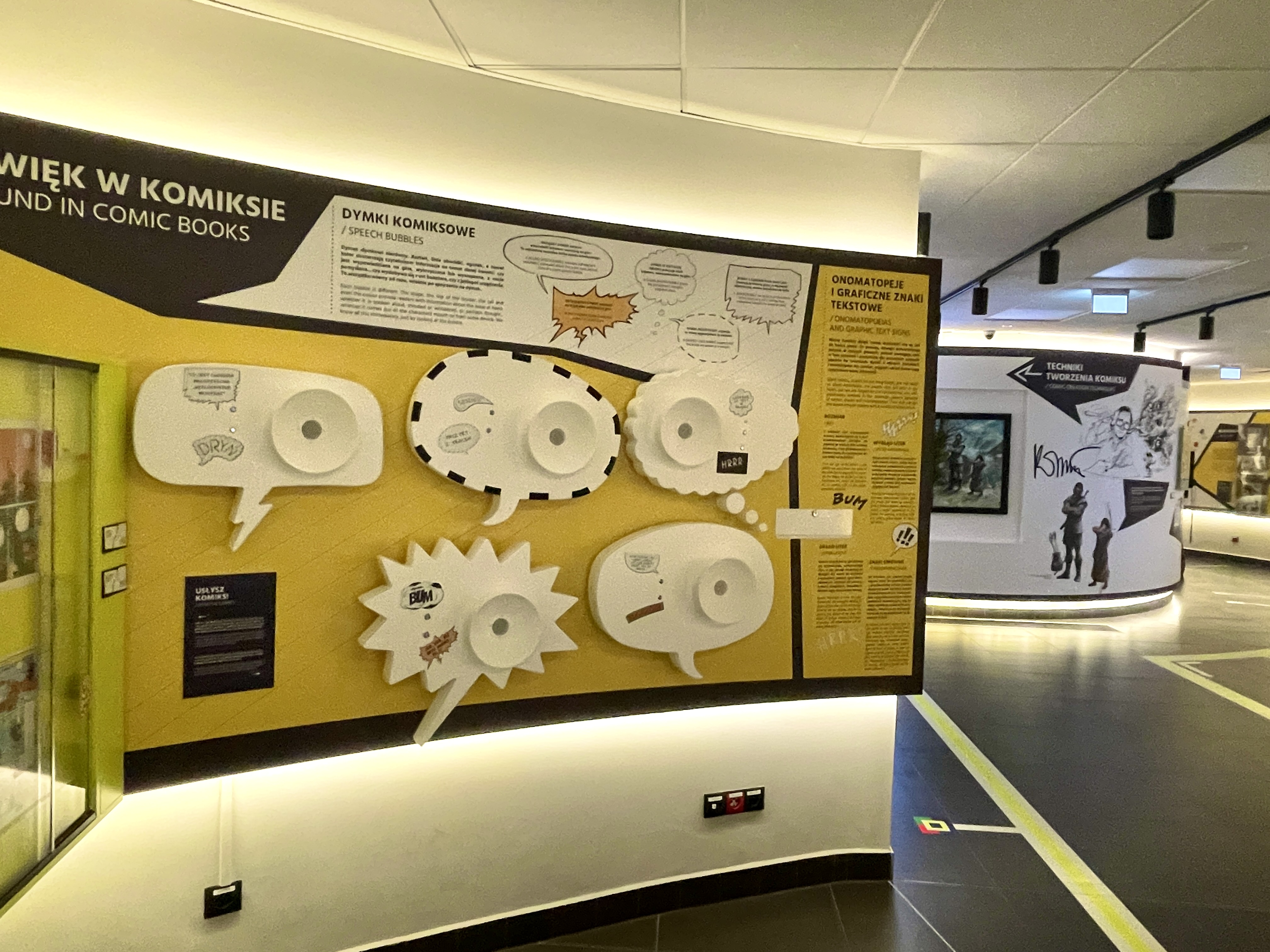
The Anatomy of Comics exhibition: interactive sound exhibit

The exhibition "Anatomy of Comics" is organized into thematic sections that present the structure, production process, history, and cultural context of comics, with a particular emphasis on Polish comic art. The exhibits incorporate interactive multimedia installations and recorded interviews with scholars and practitioners.

The "Language of Comics" section introduces comics as a medium combining sequential images and text, explains its formal elements, such as the panel, the gutter, types of speech balloons, and the function of onomatopoeia. It demonstrates visual strategies for representing the passage of time. The exhibition features the characters Tytus, Romek i A’Tomek as guides. The next section presents the techniques of comic creation and shows artistic methods – from traditional drawing and inking techniques to digital tools. Visitors can examine sketchbooks and compare graphic styles of established authors. This part of the exhibition is associated with characters such as Thorgal created by Grzegorz Rosiński. A separate area is devoted to comic script and explores the narrative dimension of comics, presenting the work of prominent Polish scriptwriters.

The section entitled "Genres of Comics" classifies comics according to subject matter, publication format, intended audience, and function, illustrating each category with examples drawn from Polish comic art; this part of the exhibition is accompanied by characters from the series Kajko i Kokosz by Janusz Christa. "The history of Polish comics" presents a chronological survey of over a hundred years of comic production in Poland. The presentation traces early illustrated narratives, developments during the interwar period, the People's Republic of Poland period, the 1990s, and the twenty-first century, highlighting major creators and stylistic trends. The presentation includes a timeline of notable Polish comic protagonists. The final section, "Comics and Other Media", examines the relationship between comics and other artistic and cultural forms, such as painting, literature, music, animation, games, and radio drama. It also touches upon contemporary transmedia franchises through the example of The Witcher, tracing its development from the initial short story publications through novels, comics, TV adaptations, and video games.

=== Game Lab ===
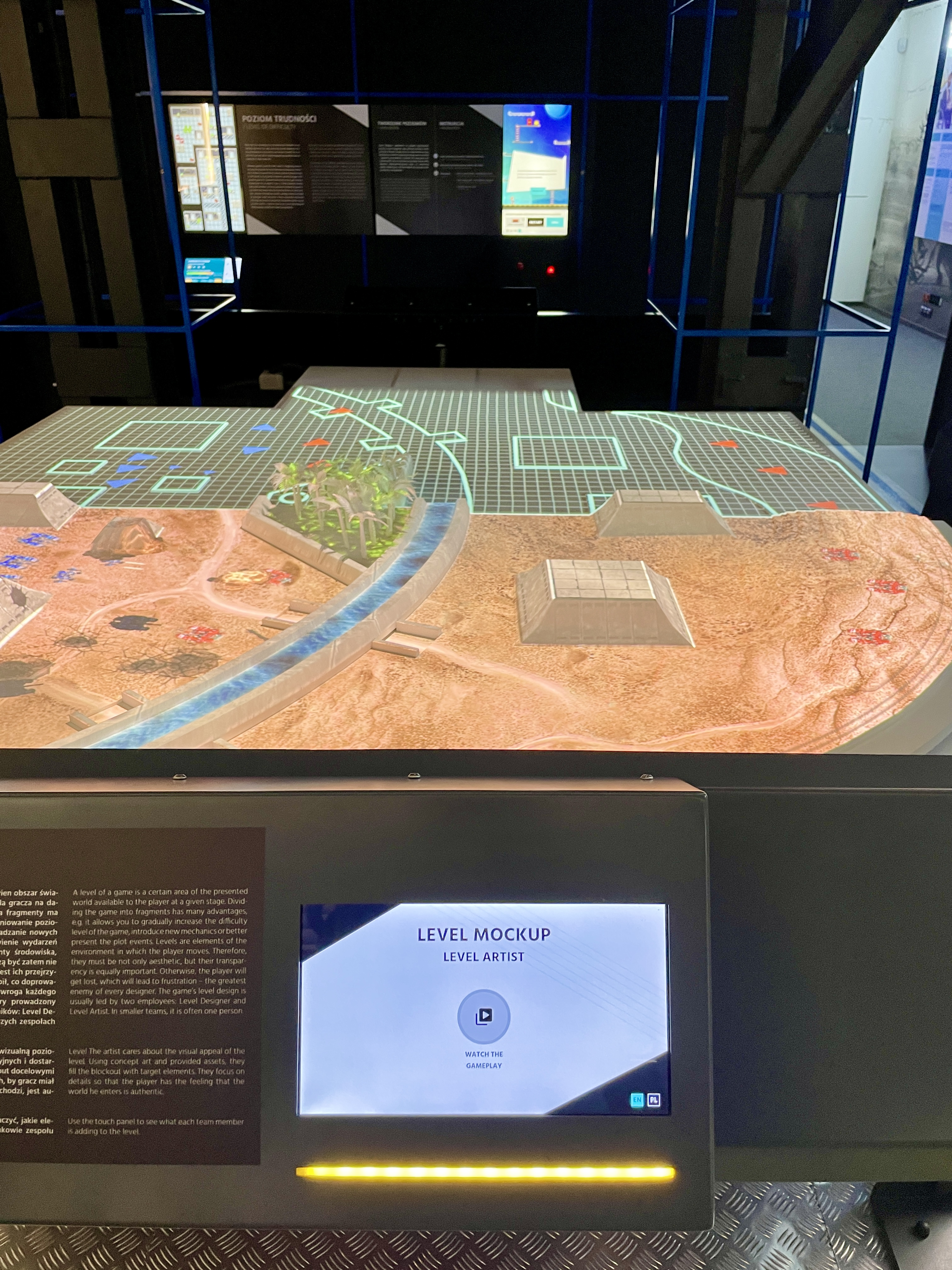
Game Lab; an interactive display demonstrating the layers of game level design

The Game Lab exhibition is devoted to various aspects of contemporary game development. The "Game Development Zone" presents the process of video game production through a structured interactive experience developed in cooperation with CD Projekt. Using the fictional universe of The Witcher 3: Wild Hunt as a case study, visitors are guided by the characters Geralt of Rivia and Ciri through successive phases of game development, beginning with the creation of a prototype and continuing through character design, environment and asset design, sound design and voice recording. Multimedia stations explain the function of each stage of a contemporary game production pipeline, including the roles of concept artists, designers, programmers, sound engineers, and quality assurance testers.

The "Game Creators Zone" is arranged as a series of themed rooms simulating a professional development studio, in which visitors assume specific roles within a game production team, including programmer, scriptwriter, level designer, and independent game developer. Each space contains problem-solving tasks and interactive assignments designed to reflect typical development challenges, such as constructing gameplay mechanics, planning the narrative structure, and organizing spatial progression within a level. The final room is dedicated to motion capture technology and demonstrates the technical process by which the movements of live actors are recorded and translated into digital character animation, allowing visitors to observe and participate in a simplified version of performance capture used in contemporary game production.

=== The Retro zone ===
This interactive exhibition allows visitors to experience the early history of video games during the 1980s and early 1990s. Interactive stations and exhibits featuring films, photographs and infographics present the origins of gaming in Poland. recreated gamers’ rooms allow guests to test the most popular microcomputers of that time: Atari, Commodore and Spectrum – and play the games of the era, such as Pac-Man, River Raid and others. The display is complemented by furniture, posters and decor of the decades in question.

The exhibition also features a reconstruction of an early 1990s Polish computer market, showcasing historical computers and consoles, but also the cultural and ethnographic phenomenon of computer markets themselves. Specialist books and magazines are also on display. Finally, visitors can see and interact in a recreated arcade housed in a trailer, filled with machines once imported into the country.

== Activities ==
=== The International Festival of Comics and Games ===
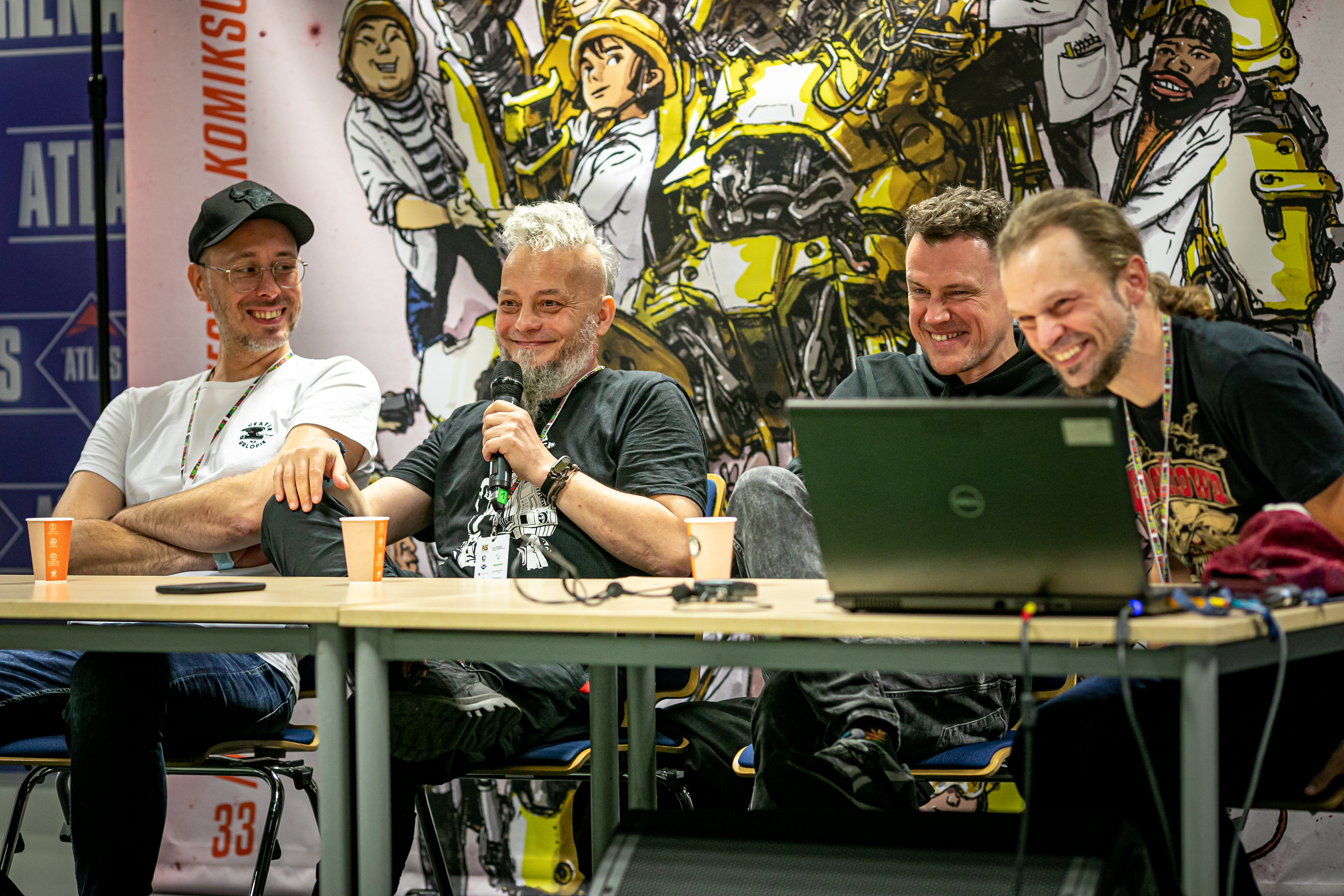
33. International Festival of Comics and Games in Łódź

Since 2023, the Centre is the official organiser of the International Festival of Comics and Games, which takes place annually in Łódź and draws over 20 thousand attendees. The event, dedicated to comic art and interactive games, is regarded as the largest festival of its kind in Poland and Central and Eastern Europe. Its programme encompasses multiple thematic zones, including comics (creator meet-and-greets, lectures, panel discussions, workshops on drawing and scriptwriting), video and board games (tournaments, developer showcases and free play areas), a commercial trade fair, competitions aimed at comic creators, and exhibitions in venues across Łódź.

=== The Kaiju Manga Festiwal ===
The Kaiju Manga Festival is a specialised pop culture event devoted to manga, anime and related aspects of Japanese popular culture. It is organised by the Centre for Comics and Interactive Narrative. It was launched in 2025, with a second edition held in March 2026. The festival is structured as a weekend programme combining a commercial fair of manga publications with lectures and panel discussions on manga and anime, meetings with creators and cosplay competitions assessed for costume craftsmanship and stage presentation. The programme includes contests for original kaiju character concepts and anime screenings.

=== Zavroty VR Festival ===
The zaVRoty Festival was held by the Centre for Comics and Interactive Narrative in January–February 2026. The festival was organised in partnership with the University of Łódź and presented narrative virtual reality experiences. The programme included immersive documentary and fictional works, as well as projects addressing topics such as dialogue between perspectives, mental health, and the role of artificial intelligence in contemporary culture. In addition to VR screenings, the festival featured conversations with creators and researchers and public discussions on immersive art.
