= International Festival of Comics and Games =

Annual festival of comic art and video games in Łódź, Poland

International Festival of Comics and Games in Łódź Międzynarodowy Festiwal Komiksu i Gier w Łodzi
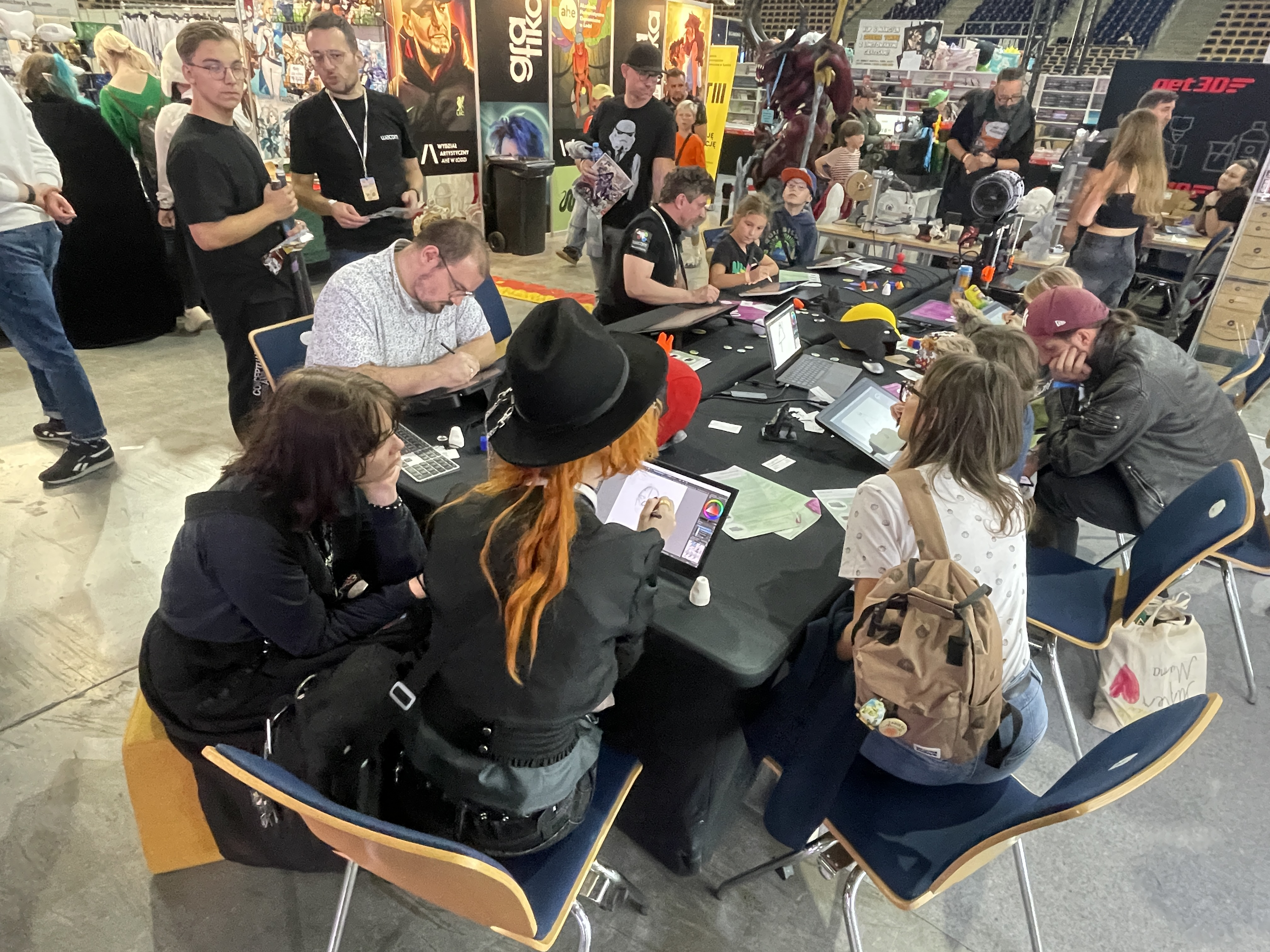
- Status: Active
- Genre: Comics, video games
- Date: September/October
- Frequency: Annual
- Location: Łódź
- Country: Poland
- Years active: 1991–present
- Inaugurated: 1991
- Founder: Robert Łysak, Robert Waga, Adam Radoń
- Leader: Adam Radoń
- Organizer: Centre for Comics and Interactive Narrative EC1
- Website: komiksfestiwal.com/en/

The International Festival of Comics and Games is an international festival of comics and video games held annually in Łódź, considered the largest event dedicated to this subject in Poland and Central and Eastern Europe. The festival's themes encompass comics in a broad sense, other types of sequential graphic novels, and interactive electronic media.

The event program includes meetings with creators, illustrators, set designers, game and comic publishers, gaming tournaments, workshops, exhibitions, and an international short comic book competition. The festival grounds also include a trade fair area, where visitors can find comics from around the world, books, and professional equipment for creators.

== History ==
In the beginning, the festival was called the Convention of Comic Creators. The first one was held on 2 February 1991, in Kielce. All subsequent ones were held in Łódź. The name of the event was changed to International Festival of Comics in 1999, during the tenth edition. In 2008 the "and Games" was added to the name, as the event embraced the area of computer games.

The Festival's special guests included Grzegorz Rosiński, Simon Bisley, Akira Yamaoka, Brian Azzarello, Eduardo Risso, Jim Lee, Stan Sakai, Marvano, Pat Mills, Clint Langley, Milo Manara, Jean Giraud, Tanino Liberatore, Zbigniew Kasprzak, Karel Saudek, Henryk Chmielewski, Tadeusz Baranowski, Janusz Christa, Bogusław Polch, Szarlota Pawel, Bohdan Butenko and Norm Breyfogle among many other international and local comic creators.

Each festival features workshops for cartoonists and screenwriters, led by experienced artists and experts. Lectures on comics, graphic novels and related fields, such as film and fantasy, as well as meetings with comic book creators and publishers, are also held. The festival also features a comic book fair, featuring booths from private collectors, publishers, and independent comic book publishers. The festival directors are Adam Radoń and Piotr Kasiński.

== Location and date ==
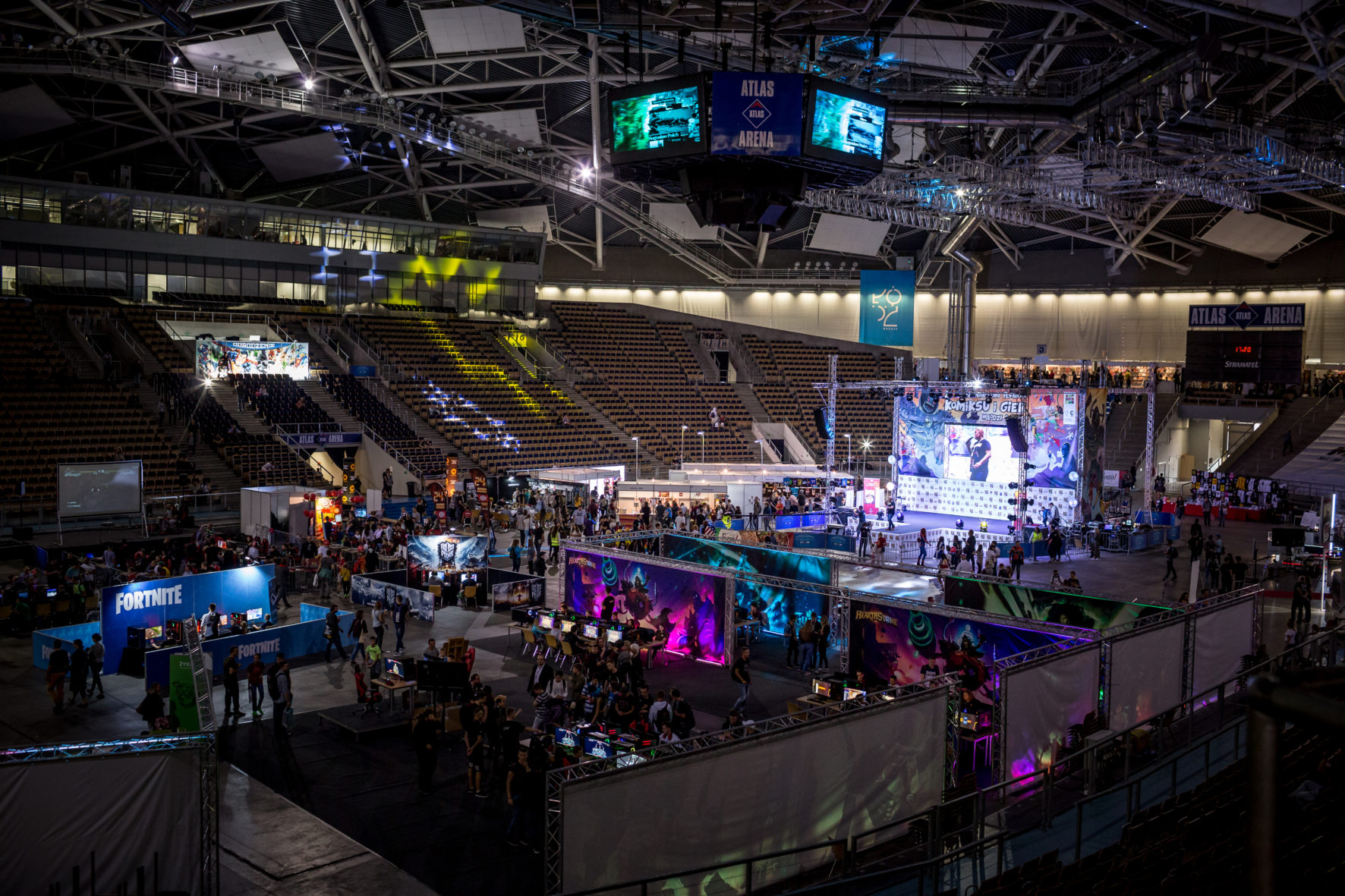
29. Festival of Comics and Games, interior of Atlas Arena

The festival takes place annually in Łódź, in autumn (in September or October), at several locations. The main festival venue is the Atlas Arena and the adjacent Łódź Sport Arena. Exhibitions and selected accompanying events take place at the EC1 Centre for Comics and Interactive Narrative. The 36th edition of the festival in 2025 will also be held at the Władysław Król Municipal Stadium.

== Program and themes ==
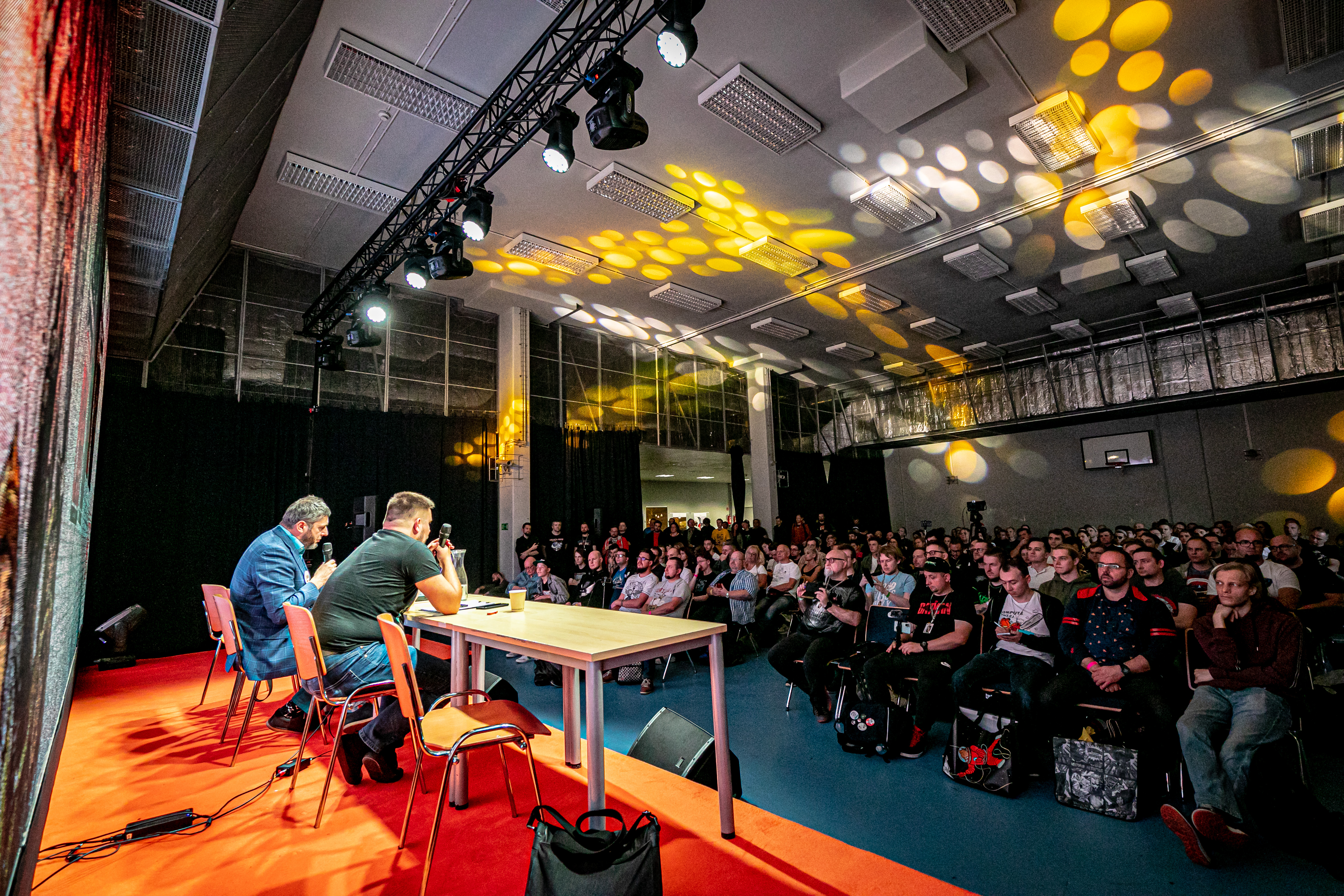
Talks during the 33rd Festival of Comics and Games, 2022

The festival program includes numerous events – workshops, meetings, presentations, interactive zones, and trade fairs – that form the main thematic zones. These include:

=== Comics ===
The comics zone includes author meetings, practical workshops, lectures and panels, retrospective exhibitions, and activities dedicated to fans of independent comics and Polish comics. The program features renowned international comics and graphic novel creators, as well as a wide range of domestic creators. It organizes outreach events and meetings with comics researchers, cartoonists and writers, publishers, and experts in the field. During sessions devoted to comics research, experts in the field participate in panel discussions and deliver lectures. The comics zone includes booths and events aimed at fans and connoisseurs of Japanese comics – manga and anime.

=== Games ===
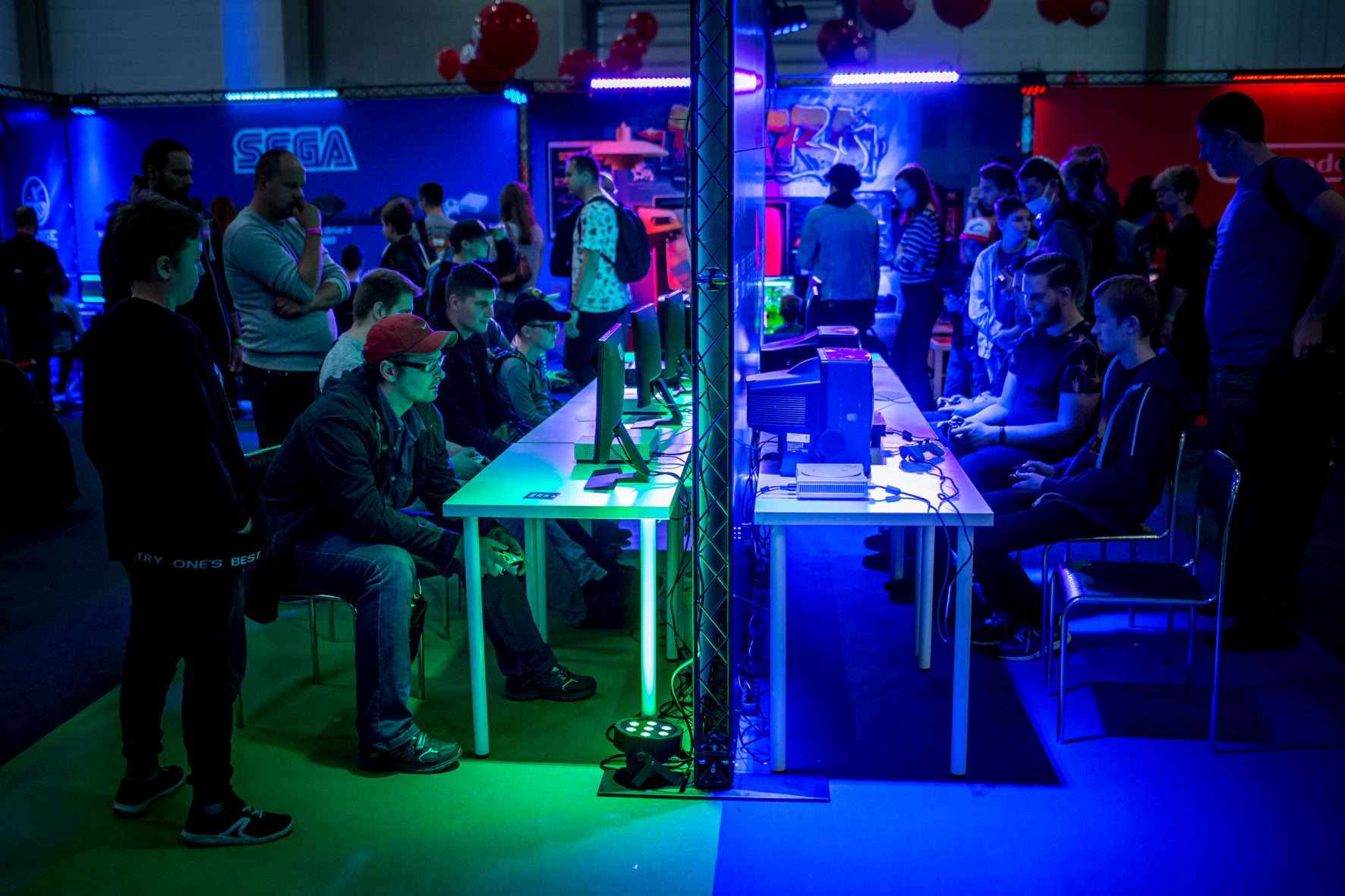
Gaming zone at the 30th International Festival of Comics and Games, 2019

Festival guests can enjoy dozens of games and interactive attractions, including both classics and new gaming offerings. The section dedicated to gaming history showcases working historical computers and consoles, such as the Amiga, Atari, Commodore, and Sega, as well as other personal computers from the late 1980s and early 1990s. Festival attendees can participate in LAN parties featuring online games from years past. Special events are also organized, such as a celebration of the 30th anniversary of the PlayStation console. In the Nintendo Zone, guests can play new titles on the Nintendo Switch, and in the VR Zone one can experience virtual reality, for instance, a tour of a digital comic book artist's studio.

For independent game enthusiasts, organisers showcase productions created by small teams. A prototype zone allows visitors to test games in development and talk to their creators. In a space dedicated to League of Legends, visitors can meet the game's champions, view props, and play themed board games. Meetings with game developers and journalists are also organized, discussing the behind-the-scenes aspects of game design, narrative in games, and the independent creative scene.

The gaming zone includes areas dedicated to board games: the "unplugged gaming zone." Participants can participate in role-playing game sessions based on various systems, such as Dungeons & Dragons, Warhammer Fantasy Roleplay, and others. Invited guests—board game creators, publishers, and designers – meet fans, discuss new releases, and answer audience questions.

=== Trade Fair ===
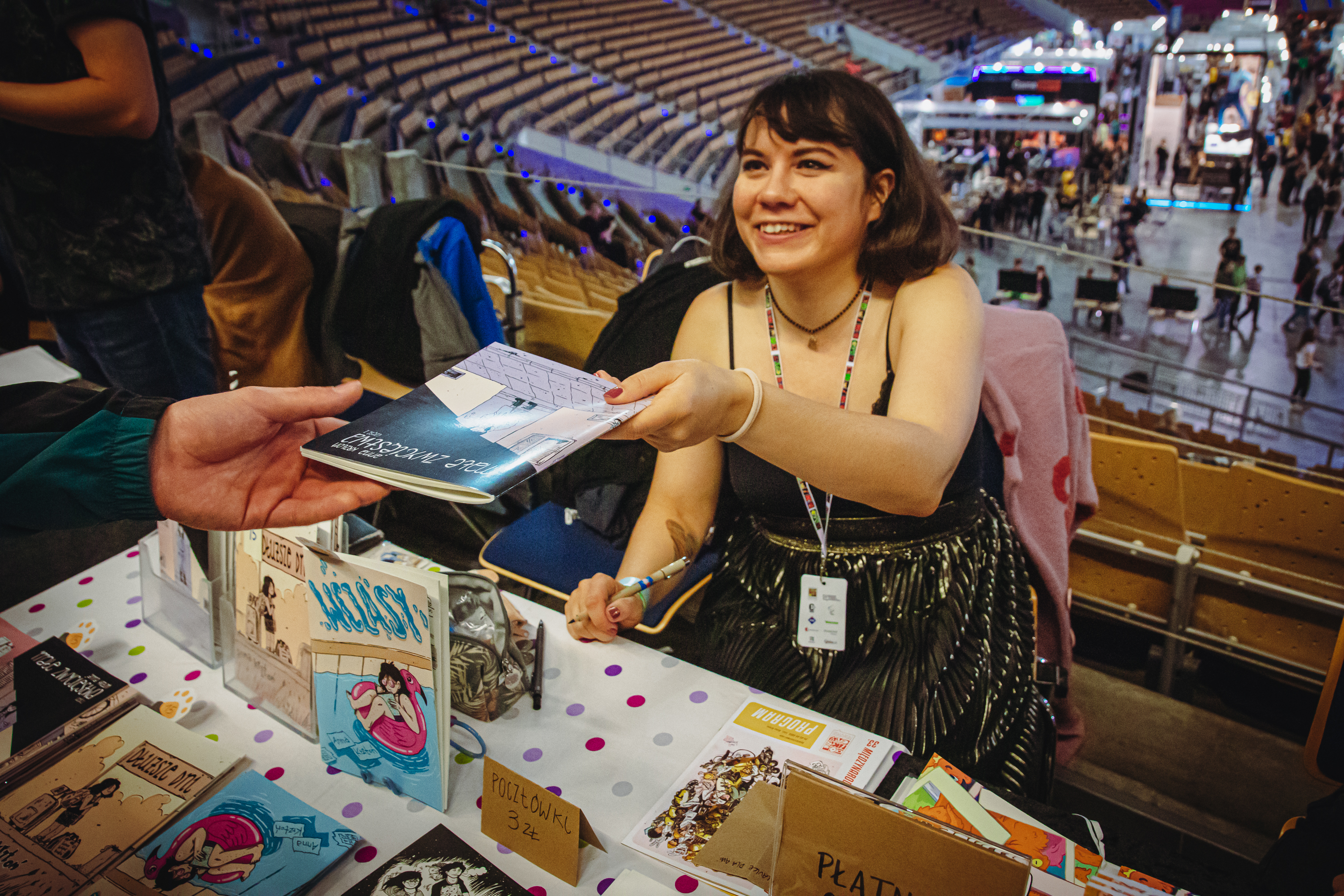
Illustrator Anna Krztoń at the trade fair zone, 2022

The trade fair area features booths from all major comic book publishers in Poland, as well as booths from smaller publishers, authors, independent fan art creators, and collectors. Nearly 300 exhibitors presented their booths during the 35th edition of the festival. In addition to comics, the fair also features books, games, special and limited editions of comics, magazines, and fandom merchandise.

=== Exhibitions ===
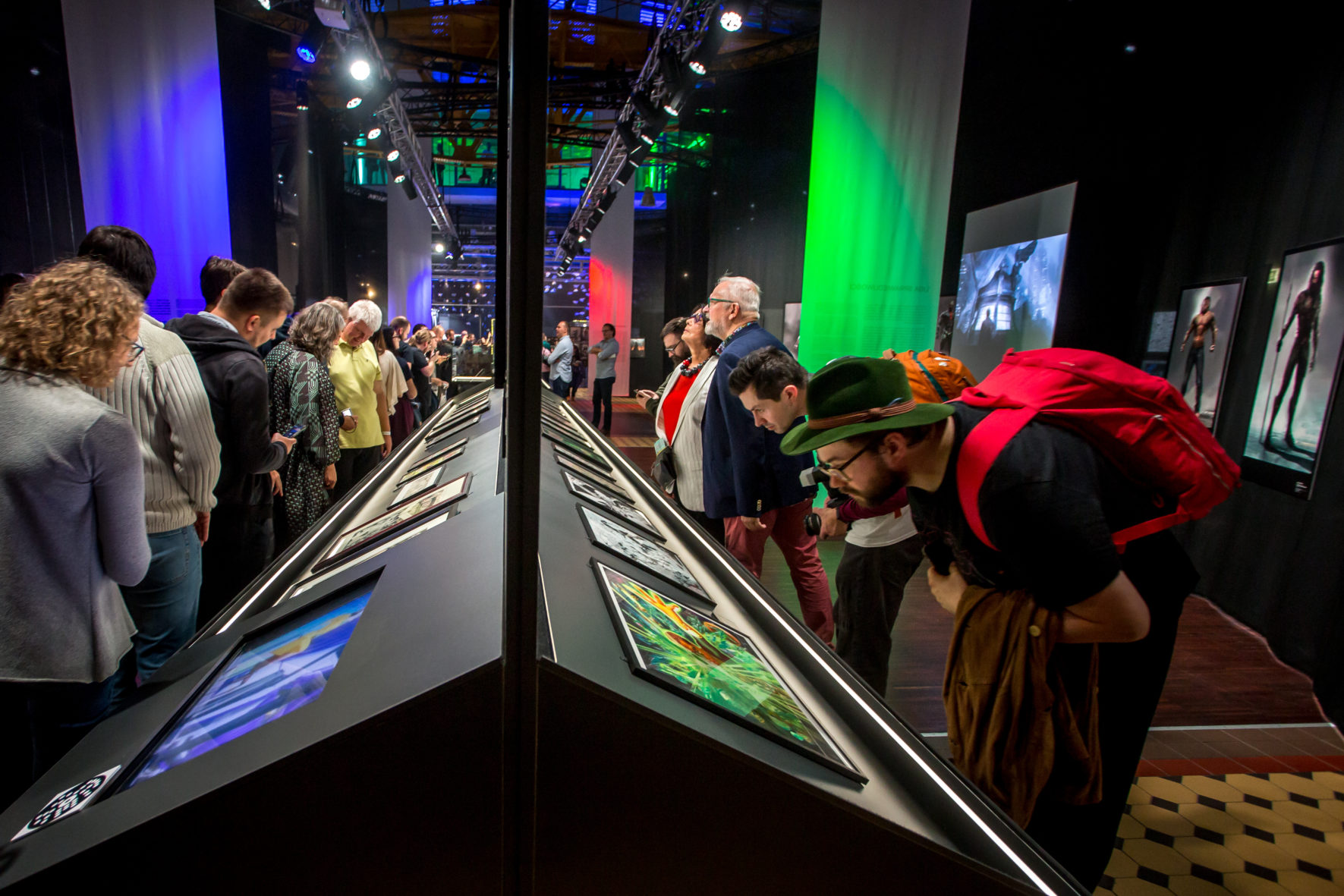
Exhibition at the EC1 Science and Technology Center in Łódź during the 30th Festival, 2019

The festival is accompanied by exhibitions of Polish and international comics, presentations by Polish cartoonists, solo exhibitions, and cross-sectional group exhibitions. During the festival season, at least a dozen exhibitions are presented, located in various institutions throughout Łódź, including the House of Literature in Łódź and the EC1 Łódź centers.

The 35th edition of the festival in 2024 featured a retrospective exhibition of Tadeusz Baranowski at the Center for Comics and Interactive Narration EC1. The 28th edition in 2017 featured a substantial exhibition presenting the creative output of Henryk Jerzy Chmielewski, which included full-size vehicles based on drawings from the comic series Tytus, Romek and A'Tomek, video games, and original comic book panels.

=== Workshops and Education ===
Invited guests lead various workshops for adults and children, including drawing, narrative and script creation and translation workshops.

=== Cosplay ===
The cosplay competition is an event for costume designers within fantasy, comics, and gaming. Participants are challenged to create a costume representing a character from the world of comics, manga, anime, and games, present it to the jury, and perform on stage.

== Contests and awards ==
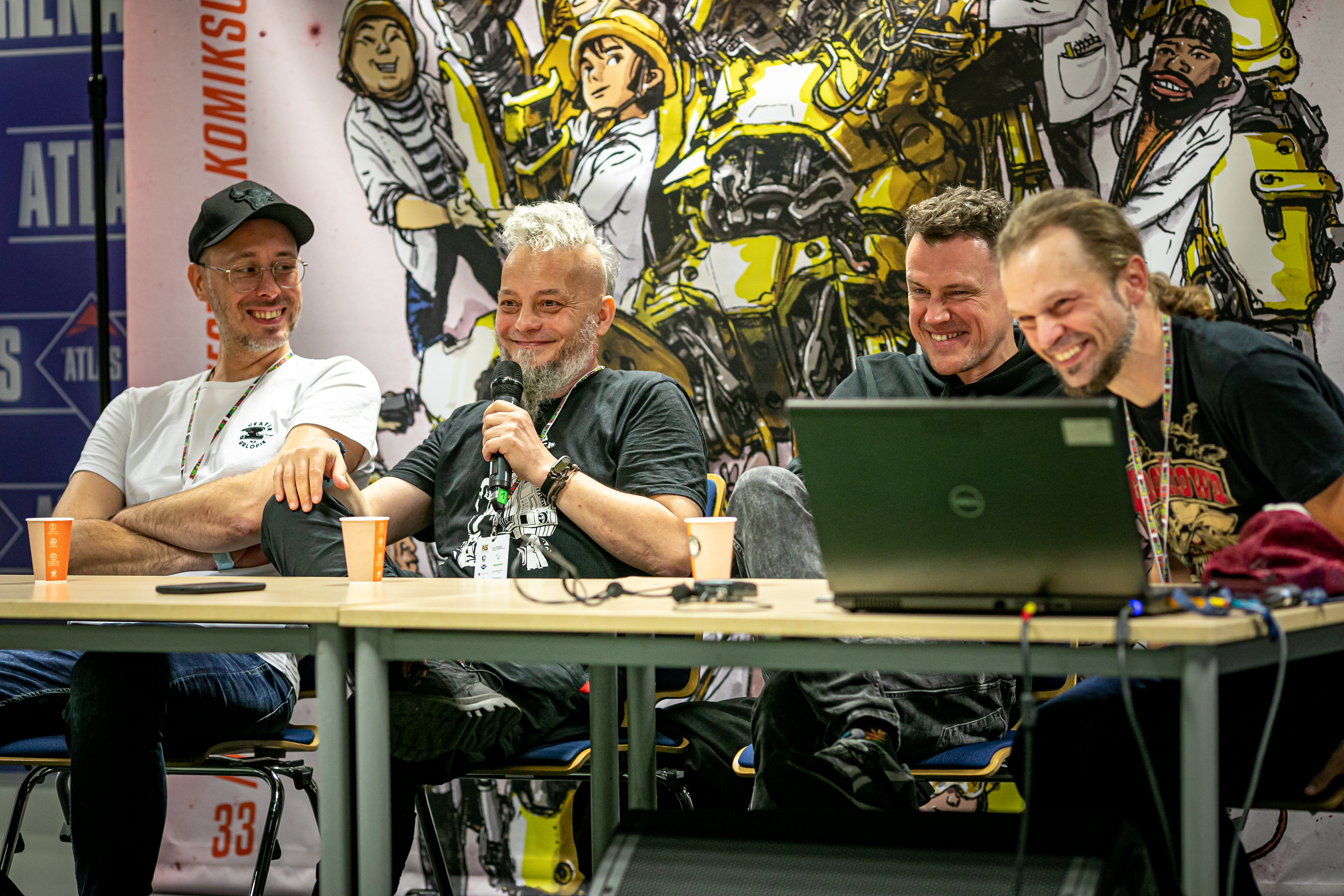
Panel discussion during the 33rd Festival of Comics and Games in Łódź

Each year a comic contest is held, where a special jury, composed of comic professionals and publishers chooses the best short comic submitted for the contest. The comic professionals and fandom prizes are also nominated and awarded during the Festival. Apart from the main comic book project award, several other prizes are awarded:

- The Papcio Chmiel Award is presented for outstanding contributions to Polish comics;
- The organizers also award a prize for the Best Polish Publisher and a prize for the Best Polish Album published between festivals;
- The Sophie Castille Translation Award is an international initiative intended to highlight the important role of translators in popularizing global comics in local markets. Prizes are awarded for translations into Polish, English, Italian, Spanish/Catalan, Slovenian, and Greek;
- Alongside the Festival, a short comic book design competition for children and young people is also held, with a different theme for each edition.

=== Comic Book Design Competition ===
This is a competition for comic book creators, in which the jury awards the best work with a Grand Prix statuette. Participants prepare a publication design – a fragment of a planned longer comic book, using their chosen technique (drawing, painting, computer graphics, photography, or mixed media). The works are judged by a jury. Before 2022, this competition operated under a different formula, under the name International Short Comics Competition.
