= Nicolas Nemiri =

French comic book artist

- Born: January 3, 1975 (age 51) Mulhouse, France
- Area: Comic book artist

Nicolas Nemiri (born 3 January 1975, in Mulhouse, France) is a French comic book artist.

== Early life and career ==
As a child, Nemiri had a great passion for books and admiration for French "bande-dessinée" artists such as Jean Giraud / Moebius, Hugo Pratt and André Franquin. He attended the Beaux Art d'Angoulême art school for three years, during which he met and befriended Dominique Bertail and Marc Rigoux. At the age of 20, after living on small jobs and a few illustrations done for Japanese fashion magazines, Nemiri's mother sent some sketches to Éditions Glénat in 1998. Author Jean-David Morvan offered Nemiri his first job and the two have since then worked on numerous collaborations, notably "Je suis morte" and "Hyper l'hyppo" (2005).

In 2023, he co-created the short animated film, Ruthless Blade, with director Zhang Bo as a part of the Capsules anthology. It was included in the 2024 Tribeca Film Festival official selection. He is also currently part of Superani, a creative studio started by Kim Jung Gi and Kim Hyun Jin.

== Bibliography ==
- Nemiri book (2017)
- Le chat d'Enoshima (2016)
- Annie Zoo (with Morvan, 2009)
- Alice in Mirrorland (serialized in Mandala, 2008)
- Je suis morte: Comprende (with Morvan, 2008)
- Hyper l'hippo (with Morvan, 2005)
- Je suis morte: Apprendre (with Morvan, 2003)
- Spirou and Fantasio #48 (with Morvan, Munuera, Glogo and Lerolle, 2005)
- Spirou and Fantasio #3429 (with Morvan, 2003)

== Filmography ==
- Ruthless Blade (喵十一) (2023)
- Un soupçon d'innocence (contributed drawings, 2011)
