= Piotr Kasiński =

Piotr Kasiński (born 1972 in Cieszyn) is a Polish cultural animator, comics scriptwriter, and journalist.

== Biography ==
He graduated in journalism from the Faculty of Journalism and Political Science at the University of Warsaw. After completing his studies, he worked as a newspaper journalist for several years, including for Dziennik Łódzki, Dziennik, and the monthly magazine Kalejdoskop. He also worked for local government cultural institutions.

Since 2006 he has been employed as a specialist at the Centre for Comics and Interactive Narrative at EC1 Łódź – City of Culture. Since 1998, he has been involved in organizing the International Festival of Comics and Games in Łódź, later becoming its artistic director. He has also received a scholarship from the Polish Ministry of Culture and National Heritage in the field of visual arts.

He has co-organized numerous international exhibitions devoted to Polish comics and is actively engaged in promoting knowledge about comics and educating audiences about the language of comics. He is the co-author of the books Zrób sobie komiks (Make Your Own Comic) and the Pik i Robi series. He also founded the fanzine eMeFKa News. In addition, he writes comic book scripts, both for his own projects and on commission, including promotional, advertising, and educational comics. Artists who have illustrated his scripts include Robert Trojanowski, Tomasz Tomaszewski, Tomasz Piorunowski, and Paweł Kwiatkowski.

== Distinctions ==
- Decoration of Honor Meritorious for Polish Culture – awarded in 2009.

== Publications ==
- Kasiński, Piotr; Kiliś, R.; Tomaszewski, T. Antologia: Międzynarodowy Festiwal Komiksu w Łodzi 2004 (Anthology: International Festival of Comics in Łódź 2004). Łódzki Dom Kultury, 2004.
- Kasiński, Piotr. Tajemnice Łódzkiego, czyli Pik i Robi na tropie myślenia projektowego (The Secrets of Łódzkie, or Pik and Robi on the Trail of Design Thinking). Marshal's Office of the Łódź Voivodeship, 2015.
- Kasiński, Piotr; Trojanowski, Robert. Zrób sobie komiks (Make Your Own Comic). Społeczny Instytut Wydawniczy Znak, 2018
