= Henryk Chmielewski =

Henryk Chmielewski may refer to:

- Henryk Chmielewski (comics) (born 1923), Polish comic book artist
- Henryk Chmielewski (boxer) (1914–1998), Polish Olympic boxer
