= Adam Radoń =

Polisth graphic designer

- Born: 8 July 1971 (age 55); Brodnica, Poland
- Education: Academy of Fine Arts, Łódź
- Occupations: Graphic designer, cultural manager
- Title: Director of the International Festival of Comics and Games, head of the Centre for Comics and Interactive Narrative in Łódź
- Awards: Knight of the Order of Leopold II

Adam Radoń (born July 8, 1971, in Brodnica) is a graphic designer, cultural manager, and long-time director of the International Festival of Comics and Games in Łódź, and initiator of numerous activities promoting the art of comics in Poland. He is the head of the Centre for Comics and Interactive Narrative in Łódź, a department of the EC1 Łódź – City of Culture institution.

== Biography ==
Adam Radoń was born in Brodnica and grew up in Łódź. From an early age, he was interested in drawing, art, and particularly comics. He graduated from the Secondary School of Fine Arts in Łódź and then studied at the Faculty of Graphic Arts at the Władysław Strzemiński Academy of Fine Arts in Łódź. After graduating, he worked as a graphic designer and illustrator for Telewizja Polska, Bank Ochrony Środowiska, advertising agencies and music companies. He also worked as a producer of concerts, exhibitions, and events.

=== Role in establishing the International Festival of Comics and Games ===
Adam Radoń has been involved in the creation of the International Festival of Comics and Games in Łódź since its inception. In 1990, he was one of the founders of the "Contur" Association of Creators, bringing together creators, experts, and comics enthusiasts. For several years, "Contur" operated as an informal group; in 1994, its members founded an association whose activities resulted in the organization of the first editions of the comics festival. Radoń played a significant role in the institutionalization and development of the comics community in Poland by developing the festival format, which transformed from a local gathering into an international event.

Radoń's goal was to raise the profile of comics as a form of visual art in Poland and recognize it as a fully-fledged art form. His activities stemmed from the belief that comics are a complex and demanding form of artistic expression, unfairly devalued in the Polish People's Republic as a manifestation of low-value mass culture. In 2013, he established the Łódź Comics Centre – the first Polish institution dedicated to comics.

Radoń contributed to the internationalization of the Polish comics scene by establishing contacts with foreign creators and specialists. In 2006, he organized an exhibition of Polish comics in Brussels. He has presented Belgian comics numerous times at the International Festival of Comics and Games in Łódź, to which he has invited Belgian creators, including Yves Swolfs, Yves Sente, Jul Maroh, Marvano, Daniel Henrotin, Stephen Desberg and others.

=== Centre for Comics and Interactive Narrative ===
Adam Radoń has been the head of the Centre for Comics and Interactive Narrative in Łódź, an organizational unit of EC1 Łódź – City of Culture since 2016. As one of the main initiators of the center's establishment, he played a key role in transforming its long-standing festival and collection activities into a sustainable public institution dedicated to comics and interactive narratives. Under his leadership, the center opened to the public in October 2023 as the first Polish public institution dedicated to both comics and the history of video games. Radoń participated in developing the exhibition concept and acquiring works by artists such as Grzegorz Rosiński and Tadeusz Baranowski.

== Honors and awards ==
- On April 3, 2014, he was awarded the Order of Leopold II for his work promoting Belgian cultural works in Poland and vice versa.
- In 2023, he was awarded the Medal of the 600th Anniversary of Łódź.
