= Jonka, Jonek and Kleks =

Polish comic series

Jonka, Jonek and Kleks are characters from the Polish comic series for children and youth created by Szarlota Pawel. They first appeared in 1974, in the issue 39 (May 14) of the magazine Świat Młodych. Jonka and Jonek are a girl and a boy, while Kleks (literally meaning "inkblot") is a fantastic creature that was born out of an inkwell and drinks ink.

Szarlota Pawel followed the advice of the Polish comic authority Henryk Chmielewski to create a trio of two child and one fantastic characters.

The 50th anniversary collection describes the series thus: " Jonka and Jonek, brought up among the panel houses of Polish People's Republic, break away from their daily routine thanks to Kleks and enter the land of fantasy and dreams." Szarlota Pawel based her plots on books and fairy tales, sayings, and superstitions familiar to Polish children.

The comics were published in the magazine, initially in black and white, and later in color, and since 1980s as standalone albums.

The 1983 album Porwanie księżniczki (The Abduction of the Princess) was translated into Russian as Похищение принцессы in 1989.

In 2006 Zbigniew Dmitroca published an adaptation, under the title Jonka, Jonek i Kleks, as a Level 1 reading in the children's book series Czytam sobie.

== See also ==
- Pan Kleks
