= Świat Młodych =

Polish youth magazine (1949-1993)

Świat Młodych (Youth's World) was a children's magazine in Poland, published from 1949 to 1993. Part of the magazine was dedicated to scouting, but it is most remembered for its last page comics, where many leading Polish comic books artists and titles debuted (ex. Henryk Jerzy Chmielewski with Tytus, Romek i A'Tomek, Szarlota Pawel with Kleks series) or significant parts of them were published there (works of Janusz Christa, Tadeusz Baranowski and Grzegorz Rosiński).

It was one of the two major Polish youth magazines of its era.

The magazine was subject to a documentary in 2012.
