= Przemysław Truściński =

Polish artist

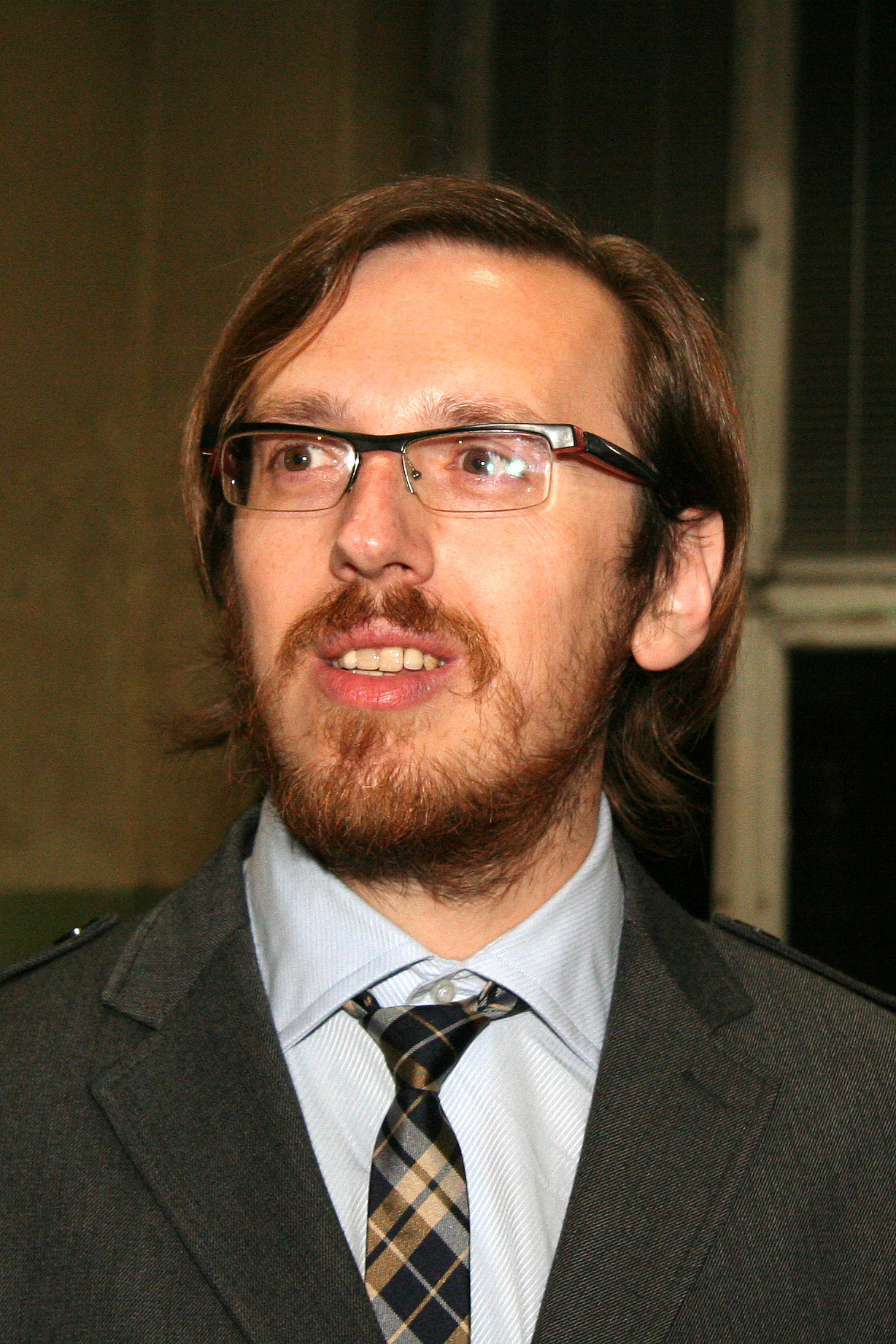
- Przemysław Truściński at 21st International Festival of Comics and Games in Łódź
- Born: 15 December 1970 (age 55) Siedlce
- Area: Artist
- Pseudonym: Trust

Przemysław Truściński (born 15 December 1970) is a Polish comics artist. He graduated from the Academy of Fine Arts In Łódź. He uses the pseudonym Trust.

== Biography ==
Truściński was born in Siedlce, and has worked as a comics artist for Gazeta Wyborcza, Playboy, Machina and Newsweek and as an advertisement artist in Pepsi and Nescafe. He has been awarded several prizes in International Festival of Comics and Games in Łódź. His short stories anthology Trust - historia choroby was published 2003, but numerous other short comics were published in various magazines and anthologies. His work on press comic was gathered in the Komiks W-wa compilation.

Truściński was the original author of concept art for the character Geralt of Rivia in the 2007 video game The Witcher.

Truściński was the artistic director of the "44" comic book anthology devoted to the Warsaw Uprising, published by the Warsaw Rising Museum. He was also the creator of a mural commissioned by the museum. He serves as artistic director of the Warsaw Uprising comic book competition organized annually by the Warsaw Rising Museum.

In 2025, a large monographic exhibition of Truściński's works was held at the Centre for Comics and Interactive Narrative in Łódź, featuring around 500 works, including comics, illustration, and commercial projects. The exhibition was titled "Trust the Process" and emphasized the creative process, combining sketches and drafts with finished works.

== Exhibitions ==
Truściński presented his work at a number of international group exhibitions, as well as monographic shows of his work. Selected exhibitions include:

- 2013 – "Maître de BD Polonais Przemysław TRUST Truściński", Geneva
- 2013 – "Poles ApART: New Polish Comics & Graphic Novels", Central Saint Martins College of Art and Design, London
- 2016 – "Magma. La Bande Dessinée Polonaise contemporaine", Lieu d’Europe, Strasbulles Festival, Strasbourg
- 2017 – "Memoria e narrazione. Il fumetto storico polacco", Naples, COMICON
- 2017 – "Turboprorok", Manggha Museum of Japanese Art and Technology
- 2017 – "Komiksowa Polska", Stockholm International Comics Festival
- 2017 – "Trust in Japan", Uplink, Tokio
- 2018/2019 – "Krzycząc: Polska! Niepodległa 1918", National Museum in Warsaw
- 2022 – "La bande dessinée polonaise au Festival d'Angoulême", Angoulême International Comics Festival
- 2022 – "La bande dessinée polonaise à la Fête de la BD à Bruxelles", Brussels
- 2024 – "El cómic polaco aterriza en Barcelona", Comic Barcelona
- 2025 – "El cómic polaco aterriza en España", Pałac Quintanar, Segowia
- 2025 – "TRUST the Process", Centre for Comics and Interactive Narrative, Łódź

== Honors and awards ==
- In October 2010, Przemysław Truściński was awarded the Medal of Merit for Polish Culture.
- On July 31, 2013, President Bronisław Komorowski awarded Truściński the Silver Cross of Merit for his "contributions to the development of culture and for cultivating the memory of Poland's modern history".
