= Kajko i Kokosz (video game) =

1994 video game

- Amiga cover art for the game.
- Developer: Seven Stars
- Publishers: Mirage, User
- Platforms: Amiga, DOS, Windows
- Release: 1994
- Genre: Point-and-click adventure game

Kajko i Kokosz (literally, Kajko and Kokosz) is a Polish video point-and-click adventure game based on the Kayko and Kokosh comic-book series about the adventures of two Polish warriors, the comedy duo of Kajko and Kokosz. The game was released for Amiga in 1994, for PC MS-DOS in 1995, and for PC Windows in 1998. It was the first of several video-game adaptations of the Kayko and Kokosh comics. The game was described as a commercial success, despite receiving mixed reviews.

== Development ==
The game was developed by the small Polish "Seven Stars" studio, whose staff mostly came from the ASF s.c. studio that had released games mostly for the Atari platform. They secured rights to the popular comic-book series "Kayko and Kokosh", and worked closely with the comic's author, Janusz Christa, who drew a number of illustrations for the game. Intro music was composed by Piotr Bendyk.

The game was first released in 1994 for Amiga, then in 1995 for PC MS-DOS, and in 1998 for PC Windows. The first two editions were called simply Kajko i Kokosz, while the CD edition received a longer title, Kajko i Kokosz w Krainie Borostworów (Kajko i Kokosz in the Land of the Borostwórs). The initial release was not playtested, however, and contained a bug that prevented players from completing the game; as a result, the developers had to recall the first production batch and replace a number of early-sold copies.

The game also received official Czech release under the title Příhody z Galské Země.

Development of the game was plagued by studio financial problems. As a result, the development team lacked a lead animator and musician, and most game content was static and had no musical accompaniment.

== Gameplay ==
The plot of the game is mostly based on the 1987 comic album, Kajko i Kokosz w Krainie Borostworów, augmented with content related to several other books. The gameplay is a standard point-and-click adventure, with player controlling both main characters, who can travel to different locations on the screen and interact with a number of other characters or objects.

== Reception ==
The "Kayko and Kokosh" comic books were very successful among Polish youth. With the last comic published in 1989, with the comic author's involvement in the game design, and with a successful marketing campaign, the game was able to quickly sell over 20,000 copies, which for Poland in 1994 was considered a commercial success, despite the mixed reviews.

Reviewers criticized the Amiga version for an "archaic and unintuitive interface". While the PC version fixed this particular problem, it did not address a number of other matters, such as some annoying and badly designed puzzles, lack of music outside the intro, and simplistic graphics, particularly the limited palette of colors.

Many Polish reviewers appreciated being able to see the popular comic franchise on a computer screen, and commented positively on plot and artwork that was faithful to the original comics, while expressing disappointment with the game's shortcomings, which made it appear less developed than many contemporary games developed in the West. For example, the reviewer for Computer Studio Wydanie Specjalne magazine noted that due to many bugs the game was effectively unplayable until patched. The CD version fixed a number of additional errors, removed some badly received puzzles, and added dubbing; however, the dubbing quality was criticized as unprofessional.

The game's initial release received a score of 77/100 from the Polish video-game magazine Secret Service. The PC version, reviewed a year later, received a much weaker score, 35/100. Another Polish magazine, Gambler, reviewed it more positively, with a score of 70/100. The PC CD version received low scores, with the CD-Action and Imperium Gier portals both rating it at 40/100.

Despite the mixed reviews, the game has since been described as a popular, enduring, and even cult game. Despite a number of other Polish games based on the Kayko and Kokosh comics, as of 2020 it still remains the best known.
