= Kim Jung Gi =

South Korean illustrator (1975–2022)

- 김정기
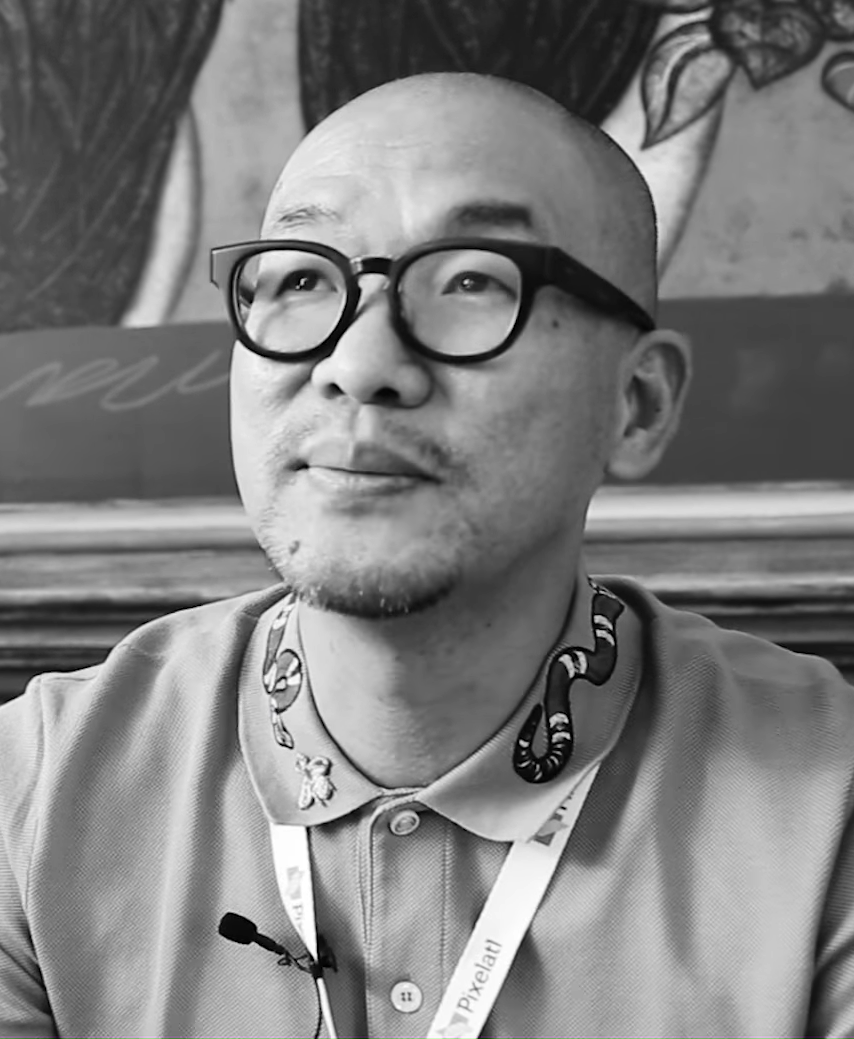
- Kim in 2017
- Born: 7 February 1975; Goyang, South Korea
- Died: 3 October 2022 (aged 47); Paris, France
- Education: Dong-Eui University

Korean name
- Hangul: 김정기
- Hanja: 金政基
- RR: Gim Jeonggi
- MR: Kim Chŏnggi
- Website: kimjunggi.net

Kim Jung Gi (legally Kim Jung Ki; Korean: 김정기; Hanja: 金政基; 7 February 1975 – 3 October 2022) was a South Korean illustrator, cartoonist, and manhwa artist. He was famous for his large, highly detailed illustrations, often drawn only from imagination.

== Biography ==
=== Early life ===
Kim was born in 1975 in Goyang, a suburb of Seoul. He was inspired to begin drawing after viewing an illustration from Dr. Slump, a manga drawn by Akira Toriyama. In school, his teachers often chastised him for not paying attention, as he was busy doodling in his notes.

At the age of 19, he pursued a fine arts education at Dong-Eui University, located in Busan: until he studied here he had not learned the mathematical principles of perspective, something he had previously done by intuition. Kim also served in the Republic of Korea Army; in some interviews, he stated that his time in the army allowed him to build a strong visual memory of a wide array of weapons, vehicles and army situations which he was able to recall in his illustrations.

=== Artistic career ===
When Kim began his career as an artist between the years 2000 and 2001, his works were primarily military-related. According to his official biography, his first published work was Funny Funny, which ran in the Korean magazine Young Jump between 2002 and 2003. Early in his career, Kim felt pressured to draw in the style of Japanese manga, which was popular at the time. However, as tastes changed in South Korea, he managed to become well-known for his personal style of art.

In 2001, he chose "Kim Jung Gi" as his "English name" over his legal name, Kim Jung Ki, because "Gi" was "more visually appealing."

Kim frequently collaborated with other writers and illustrators. His first collaboration was with the writer Seung-Jin Park, for whom he illustrated Tiger the Long Tail. Kim also collaborated more than once with the French comics artist Jean-David Morvan: in 2014 he provided the illustrations for Morvan's SpyGames comics, and in 2016 did the same for McCurry, NYC, 9/11. In 2017, Kim collaborated with the Japanese illustrator Katsuya Terada, one of his own favorite artists. Besides these collaborations, Kim also provided illustrations for many other properties, including variant covers for Civil War II and 10th-anniversary illustrations for League of Legends. He also claimed to have been working on a project with Katsuhiro Otomo.

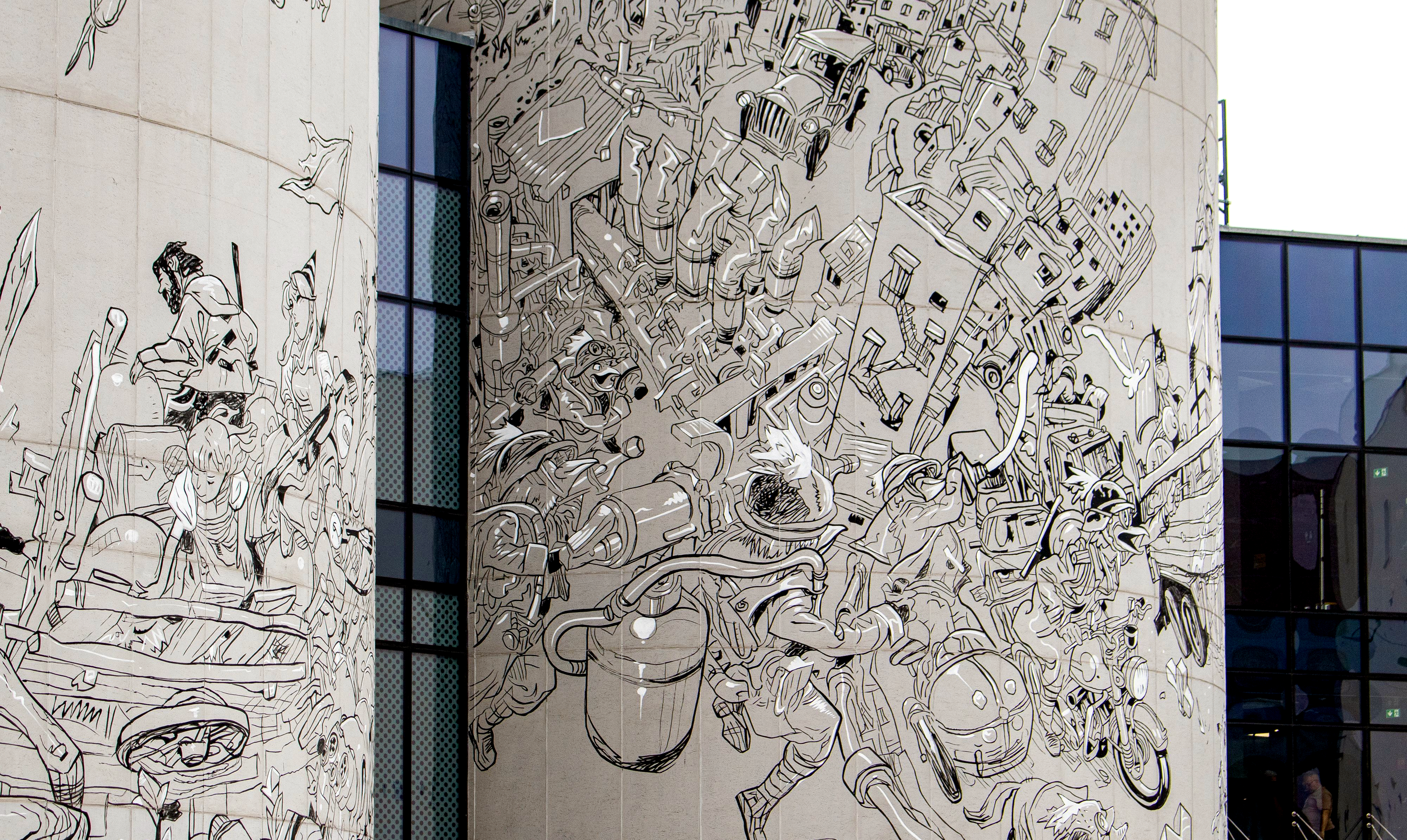
Mural by Kim Jung Gi on the facade of the Centre for Comics and Interactive Narrative in Łódź

Kim also taught art at universities and private schools. He worked for the art studio SuperAni and taught at the AniChanga Art School, which he co-founded with Kim Hyun-jin. He also taught at and provided video content for the Kazone Art Academy, a private secondary art school located in Los Angeles.

In 2021, Kim designed a mural for the newly established Centre for Comics and Interactive Narrative in Łódź. His complex design was transferred onto the facades of the building's cooling towers. The artist designed an elaborate, monochromatic composition – a black-and-white drawing telling a story which visitors can follow, starting at the entrance to the building. The mural is a permanent feature of the museum facade. In 2022, the artist was also a guest at the International Festival of Comics and Games in Łódź.

Kim died in Paris of a heart attack on October 3rd 2022, after experiencing chest pains. He was diabetic.

== Technique ==
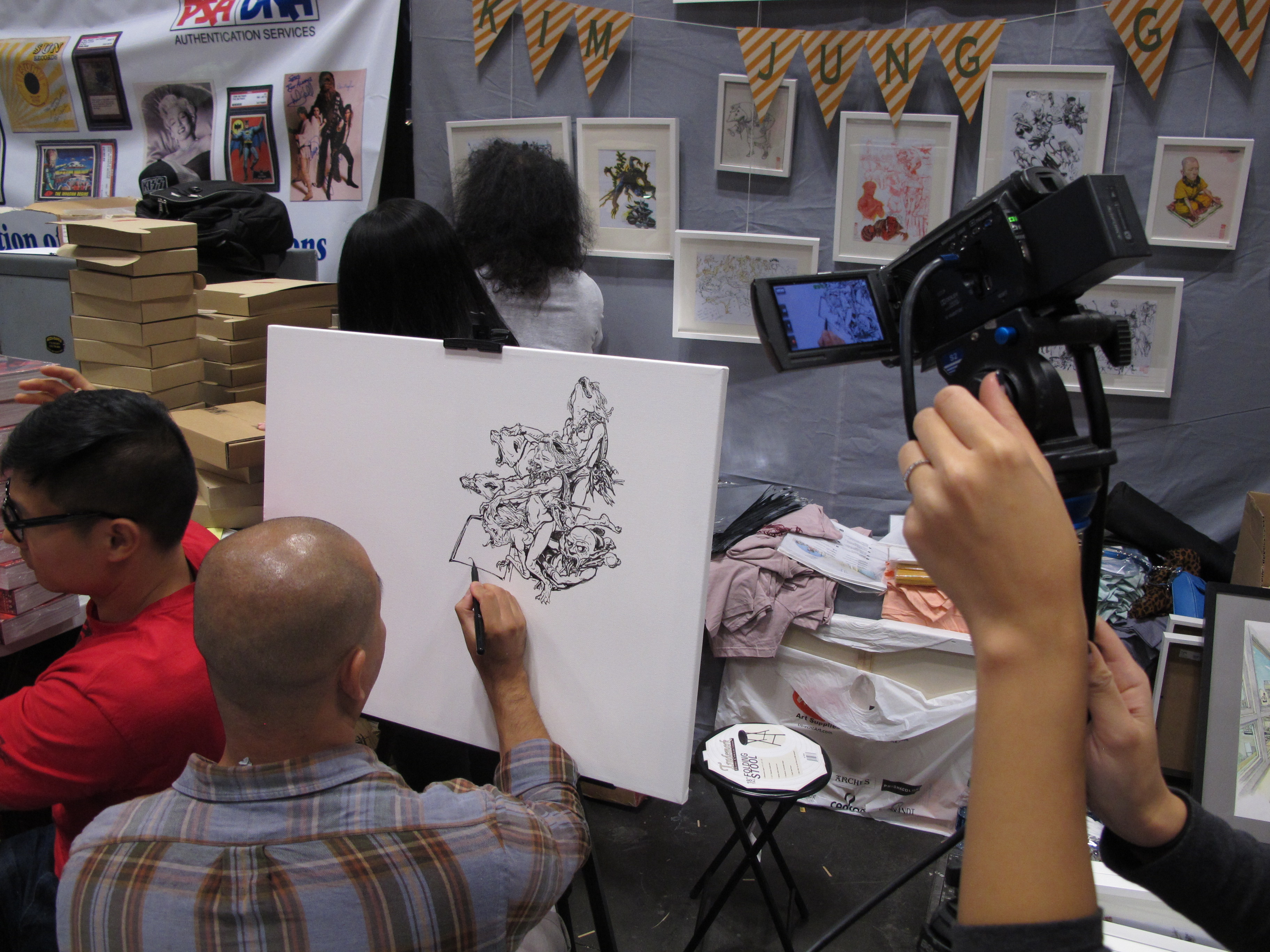
Kim in the middle of producing a drawing, 2014

Kim was famous for his detailed illustrations, ink and brush artistic style, and skill at drawing from memory. He could complete his drawings entirely from his imagination, without the use of sketches, visual references, or other preparatory aids, and often used exotic forms of perspective, such as curvilinear perspective.

Kim drew in a variety of sizes, but he was especially well known for his large drawings. He drew these pictures directly on paper without the use of sketching or other preparation, improvising them as he went. From 2014, he also publicly exhibited his process at special events, where he would draw over a large white canvas. In 2015, he made an attempt to hold the Guinness world record for the longest drawing by an individual in "fisheye perspective."

Kim primarily drew in ink, and used a variety of pens including fineliners, brush pens, and ballpoint pens. Before starting a drawing he would imagine various compositions in his mind's eye, and relate the subjects to simple shapes like boxes and grids. If there were not any obvious indicators of depth in a subject, he would use smaller details like clothing folds to establish it. When he was unable to draw during his military service, Kim claimed that he would observe the details of things around him or draw them in his mind.

When asked, Kim claimed that his skill came from his habit of constantly drawing, rather than his choice of pen; he also denied claims that he had a photographic memory or was an autistic savant.

== Museum ==
On 17 October 2023, a museum dedicated to Kim was opened in Paju, South Korea. The artist left behind more than 6,000 works.

- 2023/24: Kim Jung Gi Live (17 October 2023 – 17 April 2024)
- 2024/25: Filling and Emptiness (1 May 2024 – 1 February 2025)

== Publications ==
The following is an incomplete list of works Kim has authored or contributed to:

=== Solo works ===
- Sketch Collection 2007. SuperAni. 2007. ISBN 9788995973202.
- Sketch Collection 2011. SuperAni. 2011. ISBN 9788995973219.
- Sketch Collection 2013. SuperAni. 2013. ISBN 9788995973226.
- Omphalos. SuperAni. 2015. ISBN 9788995973240.
- Sketch Collection 2018. SuperAni. 2018. ISBN 9791189193034.
- Sketch Collection 2022. SuperAni. 2022. ISBN 9782382890455.

=== Collaborative works ===
- Seung-Jin Park (2008–2010). Tiger the Long Tail. C&C Revolution.
- Jean-David Morvan (2014). SpyGames. Glénat Editions. ISBN 9782723487023.
- Katsuya Terada (2015). Illustration Book. SuperAni. ISBN 9788995973295.
- Jean-David Morvan (2016). McCurry, NYC, 9/11. Dupuis, Magnum Photos, Caurette. ISBN 9791096315017.
- Katsuya Terada (2017). Katsuya Terada & Kim Jung Gi Illustration Collection (in Japanese). Genkosha. ISBN 9784768307908.
- Hardcover. Spiridon Giannakis, Caurette. 2019. ISBN 9791096315390.
- Hardcover2. Spiridon Giannakis, Caurette. 2021. ISBN 9791096315758.
- Hardcover3. Spiridon Giannakis, Caurette. 2022. ISBN 9782382890097.

=== Publications featuring illustrations by Kim ===
- Bernard Werber (2010). Paradise (in Korean). (illustrations)
- Bernard Werber (2013). Third Humanity (in Korean). (illustrations)
- Éric Hérenguel (2016). Kiliwatch. Caurette. ISBN 9791096315024. (cover artwork)
- Civil War II. Marvel Comics. 2016. (variant covers)
- Robert Kirkman; Chris Samnee (2022). Fire Power. Image Comics. (cover artwork)
