= Children's comics =

Comics genre

Children's comics are comics intended primarily for children.

== Contents ==
Unlike adult comics, children's comics generally don't contain material that could be considered thematically inappropriate for children, including vulgarity, morally questionable actions, disturbing imagery, and sexually explicit material. In some places, this can be enforced through legal or industry bodies, such as the Comics Code Authority in the second half of the 20th century in the United States.

Charles Hatfield claims that one of the common characteristics of children's comics is "cuteness".

Traditionally, comics were often intended for children, and are still often considered less "serious" than books, but this perception, and their target audience, has been gradually shifting, leading to the growing popularity of the adult comics.

== Audience ==
The focus on children makes them part of the children's literature, and distinguishes them from general audience comics, known as adult comics. In between those two, the term young adult comics (also adolescent comics) is sometimes used. Those terms are somewhat arbitrary, with Roger Sabin defining children's comics as those for readers aged 16 or less, and within that group distinguishing nursery comics for those aged 8 or below, and adolescent comics for the group of 12–16 years old). Some comics have also been described as "all ages" (ex. Little Lit).

== By country ==
=== United States ===
Among the most popular children's comics in the United States are Disney's comics such as Mickey Mouse and Donald Duck, which have also been widely translated around the world.

=== Poland ===
In Poland, classic children's comics include titles such as Pan Kleks, Tytus, Romek i A'Tomek and Kajko i Kokosz .
