= Kajko and Kokosz =

Polish comic book series by Janusz Christa

Kayko and Kokosh
- Cover of The Golden Chalice Part 3. From left to right: Mirmił, Lubawa, Kajko, Kokosz.
- Original title: Kajko i Kokosz
- Country: Poland (origin)
- Language: Polish (original)
- Genre: Comedy; Satire
- Published: 1972
- Published in English: 2019

Kajko and Kokosz or Kayko and Kokosh (Polish: Kajko i Kokosz) is a Polish comic book series by Janusz Christa that debuted in Poland in 1972 and was published primarily until 1992. Mixing history and fantasy tropes it is centered on light-hearted and often comedic adventures of two Slavic warriors named Kajko and Kokosz, loosely resembling both Asterix and Obelix, as well as two personalities from Christa's earlier series on Kajtek i Koko (set in the contemporary and science-fiction background). The series consists of 20 comic albums, as well as a number of shorter stories published in various magazines. In 2006, a short 3D animated movie was made.

Since 2016 two books by new authors have been published, containing collections of short stories focusing mainly on secondary characters from Kajko and Kokosz series (Breakbone, Miluś, Knavenknights etc.). The first long Kajko and Kokosz story in almost 30 years "Królewska Konna" ("The Royal Mounties") was released in spring 2019 written by Maciej Kur (who did most of the previous short stories) and drawn by Sławomir Kiełbus, with colors by Piotr Bednarczyk. The plot was based on an unused idea by Christa himself, taken from his notes. The book met with massive positive reactions from the fans.

== Plot ==
Main characters in the series include castellan Mirmił, hypochondriac ruler of the village of Mirmiłowo, where Kajko and Kokosz serve as warriors; Lubawa, dominating wife of Mirmił; small dragon Miluś; benevolent witch Jaga; her husband, the good robber Breakbone (Łamignat) and the antagonists of the series: military knight order of Knaveknights (Zbójcerze), based on the Teutonic Knights, led by Hegemon, with his second in command, Hitler-like Corporal and Schweik-like Loser (Oferma). The stories are written in a tongue-in-cheek manner and contain light satirical elements, usually puns concerning the reality of living in Communist-ruled Poland with characters sometimes mentioning labour unions, bureaucracy, commodity shortages, and similar themes.

=== The characters ===
- Kayko (Kajko) – A small but clever, brave and very resourceful warrior. He has a kind nature and always stands for justice. He lives with his best friend Kokosz.
- Kokosh (Kokosz) – Best friend of Kajko. Almost the complete opposite of Kajko, he is large, fat and bald, and usually is shown to represent the worst habits – he always goes with his gut, appears to be self-centered and sometimes either aggressive or cowardly. He is however incredibly strong. In the first book, Kokosz is shown to believe that he is as strong as his shadow is long (depending on the time at that moment).
- Mirmił – The castellan of Mirmiłowo, the village where Kajko and Kokosz live. He is a small man with a large red moustache. While good hearted, he occasionally appears to be pompous and melancholic – as a running gag, Mirmił often openly considers committing suicide whenever a problem appears to be unsolvable.
- Lubawa – Mirmił's large and somehow more assertive wife. She often appears to be in control of her husband.
- Jaga (known as Zielacha in Złoty puchar) — a good witch and also Kokosz's aunt, originally an ugly old hag who makes herself young-looking again through magic. Her name is a reference to Baba Jaga a witch from Polish fairy tales and folklore. She has a talking pet raven named "Gdaś".
- Łamignat (Breakbone) – Jaga's husband. As a good natured and softhearted bandit who robs the rich and gives to the poor, some may believe this is a reference to Robin Hood, whereas Łamignat is in fact a parody of Robin Hood's Polish counterpart named Juraj Jánošík. He is incredibly strong, much stronger than Kokosz, and has a gigantic club which only he can lift. Łamignat's strength sometimes drives Kokosz furious with envy, yet they are still friends. Due to Łamignat's shy nature, Jaga encourages him by giving him a flute and telling him it will make Łamignat stronger whenever he plays it (the flute is in fact normal but gives a placebo effect to Łamignat, making him more confident). Łamignat's catch-phrase is "Lelum Polelum".
- Miluś – A dragon that Kajko and Kokosz found (at first as an egg) and adopted in the book "Zamach na Milusia". Miluś appears to be afraid of small animals (mice for example) and only eats vegetables. In his second appearance in "Skarby Mirmiła" Miluś grew bigger and developed wings – he however could only fly if he could start and land on water – and in "Cudowny lek" Miluś met a female dragon and left Kajko and Kokosz to live in the land of dragons (which was actually a good thing, as there were many dragon hunters attempting to hunt him down). After that, Miluś appeared in some short stories (all collected in a special comic book "Urodziny Milusia") – all set before the events in "Cudowny lek".
- Woj Wit (Wit the Warrior) – Kajko and Kokosz first meet Wit on their adventures in the second book "Szranki i konkury" and during their adventures in "Na wczasach". After the second one, however, Wit ends up living in Mirmiłowo and did not get to play an important part (apart from some background cameo appearances) until the very last book "Mirmił w Opałach". In the first book Wit is a romantic, adventure-seeking knight who only spoke in rhyme (he however lost the tendency to do so in the middle of the story as he got broken hearted). In his second appearance in "Na wczasach" Wit is shown as more of a Don Quixote figure, always looking for a challenge to a duel and often singing romantic songs (unlike his first appearance). In his third main appearance Wit was back to talking in rhyme and had become interested in science which led him to inventing exploding powder causing much more mayhem in the village. In his first two appearances Wit has a clever horse who was always trying to keep his master out of trouble.
- The Knaveknights (Zbójcerze) – a group of evil knights wanting to take over Mirmiłowo loosely based on the Teutonic Knights. They are led by a powerful warrior Cruel Hegemon who is the main villain of the series. His right-hand man, a Hitler-like Kapral (Corporal) often appears to attempt to rebel. One more notable "Zbójcerz" is Oferma (Loser) who appears to be based on Schweik and while being the "idiot of the group" is often chosen for special missions.

== Albums in the series ==
By Janusz Christa:

- Złoty puchar ("The Golden Chalice") (3 parts) - also known as Złote prosię ("The Golden Pig").
- Szranki i konkury (3 parts) ("The Tournaments")
- Woje Mirmiła (3 parts) ("Mirmił's Warriors"); the 2nd part of a 2-part edition originally published as Rozprawa z Dajmiechem.
- Szkoła latania ("Flying School"); translated to Silesian as Szkoła furganio, as Flying School in English, and as Kajko Og Kokosh: Flyverskolen in Danish.
- Wielki turniej ("The Great Tournament"); translated to Goral dialect as Ogromniasto gońba, into English as "The Big Tournament" and into Ukraine as "Великий турнір".
- Na wczasach ("On Holidays"); translated to Kashubian as Na latowisku, in French as Kaïko et Kokoche en vacances, and as Kajko Og Kokosh: Vikingerne in Danish.
- Zamach na Milusia ("The Attempt on Miluś"); translated as Kajko Og Kokosz: Dragen Putte to Danish.
- Wielki turniej ("The Great Tournament");
- Skarby Mirmiła ("The Treasures of Mirmił) translated into Esperanto as "Kajko kaj Kokoŝo – Trezoroj de Mirmilo".
- Cudowny lek ("The Miraculous Cure")
- Festiwal czarownic ("The Witch Festival") translated to Goral dialect as "Posiady guślorek".
- Dzień Śmiechały ("The Day of Laughter")
- W krainie borostworów ("The Land of Forestlings")
- Mirmił w opałach ("Mirmił in Trouble")
- Urodziny Milusia ("The Birthday of Miluś") - this book is a set of short stories some set before the events in "Cudowny lek".

By other authors since:

- Obłęd Hegemona ("Insanity of Hegemon") - short stories.
- Łamignat Straszliwy ("Breakbone the Terrible") - short stories.
- Królewska Konna ("The Royal Mounties")
- Zaćmienie o zmierzchu ("The Twilight Eclipse")
- Rozróby i romanse ("Brawls and romances") - short stories.
- Powrót Milusia ("Return of Miluś")
- Oferma Wielki ("Oferma Th Great") - short stories.

== Reception ==
The series was largely popular in Poland and has been reprinted several times. It was also the basis of several computer games, with the first one published in 1994. It's considered one of the classic Polish children's comics.

In the 2010s several albums were translated into other languages including Kashubian and Silesian, as well as a dialect used by highlanders from Podhale, as well as an English edition of two of the albums, Flying School and The big Tournament, translated by Michael Kandel. and French translation by Pascale Peeters in 2018.

=== Asterix controversy ===
For years fans accused the series of plagiarism, referencing its similarities to the series Asterix and vice versa. The titles share a similar art style, character designs and archetypes, and even employ similar jokes. While the main characters had debuted in Kajtek and Koko years before Asterix's first publication, the characters' incarnations as Slavic warriors Kajko and Kokosz post-dated Asterix's success (Kajtek and Koko plotline featured characters as modern-day sailors or space explorers). For years Christa maintained that the similarities were a coincidence, while Albert Uderzo (the co-creator of Asterix) never addressed the matter. Some have described as significant the fact that the last "Kajko and Kokosz" book was published the same year as the first Polish translation of an Asterix book appeared.

== Adaptations ==
=== Video games ===
The first version of the debut title (Kajko i Kokosz) appeared on Amiga computers; a short time later a PC version was released, published under the title Kajko i Kokosz w krainie borostworów. The author of the Kajko and Kokosz comics, Janusz Christa, took part in the creation of the first game, creating storyboards. In mid-2000s, two simple platform games (Szkoła Latania and Cudowny Lek) were published, aimed at kids, and in 2012, a new adventure game was released, composed of three stand-alone titles (Rozprawa z Hodonem, Podstęp Kaprala, and Mirmiłowo Wielkie) later combined into a complete edition (Twierdza Czarnoksiężnika).

The following video games have been published:

- Kajko i Kokosz w Krainie Borostworów (Amiga 1994, PC DOS 1995, PC Windows 1998)
- Kajko i Kokosz: Szkoła Latania (2005)
- Kajko i Kokosz 2: Cudowny Lek (2006)
- Kajko i Kokosz: Rozprawa z Hodonem (2012)
- Kajko i Kokosz: Podstęp Kaprala (2012)
- Kajko i Kokosz: Mirmiłowo Wielkie (2012)
- Kajko i Kokosz: Twierdza Czarnoksiężnika (2012)

In 2019 the bandit Breakbone was added to the indie Go All Out video game.

=== Animated series ===
An animated series based on the comics was released on December 1, 2021, but it premiered on February 28 in selected territories ahead of its global debut.
