= Henryk Chmielewski (comics) =

Polish comic book artist and journalist (1923–2021)

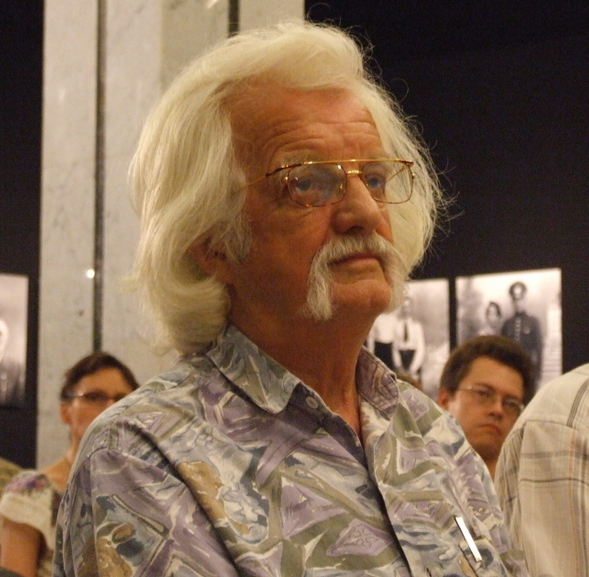
- Chmielewski in 2007
- Born: Henryk Jerzy Chmielewski; 7 June 1923 Warsaw, Poland
- Died: 22 January 2021 (aged 97) Warsaw, Poland
- Pseudonym: Papcio Chmiel
- Notable works: Tytus, Romek i A'Tomek series

Henryk Jerzy Chmielewski (7 June 1923 – 22 January 2021), also known under his pseudonym Papcio Chmiel, was a Polish comic book artist and journalist.

During World War II, Chmielewski served in the Home Army and took part in the Warsaw Uprising. After the war, he started working as a graphic artist in the Świat Młodych magazine, where he also published comics. Since the debut of his first Tytus, Romek i A'Tomek comic book in 1966, he focused his career almost entirely on this series, telling the story of Tytus de Zoo, an anthropomorphic, talking chimpanzee who wants to become a human. The last, thirty first book of the main series was published in 2008, but Chmielewski continued to create other works, such as artbooks, with his characters.

Chmielewski's comics are known for the use of absurdist humour, puns and word plays. Aimed at children and teenagers, with the goal of being both entertaining and educational, his works often explore history (especially history of Poland), science, art or have the characters trying different professions.

== Early life and World War II ==
Henryk Chmielewski was born on 7 June 1923 in Warsaw. During World War II, he was a member of the 7th Infantry Regiment of the Home Army "Garłuch" (Polish: 7. pułk piechoty Armii Krajowej "Garłuch"). He took part in the Warsaw Uprising.

=== Private life ===
In 1949, he married Anna née Śliwińska. Together, they had daughter Monika (born 1951) and son Artur Bartłomiej (born 1957). They divorced in 1974. Chmielewski's son Artur works at JPL.

Chmielewski died on the night of 22 January 2021.

== Career in Świat Przygód and Świat Młodych ==
On 1 September 1947, Chmielewski started working as a graphic artist in the Świat Przygód (The World of Adventures), a magazine aimed at children and teenagers. The magazine was often publishing Western comic strips and parts of comic books translated to Polish, taken from foreign newspapers without asking for licensing copyright. One of the comics published in such manner was the American King of the Royal Mounted, copied from a Swedish magazine. Once Świat Przygód couldn't obtain the newest issue of this newspaper, Chmielewski was asked to draw his own episodes of King's adventures, so the magazine could avoid abruptly ending the series without explanation. Six such episodes were created, which Chmielewski counts as his debut as an comics author in his autobiography.

When Chmielewski was answering letters to the editor sent to his newspaper, he would write under the name Dziadzio Chmiel (Grandpa Hops, with the word chmiel taken from his surname). Chmielewski believed children would be more willing to write letters to a "grandpa", than a 25-year-old he really was.

In January 1949, Świat Przygód was merged with Na Tropie, a scouting magazine, to form Świat Młodych (The World of Youth). At the same time, the magazine ceased publishing comics, since Poland was a Stalinist socialist country at that time and comics were viewed as an American form of art.

Between 1950 and 1956, he studied at the Academy of Fine Arts in Warsaw. After ending his studies in 1956, Chmielewski was thinking about becoming a poster artist, since publishing comics was still not possible. However, in the same year, following De-Stalinization in the Eastern Bloc and Gomułka's thaw in Poland itself, he decided to try drawing comics once again. Chmielewski created ten single-page episodes of Romek i A'Tomek (Romek and A'Tomek, Romek and Tomek being pet forms of the names Roman and Tomasz), a black-and-white comic telling the story of two boys, the title characters, who accidentally fly into space in a rocket while visiting an "astronautics exhibition". During the flight, the boys discover a talking space monkey called Tytus used for experiments. At that time, the characters' personalities were not yet developed, and the idea of humanizing Tytus as the main topic was not yet born.

The comic was not published immediately, as the Świat Młodych editor in chief was initially sceptical about it, fearing – despite the thaw – that publishing a comic might cause troubles with the Main Office of Control of Press, Publications and Shows (Polish: Główny Urząd Kontroli Prasy, Publikacji i Widowisk), which had the right to censor newspapers. Only after the Soviet Union launched the Sputnik 1 satellite on 4 October 1957, Świat Młodych decided to start publishing Romek i A'Tomek, because of its space-based storyline. The first episode debuted on the front cover of 22 October issue, although it was referred to as a "picture story" (Polish: historyjka obrazkowa) rather than a comic. The characters became popular and Chmielewski started creating subsequent episodes (no longer set in space), under the title Tytus, Romek i A'Tomek. In 1964, he also launched the Klub Tytusa (Tytus Club) in Świat Młodych, with humorous articles presented as written by the chimpanzee himself.

== Tytus, Romek i A'Tomek ==
In early 1965, after nine years of Tytus... as a newspaper comic in episodes, Wydawnictwo Harcerskie's (Polish: Scouting Publishing) director Janusz Maruszewski proposed to create a comic book with the characters. Since the publisher was only allowed to release scouting-related works, Chmielewski was given very specific instructions about the story: Romek and A'Tomek were planned to be members of the Polish Scouting and Guiding Association, who check whether Tytus might also become a scout. During the story, the main characters would also try to find their first jobs and earn money to visit a scout camp, learn about conserving historical monuments and fight with superstitions. The publishers ordered Chmielewski to create a comic which would give "education through entertainment and entertainment through education".

After six months of drawing and getting the approval of the Main Office of Control of Press, Tytus harcerzem (Polish: Tytus the Scout) debuted in 1966 in 30,000 copies, which were all sold within a week.

Although the comics were initially not planned to be a series, Chmielewski was asked to create a second book, this time dealing with traffic laws. Tytus otrzymuje prawko jazdy (Tytus gets a Driving License) debuted in 1967, in 50,000 copies, which were also sold-out very quickly. Following the success, Wydawnictwo Harcerskie ordered another three books: Tytus kosmonautą (Tytus the Cosmonaut, released in 1968), Tytus żołnierzem (Tytus the Soldier, 1969) and Podróż do ćwierć koła świata (Journey around a Quarter of the World, 1970).

In his later years, Chmielewski created "albums" (or artbooks) with his characters. Unlike comics, they have no plot, being composed of separate satirical pictures. The first album, featuring Tytus and his friends as soldiers during the Battle of Warsaw, was published in 2010.

=== Common themes ===
The main topic of the series is the "humanization" (Polish: uczłowieczenie) of Tytus, that is, turning his intellect into that of a human being. This theme often serves as a pretence for including educational elements in the story. Chmielewski's comics are known for the usage of word plays, such as puns and neologisms. One example is the name of his character A'Tomek, which is a portmanteau of the word atom and Tomek (Polish pet form of the name Tomasz).

=== Publishers' influence ===
Before the fall of Communism in Poland in 1989, the main topics and sometimes even specific adventures of the comics were not chosen by Chmielewski himself, but rather by his publishers. He was especially not fond of the theme of the second book, where the protagonists learn about rules of the road. While his publisher wanted a comic that would be mainly educational, Chmielewski wanted to focus on humorous situations. In a compromise solution, he created a board game about traffic laws, which was included in the middle of the book.

After Chmielewski created the fourth book, Tytus the Soldier, his publishers thought that drawing army vehicles in a cartoon way might be perceived as ridicule by the People's Army of Poland, and hired another artist to draw realistic pictures of the vehicles and weaponry used by the Army. They were included, along with technical specifications, in the margins of the comic book.

While Chmielewski planned to portray a positive view of the United States in Journey Around a Quarter of the World, such as his characters becoming stuntmen in Hollywood, the publishers wanted to stress the existence of racism. They also proposed to include an episode where Tytus would meet partisans in fighting in the Angolan War of Independence. Chmielewski disagreed, saying that such issues are too serious for a humorous comic book. Nonetheless, in the final version of the book, the main characters witness a private-owned "whites only" beach in Miami.

== Awards ==
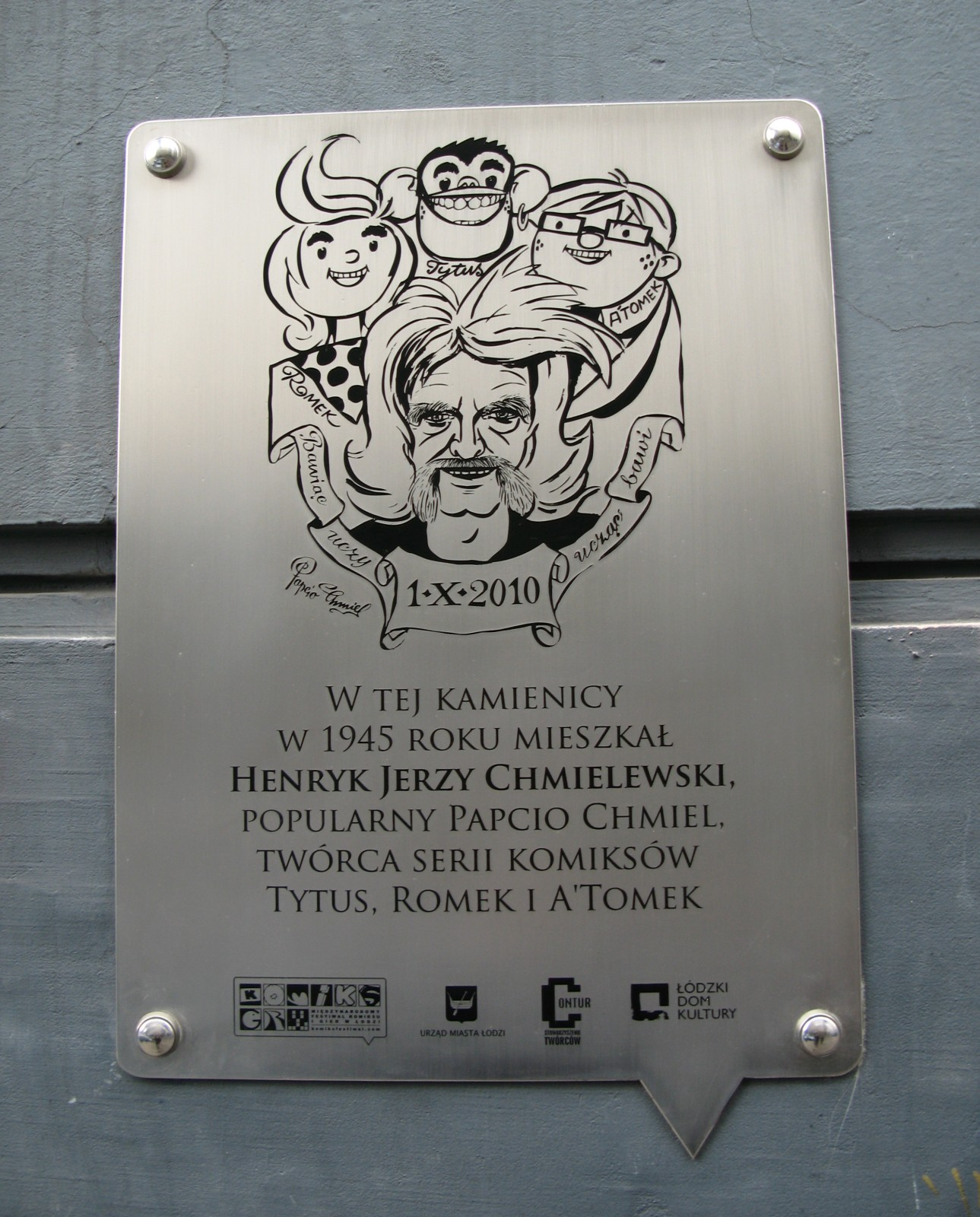
A commemorative plaque on a house in Łódź where Chmielewski lived in 1945

For his involvement in World War II, especially the Warsaw Uprising, Chmielewski was awarded the Warsaw Cross of the Uprising in 1983, and the Commander's Cross of the Order of Polonia Restituta in 2006.

For his artistic career, Chmielewski was awarded the Gloria Artis Medal for Merit for Culture, Gold Class (in 2007), the highest Polish order given for artistic deeds (with Gold Medal being its highest class). On the same day, two other comic book creators, Tadeusz Baranowski and Janusz Christa were also awarded, although with Silver Medals. It was the first time that comic book artists have received Gloria Artis.

In 2019, Chmielewski was awarded the Medal of Century of Regained Independence by the President of Poland. He was also a Knight of the Order of the Smile.
