= Tytus, Romek i A'Tomek =

Polish comic series

"Tytus becomes a Scout" volume I

"Tytus on the expedition to the Nonsense Islands" volume XIII

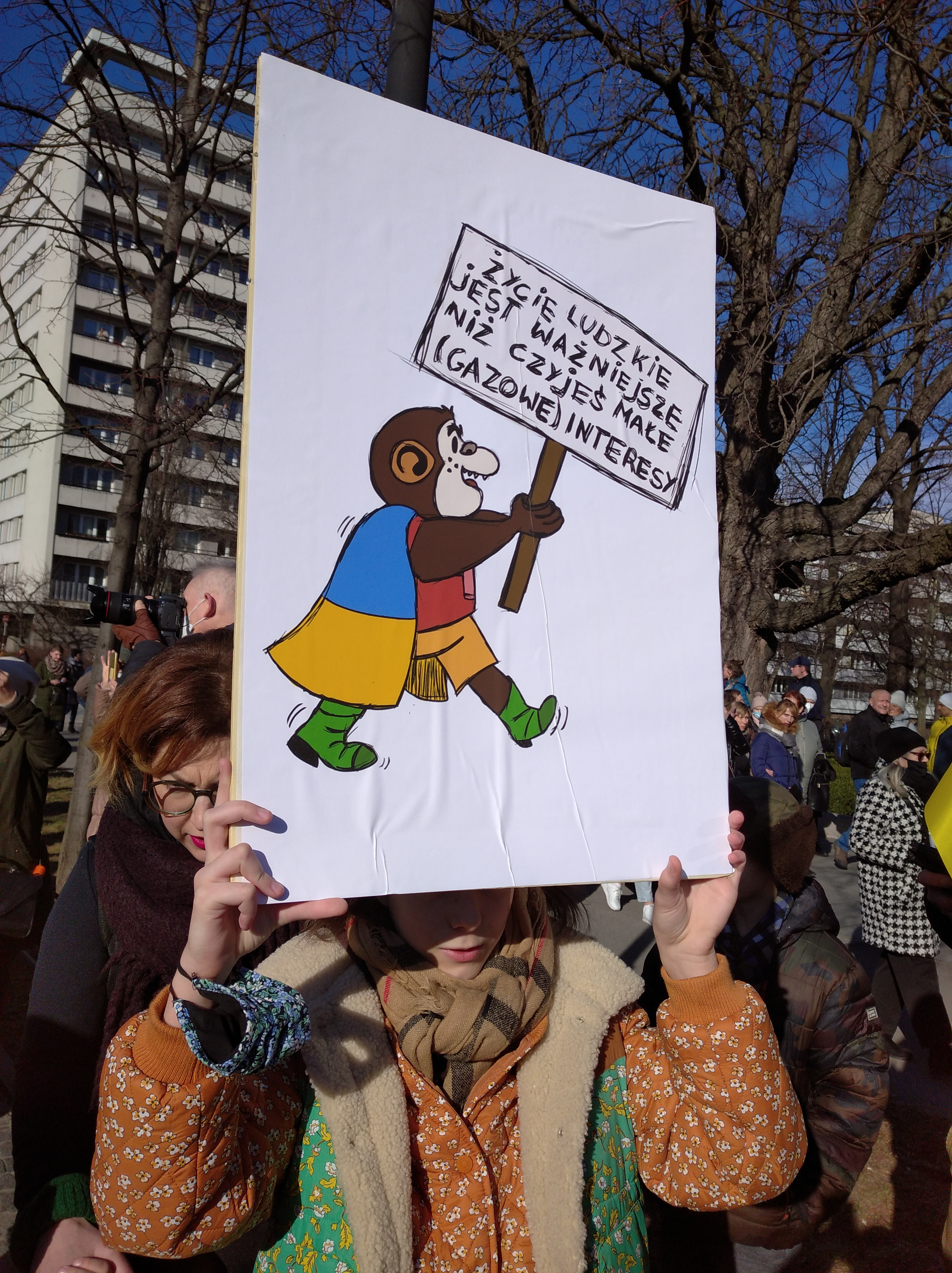
Tytus de Zoo on a 2022 placard during a Polish demonstration in support of Ukraine, following the Russian invasion of Ukraine that year.

Tytus, Romek i A'Tomek (eng. Tytus, Romek, and A'Tomek) is the longest-published and one of the most popular Polish comic books, created by Henryk Jerzy Chmielewski (aka Papcio Chmiel) in 1957 and concluded in 2009. It centers on Romek and A'Tomek, two Boy Scouts, and Tytus de Zoo, a chimpanzee with the ability of human speech. It is considered one of the classic Polish children's comics and one of the most popular Polish comic books.

== History ==
The strip debuted in Polish magazine Świat Młodych in 1957, and the first book was published in 1966. In 2006 the series was described as the longest-running Polish comic book series.

Henryk Jerzy Chmielewski announced in May 2009 that the main Tytus, Romek i A'Tomek series would no longer be published. Instead, special thematic albums with new adventures were still published periodically until the author's death in 2021. By 2017, the series consisted of 31 volumes and six special books, as well as a number of episodic short strips and media tie-ins, some of which were collected into dedicated books.

== Contents ==
The story centers on Romek and A'Tomek, two Boy Scouts, and Tytus de Zoo, a chimpanzee with the ability of human speech. The trio is aided by two adults, Professor T. Alent - a friendly mad scientist, and personification of Chmielewski himself, comic book author Papcio Chmiel. The boys participate in various adventures, some embedded in the realities of Poland at that time, others completely unrealistic. As scouts, they go to camps, take part in joint ventures organized by the Polish Scouting Association, and even participate in military exercises; at other times they travel through mysterious, existing or non-existent lands, sometimes funny and ridiculous to the point of absurdity; often they travel in time and witness important events.

Many adventures in Tytus, Romek i A'Tomek have speculative or science fiction elements, some as outright parodies of the established genre. The subjects and background themes in all of the books reflect the culture and atmosphere of the time they were drawn and printed. For instance, the early books are dominated by Scouting-related themes and community service, while the 1990s-era books subtly point out the social, economic and cultural changes that were occurring in Poland at that time. The Polish dialogue often features a mix of youth slang, slang from pre-World War II Poland, and words from other European languages, as well as Chmielewski's own humorous neologisms, which contain political themes and satire.

The books are educational, but won its intended young audience because they are also full of adventure, humor, mystery and even subversive anarchism. This, together with the main character, a monkey that tries to become human, made them popular among kids and teenagers. The popularity of the series was also helped by the artistic design - they were very colorful, and more vibrant than the black and white TV or most of the other media Polish children were exposed in the early second half of the 20th century. Over the years, the series became less rigid, as Chmielewski was able to go beyond a number of constraints imposed on him by the publisher.

The books have been described as having a lasting popularity exceeding that of other Polish comics. One of the reasons for that is that while Chmielewski had to follow some dictates of propaganda and censorship, and include some, mostly educational, themes, he was able to incorporate the guidelines in a way that was subtle and not overbearing. Some of the humor in the series can be interpreted as a veiled critique of the community authorities. Nonetheless, some elements of propaganda, such as criticisms of capitalism and the United States, can be found in early books.

== Reception ==
It is considered one of the classic Polish children's comics and one of the most popular Polish comic book series. In 1979, 22 years into its run, it was described as one of the most important achievements of Polish comics.

== Characters ==
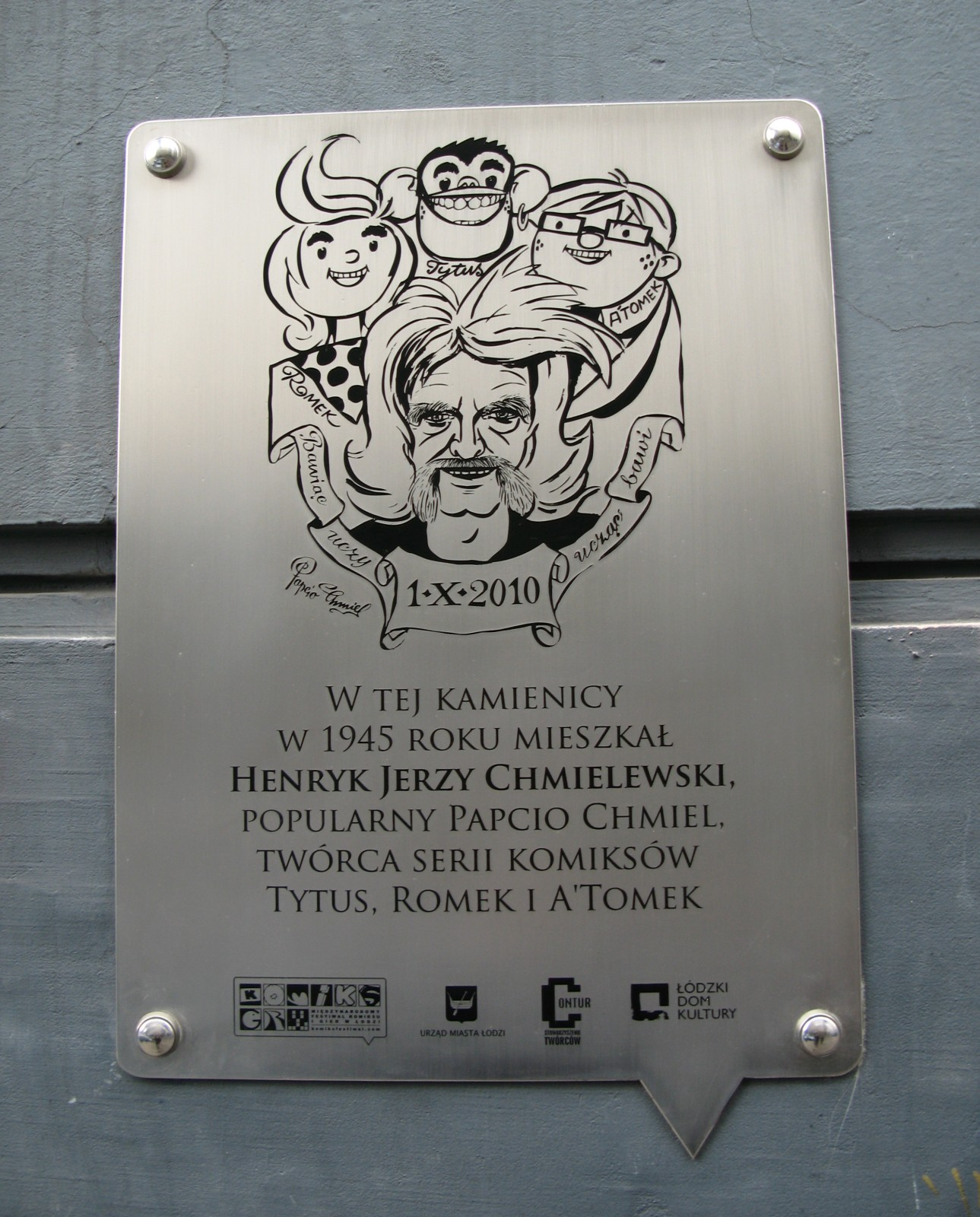
A plaque on the house in Łódź that Chmielewski lived in, showing his cartoon face (Papcio Chmiel) surrounded by Tytus (in the center), Romek (left) and A'Tomek (right).

Main:

- Tytus de Zoo – a chimpanzee and the main character of the series. Tytus speaks and thinks like a human being and even attends public school together with his two human friends. However, his animal heritage clearly shines through: he is presented as wanting to attain humanity, but usually falls short during their hilarious adventures. In the first story drawn by Chmielewski for the Świat Młodych magazine, Romek and A’Tomek find Tytus in a rocket, which at the time was part of the communist anti-American propaganda, as Tytus tells them he was abused by a foreign scientist. In the book version, however, Tytus came to life from a blot of ink the creator Papcio Chmiel accidentally spilled on the floor (this unusual origin fits the slightly surrealistic nature of the books). Tytus, however, many times mentions (and has visited) his "homeland" Trapezfik, which is a reference to Tytus' love for physical activity and Polish wordplay on the words "trapeze" and "tumble", along with African country names like Mozambik)).
- Romek – a tall, blond and slim Boy Scout. He often teases Tytus with ever-more creative and insulting comments and is pessimistic about Tytus' attempts to gain knowledge and attain humanity.
- A'Tomek – the leader of the trio. A short, overweight boy in glasses. He is very intelligent, mature, and often the most honorable and well-mannered one. A'Tomek is the leader of the group and the source of most ideas on how to approach the process of "humanizing" Tytus. His name is Polish wordplay, suggesting atomic energy and in fact is nicknamed "A'tom" for short by others (there is a Polish name Tomek, a diminutive form of Tomasz (Thomas)).
- Professor T. Alent – a helpful if mad scientist and one of few recurring characters in the series beside the main trio. He designs and builds various machines, often flying ones that help the boys during their adventures. Also, he has many lab mice, which are often seen playing in his hair. His name is a wordplay, suggesting talent.
- Papcio Chmiel – the creator of the series often appeared in the books portraying himself as a fatherly figure to the boys and Tytus and is often shown to have God-like powers; he has been shown making paintings come to life or appearing out of nowhere in the middle of the story and intervening in the adventures. The name "Papcio Chmiel" literally means "Papa Hops", however in this case "Chmiel" is an abbreviation of his last name.

Supporting:

- Szympansia – Tytus' wife (a chimpanzee as well) brought to life from a painting by Papcio Chmiel. She appeared only in four stories.

== Books ==
There are 31 published albums called "books" and 8 collective books entitled: "The Gold Book of Adventures", as well as "Book Zero" and "Book of the 80s" containing reprints from "Youth's World" and other newspapers, The TVP (Television Poland) Book, and a collector's release "Tytus, Romek, and A'Tomek as Warsaw insurgents of 1944, drawn from the imagination of Papcio Chmiel".

- Book I (1966) - Tytus Becoming a Scout (birth and humanization of Tytus by joining the Scouts)
- Book II (1967) - Tytus Gets His Driving License (the chief characters get a Rosalie (the figment of Papcio Chmiel) driving license, learning the traffic rules. The book also features the first fantastic vehicle, something that would become a trademark of the series, with each book featuring a different vehicle. For Book II, this is Rosalie the mechanical horse)
- Book III (1968) - Tytus Becoming an Astronaut (the chief characters hijack a rocket (a space shuttle) and travel to outer space, getting to know alien forms of life; vehicles - two rockets and a cosmic animal - Karbulot)
- Book IV (1969) - Tytus Becoming a Soldier (the chief characters play army, as a reward for the pictures of the military they hold true military exercises; vehicles - a Rocketcar (conjunctive spelling deliberate, as in Polish version), a tank). Arguably this is the most propaganda-like book, glorifying the Polish People's Army.
- Book V (1970) - A Trip to a Quarter Circle of the World (the characters take a trip around a quarter circle of the world getting to know such places as Sweden, England, the Arctic, Cuba, Africa, Artek (USSR); vehicle - Bathtuboplane). The book also suffers from rather heavy propaganda, with United States depicted as dangerous (bank robbery) and racist, unlike the friendly and peaceful communist Cuba.
- Book VI (1971) - Tytus Becoming an Olympian (Romek and A'Tomek decide to put Tytus up to Olympiad and they train him in various sport disciplines; vehicles - Hornoplane)
- Book VII (1972) - Tytus Improves on His D from Polish Geography (it's the end of the school year and Tytus is about to have to retake Polish Geography, so Romek and A'Tomek show him around the country; vehicle - jetpack)
- Book VIII (1973) - Tytus Becoming an Astronomer (Operation Frombork, the chief characters help to clean one of the Copernicus cities, a magic apparatus takes them back to the past so they can meet the great astronomer in person)
- Book IX (1974) - Tytus on the Wild West (Tytus jumps into a film about the wild west and becomes a cowboy, Romek and A'Tomek go to his rescue)
- Book X (1975) - Nature Conservation (the chief characters try out a new vehicle which lands on a desert island because of a breakdown. Lack of petrol forces boys to advance through all the ages of humankind's development and to produce it, it pollutes the island's environment; vehicles - Milloplane, and in 1991 version also Grinderoplane)
- Book XI (1977) - Monuments Conservation (stopping the ruins of a historic castle from being demolished, the chief characters meet a friendly ghost who takes them back to the times of old Poland, so they can steal the construction plans for this castle, taking part in an assault of Slygoldies on Jedzosław ( Pol.- Jedz- Eng.-eat; -sław - suffix in very many Polish old-fashioned names) vehicle - Ironoplane)
- Book XII (1977) - Operation Bieszczady 40 (the chief characters set off on a trip to the Bieszczady Mountains in the course of a Scouting campaign to build a camp site; vehicle - Hummingtopoplane)
- Book XIII (1979) - Tytus on the Expedition to the Nonsense Islands (Prof. T. Alent induces the boys to investigate the unknown Nonsense Islands inhabited by a strange community; vehicles - Slidoplane 1 and Slidoplane 2)
- Book XIV (1980) - New Teaching Methods (Romek and A'Tomek establish a school for Tytus and try to teach him elementary subjects, Professor T. Alent's teaching machine comes with help; vehicles - Whistleplane)
- Book XV (1982) - Tytus becoming a Geologist (Again, Prof. T. Alent has the boys accomplish a mission - doing research in the Earth's interior; vehicle - Screwer)
- Book XVI (1981) - Tytus Becoming a Journalist
- Book XVII (1985) - Music Education of Tytus
- Book XVIII (1987) - Plastic Education of Tytus
- Book XIX (1992) - Tytus Becoming an Actor
- Book XX (1992) - Second Expedition to the Nonsense Islands
- Book XXI (1994) - Tytus Among the Ants
- Book XXII (1996) - Tytus Becoming a Gangster
- Book XXIII (1997) - Tytus and Freakdrugs
- Book XXIV (1998) - Tytus in NATO
- Book XXV (2000) - Tytus Gets Married
- Book XXVI (2001) - The Honeymoon of Tytus
- Book XXVII (2002) - Tytus Becoming a Graffiti Artist
- Book XXVIII (2003) - Tytus Becoming an Internet User
- Book XXIX (2004) - Tytus Becoming a Gingerbread Baker
- Book XXX (2006) - A Quest For The Gigglefruit
- Book XXXI (2008) - Tytus Becoming a Football Fan

== In other media ==
- In 1985, a theatre play based on the series was made, and several other plays were made since.
- In 1989 and 1990 two episodes of an animated series were made for Polish public broadcaster TVP.
- A Polish band "Blenders" made a music video about Tytus, Romek and A’Tomek and used the original animated footage of the characters in it.
- In 2002 an animated movie premiered entitled Tytus, Romek i A'Tomek wśród złodziei marzeń (Tytus, Romek and A’Tomek Among the Thieves of Dreams). The film featured Marek Kondrat as the voice of Tytus and was directed by Leszek Gałysz. The movie wasn't based on any of the comic books and it had an original plot. Critical response was generally negative. Many fans criticized the movie for lacking the humour and the spirit of the original material, as well dumbing down the characters for the younger children and focusing too much on the main villain Prince Saligia (who wasn't character from the original stories) pushing Romek and A'tomek to the roles of secondary characters. Colonel Sanders makes a cameo in this movie as KFC was one of main sponsors of the production.
- A Tytus Romek i A’tomek computer game was made in 2005.
- An audio book base on the book "Wyspy nonsensu" was published in 2010.
