= Szarlota Pawel =

Polish comic book artist (1947–2018)

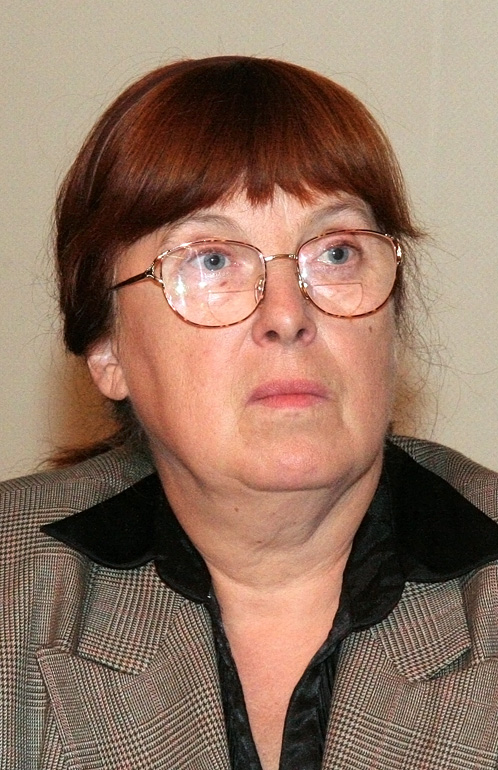
Szarlota Pawel

Szarlota Pawel; actual name, Eugenia Joanna Pawel-Kroll (4 November 1947 – 7 September 2018) was a Polish comic book artist, creator of the popular series about Jonka, Jonek and Kleks, among other comics.
