= Janusz Christa =

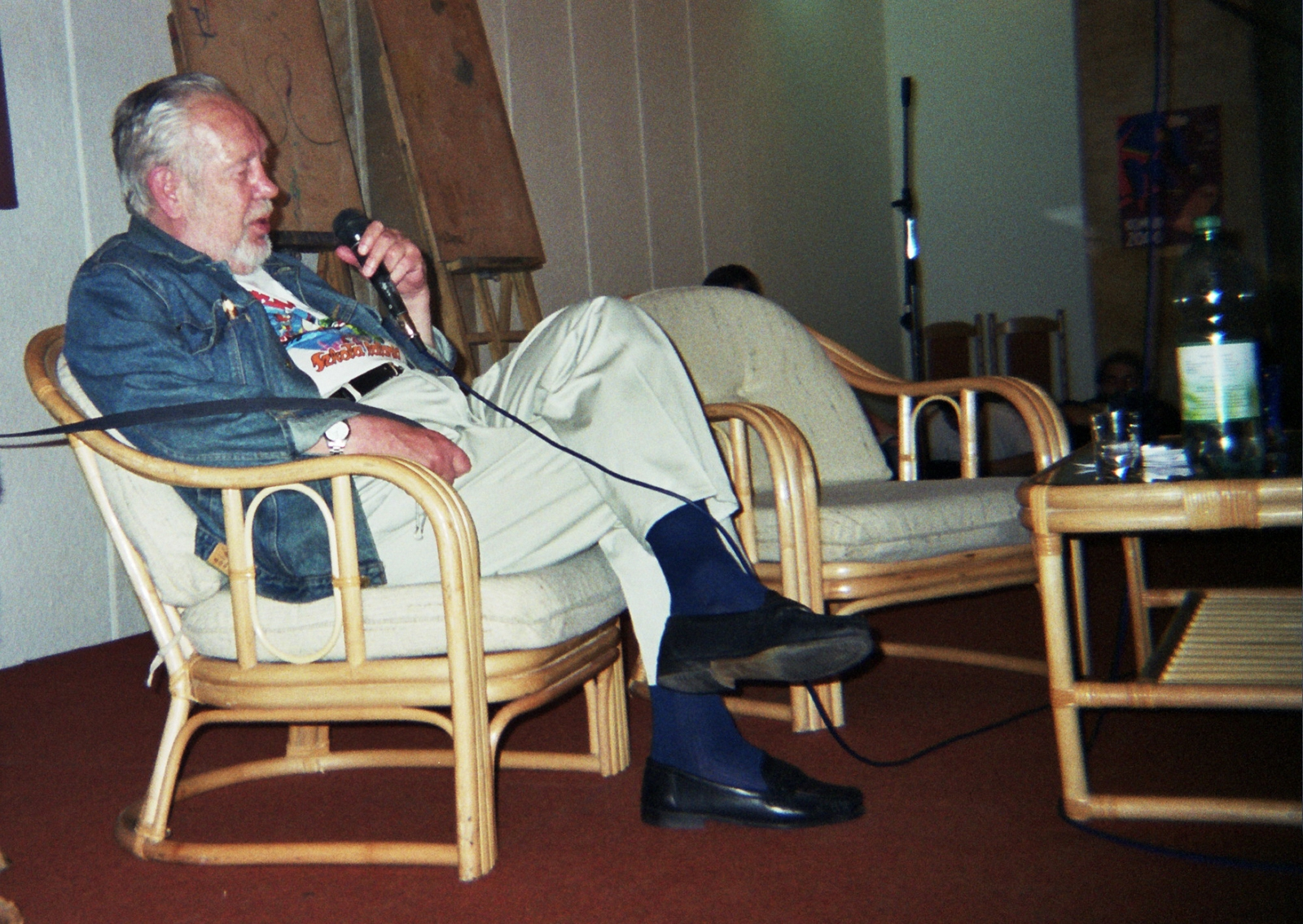
- Janusz Christa (2000)
- Born: 19 July 1934; Wilno, Poland
- Died: 15 November 2008 (aged 74); Sopot, Poland
- Occupation: Comic books's author
- Notable work: Kajtek i Koko; Kajko i Kokosz

Janusz Christa (19 July 1934, Wilno – 15 November 2008, Sopot) was a Polish author of comic books, creator of the comic book series Kajtek i Koko and, perhaps his most well-known, the Kajko i Kokosz series. He debuted in 1957 and many of his works have been printed in the Wieczór Wybrzeza and Świat Młodych magazines. He stopped creative work in the 1990s due to declining health.

Many of his works have been recently re-released in Poland. Notably, one of Kajko and Kokosz books "Szkoła Latania" ("Flying School") became the first comic book to be mandatory school reading. In 2018, some of his books finally received foreign translations, including English, French and Ukrainian. One book was also published in Esperanto.
