= Tadeusz Baranowski (artist) =

Polish comic book artist (1945–2026)

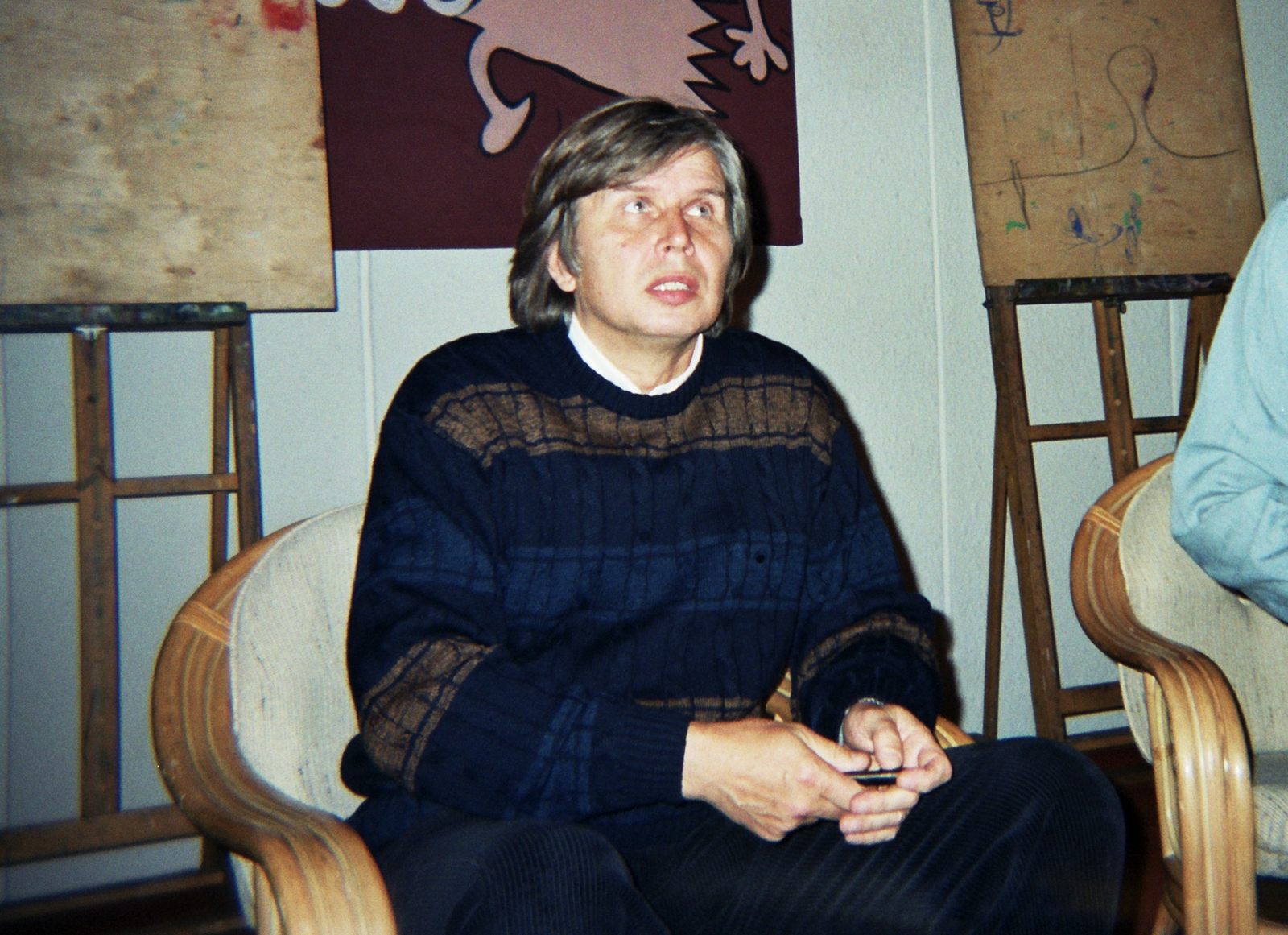
Tadeusz Baranowski during meeting with readers at International Comics Festival in Łódź, 7 October 2000.

Tadeusz Baranowski (6 January 1945 – 7 July 2026) was a Polish comic book artist.

Baranowski published his first comic in 1975 in Świat Młodych.

Being invited by Grzegorz Rosiński, during 1984–1987 he worked a few years in Belgium, publishing some comics in Tintin magazine, Belgium; however, due to interference from magazine owners he quit this job and returned to Poland in the 1990s.

Baranowski died on 7 July 2026, at the age of 81.

== Works ==
Below the first softcover and the first hardcover editions are mentioned.

- Skąd się bierze woda sodowa, MAW 1980, DSW Omnibus 1989
- Na co dybie w wielorybie czubek nosa eskimosa - MAW 1980, MAW 1984
- 3 przygody Sherlocka Bombla - Interpress 1984, Kultura Gniewu/Zin Zin Press 2004
- Antresolka profesorka Nerwosolka - MAW 1985, Egmont Polska 2003, as well as several expanded editions by Ongrys
- Podróż smokiem Diplodokiem - MAW 1986, MAW 1988
- Jak ciotka Fru-Bęc uratowała świat od zagłady - DHW Akapit 1989
- Przepraszam remanent - Bea 1990
- Ecie-pecie o wszechświecie, wynalazku i komecie (2 tomiki) - Story 1990
- Historia wyssana z sopla lodu (scenariusz: Jean Dufaux) - Unipress 1991
- To doprawdy kiepska sprawa, kiedy Bestia się pojawia... - Rok Corporation 1992
- Orient Men: Forever na zawsze - Egmont 2002
- Porady Praktycznego Pana - Egmont 2003
- O zmroku - Kultura Gniewu 2005
- Podróż Smokiem Diplodokiem - Manzoku 2005
- Tffffuj! Do bani z takim komiksem! - Orient Men i Spółka 2005
