= The Strange Adventures of Koziolek Matolek =

- Genre: Animated children's television series
- Based on: Based on the 1933 comics by Kornel Makuszyński and Marian Walentynowicz
- Written by: Roman Dus; Andrzej Lach
- Directed by: Roman Huszczo
- Starring: Wieslaw Michnikowski (opening narration)
- Music by: Adam Markiewicz
- Country of origin: Poland
- No. of episodes: 26

Production
- Running time: Approx. 10 minutes
- Production company: Studio Miniatur Filmowych

Original release
- Release: 1969 – 1971

The Strange Adventures of Matolek, the Billy-Goat (known as Dziwne Przygody Koziolka Matolka in Polish) is an animated children's television series that aired between 1969 and 1971, directed by Roman Huszczo. It is based on the comics produced in 1933 by Kornel Makuszynski (text) and Marian Walentynowicz (artwork). The premise centers around Matolek, a billy-goat who encounters many strange occurrences during his journey to the town of Pacanow, where legend is told they shoe goats. The encounters take place in various time periods from the present day to ancient times. Unlike the musical fairytale Przygody Koziolka Matolka, (which is more faithful to the original comics), the scripts for the television series are completely original with a lot of fast-paced action in each episode. Each episode begins with the following narration, spoken by Wieslaw Michnikowski:

Polish

W Pacanowie kozy kują

więc Koziołek, mądra głowa,

błąka się po całym świecie,

aby dojść do Pacanowa.

Właśnie nową zaczął podróż,

by ją skończyć w Pacanowie.

A co przeżył i co widział

ten artykuł* wam opowie

English translation

In Pacanow, they shoe goats

so Koziolek, a smart fellow

wanders around the entire world

in order to get to Pacanow

He had just begun a new journey

to hopefully end up in Pacanow

And what he experienced and saw

this article*/this film will tell you everything

*In the musical fairytale; "Film ten wszystko wam opowie" in the animated series

As was the case with many animated cartoons made in Poland during that time, the characters don't talk but occasionally make sounds when shocked, startled, etc. (ex. bleating for a goat character).

== Episodes ==
The series consisted of 26 episodes in total:

- Konkurs śpiewu/The Singing Contest (1969; dir. Zofia Oraczewska)
- Kucharz okrętowy/The Ship's Cook (1969; dir. Ryszard Słapczyński)
- Pod piramidami/Under the Pyramids (1969; dir. Ryszard Słapczyński)
- Rajd/The Rally (1969; dir. Piotr Lutczyn)
- Regaty/Regatta (1969; dir. Leonard Pulchny)
- Smocza jama/The Dragon's Den (1969; dir. Zofia Oraczewska)
- W opałach/In Trouble (1969; dir. Stefan Szwakopf)
- Wesoła dżungla/The Merry Jungle (1969; dir. Roman Huszczo)
- Władca pustyni/Lord of the Desert (1969; dir. Roman Huszczo)
- Złoty szlak/The Golden Trail (1969; dir. Bogdan Nowicki)
- Po drugiej stronie tęczy/On The Other Side of the Rainbow (1969; dir. Piotr Szpakowicz)
- Małpi król/The Monkey King (1970; dir. Piotr Lutczyn)
- Zatopiona fregata/The Sunken Frigate (1970; dir. Leonard Pulchny)
- Czarny Bill/ Black Bill (1971; dir. Stefan Szwakopf)
- Gwiazdor filmowy/Movie Star (1971; dir. Ryszard Słapczyński)
- Korsarze/The Corsairs (1971; dir. Piotr Lutczyn)
- Latający kozioł/The Flying Goat (1971; dir. Roman Huszczo)
- Łakomy traper/The Greedy Trapper (1971; dir. Bogdan Nowicki)
- Łapmy lisa/Let's Catch a Fox (1971; dir. Alina Maliszewska)
- Napad na dyliżans/The Stagecoach Robbery ( 1971; dir. Alina Maliszewska)
- Przygoda na szosie/Adventure on the Highway (1971; dir. Piotr Szpakowicz)
- Przyjaciel zwierząt/Friend of the Animals (1971; dir. Piotr Szpakowicz)
- Telegrafista/The Telegraphist (1971; dir. Piotr Szpakowicz)
- Upał/Heatwave (1971; dir. Bogdan Nowicki)
- W poszukiwaniu przyjaźni/In Search of Friendship (1971; dir. Stefan Szwakopf)
- Żeby kózka nie skakała/So the Goat Wouldn't Jump (1971; dir. Roman Huszczo)

== Distribution ==
All episodes were released on VHS, with each cassette containing 6 to 7 episodes. The 2003 DVD release, with 12 episodes per disc, is missing 2 episodes, "Movie Star" and "The Greedy Trapper". In 2008, a full-length feature film titled, Koziolek Matolek and the Toy Snatchers, was to be released but was cancelled.

== In popular culture ==
In the TV series, Swiat Wedlug Kiepskich (The Lousy World), one of the characters, Rozalia Kiepska, is a big fan of the series. The episode Wladca Pustyni (Lord of the Desert) appears in various episodes.
