= Zborówek =

Zborówek may refer to:

- Zborówek, Lesser Poland Voivodeship, a village in the administrative district of Gmina Biskupice, Wieliczka County, Lesser Poland Voivodeship, Poland
- Zborówek, Świętokrzyskie Voivodeship, a village in the administrative district of Gmina Pacanów, Busko County, Świętokrzyskie Voivodeship, Poland
- Zborówek Nowy, a village in the administrative district of Gmina Pacanów, Poland
