= Rataje Karskie =

- Village
- Location within Poland
- Coordinates: 50°20′31″N 21°2′32″E
- Country: Poland
- Voivodeship: Świętokrzyskie
- County: Busko
- Gmina: Pacanów
- Population: 219

Rataje Karskie [raˈtajɛ ˈkarskʲɛ] is a village in the administrative district of Gmina Pacanów, in Busko County, Świętokrzyskie Voivodeship, in south-central Poland. It lies approximately 7 km (4 mi) south of Pacanów, and 68 km (42 mi) south-east of the regional capital Kielce.
