= Maciej Parowski =

Polish science fiction writer (1946–2019)

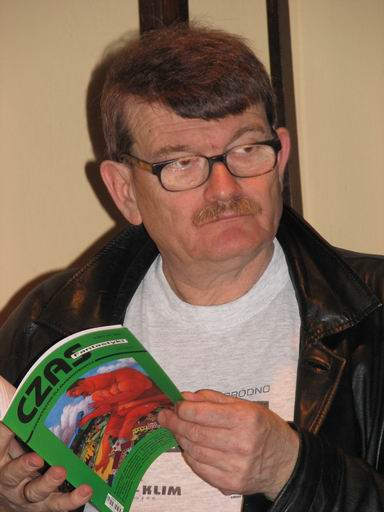
Maciej Parowski in 2006

Maciej Parowski (27 December 1946, in Warsaw – 2 June 2019, in Warsaw) was a Polish journalist, essayist, science fiction writer, editor and translator.

He has been called "a legend of the Polish science fiction and fantasy scene".

== Life and career ==
He was born on 27 December 1946 in Warsaw. He worked as a critic of science-fiction, chief editor of Nowa Fantastyka from 1992–2003, and editor of several science-fiction series and anthologies. Chief editor of Czas Fantastyki. Author of several science-fiction stories and a book, from the social science-fiction genre, most of his fiction works are from 1970s and 1980s. In the late 1990s he was involved in a major discussion in Polish science-fiction literature, revolving around the Janusz A. Zajdel Award and the distinction between "serious" and "pop" sci-fi. Editor and supporter of several Polish comics.

He has been credited with popularizing Star Wars franchise in Poland.

In 2006 he received an award for support of Polish comics, the Humoris Causa. In 2007, he received silver medal for cultural achievements Gloria Artis from Polish Minister of Culture, and in 2010 – Mackiewicz Prize (second place) for novel "Burza".

== Works ==
=== Books ===
- Bez dubbingu (collection of essays, Młodzieżowa Agencja Wydawnicza 1978)
- Twarzą ku ziemi (novel, Czytelnik 1982)
- Sposób na kobiety (anthology of short stories, KAW 1985)
- Czas fantastyki (essays, interviews, reviews; Glob 1990)
- Burza. Ucieczka z Warszawy '40 (novel; Narodowe Centrum Kultury 2009)
- Małpy Pana Boga. Słowa (essays, interviews, reviews; Narodowe Centrum Kultury 2011)

=== Comics ===
- Funky Koval (1987–1992, 2010), with Bogusław Polch
- Wiedźmin (The Witcher, 1993–1995), with Andrzej Sapkowski and Bogusław Polch

== See also ==
- Science fiction and fantasy in Poland
