= Funky Koval =

Polish science fiction detective comic book

- Created by: Jacek Rodek; Maciej Parowski; Bogusław Polch

Publication information
- Publisher: Fantastyka
- Original language: Polish
- Genre: Science fiction
- Publication date: 1982–2010

Reprints
- The series has been reprinted, at least in part, in Hungarian and Czech.

Cover of Funky Koval #1, 1987.

Funky Koval is a Polish science fiction/detective story/political fiction genre comic book series published in Poland from the 1980s, collected in four volumes. The story was written by Jacek Rodek and Maciej Parowski, with art drawn by Bogusław Polch. The resulting science fiction comic gained a cult following in Poland and is recognized as one of the best Polish comics. It debuted in 1982 in Fantastyka, a Polish sci-fi magazine, and was later released in color albums. The final instalment was published in 2010.

== Development ==
The initial scenario for the comic about the adventures of a space detective was created by Wiktor Żwikiewicz and Jacek Rodek, however Żwikiewicz soon afterward withdraw from the project, and was replaced by Maciej Parowski; Rodek and Parowski are credited as the main writers for all volumes. The drawings were done by Bogusław Polch. Both the writers and the artist were familiar with and inspired by a number of Western works, from French Métal hurlant to American Star Wars, and intended to bring this style of science fiction aesthetic to the Polish readers. The initial title for the project (and main character) was Punky Rock, but it was renamed to Funky Koval following Polch's suggestion; the new name retained the music motif but also added a Polish element. Describing the initial concept, Parowski described the concept for the main character as a mixture of Stanisław Lem's Pirx and Raymond Chandler's Marlow.

The first episodes were more of the independent 'comic short story' format, as the writers wanted to experiment with different ideas. After the first two short stories were published, the comic moved to more lengthy, novel-like plots, following urging by Polch who argued for more consistency.

== Release history ==
The comic debuted in November 1982 on four black and white pages in the second issue of Fantastyka, a Polish sci-fi magazine, and continued to be published in this format for about two years (1982-1983), then it resumed for another two years (1985-1986) and finally, resumed again for the third time (1991-1992).

In 1987, the comics were released in albums, colored and with some additional panels to allow easier transition between various stories. The first album, Bez oddechu (Breathless) contained collected the episodic stories published in Fantastyka in 1982-1983. The second, Sam przeciw wszystkim (Alone against everyone), released in 1988, collected the stories published in Fantastyka in 1985-1986; and the third, Wbrew sobie (Against oneself), released in 1992, the ones from 1991-1992, published in Nowa Fantastyka (a successor magazine to Fantastyka).

Gossip and semi-official promises about that new parts of the comics have been circulating for many years. In 2002 Polch discussed tentative plans to create a prequel (part 0 - Szalony pilot, Crazy pilot), as well as sequels (part 4 - Aż na koniec świata, To the end of the world, and 5 - Dom wariatów, Madhouse); while Maciej Parowski suggested another working title for a sequel, Bez litości (No Mercy). In 2004 plans for the new part to be published in Nowa Fantastyka fell apart due to disagreements between the authors and the publisher. No official announcement have been made until 2010, when the new story started to be serialised in the monthly science fiction magazine Nowa Fantastyka. The fourth part was eventually titled Wrogie przejęcie (Hostile takeover) and it was released in a stand-alone album in 2011. A 6 page-short independent story, Na białym szumie (On white noise), was also published in 2011.

The first two albums were released in the Komiks-Fantastyka imprint. Two more complete, single-volume editions were released by Prószyński i S-ka in early 1990s and 2010s. Klasyka Polskiego Komiksu - Funky Koval, collecting the first three albums in one book, was released by Egmont Polska in 2002, and Funky Koval. Wydanie kolekcjonerskie. 4 tomy, collecting all four albums, was released by Prószyński Media in 2014.

The first album was also translated to Hungarian (in 1986). There was also a Czech translation.

== Art ==
Sample page from Funky Koval #1

A notable feature of the comic is the art of Bogusław Polch, known for his unique style and minute attention to details. He was known to put much more details into his drawings than could be actually printed in the comics; many of his panels are rich with tiny details - for example, in one panel showing Koval's room the reader can see names of the books and magazines on his bookshelf (they include works by Philip K. Dick, Stanislaw Lem and the 'Fantastyka' magazine). Many gadgets have logos of known companies (such as Sharp and Sony), and their characteristics shapes - of videophones, guns, spaceships or flying cars - are also one of the trademarks of that comic book. Polch also based faces of many of the series characters on those of his co-workers (while the writers adapted their names, and included themselves there as well, as Jack Roddey and Matt Parey).

The art in the third series is different from that in the first two: in the third series Polch experimented with more simple style, sometimes bordering on caricatures. This change proved to be a disappointment to some fans used to his earlier, more detailed and realistic style.

== Plot summary ==
Cover of Funky Koval #2, 1988.

The plot resolves around the figure of former military pilot and now space detective, Funky Koval, who with his friends and colleagues forms a private detective agency "Universs" and solves various cases in the futuristic world of the 2080s. His investigations range from corruption in the police and government, through fighting cultists and terrorists, investigating missing spaceships and illegal slave camps, to the mystery of the Drolls aliens, who have a much more advanced technology than the humans, and whose plans for the humanity - if any - remain a mystery.

== Reception and cultural impact ==
At first, the reception of the comic was lukewarm, with many readers of Fantastyka questioning whether the magazine should devote space to a comic. After some initial misgivings, however, the series became highly popular. Adam Rusek called Funky Koval "one of the most famous heroes in the history of [Polish comic books]". This comic is considered a classic, even described as "the best Polish comic ever", and gained a cult following in Poland, partially due to the high quality of drawings and entertaining plot, and partially due to many subtle connections with the reality of the 1980s Poland (martial law in Poland, Jerzy Urban, Polish Round Table Agreement). Although some of those elements are no longer easily read by modern audience, the comic is still seen as one of the best Polish sci-fi works, and continues to influence recent works. It helped launch a dedicated comic supplement to Fantastyka, Komiks-Fantastyka; its success has been credited with establishing a market for adult comics in Poland. Likewise, Funky Koval helped to popularize action and adventure genres in Polish sci-fi, as well as partial nudity (female toplessness) as acceptable in Polish comics.

Michał Cetnarowski, discussing the series in Nowa Fantastyka in 2007, noted that the second album is considered the best, as the first was too episodic, and the third, overly complex. He also observed it was a milestone in the development of Polish comics, a homegrown work in the "Western" style (also set in the West), focusing on action and adventure, but also with complex world building in the background. Cetnarowski also praised Polch's artwork, which was much more detailed than most other art found in contemporary comics, and particularly his intricate, detailed backgrounds. Cetnarowski did note that the comic has its faults, such as too many author's notes on the margins, trying to explain or narrate various aspects. The plot is sometimes too chaotic, and deux ex machina problem can be seen on several occasions.

In 2010, Tomasz Kołodziejczak, also discussing the series in Nowa Fantastyka, called it "a great comic", nothing that the story holds well even after twenty years, and it certainly would benefit from being continued.

== Related media ==
In 1985 Parowski published a short story featuring Koval, Ostatnia przygoda Funky'ego (Funky's Last Aventure), in an anthology of his short stories, Sposób na kobiety.

In 2003 a parody comic, Franky Krova ("Franky Kow") was published (written by Tobiasz Piątkowski and drawn by Robin Adler).

In 2008 Polch told the press than an American producer that has bought the rights to the trilogy. The movie is based on Bez Oddechu. In 2011 it was announced that the movie is to be produced by Josi W. Konski and Roland von Ciel with a $37 million budget, with the planned release as early as 2012. The planned title was Adventures of Funky Koval, and among the considered actors were Matthew McConaughey and Borys Szyc.

== See also ==
- The Gods from Outer Space
- The Witcher (Prószyński i S-ka)
