= Trzebica =

- Village
- Location within Poland
- Coordinates: 50°20′7″N 20°58′33″E
- Country: Poland
- Voivodeship: Świętokrzyskie
- County: Busko
- Gmina: Pacanów
- Population: 224

Trzebica [tʂɛˈbit͡sa] is a village in the administrative district of Gmina Pacanów, within Busko County, Świętokrzyskie Voivodeship, in south-central Poland. It lies approximately 9 km (6 mi) south-west of Pacanów, 24 km (15 mi) south-east of Busko-Zdrój, and 66 km (41 mi) south-east of the regional capital Kielce.
