= Grabowica, Świętokrzyskie Voivodeship =

Grabowica
- Village
- Location within Poland
- Coordinates: 50°22′20″N 21°6′33″E
- Country: Poland
- Voivodeship: Świętokrzyskie
- County: Busko
- Gmina: Pacanów
- Population: 191

Grabowica [ɡrabɔˈvit͡sa] is a village in the administrative district of Gmina Pacanów, within Busko County, Świętokrzyskie Voivodeship, in south-central Poland. It lies approximately 6 km (4 mi) south-east of Pacanów, 30 km (19 mi) east of Busko-Zdrój, and 67 km (42 mi) south-east of the regional capital Kielce.
