= Kółko Żabieckie =

- Village
- Location within Poland
- Coordinates: 50°20′49″N 21°5′56″E
- Country: Poland
- Voivodeship: Świętokrzyskie
- County: Busko
- Gmina: Pacanów
- Population: 538

Kółko Żabieckie [ˈkuu̯kɔ ʐaˈbjɛt͡skʲɛ] is a village in the administrative district of Gmina Pacanów, within Busko County, Świętokrzyskie Voivodeship, in south-central Poland. It lies approximately 7 km (4 mi) south-east of Pacanów, 31 km (19 mi) south-east of Busko-Zdrój, and 69 km (43 mi) south-east of the regional capital Kielce.

The village is best known for its annual "Celebration of the Sun", which is themed around a regional variant of the folk tale, The Peasant's Wise Daughter.
