= Chrzanów, Świętokrzyskie Voivodeship =

Chrzanów
- Village
- Location within Poland
- Coordinates: 50°24′18″N 20°59′42″E
- Country: Poland
- Voivodeship: Świętokrzyskie
- County: Busko
- Gmina: Pacanów
- Population: 241

Chrzanów [ˈxʂanuf] is a village in the administrative district of Gmina Pacanów, within Busko County, Świętokrzyskie Voivodeship, in south-central Poland. It lies approximately 4 km (2 mi) west of Pacanów, 21 km (13 mi) east of Busko-Zdrój, and 60 km (37 mi) south-east of the regional capital Kielce.
