= Oblekoń =

- Village
- Location within Poland
- Coordinates: 50°19′N 21°1′E
- Country: Poland
- Voivodeship: Świętokrzyskie
- County: Busko
- Gmina: Pacanów
- Population: 680

Oblekoń [ɔˈblɛkɔɲ] is a village in the administrative district of Gmina Pacanów, within Busko County, Świętokrzyskie Voivodeship, in south-central Poland. It lies approximately 10 km (6 mi) south of Pacanów, 28 km (17 mi) south-east of Busko-Zdrój, and 69 km (43 mi) south-east of the regional capital Kielce.
