= Karsy Duże =

- Village
- Location within Poland
- Coordinates: 50°23′22″N 21°4′2″E
- Country: Poland
- Voivodeship: Świętokrzyskie
- County: Busko
- Gmina: Pacanów
- Population: 81

Karsy Duże [ˈkarsɨ ˈduʐɛ] is a village in the administrative district of Gmina Pacanów, within Busko County, Świętokrzyskie Voivodeship, in south-central Poland. It lies approximately 2 km (1 mi) south-east of Pacanów, 27 km (17 mi) east of Busko-Zdrój, and 64 km (40 mi) south-east of the regional capital Kielce.
