= Komorów, Busko County =

Komorów
- Village
- Location within Poland
- Coordinates: 50°21′40″N 21°6′21″E
- Country: Poland
- Voivodeship: Świętokrzyskie
- County: Busko
- Gmina: Pacanów
- Population: 389
- Time zone: UTC+1 (CET)
  - Summer (DST): UTC+2 (CEST)
- Vehicle registration: TBU

Komorów [kɔˈmɔruf] is a village in the administrative district of Gmina Pacanów, within Busko County, Świętokrzyskie Voivodeship, in southern Poland. It lies approximately 6 km (4 mi) south-east of Pacanów, 30 km (19 mi) south-east of Busko-Zdrój, and 68 km (42 mi) south-east of the regional capital Kielce.

During the January Uprising, on 20 June 1863, it was the site of the Battle of Komorów between Polish insurgents and Russian troops.
