= Podwale, Świętokrzyskie Voivodeship =

Podwale
- Village
- Location within Poland
- Coordinates: 50°20′49″N 21°0′11″E
- Country: Poland
- Voivodeship: Świętokrzyskie
- County: Busko
- Gmina: Pacanów
- Population: 140

Podwale [pɔdˈvalɛ] is a village in the administrative district of Gmina Pacanów, within Busko County, Świętokrzyskie Voivodeship, in south-central Poland. It lies approximately 7 km (4 mi) south-west of Pacanów, 25 km (16 mi) south-east of Busko-Zdrój, and 66 km (41 mi) south-east of the regional capital Kielce.
