= Żabiec =

- Village
- Location within Poland
- Coordinates: 50°20′58″N 21°3′22″E
- Country: Poland
- Voivodeship: Świętokrzyskie
- County: Busko
- Gmina: Pacanów
- Population: 439

Żabiec [ˈʐabjɛt͡s] is a village in the administrative district of Gmina Pacanów, within Busko County, Świętokrzyskie Voivodeship, in south-central Poland. It lies approximately 6 km (4 mi) south of Pacanów, 28 km (17 mi) south-east of Busko-Zdrój, and 67 km (42 mi) south-east of the regional capital Kielce.
