= Wójcza =

- Village
- Location within Poland
- Coordinates: 50°23′34″N 20°58′41″E
- Country: Poland
- Voivodeship: Świętokrzyskie
- County: Busko
- Gmina: Pacanów
- Population: 378

Wójcza [ˈvui̯t͡ʂa] is a village in the administrative district of Gmina Pacanów, within Busko County, Świętokrzyskie Voivodeship, in south-central Poland. It lies approximately 6 km (4 mi) west of Pacanów, 21 km (13 mi) south-east of Busko-Zdrój, and 61 km (38 mi) south-east of the regional capital Kielce.
