= Kwasów =

- Village
- Location within Poland
- Coordinates: 50°25′26″N 21°1′53″E
- Country: Poland
- Voivodeship: Świętokrzyskie
- County: Busko
- Gmina: Pacanów
- Population: 223

Kwasów [ˈkfasuf] is a village in the administrative district of Gmina Pacanów, within Busko County, Świętokrzyskie Voivodeship, in south-central Poland. It lies approximately 3 km (2 mi) north-west of Pacanów, 23 km (14 mi) east of Busko-Zdrój, and 59 km (37 mi) south-east of the regional capital Kielce.
