= Niegosławice =

Niegosławice may refer to the following places in Poland:

- Niegosławice, Lubusz Voivodeship (west Poland), formerly Waltersdorf
- Niegosławice, Busko County in Świętokrzyskie Voivodeship (south-central Poland)
- Niegosławice, Jędrzejów County in Świętokrzyskie Voivodeship (south-central Poland)
- Niegosławice, Pińczów County in Świętokrzyskie Voivodeship (south-central Poland)
