= Słupia, Busko County =

Słupia
- Village
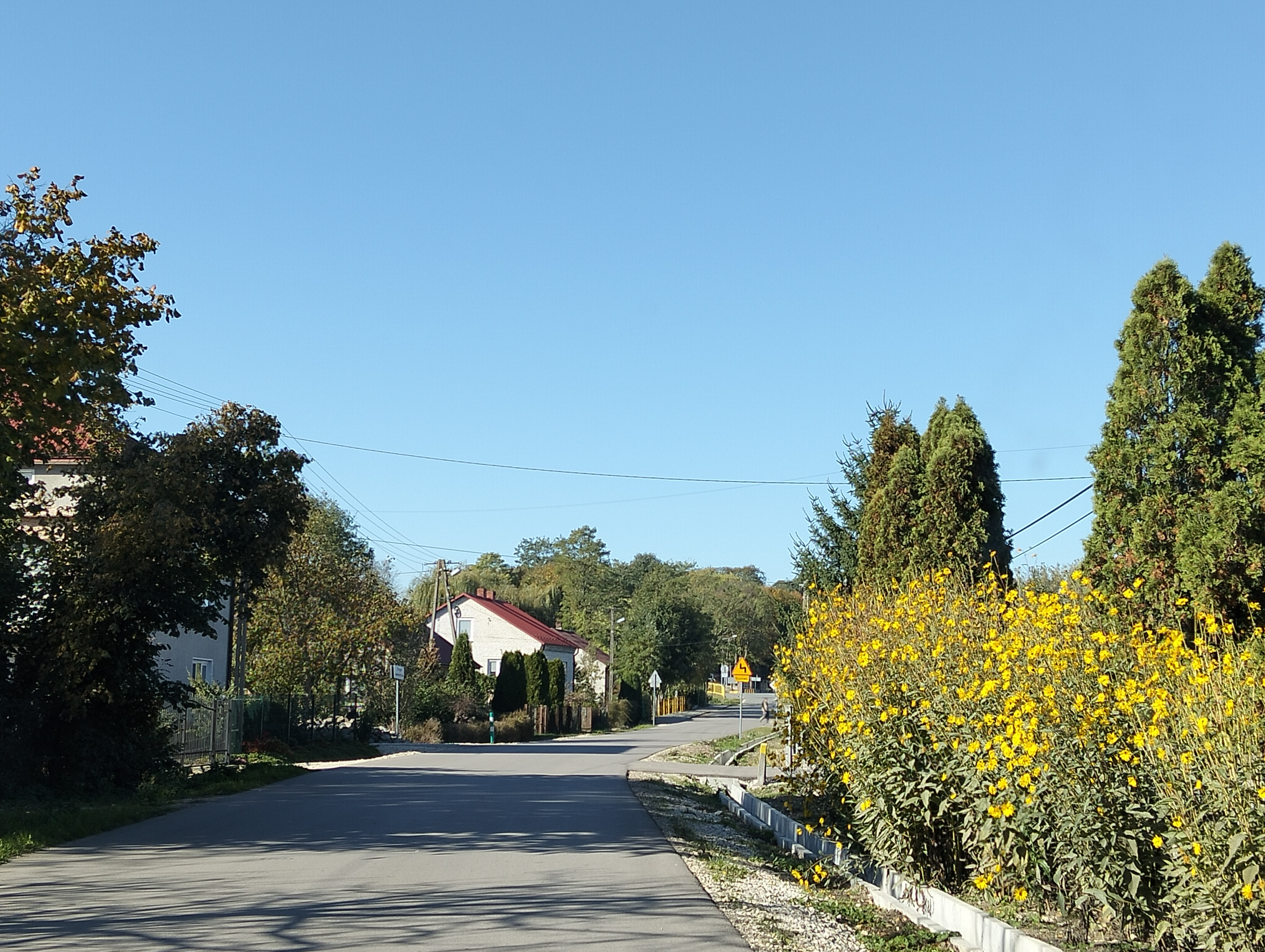

- Location within Poland
- Coordinates: 50°22′55″N 21°2′26″E
- Country: Poland
- Voivodeship: Świętokrzyskie
- County: Busko
- Gmina: Pacanów
- Population: 642

Słupia [ˈswupja] is a village in the administrative district of Gmina Pacanów, within Busko County, Świętokrzyskie Voivodeship, in south-central Poland. It lies approximately 3 km (2 mi) south of Pacanów, 25 km (16 mi) east of Busko-Zdrój, and 64 km (40 mi) south-east of the regional capital Kielce.
