= Biechów =

Biechów may refer to the following places:

- Biechów, Opole Voivodeship (south-west Poland)
- Biechów, Busko County in Świętokrzyskie Voivodeship (south-central Poland)
- Biechów, Ostrowiec County in Świętokrzyskie Voivodeship (south-central Poland)
