= Książnice =

Książnice may refer to the following places:

- Książnice, Lesser Poland Voivodeship (south Poland)
- Książnice, Subcarpathian Voivodeship (south-east Poland)
- Książnice, Świętokrzyskie Voivodeship (south-central Poland)
