= Koziołek Matołek =

- Koziołek Matołek (Silly the Billy-Goat), drawing from the original Koziołek Matołek comic book

Publication information
- First appearance: 1933
- Created by: Kornel Makuszyński (story) and Marian Walentynowicz (art)

In-story information
- Species: Anthropomorphic goat
- Place of origin: Pacanów, Poland

Koziołek Matołek (Silly the Billy-Goat) is a fictional character created by Kornel Makuszyński (story) and Marian Walentynowicz (art) in one of the first and most famous Polish comics back in 1933. It became a cult classic, popular since its creation till today, and becoming an important part of the canon of Polish children's literature.

== History ==
Makuszyński and Walentynowicz created four books: 120 przygód Koziołka Matołka ("120 adventures of Koziołek Matołek"), Druga księga przygód Koziołka Matołka ("second book of adventures of Koziołek Matołek"), Trzecia księga przygód Koziołka Matołka ("third book of adventures of Koziołek Matołek") and Czwarta księga przygód Koziołka Matołka ("fourth book of adventures of Koziołek Matołek").

Pacanów, the setting of the comic, is a real town in Poland. Once when Makuszyński and Walentynowicz were sitting in a coffee house in Kraków, they spotted a sad looking man sipping a drink at a nearby table. They asked him why he looked so gloomy, and he told them that he came from the small town of Pacanów and was wondering how to help the town prosper. Makuszyński and Walentynowicz decided then to help him by popularizing the small town in their books.

== Story ==
The stories center around the quest that Matołek, an anthropomorphic goat, undertakes: to find Pacanów, a town where it is rumoured they make shoes for goats. Matołek's adventures are amusing if sometimes surreal. The titular hero is nice, naive, clumsy, laughable and not very bright — in many regards similar to another famous children's story character, Winnie the Pooh by A.A. Milne. As an adventure comic strip the stories are roughly contemporaneous with characters such as Rupert Bear and Tintin and Milou. Matołek's search for Pacanów takes him to many corners of the Earth, from Africa to the Wild West.

The stories have visible patriotic undertones, from Matołek's colors (white fur and red shorts, evoking the flag of Poland) to his homesick feelings for Poland, which appear when he finds himself in far-away places.

== Form ==
The comic has a specific format: each page is divided into regular, rectangular frames with each illustration accompanied by a rhythmical 8-syllabical quatrain. The most popular illustrations come from the third edition, the first two had a different style of art.

== Influence ==
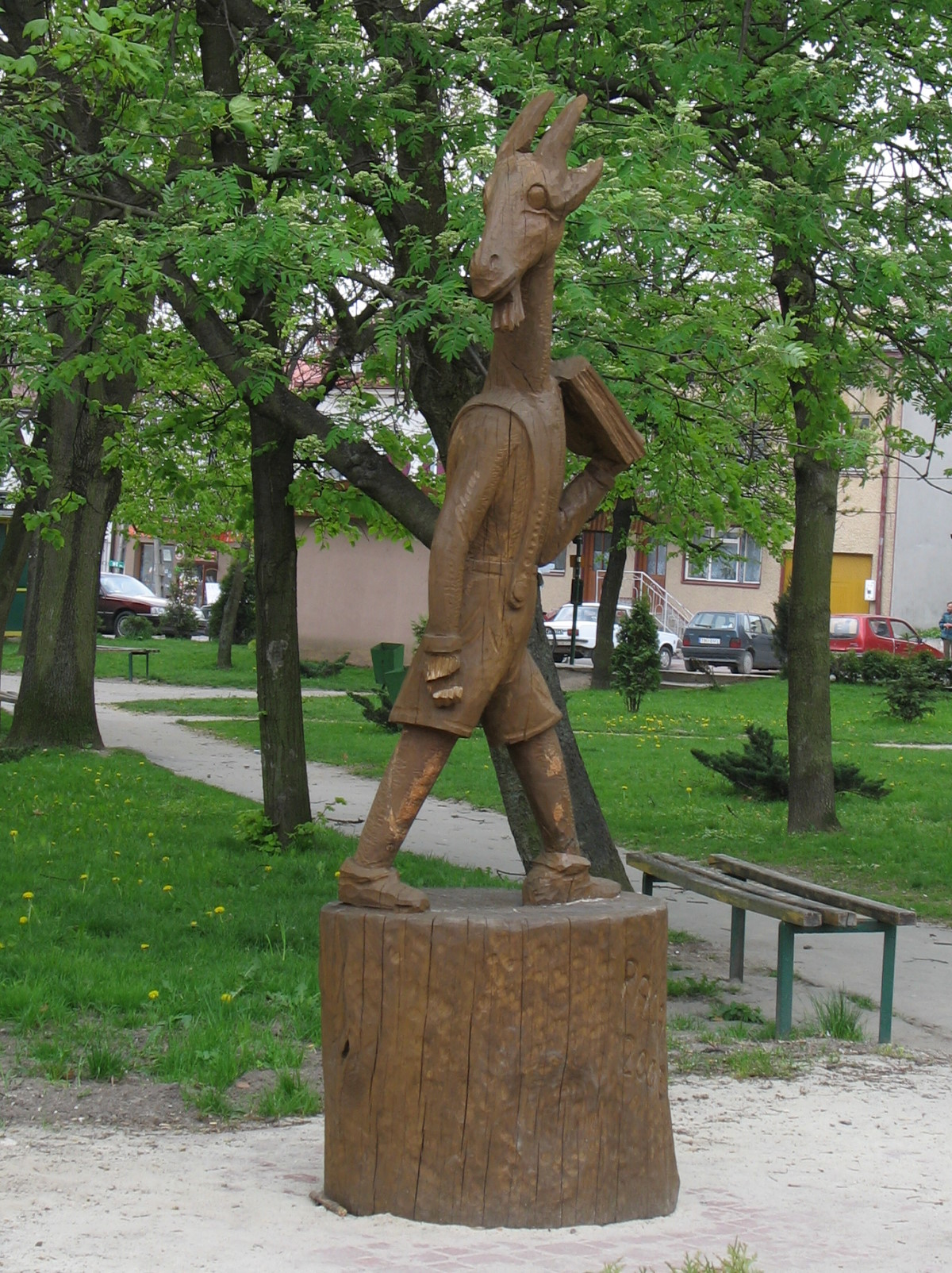
Statue of Koziołek Matołek in Pacanów.

The comic has influenced many generations of Poles, and some of its phrases have penetrated into the Polish language itself, with expressions like 'w Pacanowie kozy kują' (In Pacanów, they shoe goats), 'pacan' and 'matoł' (slowpoke, dummy).

In 2003 Polish minister of culture Waldemar Dąbrowski organized the celebrations of Koziołek Matołek's 70th birthday in Pacanów.

== Adaptations and other media ==
Studio Miniatur Filmowych produced the animated series Dziwne przygody Koziołka Matołka (Strange adventures of Koziołek Matołek) from 1969 to 1971. The animated series was released as a 3-DVD set in 2002 and is available internationally; although there are no English language subtitles, the amount of dialogue is very limited. Studio Miniatur Filmowych has started work on a full-length animated film featuring Koziołek Matołek.

Four educational games for small children have been released: 'Koziołek Matołek idzie do szkoły' (Koziołek Matołek goes to school), 'Koziołek Matołek wynalazca' (Koziołek Matołek the inventor), 'Szkoła Koziołka Matołka' (The school of Koziołek Matołek), and 'Wesołe przedszkole Koziołka Matołka' (The happy kindergarten of Koziołek Matołek)

The series has also been adapted for children's theatre.

== See also ==
- Rupert Bear
- Tintin and Milou
