= Karsy Dolne =

- Village
- Location within Poland
- Coordinates: 50°22′42″N 21°4′28″E
- Country: Poland
- Voivodeship: Świętokrzyskie
- County: Busko
- Gmina: Pacanów
- Population: 52

Karsy Dolne [ˈkarsɨ ˈdɔlnɛ] is a village in the administrative district of Gmina Pacanów, within Busko County, Świętokrzyskie Voivodeship, in south-central Poland. It lies approximately 3 km (2 mi) south-east of Pacanów, 28 km (17 mi) east of Busko-Zdrój, and 65 km (40 mi) south-east of the regional capital Kielce.
