= Sroczków =

- Village
- Location within Poland
- Coordinates: 50°25′4″N 21°3′51″E
- Country: Poland
- Voivodeship: Świętokrzyskie
- County: Busko
- Gmina: Pacanów
- Population: 466

Sroczków [ˈsrɔt͡ʂkuf] is a village in the administrative district of Gmina Pacanów, within Busko County, Świętokrzyskie Voivodeship, in south-central Poland. It lies approximately 3 km (2 mi) north-east of Pacanów, 26 km (16 mi) east of Busko-Zdrój, and 61 km (38 mi) south-east of the regional capital Kielce.
