= Rataje Słupskie =

- Village
- Location within Poland
- Coordinates: 50°19′N 21°3′E
- Country: Poland
- Voivodeship: Świętokrzyskie
- County: Busko
- Gmina: Pacanów
- Population: 670

Rataje Słupskie [raˈtajɛ ˈswupskʲɛ] is a village in the administrative district of Gmina Pacanów, in Busko County, Świętokrzyskie Voivodeship, in south-central Poland. It lies approximately 10 km (6 mi) south of Pacanów, 29 km (18 mi) south-east of Busko-Zdrój, and 70 km (43 mi) south-east of the regional capital Kielce.
