= Biskupice, Busko County =

Biskupice
- Village
- Location within Poland
- Coordinates: 50°24′13″N 21°6′26″E
- Country: Poland
- Voivodeship: Świętokrzyskie
- County: Busko
- Gmina: Pacanów
- Population: 148

Biskupice [biskuˈpit͡sɛ] is a village in the administrative district of Gmina Pacanów, within Busko County, Świętokrzyskie Voivodeship, in south-central Poland. It lies approximately 5 km (3 mi) east of Pacanów, 29 km (18 mi) east of Busko-Zdrój, and 64 km (40 mi) south-east of the regional capital Kielce.
