= Bogusław Polch =

Polish cartoonist (1941–2020)

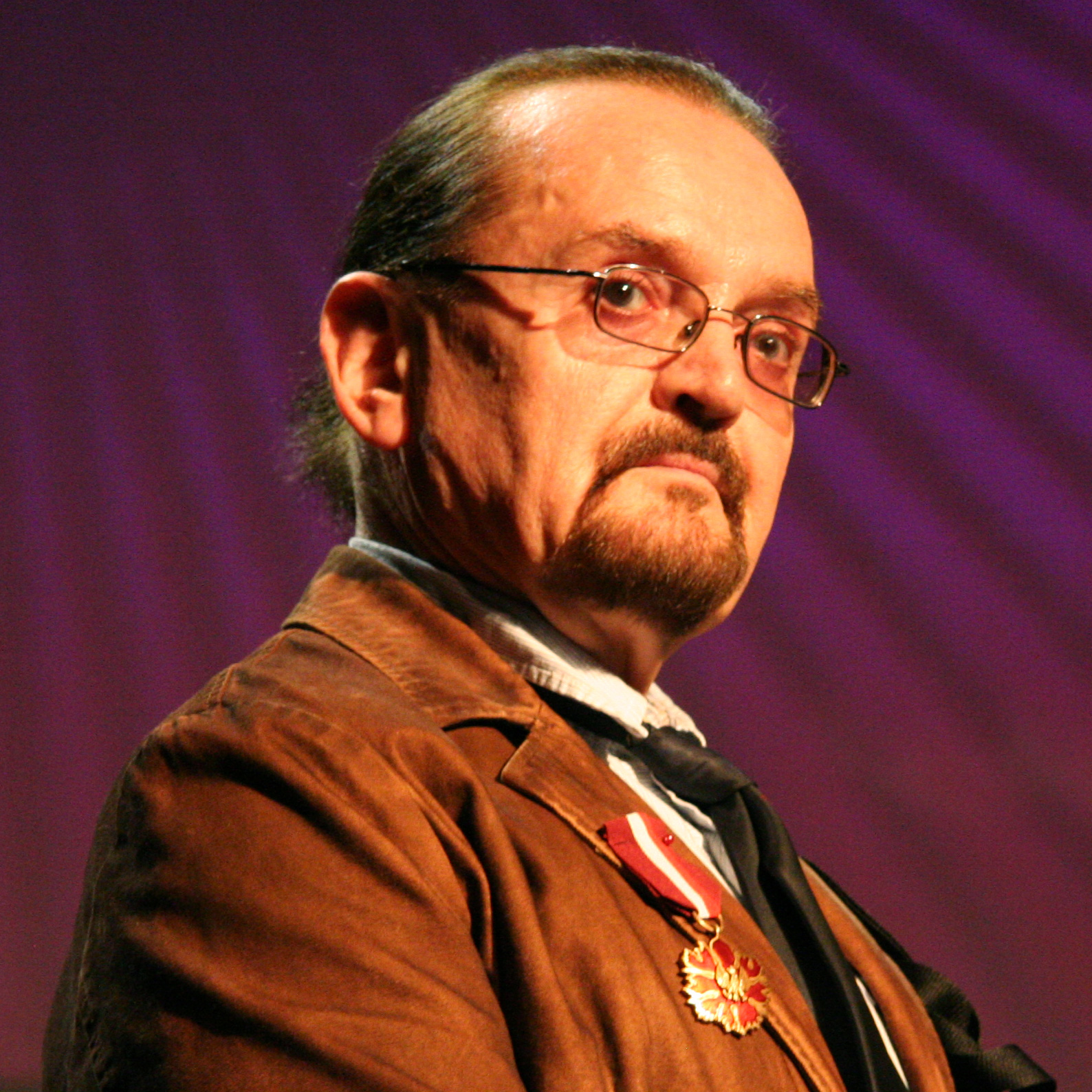
- Born: 5 October 1941
- Died: 2 January 2020 (aged 78)
- Area: Artist
- Notable works: Die Götter aus dem All (Bogowie z kosmosu / Ekspedycja), Funky Koval, Wiedźmin (The Witcher), Jan Tenner, Kapitan Żbik
- Collaborators: Maciej Parowski, Jacek Rodek, Andrzej Sapkowski, Arnold Mostowicz, Alfred Górny, Ryszard Siwanowicz

Bogusław Polch (originally Połch, 5 October 1941 – 2 January 2020) was a Polish comic book artist. His most notable works include the series The Gods from Outer Space (based on Erich von Däniken books, written by Arnold Mostowicz and Alfred Górny), Funky Koval (written by Maciej Parowski and Jacek Rodek) and Wiedźmin (based on Andrzej Sapkowski's The Witcher stories, written by Maciej Parowski). He also illustrated the covers of the first editions of most of Sapkowski's books in The Witcher series.

== Early life ==
He was born in 1941 in Łyszczyce near Brest (currently Belarus). In 1967 he graduated from the Public High School of Fine Arts in Warsaw where he attended same classes together with Grzegorz Rosiński.

== Comic books ==
His career started in 1958 by publishing two short stories Wyprawa via kosmos and Słoneczny rejs przygody in Korespondent Wszędobylski magazine. His first professional comic book was "Złoty" Mauritius published in 1970, part of the popular Kapitan Żbik series. Bogusław was referred to a publisher by Grzegorz Rosiński who created some of the previous parts. By 1975 Bogusław was responsible for seven comic books for the series and moved on to author Spotkanie (Encounter), a sci-fi story written by Ryszard Siwanowicz, published in 1976 in the Relax magazine (where Grzegorz Rosiński was a chief editor).

The turning point of his career was authoring The Gods from Outer Space inspired by Erich von Däniken books, when yet again he was referred to Econ Verlag (ordering party) and Bastei Verlag (publisher) by Grzegorz Rosiński. Between 1978 and 1982 he created a series of eight comic books written by Arnold Mostowicz and Alfred Górny that ultimately got published in twelve different languages and sold in millions of copies worldwide. In 1982 he created a comic book ordered by a UNESCO Fair Play Committee Rycerze Fair Play (Fair Play Knights) that ultimately got only published in Poland in 1986. Following this brief episode in 1982 Bogusław began his cooperation with Maciej Parowski (godfather of the Polish sci-fi scene) and Jacek Rodek on Funky Koval, the comic book that became his personal favourite. In 1984-1985 he created a series of four comic books Jan Tenner.

Between 1987 and 1992 a series of three Funky Koval comic books got published gaining a cult of local followers. Unofficially Funky Koval has been named one of the best comic books in the Polish history. In 1990 he created a short form „Upadek bożków” ("Fall of the idols") written by Maciej Parowski that became part of „Durchbruch – aus der Reihe: Comic Art” anthology (a.k.a. „Breakthrough”), together with works created by i.a. Enki Bilal, Neil Gaiman and Moebius. In the meantime Maciej Parowski, chief editor of Nowa Fantastyka, got acquainted with Andrzej Sapkowski, author of the Witcher stories. Building on the book success (first published in 1992) where Bogusław created both the cover and the illustrations, in 1993 he became a first ever person to draw the Witcher himself. In 1993-1995 he authored a series of six comic books giving inspiration for the designs created afterwards and used in CDProjekt video game and Netflix film series.

Then Bogusław went quiet to focus on his creative work for advertising agencies.

In 2009 he was awarded a bronze Medal for Merit to Culture Gloria Artis by the Polish Minister of Culture.

Bogusław came back to comic books in 2011 with a fourth Funky Koval chapter followed by another Kapitan Żbik comic book Tajemnica „Plaży w Pourville” (Mystery of the "Beach in Pourville") in 2013.
