= Komiks =

Komiks (Polish and Tagalog, 'comics') may refer to:

- Komiks (TV series), Philippine television series
- Polish comics
- Philippine comics
