= Wola Biechowska =

- Village
- Location within Poland
- Coordinates: 50°22′54″N 21°0′55″E
- Country: Poland
- Voivodeship: Świętokrzyskie
- County: Busko
- Gmina: Pacanów
- Population: 143

Wola Biechowska [ˈvɔla bjɛˈxɔfska] is a village in the administrative district of Gmina Pacanów, within Busko County, Świętokrzyskie Voivodeship, in south-central Poland. It lies approximately 4 km (2 mi) south-west of Pacanów, 24 km (15 mi) south-east of Busko-Zdrój, and 63 km (39 mi) south-east of the regional capital Kielce.
