= Wójeczka =

- Village
- Location within Poland
- Coordinates: 50°23′58″N 20°57′46″E
- Country: Poland
- Voivodeship: Świętokrzyskie
- County: Busko
- Gmina: Pacanów
- Population: 208

Wójeczka [vuˈjɛt͡ʂka] is a village in the administrative district of Gmina Pacanów, within Busko County, Świętokrzyskie Voivodeship, in south-central Poland. It lies approximately 7 km (4 mi) west of Pacanów, 19 km (12 mi) south-east of Busko-Zdrój, and 59 km (37 mi) south-east of the regional capital Kielce.
