= Polish comics =

- Earliest publications: 1930s
- Publishers: Egmont Polska; Taurus Media; Mucha Comics; Timof i Cisi Wspólnicy; Kultura Gniewu
- Publications: Funky Koval; Jeż Jerzy; Kapitan Żbik; Lil i Put
- Creators: Tadeusz Baranowski; Henryk Chmielewski; Janusz Christa; Szarlota Pawel; Grzegorz Rosiński
- Series: "Koziołek Matołek" "Tytus, Romek i A'Tomek" "Osiedle Swoboda" "Kajko i Kokosz"
- Languages: Polish

Related articles

Polish comics are comics written and produced in Poland. Very few of these comics have been published in languages other than Polish.

== History ==
One of the first and most famous Polish comics was Koziołek Matołek (Matołek the Billy-Goat), created by Kornel Makuszyński (story) and Marian Walentynowicz (art) in 1933. It became a cult classic, still popular today, and is an important part of the canon of Polish children's literature.

In the People's Republic of Poland the term comic (komiks) was discouraged as a "demoralising Western influence," and the terms "graphic stories" (historyjki obrazkowe) or "color books" (kolorowe zeszyty) were preferred instead; they were actually illegal and forbidden from 1947 to 1957. In modern Poland those terms have largely been forgotten, and the formerly discouraged English loanword "comics" (Polish "komiks") is now the main term for the medium.

One of the most notable series created in 1957 (and concluded in 2009) was Tytus, Romek i A'Tomek (eng. Tytus, Romek, and A'Tomek), which became the longest-published and one of the most popular Polish comic book series. Created by Henryk Jerzy Chmielewski (aka Papcio Chmiel), it centers on Romek and A'Tomek, two Boy Scouts, and Tytus de Zoo, a chimpanzee with the ability of human speech.

Over the past few years, the market for comics in Poland has grown rapidly; there is an increasing number of Polish comic books and magazines. Japanese manga has been introduced, and the first Polish manga-style publications have appeared. As throughout the world, webcomics have also become increasingly popular.

== List of popular Polish comics ==
- Bradl
- Brom
- Czaki
- Dollicious
- Emilka Sza
- Funky Koval
- Jeż Jerzy
- Kajtek i Koko
- Kajko i Kokosz
- Kapitan Kloss
- Kapitan Żbik
- Komisarz Żbik
- Koziołek Matołek
- Likwidator
- Lil i Put
- Mikropolis
- Osiedle Swoboda
- Podróż smokiem Diplodokiem
- Przygody Kleksa
- Przygody Małpki Fiki-Miki
- Podziemny front
- Polscy Podróżnicy
- Quo Vadis
- Ratman
- Rewolucje
- Serce Mostu
- Tytus, Romek i A'Tomek
- W.E.
- Wiedźmin
- Wilq - Superbohater
- Yoel
- Życie Jezusa Chrystusa
