= Lil i Put =

Lil i Put 01 – Jak przelać kota do kieliszka (2014)

Lil and Put (Lil i Put) is an ongoing comedy-fantasy Polish comic book series for children created by Maciej Kur (script) and Piotr Bednarczyk (art). The series centres on adventures of two "Małoludy" ("Not-much-people", a Hobbit-like race) named Lil and Put (obvious pun on Liliputs from the novel Gulliver's Travels). The duo are vagabonds travelling the land looking for easy meals and money, usually getting into trouble. The stories are currently published in Nowa Fantastyka magazine.

The series is set in a fantasy pastiche land, full of mythological creatures from well known centaurs, fairies, trolls, dragons, and dwarfs to obscure Slavic mythology utopiec or Leszy as well races created by Kur and Bednarczyk. A notable character is a female elf sorceress named Miksja Iskier who is a college student at travelling wizard school. The humor is similar to Asterix series combining gags for younger and older audience mixing slapstick, puns and zany scenarios with references (both pop-cultural and literary), satirical elements and dark humor targeted at adult readers.

== History ==
The initial story won award for comic series for children in the spirit of Janusz Christa (author of the legendary Polish comic strip series Kajko i Kokosz) in March 2014 and meet with positive reception The first book version, Jak przelać kota do kieliszka? (How do you pour a cat into a drinking glass?) premiered the same year at International Festival of Comics and Games at Łódź. The series is published by Egmont Poland, the largest Polish comic book publishing company. In 2017 one of the stories became part of Polish textbook for 7'th grade children. Since the same year the stories became a regular part of the popular Nowa Fantastyka magazine (known for being the debut place of The Witcher). A lot of stories from the magazine are yet to appear in the book form.

== List of volumes ==
- Lil i Put 01 – Jak przelać kota do kieliszka? (2014) ["How to pour a cat into the drinkig glass?]
- Lil i Put 02 – CHODU!!! (2015) ["RUN!!!]
- Lil i Put 03 – Czarująca Panna Młoda (2017) ["The enchanting bride"]
- Lil i Put 04 - Zawodowi Bumelanci (2019) ["Professional shirkers"]
- Lil i Put 05 - Parada Przypałów (2020) ["The Blunder parade"]
- Lil i Put 06 - Wzloty i Upadki (2023) ["Ups and downs"]

== Characters ==
- Lil - Red hair "małolud". More aggressive and impetuous in nature than his friend and distant cousin Put. He and Put live in the village "Miniatury Wielkie" (Miniatures the Great) but tend to travel a lot to look for easy money and cheap food, usually getting into crazy adventures. On occasion he is shown to be very cheap and going out of his way not to do any unnecessary spending.
- Put - Lil's friend and distant cousin. He is much more calm, friendly, imaginative and carless than Lil. On occasion he is shown to play the guitar. His talent is enjoyed by other Małoludy, but not by other species who find it dreadful.
- Miksja Iskier - An elf and good friend of Lil and Put. A student of magic, who is already very powerful. She is a mix of rational and eccentric and can be impulsive once she loses her patience. She is a satire on Polish students, particularly in stories that center around her school life.
- Kirki - A goblin and Miksja's pet. He acts like a dog and is very devoted to Miksja.
- Ivan Siwy ("Siwy" can be translated as "The gray" or "The white" referring to the color of his beard.) - A dwarf and leader of a group of Troll hunters. He is a ruthless pettifogger who kills anything he doesn't like, but tends to justify his actions with nonsensical rationality, making him look insane. He hates elves the most and is at odds with Miksja, who he constantly tries to slay. He alternates between being a villain and being helpful to Lil and Put (the later usually when Miksja isn't around). The other members of his team are dwarfs named Borys, Bupert and Marcel.
- Świętopełk - A "dodo bird shepherd". A lazy friend of Lil and Put from their home village, who talks in nonsensical jargon that is parody of many Polish dialects. Sometimes things he says prove to be true or brilliant, while at other times it's just backwards logic. He is a parody of Polish rednecks.
- Kieszonka (Pocket) - Lil's sister, who is a professional thief and a burglar which in Lil and Put's world seem to treated like any other profession. She is cynical, manipulative and tends to make sarcastic remarks toward her brother.
- Nicola Flamel - An alchemist and a friend of Miksja who runs an alchemy shop. Lil and Put often go to her to buy helpful potions and artifacts (as well Miksja who has little talent in potion making). She is shown to be a brilliant scientist but is clueless in anything outside of her craft. Her name pays homage to actual alchemist Nicolas Flamel.
