= Biechów, Busko County =

Biechów
- Village
- Location within Poland
- Coordinates: 50°22′45″N 20°59′36″E
- Country: Poland
- Voivodeship: Świętokrzyskie
- County: Busko
- Gmina: Pacanów
- Population: 371

Biechów [ˈbjɛxuf] is a village in the administrative district of Gmina Pacanów, within Busko County, Świętokrzyskie Voivodeship, in south-central Poland. It lies approximately 5 km (3 mi) south-west of Pacanów, 22 km (14 mi) south-east of Busko-Zdrój, and 62 km (39 mi) south-east of the regional capital Kielce.
