= Książnice, Świętokrzyskie Voivodeship =

Książnice
- Village
- Location within Poland
- Coordinates: 50°23′57″N 21°3′36″E
- Country: Poland
- Voivodeship: Świętokrzyskie
- County: Busko
- Gmina: Pacanów
- Population: 323

Książnice [kɕɔ̃ʐˈnit͡sɛ] is a village in the administrative district of Gmina Pacanów, within Busko County, Świętokrzyskie Voivodeship, in south-central Poland. It lies approximately 1 km (1 mi) east of Pacanów, 26 km (16 mi) east of Busko-Zdrój, and 63 km (39 mi) south-east of the regional capital Kielce.
