= The Witcher (Prószyński i S-ka) =

1993–1995 Polish comic books series

- Cover of Geralt, second book of the series. Published in Komiks 9/93 (27), 1993
- Created by: Maciej Parowski; Bogusław Polch; Andrzej Sapkowski

Publication information
- Publisher: Prószyński i S-ka
- Original language: Polish
- Genre: Fantasy
- Publication date: 1993–1995
- Number of issues: 6

The Witcher (Polish: Wiedźmin) is a six-issue comic book series, written by Maciej Parowski and illustrated by Bogusław Polch, mostly adapting Andrzej Sapkowski's early stories about The Witcher. It was released in Poland from 1993 to 1995 in the Komiks magazine published by Prószyński i S-ka. The comics were the first attempt to portray The Witcher universe outside the novels. While the series inititially received mixed reviews, it became more popular later, and is accepted as an important milestone in the development of The Witcher's franchise, as well as setting the visual style of the universe.

== Publishing history ==
From 1993 to 1995, Andrzej Sapkowski's stories about The Witcher were adapted into six comic books by Maciej Parowski and Sapkowski (story) and Bogusław Polch (art). The series was released in the Komiks magazine published by Prószyński i S-ka.

The six books are:

- Droga bez powrotu (A Road with No Return) – Based on the short story "Droga, z której się nie wraca". Published in Komiks 8/93 (26), 1993.
- Geralt – Based on the short story "Wiedźmin" ("The Witcher"). Published in Komiks 9/93 (27), 1993.
- Mniejsze zło (The Lesser Evil) – Based on the short story with the same title. Published in Komiks 10/93 (28), 1993.
- Ostatnie życzenie (The Last Wish) – Based on the short story with the same title. Published in Komiks 2/94 (30), 1994.
- Granica możliwości (The Bounds of Reason) – Based on the short story with the same title. Published in Komiks 1/95 (31), 1995.
- Zdrada (The Betrayal) – Based on an "unused idea for a short story", consulted with and inspired by Sapkowski, this is the one and only original story (not based on previously published short stories). It features a young Geralt, and is set before most other works. Published in Komiks 2/95 (32), 1995.

The series was later released in two collected volumes, with each volume collecting three stories, in 2001. An English translation of series was released by Dark Horse Comics in 2025 as a single volume, titled The Witcher: Classic Collection.

== Reception ==
At first, the comics gained only a lackluster following and mixed reviews; it would not be until the television and video game version of the 2000s that The Witcher franchise became more widely recognized. Some blamed it for the demise of the Komiks magazine, which ceased publication in 1995, after publishing the last book of The Witcher series. Many readers were disappointed with the art, saying that the world and characters drawn by Polch were "not as they imagined it". Technical issue with print quality and divergences from the original plot of the short stories were also criticized. Some compared the series, usually unfavorably, with the previous, well-received original series from Polch and Parowski, Funky Koval.

However, in time, the series gained a "second life", and become more positively reviewed as a pioneering endeavour—being the first visual representation of The Witcher universe—which, "while flawed, had many successful episodes and ideas". Later critics noted that much of the earlier criticism of Polch's art style was unfair, as Sapkowski's description of characters, including of Geralt of Rivia himself, were generally vague, and Polch had the difficult task to use what sparse descriptions there were and then meet the visions of the world as vividly imagined by the book readers. Polch's visual portrayal of Geralt, while initially controversial, became the basis for latter representation of him and the world of The Witcher in other media.

== See also ==
- The Witcher (Dark Horse Comics)
