= Zborówek, Świętokrzyskie Voivodeship =

Zborówek
- Village
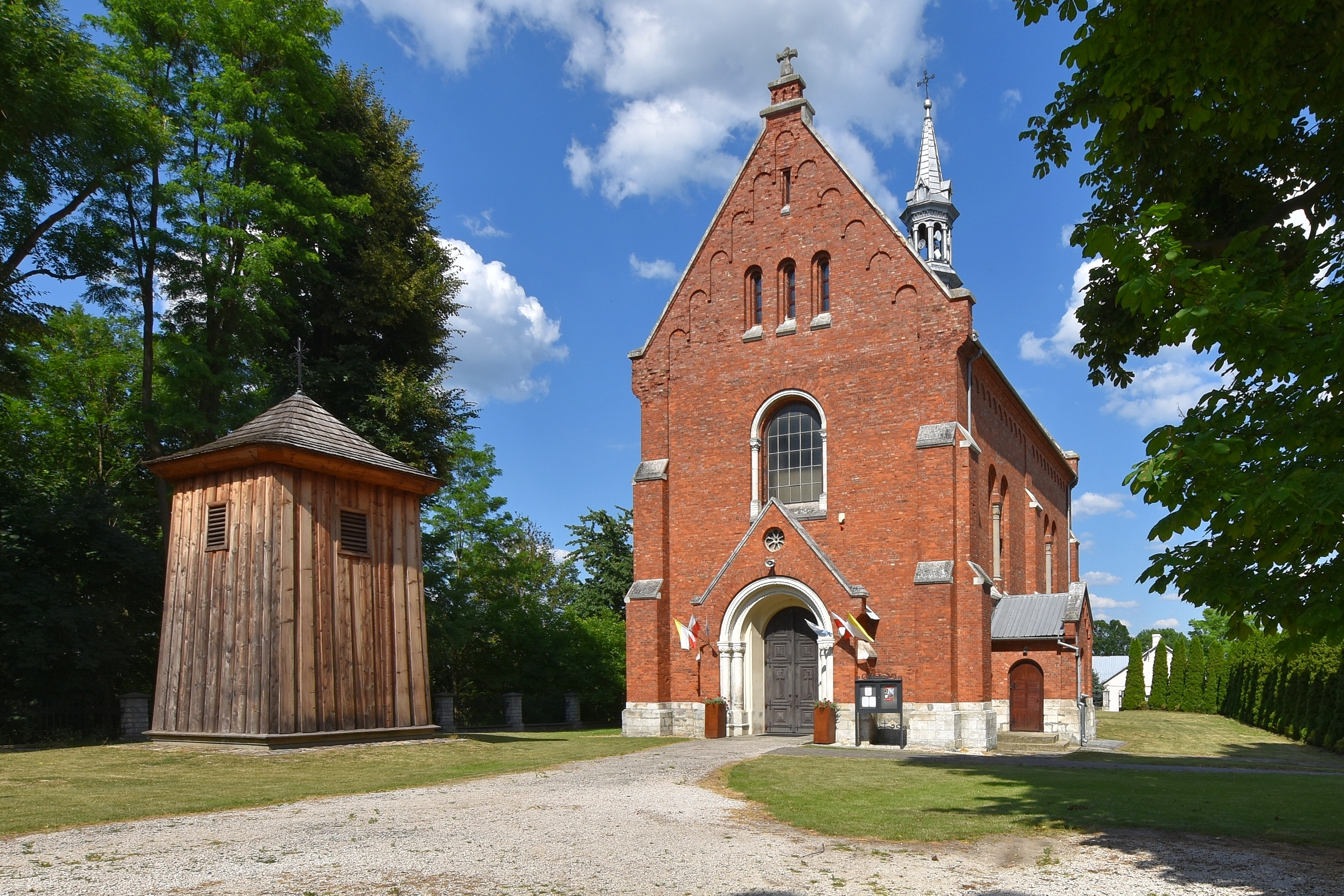
- Catholic church

- Location within Poland
- Coordinates: 50°23′43″N 21°6′9″E
- Country: Poland
- Voivodeship: Świętokrzyskie
- County: Busko
- Gmina: Pacanów
- Population: 155

Zborówek [zbɔˈruvɛk] is a village in the administrative district of Gmina Pacanów, within Busko County, Świętokrzyskie Voivodeship, in south-central Poland. It lies approximately 4 km (2 mi) east of Pacanów, 29 km (18 mi) east of Busko-Zdrój, and 65 km (40 mi) south-east of the regional capital Kielce.
