= Battle of Komorów =

- Part of the January Uprising
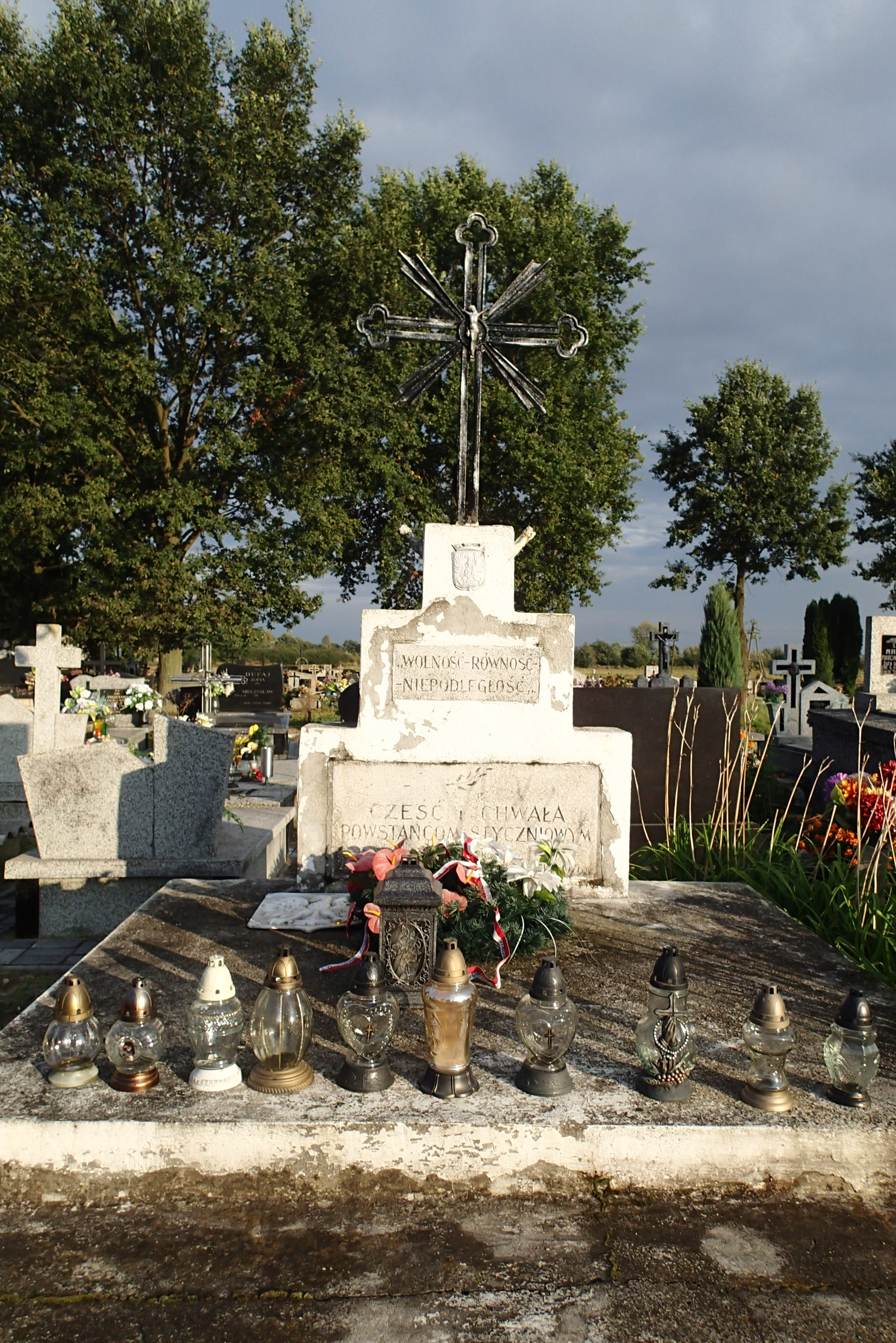
- Mass grave of Polish insurgents fallen in the Battle of Komorów at the cemetery in Beszowa
Date	20 June 1863
Location	Komorów
Result	Russian victory

Belligerents
(Poland) Polish insurgents	Russian Empire

Commanders and leaders
Zygmunt Jordan	

The Battle of Komorów, one of many clashes of the January Uprising, took place on 20 June 1863 near the village of Komorów, which at that time belonged to Russian-controlled Congress Poland. An insurgent unit under Zygmunt Jordan clashed with a detachment of the Imperial Russian Army. The battle ended in Russian victory.

On 20 June 1863 insurgent unit of Zygmunt Jordan crossed the Vistula, the river which marked the border between Galicia (Austrian Partition of Poland) and Congress Poland (Russian Partition). Polish insurgents were divided into two columns. One was attacked by Russian infantry near the village of Gace. Several Poles died, and the survivors retreated to Galicia.

Second column (350 infantry and 50 cavalry) clashed with Russians in the folwark of Komorów. Since the detachment of the Imperial Russian Army was much stronger and better equipped than the insurgents, Polish forces were pushed back towards the Vistula, and then to Galicia. The battle was terminated due to a thunderstorm.

All together, some 200 rebels were killed; some by the Russians, others drowned in the Vistula. 72 rebels were buried in a mass grave at a cemetery in Beszowa.

== Sources ==
- Stefan Kieniewicz: Powstanie styczniowe. Warszawa: Państwowe Wydawnictwo Naukowe, 1983. ISBN 83-01-03652-4.
