= Gmina Pacanów =

Gmina Pacanów Pacanów Commune
- Gmina
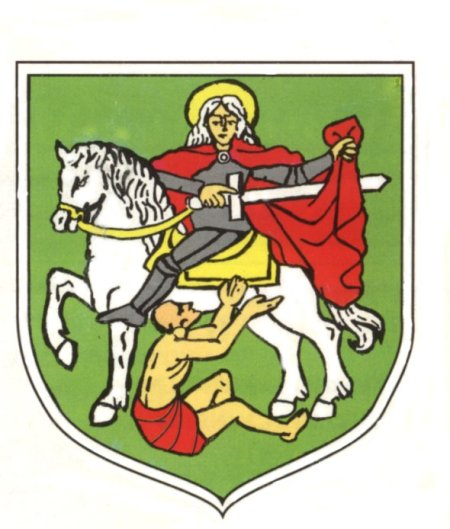
- Coat of arms
- Interactive map of Gmina Pacanów
- Coordinates (Pacanów): 50°24′N 21°3′E
- Country: Poland
- Voivodeship: Świętokrzyskie
- County: Busko
- Seat: Pacanów

Area
  - Total: 123.89 km^{2} (47.83 sq mi)

Population (2006)
  - Total: 7,897
  - Density: 63.74/km^{2} (165.1/sq mi)
- Website: http://www.pacanow.pl

Gmina Pacanów is a rural gmina (administrative district) in Busko County, Świętokrzyskie Voivodeship, in south-central Poland. Its seat is the town of Pacanów, which lies approximately 25 kilometres (16 mi) east of Busko-Zdrój and 62 km (39 mi) south-east of the regional capital Kielce.

The gmina covers an area of 123.89 square kilometres (47.8 sq mi), and as of 2006 its total population is 7,897.

== Villages ==
Gmina Pacanów contains the villages and settlements of Biechów, Biskupice, Chrzanów, Grabowica, Karsy Dolne, Karsy Duże, Karsy Małe, Kępa Lubawska, Kółko Żabieckie, Komorów, Książnice, Kwasów, Niegosławice, Oblekoń, Pacanów, Podwale, Rataje Karskie, Rataje Słupskie, Słupia, Sroczków, Trzebica, Wójcza, Wójeczka, Wola Biechowska, Żabiec, Zborówek, Zborówek Nowy and Żółcza.

== Neighbouring gminas ==
Gmina Pacanów is bordered by the gminas of Łubnice, Mędrzechów, Nowy Korczyn, Oleśnica, Solec-Zdrój, Stopnica and Szczucin.
