= The Gods from Outer Space =

German-Polish comic book series

- Cover of Polish edition of The Gods from Outer Space, volume 5 (Zagłada Wielkiej Wyspy), depicting one of the main characters (Ais).
- Created by: Arnold Mostowicz; Alfred Górny; Bogusław Polch

Publication information
- Publisher: Bastei Verlag (Germany)
- Original language: Polish
- Genre: Science fiction
- Publication date: 1978–1982

Reprints
- The series has been reprinted, at least in part, in German, English, Swedish, Czech, Spanish, and French.

The Gods from Outer Space (German: Die Götter aus dem All, Polish: Bogowie z kosmosu; also Według Ericha von Dänikena) is a science fiction comic book series, published in the years 1978–1982 by German publishing house Bastei Verlag, written and drawn by Polish artists. The writers were Arnold Mostowicz and Alfred Górny, and the artist was Bogusław Polch. The story was based on the views of Erich von Däniken, a proponent of the fringe theory that in ancient times the Earth was visited by ancient astronauts – representatives of an extraterrestrial civilization.

The series was translated into at least twelve languages, and sold several million copies. It has been widely popular in Poland, where it is considered a cult classic. A collected volume, published in Poland in 2015, has received generally positive reviews; in particular, nearly all reviewers highly praised the quality of Polch's art. It has been called "One of Polch’s most recognized series" as well as "one of the most famous and successful Polish comic book series".

== Development ==
In the late 1970s Polish writer and publisher, Alfred Górny, became interested in the ideas of Erich von Däniken and started publishing his books in Poland. Shortly afterward he started a collaboration with the German publisher Econ Verlag (and later Bastei Verlag) on a comic book series, offering Polish writers and illustrators for the joint venture. Górny collaborated on the scripts with another Polish writer and a fellow enthusiast of Däniken's theories, Arnold Mostowicz, and for the illustrator they chose Bogusław Polch. (Note: According to Szatko, Górski is credited as a co-author due to being the organizer of the project, but his input towards the script itself was very limited, making Mostowicz the primary author.) The series was published in eight books in Germany, from 1978 to 1982. It was also published in Poland, from 1982 to 1990, by Krajowa Agencja Wydawnicza; however in 1990, after publishing volume 7, KAW went through reorganization and ceased publication of the series. The final volume 8 would not be published in Poland until the early 2000s. While most attribute the delay of the publication of the last volume in Poland to accidental, unfortunate timing, it has also been suggested that the controversial theme of the last volumes, dealing with Biblical history, might have been an additional factor in the delay, as the publishers might have wanted to avoid antagonising the Catholic Church, which had become resurgent in Polish politics.

In the UK the first four books were published by Methuen/Magnet Publishing as The Gods from Outer Space series, around the same time as the German edition. Six volumes were published in Spain under the title Los Dioses del universo (1979–1981). In France the series was called Ceux venus de l'espace, but only a single book was published in 1979; the same for Sweden (1978) and the Czech Republic (1990).

In total, the series was published in at least twelve languages. As of the early 2000s the Polish editions had sold over 1.5 million copies of the books from the series, and as of 2015, five million copies sold worldwide were reported.

== Plot ==
In prehistoric times, an expedition from the distant planet (called Des in the Polish edition; Delos in German) comes to Earth on behalf of the Great Brain, an immortal entity and a genius, the highest authority on Des (Delos). Its commander is a woman named Ais, who aims to find beings for an uplift process. The first attempts turn out to be unsuccessful, as the alien base in the Andes is destroyed by a volcanic eruption. However, thanks to the help of members of the next two expeditions, Enes and Rama, the work on the Big Island, a.k.a. Atlantis, is continued. Ais and her crew face many other challenges, most notably internal problems, caused first by the rebellion of one of the deputies, and then by open warfare led by the non-Delosiani Dr. Satham, a scrupulous scientist and his henchmen.

While the uplift experiment seems to progress, eventually the Great Brain, the highest authority on Des (Delos), decides to stop and destroy the work of Ais and her colleagues. However, Ais and some of her subordinates questioned (→ reflection) the strange order and refuse to abandon the uplift (whether the command actually came directly from the Great Brain is not known. It contradicted the first order - Uplift of the humans!). In retribution, Atlantis is sunk by a targeted meteorite, but the uplifted humans, thanks to the help of the rebel scientists (Ais), escape and settle in other areas. For this insubordination, Ais is later relieved of her position and is assigned to other tasks. Her place is taken by her daughter, Aistar, who continues to observe the civilization created by her ancestor while continuing the fight against Dr. Satham. Later volumes chronicle the intervention of Aistar and Satham into early human civilisations, such as Ancient Egypt and Mesopotamia, with figures such as Marduk, Nimrod, Rama and Enoch being portrayed as extraterrestrials or their collaborators.

== Books ==
The series consists of eight albums. The titles of several albums in German and Polish are different; in addition, while the German series had a series title Die Götter aus dem All (lit. Gods from space); no such title was provided for the Polish first edition, which was informally known as "According to Erich von Däniken" (Według Ericha von Dänikena, based on a subtitle appearing on the covers of the Polish edition); other names used in Poland include the "Däniken series" or the "Ais series". After the reprints of 2003 and 2015, the series also became known in Poland as "Expedition", or "Gods from space" (Ekspedycja or Bogowie z kosmosu, the former being the name of the collected edition, and the latter, a subtitle appended to the 2015 collected edition).

1. Descent in the Andes (Landung in den Anden 1978, Lądowanie w Andach 1982)
2. Atlantis, men and monsters (Atlantis – Experimente mit Menschen und Monstern 1978, Ludzie i potwory 1984)
3. The War of the Chariots (Krieg der Feuerwagen – Report einer Invasion 1978, Walka o planetę 1985). The Polish title translates as the Battle for the Planet.
4. Revolt of the Titans (Revolte der Titanen 1978, Bunt olbrzymów 1986)
5. The Fall of Atlantis – The Revenge of the Gods (German title); Destruction of the Great Island (Polish title), (Der Untergang von Atlantis – Die Rache der Götter 1978, Zagłada Wielkiej Wyspy 1987)
6. When Sodom and Gomorrah Died (German title); Planet under Control (Polish title) (Als Sodom und Gomorrha starben 1978, Planeta pod kontrolą 1990)
7. The Secret of the Pyramid (Das Geheimnis der Pyramide 1982, Tajemnica piramidy 1990)
8. When the Sun Stood Still (German title) The Last Order (Polish title) (Als die Sonne still stand 1982, Ostatni rozkaz, 1999 (Note: Not published in Poland in the album form due to the bankruptcy of KAW. Fragments were published in the KRON magazine; later published in the collected editions of 2003 and 2015.))

== Reception ==
Igor Soszyński discussing the history of the series in the early 2000s called it "one of the most famous and successful Polish comic book series", praising it for a well designed world, engaging story and the quality of Polch's drawings, criticizing only the characters for usually not being sufficiently developed.

When the collected edition (Ekspedycja. Bogowie z Kosmosu) was published in Poland in 2015, it received a flurry of reviews. Marcin Kamiński, writing for onet.pl, said that the series is "one of the biggest successes in the history of the Polish comics". He noted that re-reading the series in his 40s, he still considered it an enjoyable science-fiction adventure tale, well grounded in "Däniken's lore", but found a number of plots and characters rather immature. Regarding the 2015 edition itself, he suggested that the new cover has been criticized by a number of fans, and that the edition could use more supplementary material besides a single interview with Polch and a few sketches.

Reviewing this volume for Esensja, Paweł Ciołkiewicz wrote that the series has a mostly cohesive plot, although sometimes it tries too forcefully to "educate" about Däniken's theories, to the detriment of the overall story. He praises the "gallery of interesting characters", most notably the "beautiful, brave and extremely intelligent Ais", and several other protagonists, although he criticized the antagonists like Satham, who according to the reviewer have "unrealized potential" but in the end, are too stereotypical to be taken seriously. He concluded that the undeniably best and near perfect aspect of the series is the quality of Polch's artwork.

Patryk Wolski, reviewing this for Głos Kultury, was more critical, summarizing the plot as acceptable but not deep, noting that the work was targeting young adults, and that mature readers who are looking for something more than a mix of action with Däniken's theories will likely be unsatisfied.

Mirosław Skrzydło in a review for naEKRANIE called the series "one of the most recognizable Polish comic book series", and commended the story for a masterful mixing of various historical themes with science-fiction elements, although he noted that the plot is quite predictable and repeats itself over a number of volumes. Skrzydło also praises the artwork, saying that in the series, Polch "climbed the peak of art", and even calls the series a "national treasure".

Maciej Szatko, reviewing the volume for Gildia.pl, observed that outside of the underwhelming new cover art, the volume is very successful on many levels.

Balint Lengyel in a review for polter.pl praised Polch's quality artwork, as well as the story for its epic character and successful integration of a number of science and religious ideas, creating an original universe for the adventures that follows; however, Lengyel criticized the characters as mostly one-dimensional, "good versus evil", and argued that the volume would benefit from additional supplementary content.

The edition was also reviewed for Paradoks by two reviewers. First, in 2015 by Przemysław Mazur, who said that the comic book series was at some point endorsed by von Däniken himself. According to Mazur, while the plot is acceptable, but not particularly revolutionary, the best element of the series are the quality drawings of Polch. He also noted that the edition is already a commercial success, and that previous books – both the originals and the 2003 edition – have already become prized collector items, "reaching extravagant prices" on the secondary market. In 2020 it was reviewed by Miłosz Koziński, who observed that the series was much stronger in its first few volumes than near the end, where it became too repetitive and focused on von Däniken's theories. He praised the artwork, calling Polch a "great artist", and concluded that the series is still worth reading today, not just due to its historical or sentimental value, but just as a piece of solid, if imperfect, literature – occasionally naïve, but almost always engaging and enjoyable.

In 2020 a reviewer for We Are the Mutants praised the series for the "Polch’s lyrically beautiful artwork", and opined that the series plot makes more sense than "von Däniken’s reactionary gobbledegook". The reviewer also wrote that while Ais and Aistar are the only women characters with any significant spoken roles, opening the series to criticism of being sexist, they are at the same time very strong female characters, and de facto leads of many stories.
