= Zborówek Nowy =

- Village
- Location within Poland
- Coordinates: 50°24′26″N 21°05′00″E
- Country: Poland
- Voivodeship: Świętokrzyskie
- County: Busko
- Gmina: Pacanów
- Population: 181

Zborówek Nowy [zbɔˈruvɛk ˈnɔvɨ] is a village in the administrative district of Gmina Pacanów, within Busko County, Świętokrzyskie Voivodeship, in south-central Poland.
