= Niegosławice, Busko County =

Niegosławice
- Village
- Location within Poland
- Coordinates: 50°23′58″N 21°01′33″E
- Country: Poland
- Voivodeship: Świętokrzyskie
- County: Busko
- Gmina: Pacanów
- Population: 161

Niegosławice [ɲɛɡɔswaˈvit͡sɛ] is a village in the administrative district of Gmina Pacanów, within Busko County, Świętokrzyskie Voivodeship, in south-central Poland.
