= Kapitan Żbik =

Polish comic book series

Captain Jan Żbik

Kapitan Żbik (English: Captain Żbik) is a Polish comic book series published in years 1967–1982.

There were 53 comics about Żbik released. A sequel, entitled Komisarz Żbik (English: Commissioner Żbik), was started in 2006. The title hero is police commissioner Michał Maciej Żbik, grandson of Jan Żbik, who is now a retired police colonel.

== List of Kapitan Żbik comics ==
| Title | I release | II release | III release | Artist |
|---|---|---|---|---|
| Ryzyko (1) | 1967 | | | Z. Sobala |
| Ryzyko (2) | 1967 | | | Z. Sobala |
| Ryzyko (3) | 1967 | | | Z. Sobala |
| Dziękuje kapitanie | 1968 | | | J. Rocki |
| Diadem Tamary | 1968 | | | G. Rosiński |
| Wzywam 0-21 | 1968 | | | Z. Sobala |
| Śledzić Fiata 03-17 WE | 1968 | | | M. Wiśniewski |
| Tajemnica ikony | 1969 | | | G. Rosiński |
| Kryształowe okruchy | 1970 | | | Z. Sobala |
| Zapalniczka z pozytywką (1) | 1970 | 1974 | | G. Rosiński |
| Spotkanie w "Kukerite" (2) | 1970 | 1974 | | G. Rosiński |
| Podwójny mat (3) | 1970 | 1974 | | G. Rosiński |
| Porwanie (4) | 1970 | 1974 | | G. Rosiński |
| Błękitna serpentyna (5) | 1970 | 1974 | | G. Rosiński |
| Kocie oko | 1970 | | | Z. Sobala |
| Czarna Nefretete | 1970 | | | G. Rosiński |
| Złoty Mauritius | 1970 | 1980 | 2002 | B. Polch |
| Czarny parasol (1) | 1971 | | | A. Kamiński |
| Studnia (2) | 1971 | | | A. Kamiński |
| Strzał przed północą | 1971 | | | Z. Sobala |
| Człowiek za burtą (1) | 1971 | | | G. Rosiński |
| Gotycka komnata (2) | 1971 | | | G. Rosiński |
| Nocna wizyta (1) | 1972 | 1980 | 2002 | B. Polch |
| Wąż z rubinowym oczkiem (2) | 1972 | 1980 | 2002 | B. Polch |
| Pogoń za lwem (3) | 1972 | 1980 | 2002 | B. Polch |
| Salto śmierci (4) | 1972 | 1982 | 2002 | B. Polch |
| Skoda TW 6163 | 1972 | | | G. Rosiński |
| Wieloryb z peryskopem (1) | 1973 | 1978 | | J. Wróblewski |
| Wiszący rower (2) | 1973 | 1978 | | J. Wróblewski |
| Tajemniczy nurek (3) | 1973 | 1978 | | J. Wróblewski |
| Na zakręcie (1) | 1973 | 1981 | 2002 | B. Polch |
| Niewygodny świadek (2) | 1975 | 1981 | 2002 | B. Polch |
| Dwanaście kanistrów (1) | 1973 | | | J. Wróblewski |
| Zakręt śmierci (2) | 1974 | | | J. Wróblewski |
| W pułapce (3) | 1974 | | | J. Wróblewski |
| Kryptonim "Walizka" | 1974 | 1978 | | J. Wróblewski |
| Gdzie jest jasnowłosa? | 1974 | 1978 | | J. Wróblewski |
| SP-139-WA zaginął! | 1975 | 1978 | | J. Wróblewski |
| Wyzwanie dla silniejszego | 1975 | 1978 | | J. Wróblewski |
| Wodorosty i pasożyty (1) | 1976 | 1977 | | J. Wróblewski |
| Wodorosty i pasożyty (2) | 1976 | 1977 | | J. Wróblewski |
| Jaskinia zbójców | 1976 | 1981 | | J. Wróblewski |
| Kto zabił Jacka? (1) | 1976 | 1979 | | J. Wróblewski |
| Tajemnicze światło (2) | 1976 | 1980 | | J. Wróblewski |
| W potrzasku (3) | 1977 | 1980 | | J. Wróblewski |
| Zerwana sieć | 1977 | 1981 | | J. Wróblewski |
| Granatowa cortina (1) | 1978 | | | J. Wróblewski |
| Skok przez trzy granice (2) | 1979 | | | J. Wróblewski |
| Zatrzymać niebieskiego fiata (3) | 1980 | | | J. Wróblewski |
| "St. Marie" wychodzi w morze... (1) | 1982 | | | J. Wróblewski |
| Nie odebrany telegram (2) | 1981 | | | J. Wróblewski |
| Ślady w lesie (3) | 1982 | | | J. Wróblewski |
| Smutny finał (4) | 1982 | | | J. Wróblewski |
