= Marian Walentynowicz =

Polish architect and graphic artist

- Marian Walentynowicz, 1932, photo by Stanisław Brzozowski
- Born: Marian Walentynowicz; 20 August 1896; St Petersburg, Russian Empire
- Died: 26 August 1967 (aged 71); Warsaw, Poland
- Education: Warsaw Polytechnic
- Known for: Architecture, graphic art, children's comics, war correspondent
- Notable work: Koziołek Matołek

Marian Walentynowicz (born 20 August 1896 in Saint Petersburg, Russian Empire, died 26 August 1967 in Warsaw, Poland) was a Polish graphic artist, architect, teacher, writer and comics artist in Poland.

He is probably best known for his collaboration as illustrator with Kornel Makuszyński in their creation of Koziołek Matołek, a popular classic children's series about a billy goat.

== Life ==
Walentynowicz studied Architecture at the Warsaw Polytechnic. During the 1930s he taught at the Women's Architectural Academy in Warsaw (Żeńska Szkoła Architektury im. S. Noakowskiego). From the 1920s onwards he worked as an illustrator for various Warsaw publications. During the Second World War, he was the war correspondent attached to General Stanisław Maczek's First Panzer division of the Polish Armed Forces in the West. While with the Polish Forces, Walentynowicz stayed in London prior to the Normandy landings. The army had a quandary what to do with a Lieutenant who was a qualified architect, with insufficient knowledge of war craft. 'Make me a general', he suggested laconically and promptly was turned into a journalist. His war memoirs were published as Wojna bez patosu, War without pathos in 1969.

== Graphic legacy ==
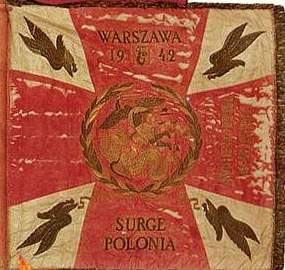
1st Independent Parachute Brigade (Poland) Standard, designed by Walentynowicz

He designed the emblem of the Independent Polish Parachute Brigade as well as the awards for the Brigade's heroes. He was a prolific book illustrator. Among his jacket designs was the wartime edition of Józef Kisielewski's Ziemia gromadzi prochy, The Earth Gathers Dust. His children's book illustrations include:

With Kornel Makuszyński:

- 1933 120 przygód Koziołek Matołek (120 adventures of Koziołek Matołek), on account of the 120 drawings, each with a caption in a quatrain.

With other authors:

- Walenty Pompka na wojnie, a comic book with text by Ryszard Kiersnowski, published in 1957 by the weekly review for young people, Przygoda, in a series of 49 whole page comic strips.
- Przygody profesora Biedronki – Profesor i Ptaki, 1956, The Adventures of Professor Ladybird

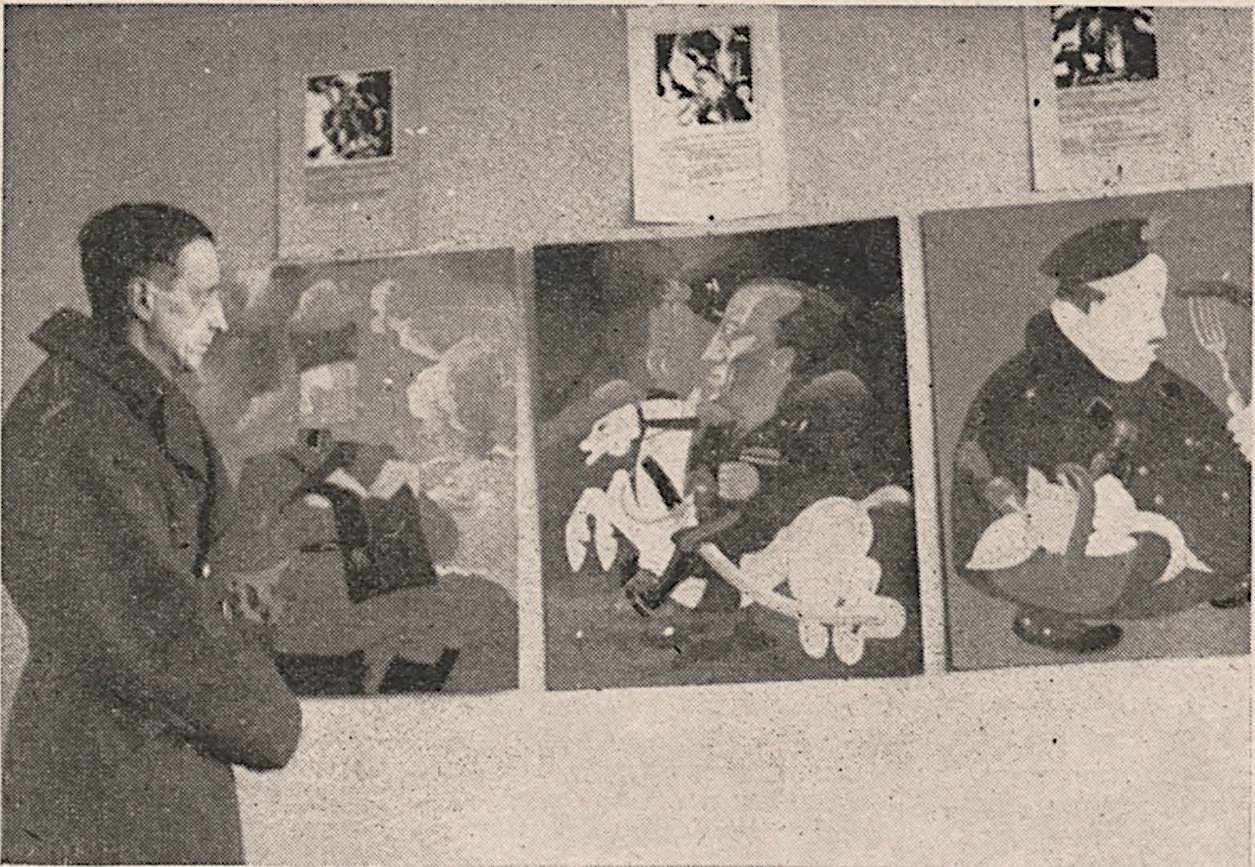
1941 Marian Walentynowicz at an exhibition of his drawings in Scotland

Some of the stories have been turned into well loved TV and feature film animations.

== Literary output ==
Aside from his collaborations with other authors, Marian Walentynowicz also published his own work:

- Ze sztucerem przez Czarny Ląd, stories published in the review Przygoda
- Wojna bez patosu 1969, war reminiscences

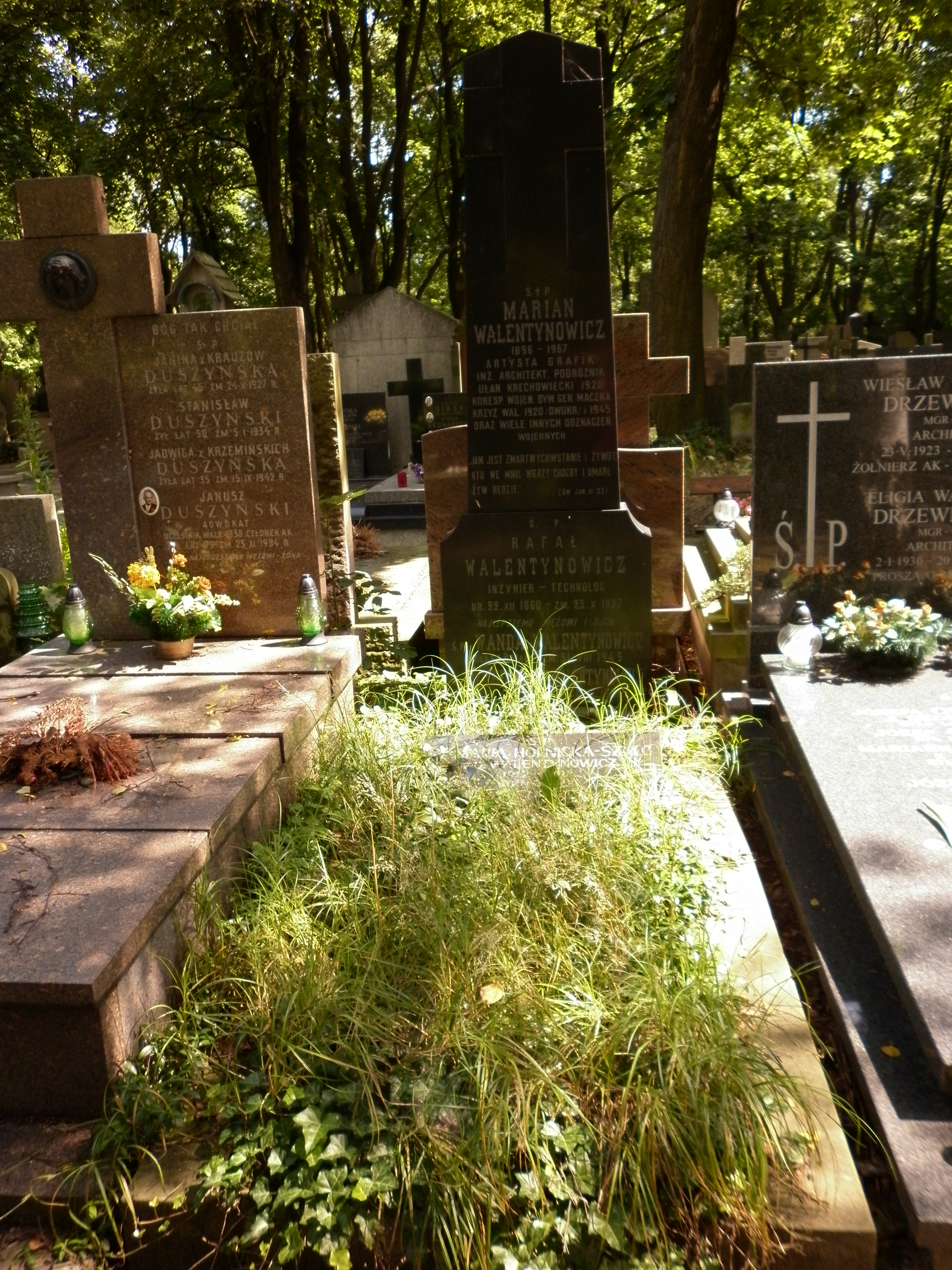
Grave of Marian Walentynowicz at Powązkowski Cemetery Warsaw

== See also ==
- Pacanów
- List of Polish people
- The Adventures of Tintin

== Bibliography ==
Koziolek Matolek

With Kornel Makuszyński:

- 1933 120 przygód Koziołka Matołka (120 adventures of Koziołek Matołek) on account of the 120 drawings, each with a caption in a quatrain.
- 1933 Druga księga przygód Koziołka Matołka, The Second Book of Koziołek Matołek's Adventures
- 1934 Trzecia księga przygód Koziołka Matołka, The Third Book of Koziołek Matołek's Adventures
- 1934 Czwarta księga przygód Koziołka Matołka, The Fourth Book of Koziołek Matołek's Adventures
- 1935 Awantury i wybryki małej małpki Fiki-Miki, Rows and japes of the little monkey, Fiki-Miki
- 1936 Fiki-Miki dalsze dzieje, kto to czyta, ten się śmieje, More Fiki-Miki Adventures, all readers laugh
- 1937 O wawelskim smoku, About the Wawel Dragon
- 1938 Wanda leży w naszej ziemi, Wanda lies in our earth
- 1938 Na nic płacze, na nic krzyki, koniec przygód Fiki-Miki, No Use Crying and Screaming, this is the End of Fiki-Miki's Adventures
- 1960 Legendy krakowskie (Collected edition, Legends of Kraków, about the Wawel Dragon and Wanda)
- 1964 Awantury i wybryki małej małpki Fiki-Miki, complete edition
- 1969 Przygody Koziołka Matołka, Collected edition of Koziołek Matołek's Adventures
