= Kornel Makuszyński =

Polish writer (1884–1953)

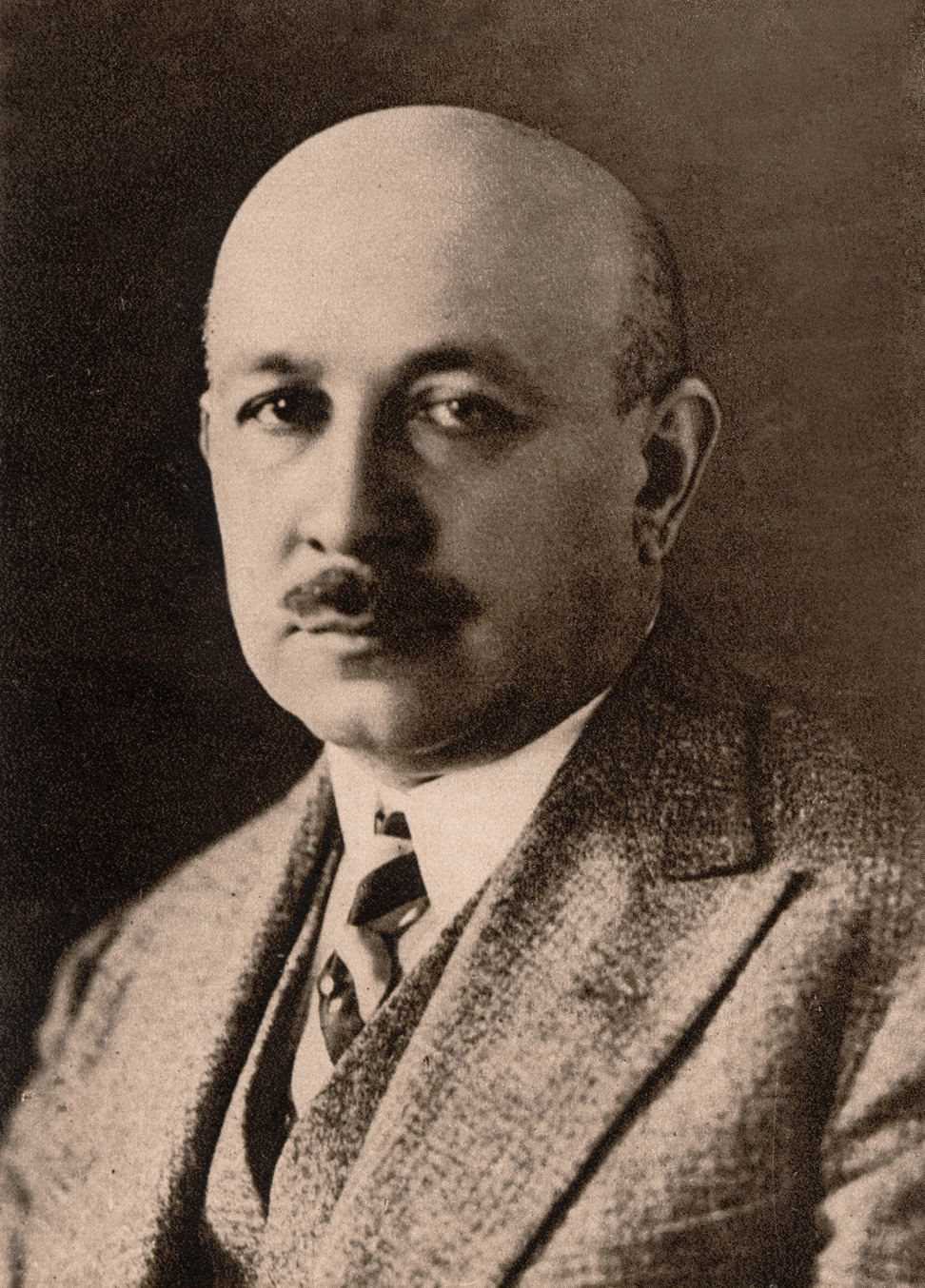
- Born: 8 January 1884; Stryi, Galicia, Austro-Hungarian Empire (now Stryi, Ukraine)
- Died: 31 July 1953 (aged 69); Zakopane, Polish People's Republic (now Poland)
- Writing career
- Notable awards: Polish Academy of Literature (Gold Laurel)

Kornel Makuszyński (Polish pronunciation: [ˈkɔrnɛl makuˈʂɨɲskʲi]; 8 January 1884 – 31 July 1953) was a Polish writer of children's and youth literature. He was an elected member of the prestigious Polish Academy of Literature in the interwar Poland.

== Life ==
Makuszyński was born in Stryj in the Austrian Partition of Poland (now in Ukraine) to Edward and Julia née Ogonowska. He attended the Jan Długosz gymnasium in Lviv (Polish: Lwów). While in school he wrote occasional poetry (he started writing at the age of 14). Makuszyński had his first poem published in 1902 in the newspaper Słowo Polskie (Polish Word), for which he soon became a theatrical critic. He studied language and literature at both the University of Lviv (then Jan Kazimierz University in Lwów, Poland) and in Paris. He was evacuated to Kiev (Ukrainian: Kyiv) in 1915, where he ran the Polish Theatre and was the chairman of the Polish writers and journalist community. He moved to Warsaw in 1918, and became a writer.

His children's books, particularly the series about the goat, Koziołek Matołek, illustrated by Marian Walentynowicz, have an enduring popularity in Poland, whatever the sharp changes in the country's fortunes and its political system. They have been translated into many other languages. Among others, they are very popular in Israel, where Polish Jewish immigrants since the 1920s and 1930s took care to have many of them translated into Hebrew and introduced them to their own children.

Makuszyński was temporarily blacklisted right after World War II by his chief rival at the Polish Academy of Literature and later, communist apparatchik Wincenty Rzymowski, a plagiarist. Makuszyński died in 1953 in Zakopane, where he lived from 1945. He was buried at the Peksowe Brzysko cemetery in Zakopane. There is a museum dedicated to him in the city, originally launched by his widow, Janina.

In 2018, at a ceremony held at the Royal Castle in Warsaw on the 100th anniversary of Poland regaining its independence, Polish President Andrzej Duda posthumously conferred the country's highest distinction, the Order of the White Eagle, upon 25 distinguished Poles including Makuszyński.

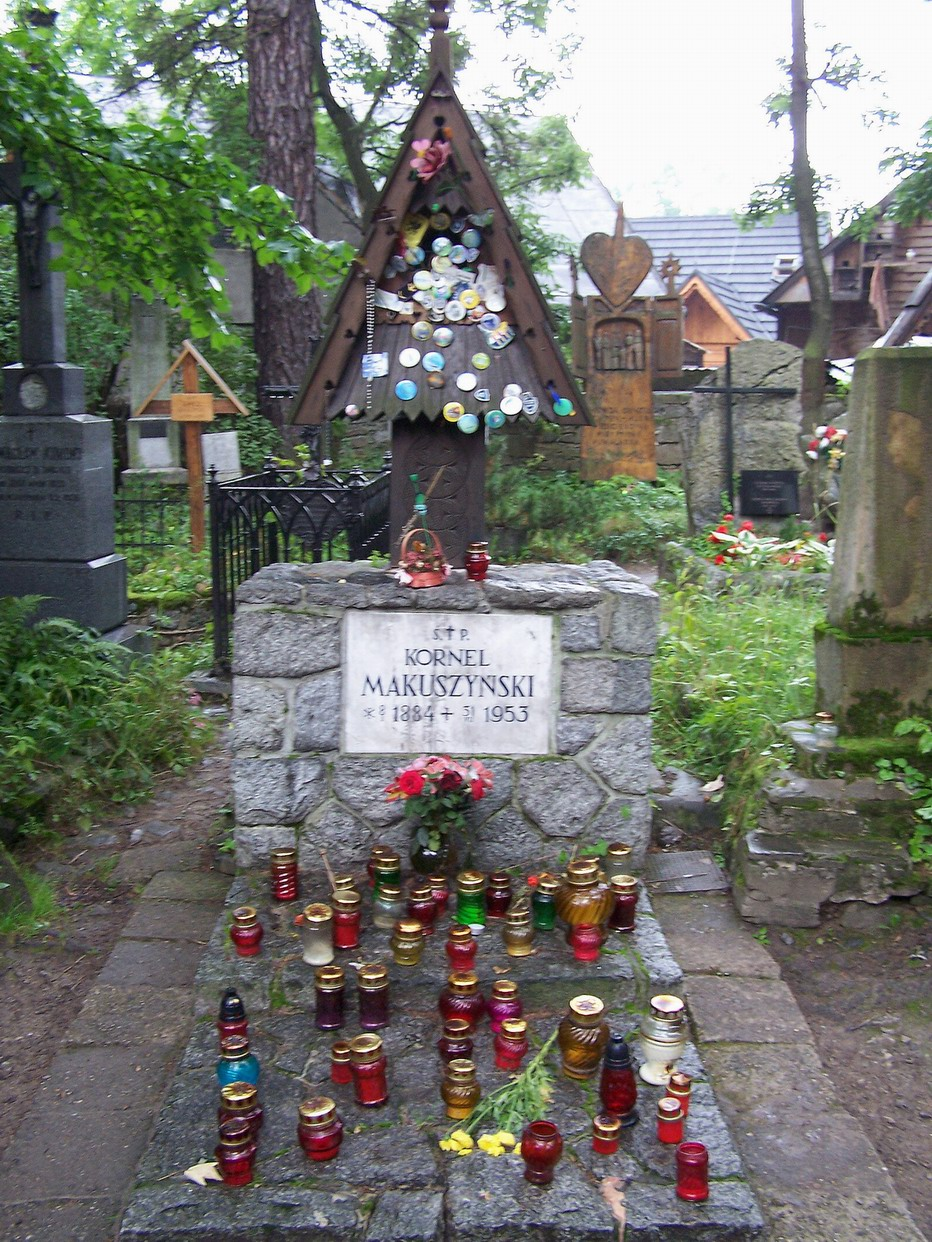
Makuszyński's grave in Zakopane

== Works ==
- Arabian Affairs (1913; Awantury Arabskie)
- Innocent Years (1925; Bezgrzeszne lata)
- The Two Who Stole the Moon (1928; O dwóch takich, co ukradli księżyc; filmed in 1962 starring Lech Kaczyński, former President of Poland, and his identical twin brother Jarosław, former Prime Minister of Poland)
- 120 adventures of Matołek the Billy-Goat (1933; 120 Przygód Koziołka Matołka)
- The Smile of Lwów, (1934; Usmiech Lwowa)
- Argument about Basia (1936; Awantura o Basię; first English translation published on Amazon in 2025, filmed 1959)
- Satan from the 7th grade (1937; Szatan z siódmej klasy) (The first English translation from 2024 is called The Twelfth Grade Devil)
- Merry Devil's Friend (1937; Przyjaciel wesołego diabła; filmed 1987)
- About the Wawel Dragon (1937; O wawelskim smoku; filmed 1987)
- Miss Eva's folly (1940; Szaleństwa panny Ewy; filmed 1985)

== See also ==
- List of Poles
