= Pacanów =

- Town
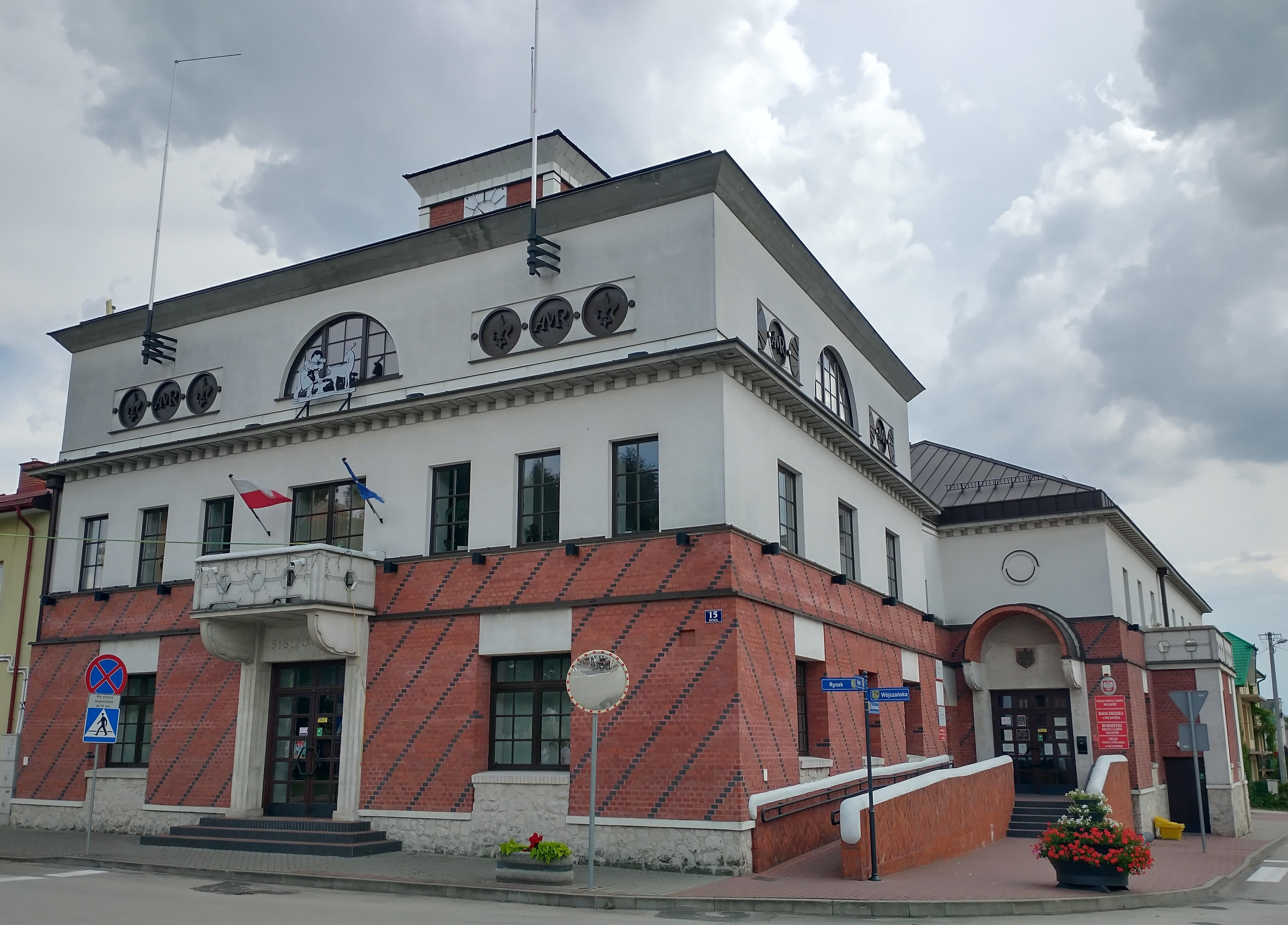
- Town Hall

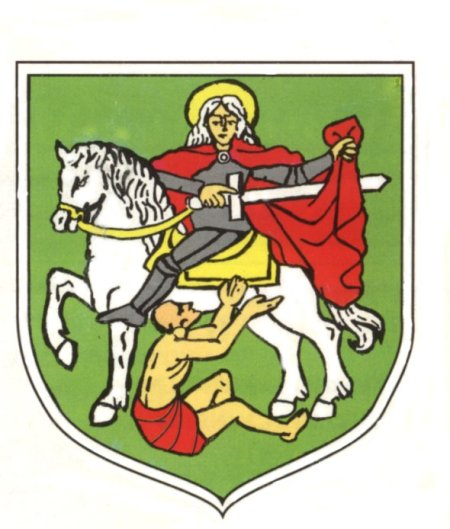
- Coat of arms

- Location within Poland
- Coordinates: 50°24′N 21°3′E
- Country: Poland
- Voivodeship: Świętokrzyskie
- County: Busko-Zdrój
- Gmina: Pacanów
- First mentioned: 1110s
- Town rights: 1265

Area
  - Total: 7.13 km^{2} (2.75 sq mi)

Population (2003)
  - Total: 1,137
  - Density: 159/km^{2} (413/sq mi)
- Time zone: UTC+1 (CET)
  - Summer (DST): UTC+2 (CEST)
- Postal code: 28–133
- Area code: +48 41
- Car plates: TBU
- Website: pacanow.pl

Pacanów [paˈt͡sanuf], sometimes referred to as the European Capital of Fable, is a town in Busko County, Świętokrzyskie Voivodeship in southern Poland. It is the seat of Gmina Pacanów. It had a population of 1137 in 2003. In modern times the town is partly noted for its connection to the fictional character Koziołek Matołek. It lies in historic Lesser Poland, approximately 25 km (16 mi) east of Busko-Zdrój and 62 km (39 mi) south-east of the regional capital Kielce.

== History ==
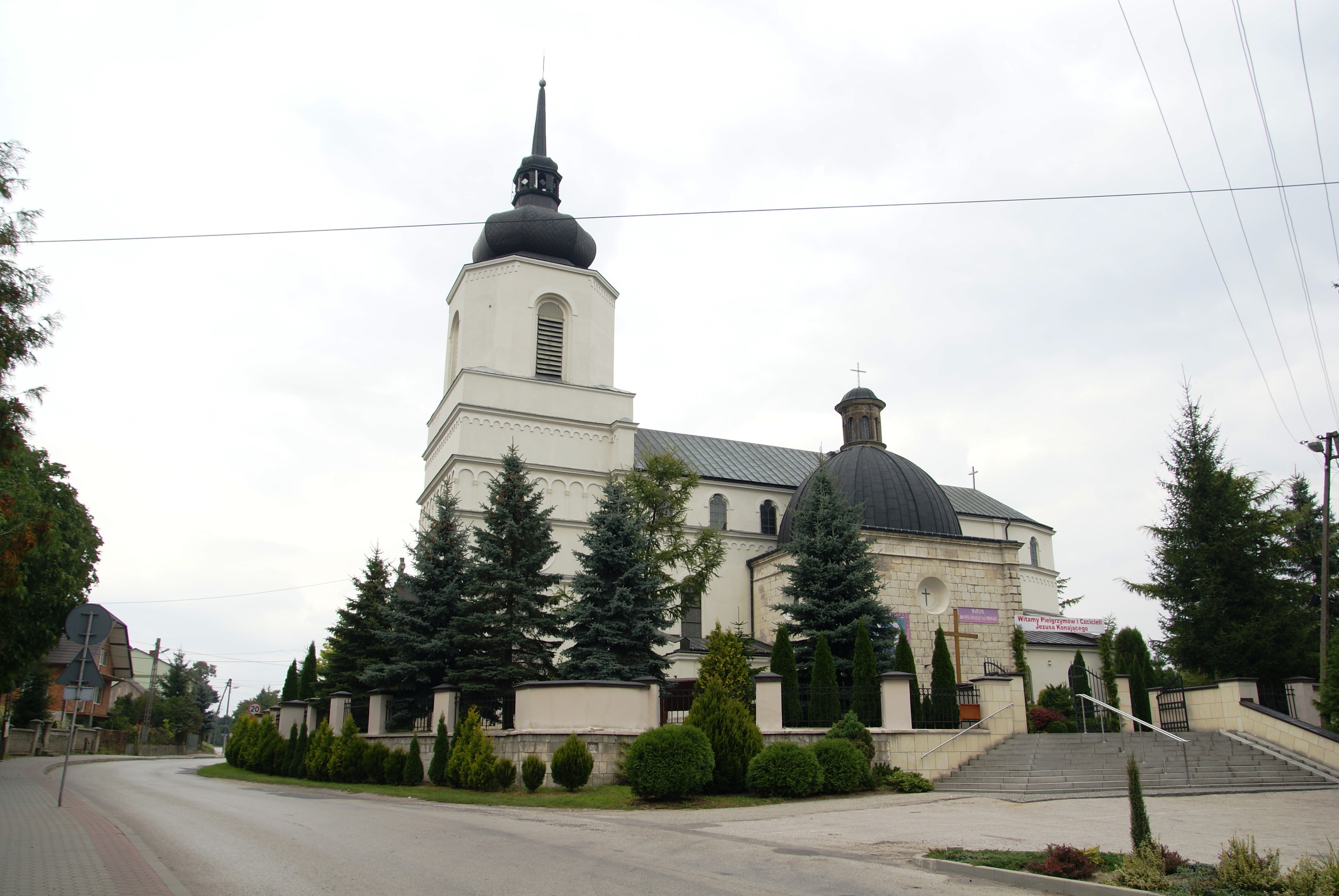
Saint Martin church

Pacanów was first mentioned in a document from 1110 to 1117, issued by the Bishop of Kraków Maur, in which the erection of St. Martin's church was confirmed. At that time, the village probably belonged to a man named Siemian, who is mentioned in the document. The existence of the parish church was confirmed on August 1219 by the incumbent Bishop of Kraków Iwo Odrowąż, and in 1265, the village was granted Magdeburg rights by Prince Bolesław V the Chaste. In the same period, a number of local villages were also granted town charters (Połaniec, Nowy Korczyn, Koprzywnica and Opatowiec). The original charter of Pacanów has not been preserved, but in a document issued on February 26, 1603, King Sigismund III Vasa reconfirmed its town status.

Pacanów remained a private Bailiwick, belonging, among others, to a man named Piotr of Mokrsko and Pacanów, Castellan of Małogoszcz, (1306–1310), Wiślica (1315), and Sandomierz (1317–1328). By 1417, the town already had a parish school, and in 1433 in Nowy Korczyn, King Władysław II Jagiełło recognized its Magdeburg rights, allowing a number of fairs to be held there. The town was administratively located in the Sandomierz Voivodeship in the Lesser Poland Province. In 1502, during a Tatar raid, in which the invaders crossed the Vistula, Pacanów was successfully defended. The significance of the town was further enhanced when Nicholas of Cusa included Pacanów on his map of Central Europe. In 1583 and 1585 King Stephen Bathory stayed there briefly. The town's prosperity came to an end during the Swedish invasion of Poland. On April 9, 1657, the town was captured by the Transilvanian army of George II Rakoczi. The invaders burned it to the ground, and that marked the decline of Pacanów, which never quite recovered its former importance.

As a result of the Partitions of Poland, Pacanów became part of the Austrian Habsburg Empire. After the Polish victory in the Austro-Polish War of 1809, it became part of the short-lived Duchy of Warsaw, and after the duchy's dissolution, it was part of Russian-controlled Congress Poland from 1815 to 1915. On August 24, 1813, the town was completely flooded by the Vistula River. In 1820, Pacanów had circa 1,000 residents, half of whom were Jewish. In 1869, following the failed January Uprising, the Imperial Russian authorities revoked the town status and reduced it to a village.

In 1918, with Poland regaining independence, Pacanów became part of the Second Polish Republic, within Kielce Voivodeship. According to the 1921 census, it had a population of 2,598, 35.0% Polish and 65.0% Jewish. Jews owned most local businesses and stores.

Following the German-Soviet invasion of Poland, which started World War II in September 1939, the town was occupied by Germany. The Jews were conscripted for forced, usually unpaid, labor. Jews from Radom were forcibly resettled into Pacanów resulting in a widespread lack of housing and severe overcrowding. In April 1942, a ghetto was set up with an average of 12 or 13 people per room. Jews were not allowed into the marketplace and some local Christians smuggled food for trade. In October, 1942, some of the younger Jews were sent to labor camps, some were killed in Pacanów, and the rest taken to the Treblinka extermination camp where they were murdered by the Nazis. The number of survivors among Pacanów's Jews is unknown.

== Transport ==
National road 79 passes to the east of Pacanów.

National road 73 passes to the west of Pacanów.

The nearest railway station is in Busko-Zdrój.

== Personalities associated with the town ==
- Feliks Paweł Jarocki, 19th century zoologist;
- Kornel Makuszyński and Marian Walentynowicz, creators of the following one:
- Koziołek Matołek, a mythical goat-hero associated with Pacanów.

== Koziołek Matołek ==
The fictional character Koziołek Matołek, or Matołek the Billy-Goat in English, was searching for a Pacanów due to hearing that in Pacanów they give goats horseshoes. He was created by Kornel Makuszyński (story) and Marian Walentynowicz (art) in one of the first and most famous Polish comics back in 1933.

Once when Makuszyński and Walentynowicz were sitting in a coffee house in Kraków, they spotted a sad looking man sipping a drink at a nearby table. They asked him why he looked so gloomy, and he told them that he came from the small town of Pacanów and was wondering how to help the town prosper. Makuszyński and Walentynowicz decided then to help him by popularizing the small town in their books.

It became a cult classic, popular since its creation till today, and becoming an important part of canon of Polish children's literature. The comic has influenced many generations of Poles, and some of its phrases have penetrated into the Polish language itself, with expressions like 'w Pacanowie kozy kują' (In Pacanów, they shoe goats), 'pacan' and 'matoł' (slowpoke, dummy). Later it was made into a children's cartoon.

To this day Koziołek Matołek remains Pacanów's claim to fame, and images of him can be seen all around the town.

The first monument to Matołek the Goat in Pacanów, 1984.

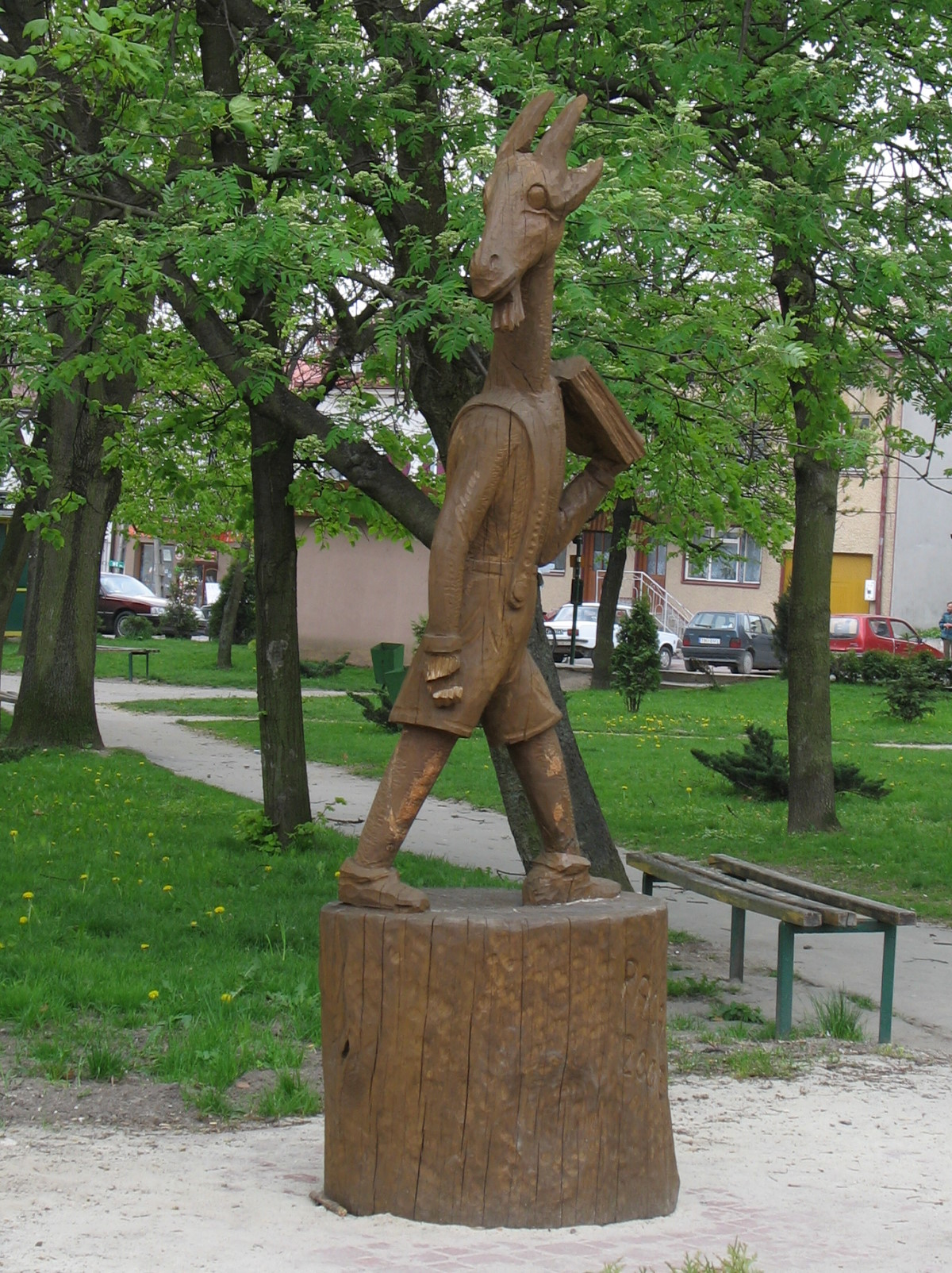
Koziołek Matołek monument in Pacanów square

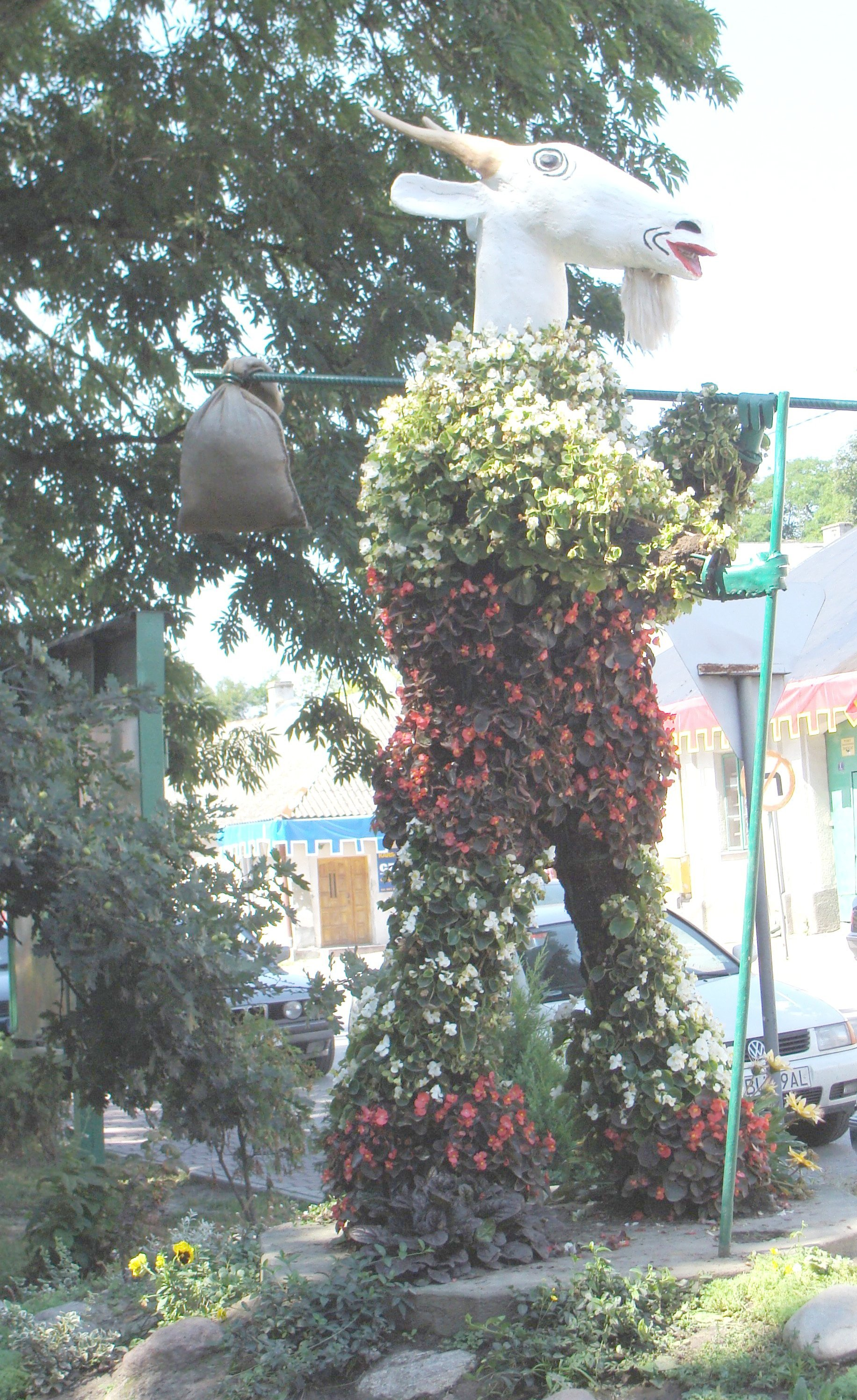
Floral monument

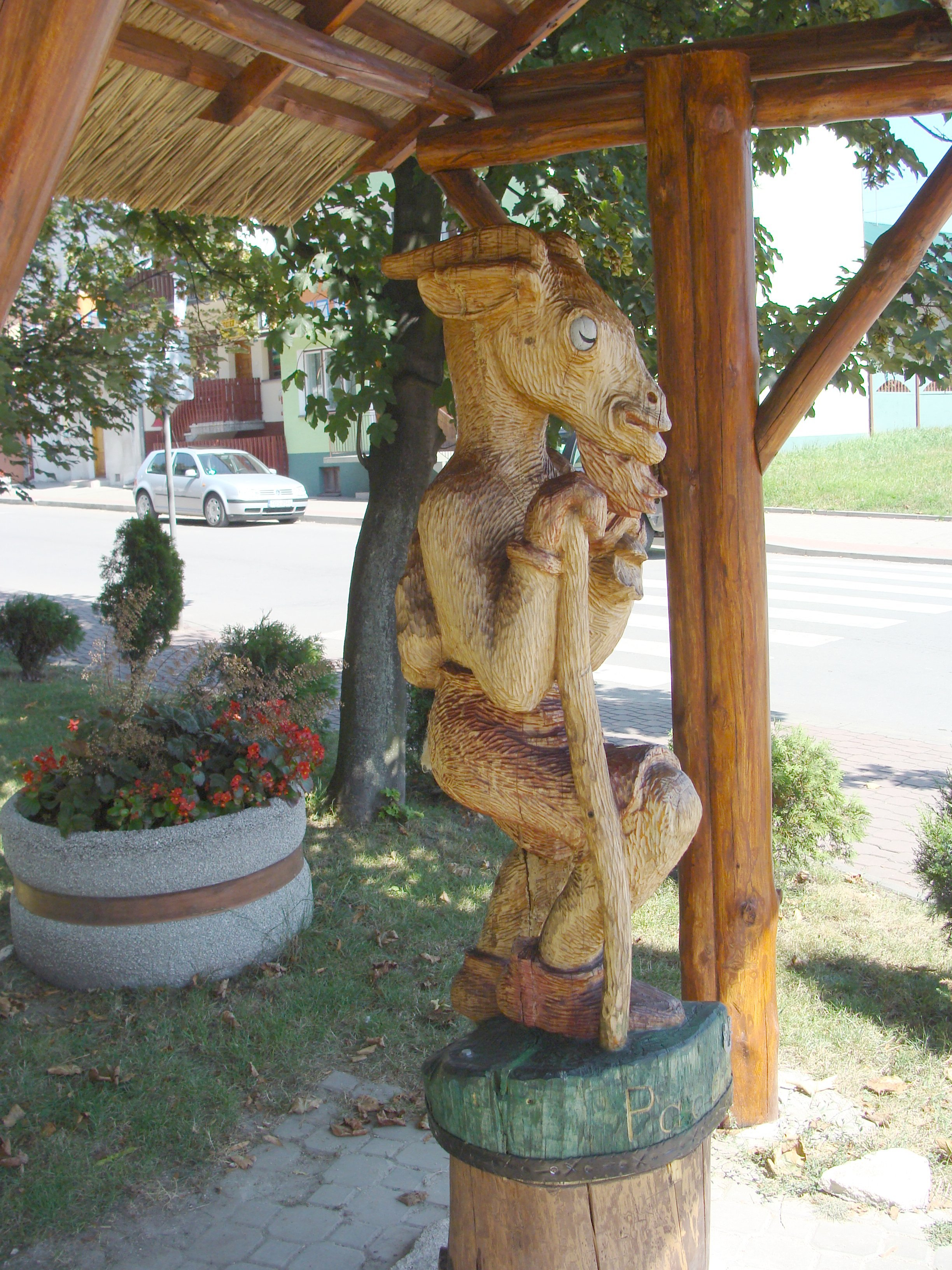
Wooden monument

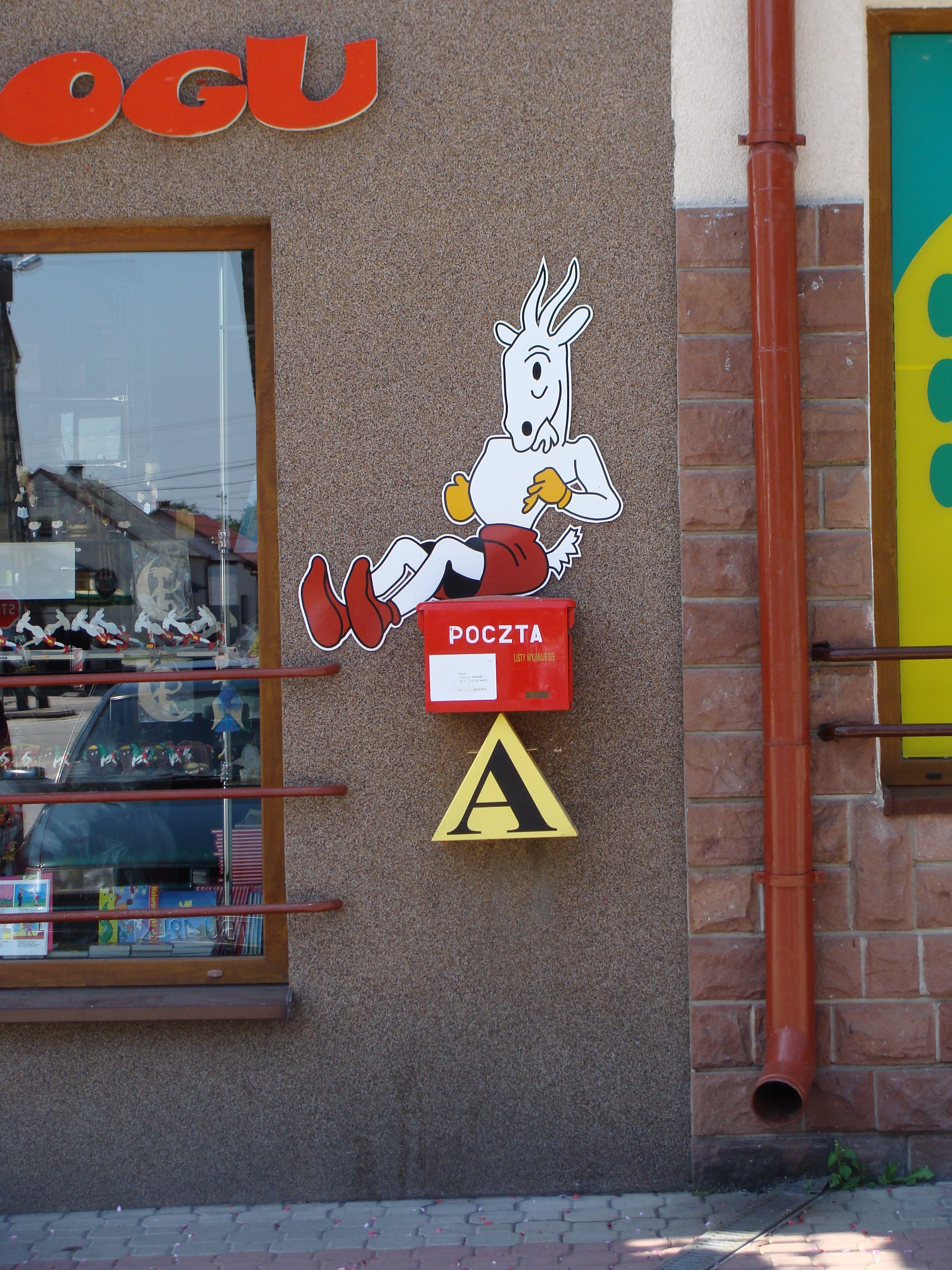
Koziołek Matołek on a post box

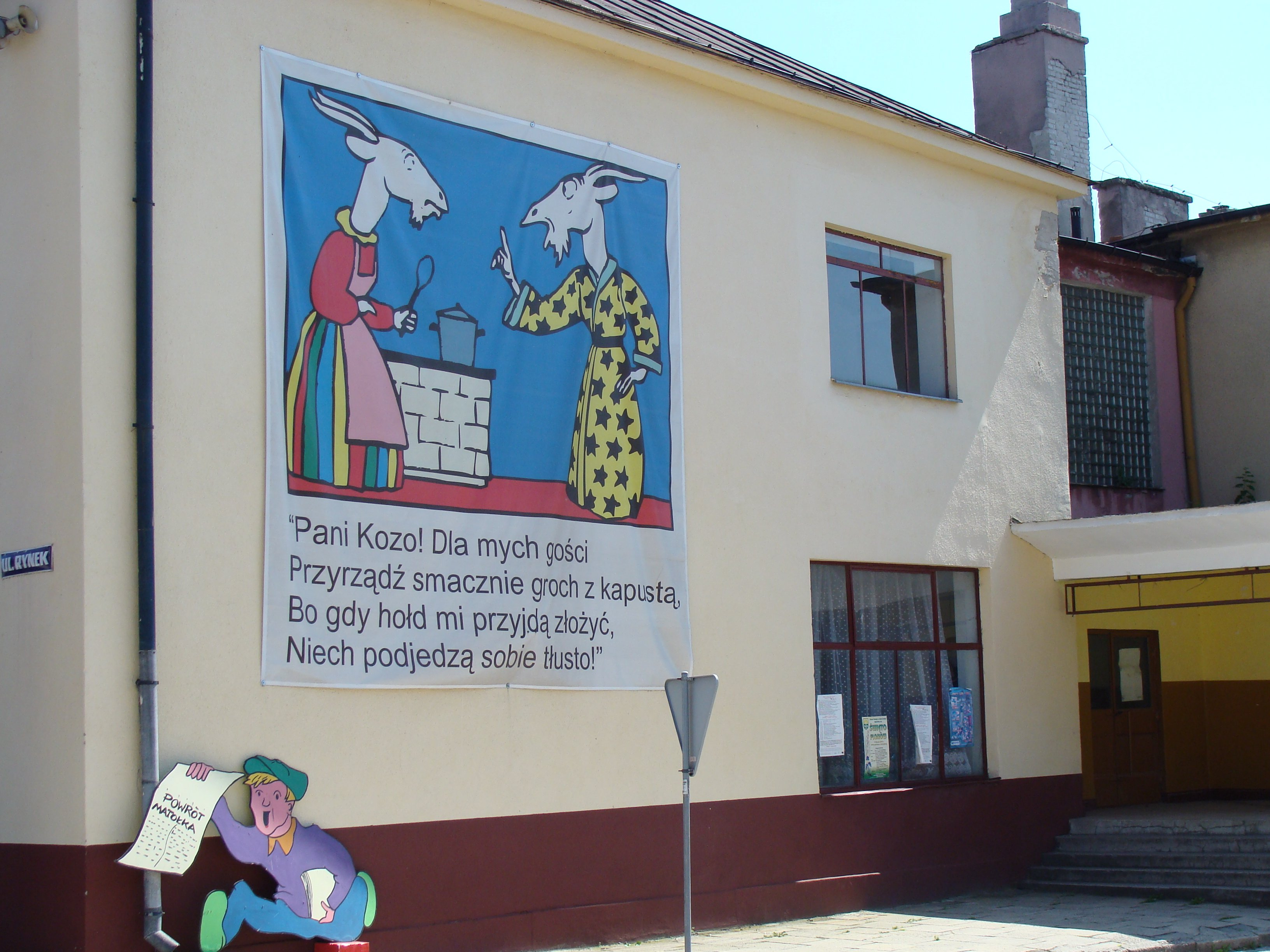
Restaurants, shops, offices, all feature Koziołek Matołek

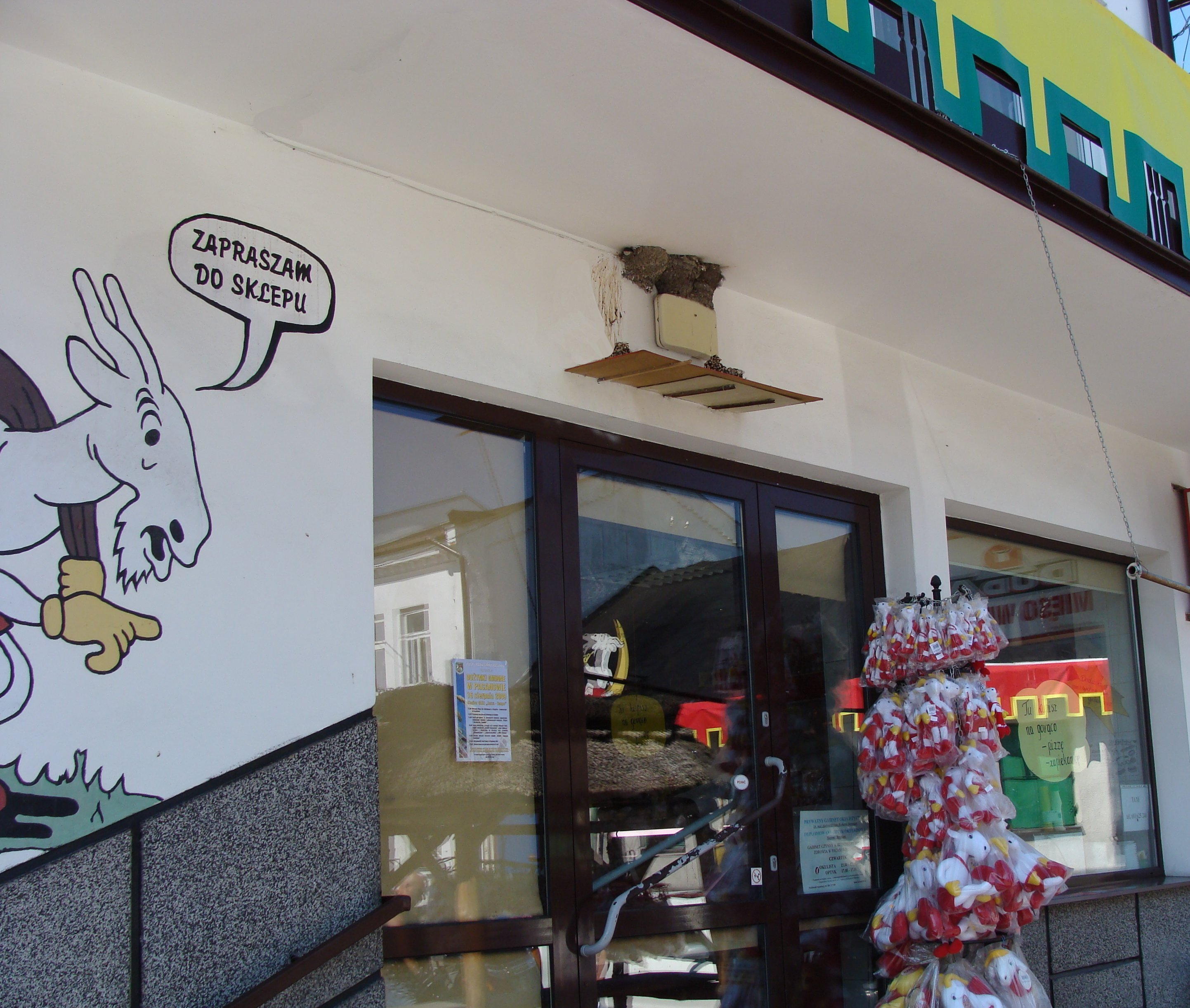
Koziołek Matołek is inviting customers into a shop

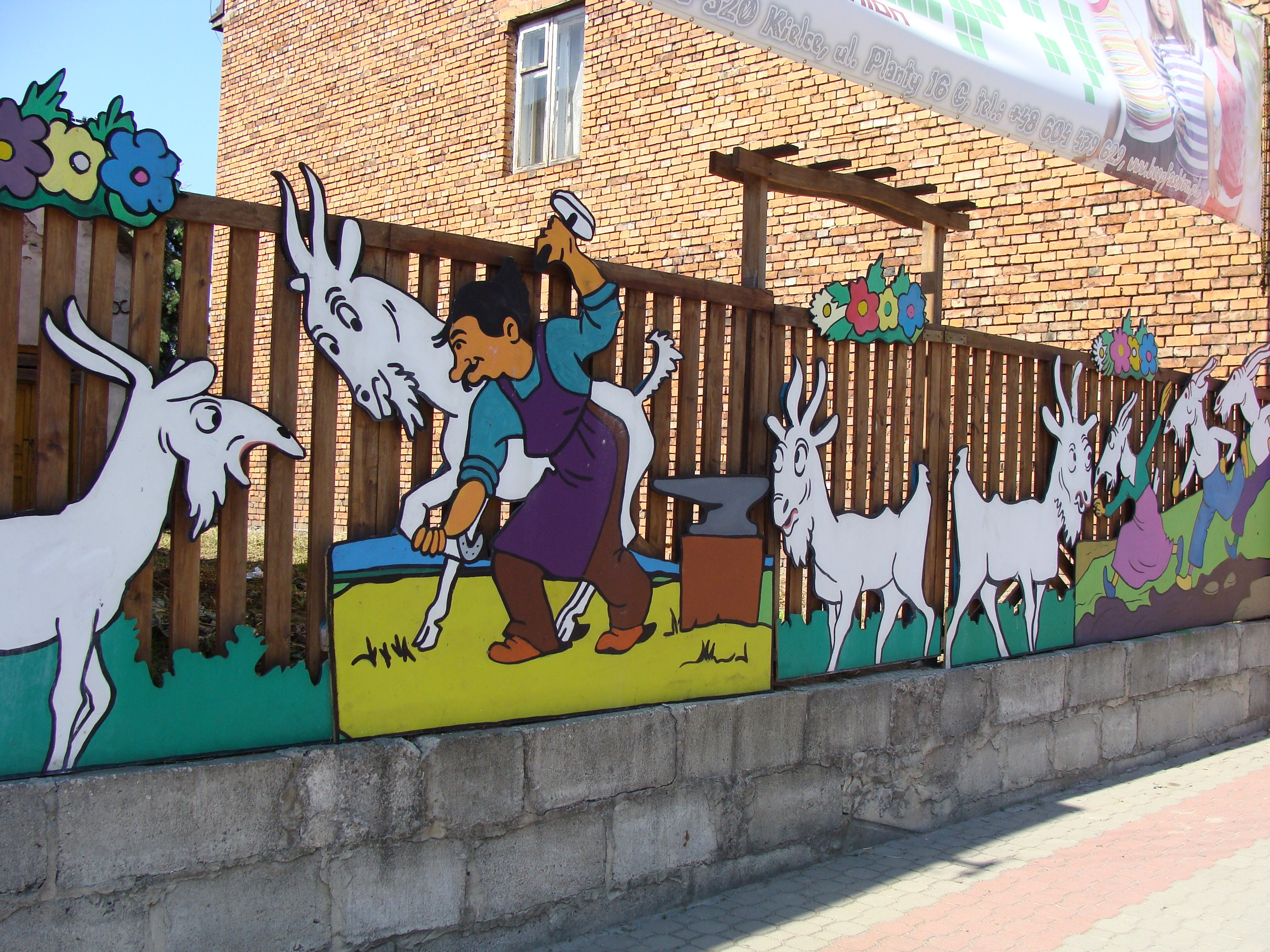
Koziołek Matołek on a road-side fence

There exists a Fairy Tale Center in the town.
