= Rafaeli =

Rafaeli or Refaeli (רפאלי in Hebrew) is a Hebrew surname which means "son of Rafael", similar to Italian Raffaelli. Notable people with the surname include:

- Anat Rafaeli (born 1954), Israeli organizational behavior researcher
- Bar Refaeli (born 1985), Israeli model and actress
- Eliezer Rafaeli (1926–2018), Israeli founding President of the University of Haifa
- Sheizaf Rafaeli (born 1955), Israeli computer scientist and writer
- Shuli Mualem-Rafaeli (born 1965), Israeli politician
- Yam Refaeli, Israeli musical artist
- Zvi Raphaeli (1924–2005), Israeli painter

== See also ==
- Raffaello (disambiguation)
