= San Rafael =

San Rafael may refer to:

== Places ==
=== Argentina ===
- San Rafael, Mendoza
- San Rafael Department, Mendoza

=== Bolivia ===
- San Rafael de Velasco, capital of San Rafael Municipality
- San Rafael Municipality, Santa Cruz

=== Chile ===
- San Rafael, Chile, Maule Region
- Laguna San Rafael National Park, Aysén Region
  - San Rafael Glacier
  - San Rafael Lake

=== Colombia ===
- San Rafael, Antioquia

=== Costa Rica ===
- San Rafael (canton), Heredia
- San Rafael de Guatuso, Guatuso, Alajuela
- San Rafael District, Alajuela, Alajuela
- San Rafael District, San Rafael, Heredia
- San Rafael District, San Ramón, Alajuela

=== Dominican Republic ===
- San Rafael del Yuma

=== Ecuador ===
- San Rafael Falls

=== El Salvador ===
- San Rafael, Chalatenango
- San Rafael Cedros, Cuscatlán
- San Rafael Obrajuelo, La Paz
- San Rafael Oriente, San Miguel

=== Guatemala ===
- San Rafael Las Flores, Santa Rosa
- San Rafael La Independencia, Huehuetenango
- San Rafael Petzal, Huehuetenango
- San Rafael Pie de la Cuesta, San Marcos

=== Honduras ===
- San Rafael, Lempira

=== Mexico ===
- San Rafael, Sinaloa
- San Rafael, Veracruz

=== Nicaragua ===
- San Rafael del Norte, Jinotega
- San Rafael del Sur, Managua

=== Paraguay ===
- San Rafael del Paraná, Itapúa

=== Peru ===
- San Rafael District, Ambo

=== Philippines ===
- San Rafael, Bulacan
- San Rafael, Iloilo
- San Rafael, Tarlac City, Tarlac
- San Rafael, a barangay in San Felipe, Zambales

=== Spain ===
- San Rafael del Río, Castellón
- San Rafael, Ibiza
- San Rafael (El Espinar)

=== United States ===
- Arizona
  - San Rafael, Arizona
  - San Rafael Valley
- California
  - San Rafael, California
  - San Rafael Hills, in Los Angeles County, California
  - San Rafael Mountains, in Santa Barbara County, California
- New Mexico
  - Zorro Ranch, renamed to Rancho de San Rafael
  - San Rafael, New Mexico
- Utah
  - San Rafael River, in Utah

=== Venezuela ===
- San Rafael de Onoto, Portuguesa
- San Rafael del Piñal, Táchira
- San Rafael de Carvajal, Trujillo
- San Rafael del Moján, Zulia

== Geology ==
- San Rafael Block, in Argentina
- San Rafael Formation, in Mexico
- San Rafael Group, in the United States
- San Rafael orogeny, in Argentina and Chile
- San Rafael Swell, in Utah

== Transport ==
- San Rafael (steamboat)
- San Rafael Airport (disambiguation)
- San Rafael railway station (Chihuahua), Mexico
- San Rafael railway station (Tlalnepantla de Baz), State of Mexico, Mexico
- San Rafael Transit Center, in San Rafael, California

== Other uses ==
- Battle of San Rafael, part of the Philippine Revolution
- Mission San Rafael Arcángel, a Spanish mission in California
- Roman Catholic Diocese of San Rafael, in Argentina

== See also ==
- Rafael (disambiguation)
- Raphael (disambiguation)
- Saint Raphael (disambiguation)
