= Raphael (given name) =

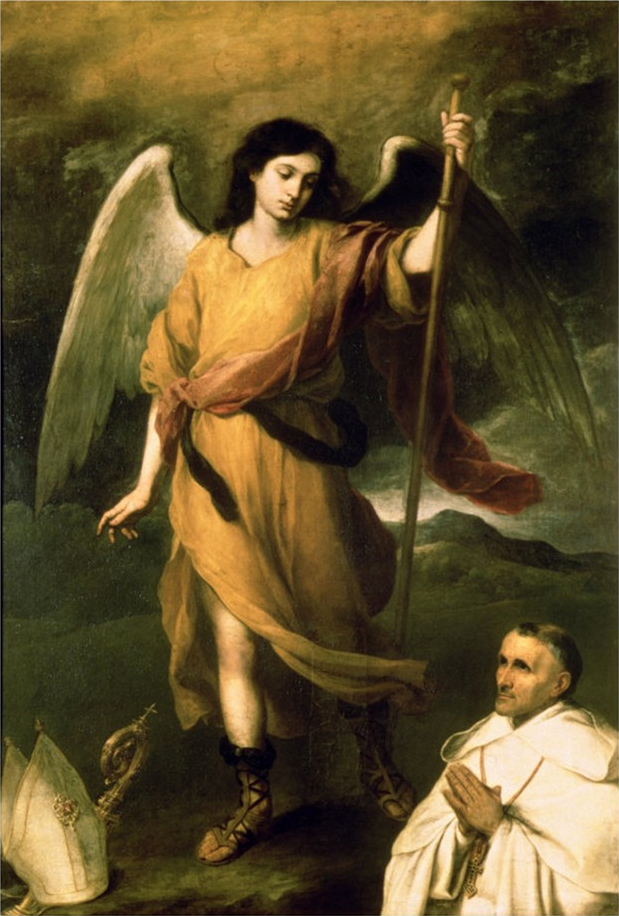
- Archangel Raphael
- Pronunciation: /ˈræfeɪ.əl, ˈræfi.əl, ˈreɪfi.əl, ˌræfaɪˈɛl/ RAF-ay-əl, RAF-ee-əl, RAY-fee-əl, RAF-eye-EL
- Gender: Male

Origin
- Origin: Hebrew
- Meaning: "God has healed"
- Region of origin: Ancient Israel

Other names
- Related names: Raphaël; Rafał; Rafael; Raffael; Raffaelo; Raffaello; Raffiel; Refoel; Raffaele; Refael; Rapolas; Rafi; Raffi; Rafifi; Raffaella(female)

Raphael is a given name derived from the Hebrew rāp̄ā'ēl (רָפָאֵל) meaning "God has healed". Raphael is one of the archangels according to Abrahamic tradition. The angel Raphael appears in the Book of Tobit, considered deuterocanonical by the Roman Catholic and Eastern Orthodox churches and apocryphal by Protestants. Popularized in Western Europe, the name can be spelled Raphael, Raphaël, Rafael, Raffael, Raffaello, Raffiel, Refoel, Raffaele, or Refael depending on the language.

The name is attested as far back as c. 1350 BC, appearing in a letter of Pabi, Prince of Lachish in center Israel, to Pharaoh Akhenaton ("Now have I sent you Rapha-el.").

Usage of the name in the Anglosphere has been primarily among Roman Catholics. English Puritans considered it sacrilegious to name a child for an angel. United States census records show that men with the name Rafael or Raphael lived primarily in Spanish-speaking or French-speaking areas. The name has increased in use in the late 20th and early 21st centuries due to cultural influences such as Raphael, a character from the Teenage Mutant Ninja Turtles.

== Translations ==
- Amharic: ሩፋኤል (Rufael)
- Arabic: رفائيل (Rāfāʿīl)
- Armenian: Ռաֆայել (Ṙafayel)
- Azerbaijani: Rafael
- Belarusian: Рафаэль (Rafaeĺ)
- Bengali: রাফায়েল (Rāphāẏēl)
- Catalan: Rafel
- Cebuano: Rapáel
- Chamorro: Rafet
- Chinese Simplified: 拉斐尔 (Lā fěi ěr)
- Chinese Traditional: 拉斐爾 (Lā fěi ěr)
- Coptic: Ⲣⲁⲫⲁⲏⲗ (Rapha’êl)
- Czech: Rafael
- Esperanto: Rafaelo
- Finnish: Rafael
- French: Raphaël
- German: Raphael
- Greek: Ραφαήλ (Rafaī́l)
- Gujarati: રાફેલ (Rāphēla)
- Hebrew: רפאל (Rafa'el)
- Hindi: रफएल (Rapha'ēla)
- Indonesian: Rafael
- Italian: Raffaello, Raffaele
- Japanese: ラファエル (Rafaeru)
- Kannada: ರಾಫೆಲ್ (Rāphel)
- Korean: 라파엘 (Lapael)
- Latin: Raphael, Rafelu
- Lithuanian: Rapolas
- Macedonian: Рафаел (Rafael)
- Maltese: Rafel
- Montenegrin: Rafailo (Рафаило), Rafail (Рафаил)
- Malayalam: റപ്പായേൽ (Rāppāēl)
- Mongolian: Рафаэль (Rafaeli)
- Nepali: रफाएल (Raphā'ēla)
- Old Norse: Raife, also nickname ''Raðulfr''
- Norwegian: Rafael
- Persian: رافائل (Rāfāel)
- Polish: Rafał
- Portuguese: Rafael
- Punjabi: ਰਾਫਾਈਲ (Rāphā'īla)
- Romanian: Rafael
- Russian: Рафаил (Rafail)
- Serbian: Рафаило (Rafailo)
- Slovenian: Rafael
- Spanish: Rafael (Rafa'el)
- Tagalog: Rafael, also nickname "Paeng"
- Tamil: ரபேல் (Rapēl)
- Telugu: రాఫెల్ (Rāphel)
- Thai: ราฟาเอล (Rā fā xel)
- Ukrainian: Рафаїл (Rafaīl)
- Urdu: رافائيل (Rāfāʿēl)

== Notable people with the name ==
- Raphael (archangel), an archangel in Judaism, Christianity, and Islam, after whom all or most other uses are named

=== Mononym ===
- Raphael, or Raffaello Sanzio (1483–1520), Italian master painter and architect in the High Renaissance
- Raphael (singer) (born 1943), Spanish singer
- Raphael (musician) (born 1948), American musician
- Raphael of Brooklyn (1860–1915), a saint in the Christian Orthodox tradition
- Raphael of Lesbos (died 1463), Eastern Orthodox saint, see Saints Raphael, Nicholas and Irene of Lesbos
- Patriarch Raphael I of Constantinople, Patriarch from 1475 to 1476
- Patriarch Raphael II of Constantinople, Patriarch from 1603 to 1607
- pseudonym of Robert Cross Smith (1795–1832)
- "Raph" (1910–1994), French racing driver

=== Birth ===
- Raphael Abramovitch (1880–1963), Russian bundist and communist politician
- Raphael Sylvanus Amegashie (1927–2013), Ghanaian entrepreneur, accountant, and politician
- Raphael Benjamin (1846–1906), British-born Australian and American rabbi
- Rafael Bermúdez (born 1978), Uruguayan footballer
- Raphael I Bidawid (1922–2003), Patriarch of the Chaldean Catholic Church in 1989–2003
- Raphael Bob-Waksberg (born 1984), American comedian, writer and creator of BoJack Horseman
- Raphael Botti (born 1982), Brazilian footballer
- Raphael Hayyim Isaac Carregal (1733–1777), itinerant rabbi and preacher from the Ottoman Empire
- Raphael Chukwu (born 1975), Nigerian football (soccer) player
- Raphael Davis (born 1976), American mixed martial artist
- Raphael Dwamena (born 1995), Ghanaian footballer
- Raphael Girard (1898-1982), Anthropologist and writer
- Raphael Gray (born 1981), British computer hacker
- Raphael Gualazzi (born 1981), Italian singer and pianist
- Raphael Holinshed (1529–1580), English chronicler
- Raphael Holzdeppe (born 1989), German pole vaulter
- Raphael Kalinowski (1835–1907), Polish saint in the Discalced Carmelite Order
- Raphael Koster (born 1971), American game designer
- Raphael Lasker (1838–1904), German-American rabbi
- Raphael Lemkin, Holocaust survivor
- Raphael Martelli (1811–1880), first Catholic priest in Toodyay, Western Australia
- Raphael Matos (born 1981), Brazilian racing driver
- Rafael "Rafi" Menco (born 1994), Israeli basketball player for Hapoel Holon in the Israeli Basketball Premier League
- Raphael Nathan Nota Rabinovicz (1835–1888), rabbi from the Russian Empire
- Raphael Ohin (born 1995), Ghanaian footballer
- Raphael M. Quaye (born 1975), Liberian basketball player
- Raphael Saadiq (born 1966), American singer, songwriter, musician, guitarist, and record producer
- Raphael Schäfer (born 1979), German footballer
- Raphael Schäfer (politician) (born 1981), German politician
- Raphael Semmes (1809–1877), officer in the United States Navy from 1826 to 1860 and the Confederate States Navy from 1860 to 1865
- Raphael Warnock (born 1969), American pastor and U.S. Senator from Georgia

=== Fictional characters ===
- Raphael, one of the four Teenage Mutant Ninja Turtles
- Raphael Kirsten, a fictional character in the video game Fire Emblem: Three Houses
- Raphael Sorel, a fictional character in Soulcalibur series of video games

== See also ==
- Raphaël (given name)
- Saint Raphael (disambiguation)
- Raphael (disambiguation)
- Rafael (disambiguation)
- Raphiael Putney (born 1990), American basketball player in Israel
- Raphael (surname)
