= Raffaello =

- Pronunciation: Italian pronunciation: [raffaˈɛllo]
- Gender: Male

Origin
- Region of origin: Italy

Raffaello is an Italian given name, and a variant of Raphael. It usually refers to Raphael (Raffaello Sanzio da Urbino), an Italian painter and architect of the High Renaissance.

== Notable people with the given name ==
- Raffaello Carboni (1817–1875), Italian writer
- Raffaello Ducceschi (born 1962), Italian race walker
- Raffaello Fabretti (1620–1700), Italian antiquary
- Raffaello Funghini (1929–2006), Italian catholic clergyman
- Raffaello Gestro (1845–1936), Italian entomologist
- Raffaello Maffei (1455–1522), Italian humanist, historian and theologian
- Raffaello Matarazzo (1909–1966), Italian film-maker
- Raffaello da Montelupo (1504–1566), sculptor and architect of the Italian Renaissance
- Raffaello Sanzio Morghen (1758–1833), Italian engraver
- Raffaello Vanni (1595–1678), Italian painter of the Baroque

== See also ==
- Raphael (disambiguation)
- Raffaella
- Raffaele
- Raffaellino
