= Raffaelli =

Raffaelli or Raffaeli is an Italian surname. Notable people with the surname include:

- Baires Raffaelli, Italian architect and author
- Cyril Raffaelli, French traceur, martial artist and stuntman
- Daniele Raffaeli (born 1977), Italian voice actor
- Esuperanzio Raffaelli (died 1668), Roman Catholic prelate who served as Bishop of Penne e Atri
- Giacomo Raffaelli (artist), Italian mosaicist from Rome
- Giacomo Raffaelli (volleyball) (born 1995), Italian male volleyball player
- Jean-François Raffaëlli, French realist painter, sculptor, and printmaker who exhibited with the Impressionists
- John D. Raffaelli, American lobbyist born in Texarkana
- Paolo Raffaelli, Italian politician and journalist
- Philip Raffaelli, British general practitioner and Royal Naval Medical Officer
- Ron Raffaelli, American photographer
- Sofia Raffaeli, Italian rhythmic gymnast
- Darin Raffaelli, guitarist, formerly of the band Supercharger

== See also ==
- Raffaello (disambiguation)
- Rafaeli
