= Rafi =

Rafi may refer to:

== Places ==
- Rafi, Iran, a city in Khuzestan Province
- Rafi, Abadan, a village in Khuzestan Province
- Rafi, Nigeria, a Local Government Area of Niger State
- Rafi Marg (lit. 'Rafi Road'), a road in New Delhi, India named after Rafi Ahmed Kidwai; site of the Parliament House and other government buildings

== Other uses ==
- Rafi (name), a name of Arabic origin
- Rafi, Indian film director, one half of Rafi–Mecartin
- Mohammed Rafi, Indian singer, known as Rafi
- Rafi (political party), an acronym for Reshimat Poalei Yisrael (Israeli Workers List) a political party in Israel during the 1960s
- A nickname often given to people named Rafael (or Rafaela)

== See also ==
- Raffi (disambiguation), a given name of Armenian origin
- R.A.F.I. (album), by Asian Dub Foundation
- Rafael (disambiguation)
