= Raffi (disambiguation) =

Raffi, full name Raffi Cavoukian (born 1948), is a Canadian singer-songwriter best known for his children's music.

Raffi may also refer to:

- Raffi (novelist), pen name of Hakob Melik-Hakobian (1835–1888), Armenian author and poet
- Raffi Armenian (born 1942), Canadian musician
- Raffi Besalyan, Armenian-American pianist
- Raffi Boghosian (born 1990), Iraqi journalist, writer and TV host
- Raffi Boghosyan, or Raffi (born 1993), Bulgarian singer
- Raffi Freedman-Gurspan (born 1987), American transgender activist
- Raffi Hovannisian (born 1959), Armenian politician
- Raffi Khatchadourian, Armenian-American journalist
- Raffi Krikorian (born 1978), Armenian-American technology executive
- Raffi M. Nazikian, Armenian-American physicist
- Raffi Qasabian, Armenian Australian surgeon
- Rafi (name), or Raffi, a name of Arabic origin

== Middle name ==
- Youri Raffi Djorkaeff (born 1968), French footballer

== See also ==
- Rafi (disambiguation)
- Raffy (disambiguation)
