= Raffaella =

- Gender: Female
- Language: Hebrew (origin), Italian, Greek, Spanish

Origin
- Origin: Raphael (archangel)
- Meaning: God heal her
- Region of origin: Israel, Italy, Greece, Spain

Other names
- Related names: Raffaello

Raffaella (also spelled Raffaela, Raphaella and Raphaela) is an Hebrew female name taken from the Hebrew male name Rafael, meaning in Hebrew "God heal her". Used as a female name in Israel, Italy, Greece, Spain, Brazil.

== Notable people with the name ==
- Raffaella Baracchi (born 1964), retired Italian actress
- Raffaella Barker (born 1964), English author
- Raffaella Bosurgi, neuroscientist
- Raffaella Bragazzi (1959–2026), Italian television and radio host
- Raffaella Brutto (born 1988), Italian snowboarder
- Raffaella Calloni (born 1983), Italian volleyball player
- Raffaella Camet Bertello (born 1992), Peruvian volleyball player
- Raffaella Carrà (1943–2021), Italian TV hostess, singer and actress
- Raffaella Corrales (born 1963), Spanish politician and LGBTQ rights activist
- Raffaella De Laurentiis (born 1954), Italian film producer
- Raffaella De Vita, Italian and American biomechanical engineer
- Raffaella Fico (born 1988), Italian showgirl, singer and model
- Raffaella Imbriani (born 1973), German judoka
- Raffaella Laezza (born 1961), Italian architect, architectural theorist, essayist and academic
- Raffaella Leone (born 1961 or 1962), Italian film producer
- Raffaella Margutti, Italian multi-messenger astronomer
- Raffaella Modugno (born 1988), Italian model
- Raffaella Paita (born 1974), Italian politician
- Raffaella Reggi (born 1965), Italian former professional tennis player
- Raffaella Schneider (born 1971), Italian astrophysicist
