= Cataphractus =

Cataphractus may refer to:

- Cataphractus Gronow, 1763 – synonym of Pegasus
- Cataphractus Catesby, 1771 – not available
- Cataphractus Edwards, 1771 – synonym of Acanthodoras
- Cataphractus Klein, 1777 – synonym of Agonus
- Cataphractus Storr, 1780 – synonym of Dasypus
- Cataphractus Walbaum, 1792 – synonym of Agonus
- Cataphractus Bloch, 1794 – synonym of Callichthys
- Cataphractus Fleming, 1828 – synonym of Agonus

== See also ==
- Cataphract, a type of armoured cavalry
