= Rafiel =

Rafiel may refer to:

- Jason Rafiel, a character in A Caribbean Mystery by Agatha Christie
- Michael Rafiel, a character in Nemesis by Agatha Christie
- Rafiel is a character in the video game Fire Emblem: Radiant Dawn

== See also ==
- Raphael (disambiguation)
