= Raphael catfish =

Raphael catfish may refer to a number of different South American doradid catfish species:

- Chocolate Raphael catfish, two common aquarium fish:
  - Acanthodoras cataphractus
  - Acanthodoras spinosissimus
- Giant Raphael catfish, Megalodoras uranoscopus
- Marbled Raphael catfish, Amblydoras nauticus, a common aquarium fish that often is mislabelled as Amblydoras hancockii
- Spotted Raphael catfish, two aquarium fish:
  - Agamyxis albomaculatus
  - Agamyxis pectinifrons
- Striped Raphael catfish or Southern striped Raphael catfish, Platydoras costatus, a common aquarium fish
