= Rafi (name) =

Rafi (Arabic: رافع, romanized: rāfiʿ) is a male given name of Armenian, Iranian, Arabic, and Turkic origin. It is one of the names of Allah, stemming from the Arabic verb rafaʿa (رَفَعَ), meaning "to lift, to raise (something high)". It is distinct from another male name, Rafi (Arabic: رفيع, romanized: rafīʿ, meaning "exalted/grand/high"). Other common transcriptions include "Rafee", "Rafie", "Rafay" and "Raffy".

Raffi (Armenian: Րաֆֆի or Ռաֆֆի) is also an Armenian given name. It was popularized by the 19th-century author Hakob Melik Hakobian, who adopted it as his pen name.

Rafi (Hebrew: רפי) is also a given name and a common nickname amongst Jews for people named Rafael.

== People named Rafi ==
=== Last name ===
- Mirza Rafi Sauda, Urdu language poet
- Mohammed Rafi, Indian playback singer
- Mohammed Rafi (footballer), Indian footballer
- Rafi Usmani, Pakistani Deobandi scholar
- Muhammad Rafi, Dagestani historian of the 13th century

=== First name ===
==== Rafi ====
- Rafi al-Din Shirazi, Persian historian of the Sultanate of Bijapur (1540/41–1620)
- Rafi ibn al-Layth, Khurasani Arab leader of a rebellion against the Abbasid Caliphate in 806–809
- Rafi ibn Harthama (died 896), ruler of Khurasan (882–892)
- Rafi ud-Darajat (1699–1719), tenth Mughal emperor (for three months)
- Rafi ud-Daulat, birth name of Shah Jahan II (1696–1719), briefly Mughal emperor in 1719, elder brother of Rafi Ul-Darjat
- Rafi Ahmed Kidwai, Indian politician
- Rafi Amit, Israeli poker player
- Rafi Cohen (born 1965), Israeli soccer player and coach
- Rafi Eitan, Israeli politician
- Rafi Escudero, musician, singer and poet from Puerto Rico
- Rafi Gavron, British actor
- Rafi Greenberg, senior lecturer in archaeology at Tel Aviv University
- Rafi Khawar, Pakistani actor
- Rafi Manoukian, former member of the city council in Glendale, California
- Rafi Melnick, Israeli economist and academic administrator
- Rafi Menco (born 1994), Israeli basketball player
- Rafi Pitts, Iranian film director
- Rafi Yoeli, Israeli inventor
- Rafi Zabor, American musician and novelist
- Sultan Rafi Sharif Bey, pioneer in development of Islamic culture in the United States, born Yale Jean Singer
- Rafi and Mecartin, director duo in Malayalam films
- Rafi Peretz, Israeli rabbi and politician

==== Raffi ====
- Raffi Ahmad, (born 1987), Indonesian celebrity artist
- Raffi Lavie (1937–2007), Israeli artist
- Raffi Torres (born 1981), Canadian professional ice hockey player

==== Raffi (Armenian) ====
- Raffi, full name Raffi Cavoukian (born 1948), Canadian singer-songwriter known for his children's music
- Raffi (novelist) (1835-1888), pen name of the Armenian author of Hakop Melik Hakopian
- Raffi Armenian (born 1942), Canadian conductor, pianist, composer, and teacher
- Raffi Boghosian (born 1990), Iraqi broadcast journalist and TV host
- Raffi Boghosyan, or Raffi, (born 1993), Bulgarian singer

== In fiction ==
- Rafi Tusk, a recurring character from the prime video animated series The adventures of rocky and bullwinkle

== See also ==
- Rafi (disambiguation)
- Raffi (disambiguation)
- "Raffie", nickname of Raphael Wallace (born 1957), Nevisian former cricketer
- Mohammed Rafie (born 1946), former Minister of Defense and a vice-president of the Democratic Republic of Afghanistan
