= Raffaele =

Raffaele (Italian: [raffaˈɛːle]) is an Italian given name and surname, and a variant of the name Raphael. Notable people with the name include:

== Given name ==
- Raffaele Amato (born 1965), Italian mobster
- Raffaele Bendandi (1893–1979), Italian clockmaker
- Raffaele Belliazzi, Italian sculptor and painter
- Raffaele Caravaglios (1864–1941), Italian bandmaster
- Raffaele Cutolo (1941–2021), Italian mobster
- Raffaele Ganci (1932–2022), Italian mobster
- Raffaele Cantone (born 1963), Italian magistrate
- Raffaele Contigiani (1920–2008), Italian architect
- Raffaele Di Gennaro (born 1993), Italian footballer
- Raffaele De Rosa (born 1987), Italian motorcycle racer
- Raffaele Di Paco (1908–1996), Italian cyclist
- Raffaele Fitto (born 1969), Italian politician
- Raffaele Guariglia (1889–1970), Italian politician
- Raffaele Lombardo (born 1950), Italian politician
- Raffaele Palladino (born 1984), Italian footballer
- Raffaele Pinto (1945–2020), Italian racing driver
- Raffaele Piria (1814–1865), Italian chemist
- Raffaele Pisu (1925–2019), Italiano actor
- Raffaele Riario (1461–1521), Italian cardinal
- Raffaele Rossetti (1881–1951), Italian politician
- Raffaele Carlo Rossi (1876–1948), Italian cardinal
- Raffaele Viviani (1888–1950), Italian artist

== Surname ==
- Giuseppe Raffaele (born 1975), Italian association football coach and former player
- Virginia Raffaele (born 1980), Italian actress

== See also ==
- Raphael (disambiguation)
- Rafael (disambiguation)
- San Raffaele (disambiguation)
- Raffaello (disambiguation)
