= La Entrada al Pacífico =

Coordinates: 31.6160°N 104.8975°W

La Entrada al Pacífico is a trade corridor designated as "Trade Corridor 56" by the Intermodal Surface Transportation Efficiency Act. The corridor is an international project between Mexico and the United States as a route from the Pacific Ocean port of Topolobampo in the Mexican state of Sinaloa to the U.S. state of Texas and beyond by way of the Midland-Odessa area. There is also a proposed upgrade of the rail connection, which might be easier by not requiring the addition of new bridges and tunnels in the Barranca de Cobre region. Its canyons are comparable in depth to the Grand Canyon in the United States.

== Route ==
=== Mexican section ===
Initially proposed in 1997, this cooperative U.S. - Mexico trade route would begin in Topolobampo, Sinaloa, and travel along Federal Highway 23 which as of July 2016, effectively ends at Choix. From there, the route is intended to travel through San Rafael, on currently-nonexistent roads that were supposed to have been finished by 2010. From San Rafael, the route would continue to the state capital, Chihuahua. The corridor then follows the newest section of highway to the border crossing of Ojinaga/Presidio.

=== American section ===
The route continues from Presidio on U.S. Route 67 (US 67) to the Interstate 10 (I-10) interchange. It then follows I-10/US 67 until US 67 goes north off the interstate and intersects US 385. The route then follows US 385 to Odessa, Texas at I-20. It then follows I-20 east to FM 1788 south of Midland International Airport. It follows FM 1788 north to the proposed SH 349 reliever route to the main highway north of Midland. The final leg of the highway follows SH 349 to Lamesa.

=== Alternate sections ===
==== Lamesa to Amarillo ====
From Lamesa, the corridor follows US 87 to Lubbock and then it follows I-27 from Lubbock to Amarillo.

==== Midland to Fort Worth and Dallas ====
From the FM 1788 junction, the route follows I-20 to Fort Worth and Dallas.

==== Midland to Wichita Falls ====
From the FM 1788 junction, the route follows I-20 to Abilene. Then, the route follows US 277 to Wichita Falls

== Impacts to Midland/Odessa ==
Midland-Odessa stands to benefit greatly from this trade corridor. Plans include an inland port by Union Pacific and other facilities.

== Support ==
The major support from Midland-Odessa comes from the organization, MOTRAN (Midland-Odessa Transportation Alliance). There is also some support from the governor of the Mexican state of Chihuahua.

The initial project was conceived to assist local Mexican power companies in the regional conversion from coal to natural gas, increase efficiency of import/export logistics as well as promoting and expanding trade between the neighboring nations.

== Opposition ==
Citizens from the Big Bend area of West Texas have voiced their opinion that a larger highway through the area would damage the beauty of the area. The lack of support has prompted TXDOT to find reliever routes around cities in the area.

== See also ==
- Ferromex, A rail alternative to highways on the Mexican side
- Texas Pacifico Transportation, A rail alternative to highways on the US side to the Union Pacific
