= Raphael (surname) =

Rafael, Raphael or Raphaël, is a common surname.

Notable people with the name include.

== Rafael ==
- Daniel Rafael (born 1961), Canadian male curler and curling coach

== Raphael ==
=== A ===
- Adam Raphael (born 1938), English journalist
- Alexander Raphael (before 1835 – 1850), British-Armenian Member of Parliament
- Allan Raphael (1931–2018), Canadian field hockey player who competed in the 1964 Summer Olympics

=== B ===
- Bertram Raphael (born 1936), American computer scientist
- Beverley Raphael (1934–2018), Australian psychiatrist

=== C ===
- Charlie Raphael (active from 1978), U.S. soccer player

=== D ===
- Dennis Raphael (active from 1972), American academic in the field of health policy and management

=== F ===
- Frederic Raphael (born 1931), American born writer resident in England

=== G ===
- Gerrianne Raphael (born 1935), American actress and voice actor
- Gordon Raphael (born before 1989), American record producer and musician
- Gordon Raphael (RAF officer) (1915–1945), Canadian flying ace
- Günter Raphael (1903–60), German composer

=== H ===
- Herbert Raphael (1859–1924), British barrister and Liberal Party politician
- Hillary Raphael (born 1976), American novelist

=== J ===
- Jean-Claude Raphael (born 1973), Mauritian judoka
- Joseph Raphael (1869–1950), American Impressionist painter
- June Diane Raphael (born 1980), American actress, comedian, and screenwriter

=== K ===
- Kendrick Raphael (born 2003), American football player
- KOSEKI Aquila Raphael (active from 1990), Japanese producer, story architect and Jungian scholar

=== L ===
- Lawrence Raphael (active from 1970), American academic in the field of speech production and perception
- Lennox Raphael (born 1939), Trinidadian journalist, poet, and playwright
- Lenore Raphael (birth name Lenore Hyams, born 1942), American jazz pianist and educator

=== M ===
- Max Raphael (1889–1952), German-American art historian
- Max Raphael (born 1956), stage name of Lloyd Sherr, American voice actor
- Mickey Raphael (born 1951), American harmonica player

=== N ===
- Nick Raphael (born 1971), British music industry executive
- Nicola Ann Raphael (1985–2001), Scottish schoolgirl

=== R ===
- Ralph Raphael (1921–98), British organic chemist
- Ray Raphael (born 1943), American historian and author

=== S ===
- Sally Jessy Raphael (birth name Sally Lowenthal, born 1935), American talk show host
- Sarah Raphael (1960–2001), English artist
- Sylvia Raphael

=== T ===
- Tsuriel Raphael (born 1952), Israeli diplomat

=== W ===
- William Raphael (1833–1914), Canadian artist
- Winifred Raphael (1898–1978), British occupational psychologist

=== Y ===
- Yuval Raphael (Born 2000), Israeli singer

== Raphaël ==
- Antonietta Raphaël (1895–1975), Italian sculptor and painter
- Farid Raphaël (1933–2014), Lebanese economist and banker

== See also ==
- Raphael (given name)
- Raphael (disambiguation)
- Rafael (disambiguation)
