= San Raffaele =

San Raffaele may refer to:

- Saint Raphael in the Italian language
- San Raffaele Hospital, a hospital in Milan, Italy
- Vita-Salute San Raffaele University, a university in Milan, Italy
- San Raffaele Cimena, a municipality in the province of Turin, Italy
- Chiesa dell'Angelo San Raffaele (Venice), a church in Venice, Italy

== See also ==
- Raffaele
