= Saint Raphael =

Saint Raphael often refers to Raphael the Archangel.

Saint Raphael, Saint-Raphaël, or St. Raphael may also refer to:

== Saints ==
=== Eastern Orthodox ===
- Raphael of Lesbos (died 1463), abbot and new martyr
- Raphael of Banat (fl. 17th century), Serbian monk
- Raphael of Brooklyn (1860–1915), Syrian Arab hierarch who was the first Eastern Orthodox bishop in the United States
- Raphael of Šišatovac (1875–1941), or Rafailo Momčilović, Serbian monk, prior of Šišatovac Monastery and new hieromartyr

== Places ==
- Saint-Raphaël, Quebec, a village in the Bellechasse Regional County Municipality, Quebec, Canada
- Saint-Raphaël-sur-Mer, part of Ste-Marie-St-Raphaël, on Lamèque Island, New Brunswick, Canada
- Saint-Raphaël, Dordogne, a community in the Dordogne département of France
- Saint-Raphaël, Var, a community in the Var département of France
- Saint-Raphaël Arrondissement, an arrondissement in Nord department, Haiti
- Saint-Raphaël, Haiti, a commune in Nord department, Haiti
- St Raphael's Estate, London, UK
- St. Raphael Provincial Park, Ontario, Canada

== Church establishments ==
- Saint Raphael's Cathedral, Madison, Wisconsin, a Catholic parish in Madison, Wisconsin, USA
- Saint Raphael Catholic Church (Koloa, Hawaii), a Catholic parish in Hawaii, USA
- St. Raphael's Cathedral (Dubuque, Iowa), a Catholic parish in Iowa, USA
- St. Raphael the Archangel Catholic Church, a Catholic church and school in Raleigh, North Carolina, USA
- Church of St. Raphael the Archangel, Vilnius, a Catholic church in Vilnius, Lithuania

== Institutions ==
- Collège Saint-Raphaël, now Collège de Montréal, a secondary school in Montreal, Quebec, Canada
- St. Raphael Academy, a Catholic secondary school in Pawtucket, Rhode Island, USA
- Hospital of Saint Raphael, a hospital in New Haven, Connecticut, USA
- Saint Raphael Hospital, former hospital, housed in the Thompson-Fasbender House, Hastings, Minnesota, USA
- Saint Raphael the Archangel Catholic School, a K-8 private school in Raleigh, North Carolina, USA
- Campus Saint-Raphael, UZ Leuven, part of the academic hospital

== Transport ==
- St. Raphael (aircraft) - aircraft used for a transatlantic crossing attempt in 1927

== Sport ==
- Saint-Raphaël (cycling team), a French cycling team that existed from 1954 to 1964, sponsored by the Saint-Raphaël apéritif drink

== Food and drink ==
- Saint-Raphaël (apéritif), a French apéritif brand

== See also ==
- Raphael (disambiguation)
- San Rafael (disambiguation)
