= Raffy =

Raffy is a name, a given name and a nickname. It may refer to:

- Antoine Louis Raffy (1868-1931), French organist and composer
- Louis Raffy (1855-1910), French mathematician
- Rafael Palmeiro (born 1964), Cuban former Major League Baseball player
- Ken Raffensberger (1917–2002), American Major League Baseball pitcher
- Raffaella Rossi (born 1974), Italian ski mountaineer and skyrunner
- Raffy Shart, French-Armenian theater director and writer, film director and screenwriter, composer and songwriter
- Raffy Tima (born 1975), Filipino anchor, producer and television host
- Raffy Tulfo (born 1960), Filipino senator, host and former broadcast journalist

== See also ==
- Rafael Betancourt (born 1975), Venezuelan Major League Baseball right-handed pitcher nicknamed "Raffy Right" by Cleveland Indians fans
- Rafael Pérez (baseball) (born 1982), Mexican League Baseball and Major League Baseball left-handed pitcher nicknamed "Raffy Left" by Cleveland Indians fans
- Raphy Reyes (born 1987), Philippine Basketball Association player
- Raffi (disambiguation)
- Raffey Cassidy (born 2001), British actress
