= Raffaellino =

Raffaellino is a given name. Notable people with the name include:

- Raffaellino del Colle, Italian Mannerist painter active mostly in Umbria
- Raffaellino del Garbo, Florentine painter of the early Renaissance
- Raffaellino da Reggio, Italian Mannerist style painter from Reggio Emilia

== See also ==
- Raffaello (disambiguation)
