= Mario Aguiñada Carranza =

Salvadoran politician (1942–2015)

Mario Aguiñada Carranza (1942 – 25 August 2015) was a Salvadoran activist and politician. He became politically active during his student years and joined the Communist Party of El Salvador. In the 1970s he became Secretary General of the Nationalist Democratic Union. During the Salvadoran Civil War he was on the side of the Farabundo Martí National Liberation Front and served as a diplomatic representative. Aguiñada Carranza was member of the Legislative Assembly of El Salvador between 1991 and 1994.

== Career ==
Aguiñada Carranza was born in 1942 in Sonsonate. Aguiñada Carranza became politically active during his student years. In 1958 he took part in the Asociación de la Juventud 5 de Noviembre, protesting against President José María Lemus. Two years later he became member of the Communist Party of El Salvador and in 1964 he became member of the national directive.

In the 1970s he became Secretary General of the Nationalist Democratic Union (Unión Democrática Nacionalista, (UDN)). In 1975 his brother, Rafael, was assassinated.

In October 1980, one year after the start of the Salvadoran Civil War, several revolutionary parties, including the Communist Party, merged into the Farabundo Martí National Liberation Front (FMLN). Together with fellow communist party members Schafik Handal and Américo Araujo he became member of the unified high command of the FMNL, the Dirección Revolucionaria Unificada. In 1981 he was target of an assassination attempt and fled the country. Between 1984 and 1988 he served in a diplomatic position for the FMLN and spent time abroad. He was part of the peace talks to end the civil war for the Frente Democrático Revolucionario and later served on the Comisión de la Consolidación de la Paz.

In the 1991 elections he was elected to the Legislative Assembly of El Salvador and served until 1994, for the UDN or Convergencia Democrática.

Aguiñada Carranza died on 25 August 2015, aged 73, after several years of poor health.
