= Acanthodoras depressus =

Conservation status
- Least Concern (IUCN 3.1)

Scientific classification
- Kingdom: Animalia
- Phylum: Chordata
- Class: Actinopterygii
- Order: Siluriformes
- Family: Doradidae
- Genus: Acanthodoras
- Species: A. depressus

Binomial name
- Acanthodoras depressus (Steindachner, 1881)

Synonyms
- Doras depressus Steindachner, 1881

Species of fish

Acanthodoras depressus is a species of thorny catfish found in the upper Orinoco River basin in Venezuela and Colombia, and in the Rio Negro basin in Brazil. This species grows to 8.1 cm (3.2 in) in SL
