= Raphaël (given name) =

Raphaël is a French masculine given name, and a cognate of Raphael. Notable people with the name include:

- Raphaël Alibert (1887–1963), French politician
- Raphaël Astier (born 1976), French modern pentathlete
- Raphaël Bretton (1920–2011), French set decorator
- Raphaël Chaume, French rugby union footballer
- Raphaël Domjan, Swiss explorer
- Raphaël Enthoven, French philosopher
- Raphaël Garcia (born 1999), Canadian soccer player
- Raphaël Géminiani (1925–2024), French road bicycle racer
- Raphaël Haroche (born 1975), French singer, known by the mononym Raphaël
- Raphaël Ibañez (born 1973), French rugby union footballer
- Raphaël Jacquelin (born 1974), French golfer
- Raphaël Lakafia (born 1988), French rugby union footballer
- Raphaël Lévy, trading card game player
- Raphaël Martinetti, Swiss businessman and President of the International Federation of Associated Wrestling Styles
- Raphaël Nadé (born 1980), Ivorian-French footballer
- Raphaël Nadjari (born 1971), French-Israeli writer and film and television director
- Raphaël Piolanti (born 1967), French hammer thrower
- Raphaël Poirée (born 1974), French biathlete
- Raphaël Poulain (born 1980), French rugby union footballer
- Raphaël Pujazon (1918–2000), French athlete and Olympian
- Raphaël Rouquier (born 1969), French mathematician
- Raphaël Salem (1898–1963), Greek-Sephardic mathematician
- Raphaël Schellenberger (born 1990), French politician
- Raphaël Varane (born 1993), French footballer
- Raphaël Wicky (born 1977), Swiss footballer
