= Sheizaf Rafaeli =

Israeli researcher (born 1955)

- שיזף רפאלי
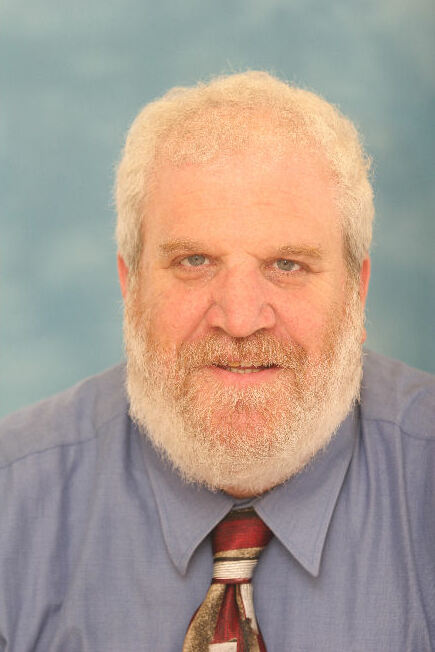
- Born: June 7, 1955 (age 71); Israel
- Occupations: CMC expert, professor
- Spouse: Anat Rafaeli

Academic work
- Main interests: Computers as Media, E-Learning, Management, E-Government, E-Politics, Information
- Website: rafaeli.net

Sheizaf Rafaeli (Hebrew: שיזף רפאלי; born June 7, 1955) is an Israeli researcher, scholar of computer-mediated communication and newspaper columnist. He is professor and dean at the School of Management (Graduate School of Business Administration) Haifa GSB, University of Haifa Israel and additionally director of the Center for Internet Research Center for Internet Research and the Games for Managers Project. In the 1980s and 1990s he served as head of the Information Systems area at the Graduate School of business in the Hebrew University of Jerusalem. He is a senior research fellow at the Samuel Neaman Institute for National Policy, Technion.

== Biography ==
Sheizaf Rafaeli was born in kibbutz Maagan Michael, Israel, to a Jewish family. His maternal grandfather was Israeli Prime Minister, Levi Eshkol. He graduated from the Hebrew Reali School in Haifa. He served as an officer in the Israeli military in combat units; he was discharged in 1977. He received his B.A. from the University of Haifa, M.A. from Ohio State University, M.A., and Ph.D., Stanford University.

Sheizaf is married to Anat Rafaeli, they have three sons and live in Haifa, Israel.

== Academic and journalism career ==
Rafaeli was the educational director of the cadet school of the Hebrew Reali School in Haifa. He has written software and books on graphics, electronic spreadsheets and statistical analysis, and a textbook on information systems for the Open University. He is co-editor, (with Fay Sudweeks and Margaret McLaughlin), of Network and NetPlay: Virtual Groups on the Internet published by MIT Press, 1998. He served as co-coordinator of the international ProjectH. He served as founder and co-editor of The Journal of Computer-Mediated Communication, and initiated the SHIL (Citizen's Advice Board) online service. He is a member of several journal editorial boards, including those of JCMC, ITSharenet and IJKL. Rafaeli is a director of NPTech Israel, and of StartUpSeeds. He is also a member of the board at the Wikimedia Foundation.

Sheizaf is a member of the Stockholm International Challenge Jury for Information Systems' Projects. Sheizaf has held visiting research and teaching positions at Ohio State University, Michigan State University, IBM, Stanford University, Technion, College of Management Academic Studies, and the University of Michigan. His work on Interactivity and Virtual Community, published by MIT Press, JCMC, and Oxford University Press is widely cited in the Information, Computer-Mediated Communication, Internet and Communication Research literatures. Rafaeli's research covers issues of the Value of Information, Information Overload, Social Networks and Network Analysis, Information Sharing, and digital life.

From October 2006, he has served as chair of the School of Management (Business Administration), at the University of Haifa. Rafaeli is a member of the Scientific Management of the Learning in a Networked Society (LINKS) national Center of Research Excellence (ICORE), where he studies the role of online tools in learning, teaching and education.

He writes weekly columns for the Calcalist and Globes financial and business daily newspapers in Israel and the Ynet news site.

== Awards and recognition ==
- Young researcher award of the AERA
- 2006 WebAward
- "Angels in the Net" (Mlachim Bareshet") national award

== Published works ==
- Jones, G. Ravid, G. and Rafaeli S. (2004) Information Overload and the Message Dynamics of Online Interaction Spaces: A Theoretical Model and Empirical Exploration, Information Systems Research Vol. 15 Issue 2, pp. 194–210.
- Rafaeli, S. (1988). Interactivity: From new media to communication. In R. P. Hawkins, J. M. Wiemann, & S. Pingree (Eds.), Sage Annual Review of Communication Research: Advancing Communication Science: Merging Mass and Interpersonal Processes, 16, 110–134. Beverly Hills: Sage.
- Rafaeli, S. and Ariel, Y. (2007) "Assessing Interactivity in Computer-Mediated Research", in Joinson, A.N., McKenna, K.Y.A., Postmes, T. and Rieps, U.D. (Eds.) The Oxford Handbook of Internet Psychology, Oxford University Press, (Chapter 6, pp. 71–88) 2007 (Final Draft PDF)
