= Raffael =

Raffael is a masculine given name and is a cognate of Raphael. Notable people may refer to:

- Raffael or Raphael (1483–1520), Italian painter and architect
- Raffael (footballer), Brazilian footballer Raffael Caetano de Araújo (born 1985)
- Raffael Behounek (born 1997), Austrian footballer
- Raffaël Enault (born 1990), French film director, writer, and screenwriter
- Raffael Korte (born 1990), German footballer
- Raffael Schuster-Woldan (1870–1951), German painter and art professor
- Raffael Tonello (born 1975), Italian footballer

== See also ==
- Raphael (given name), given name
