= Rapolas =

- Gender: Male
- Name day: 24 October and 29 September

Origin
- Region of origin: Lithuania

Rapolas is a Lithuanian masculine given name, and is cognate of the name Raphael.

== Notable people with the name ==
- Rapolas Ivanauskas (born 1998), Lithuanian basketball player
- Rapolas Okulič-Kazarinas (1857–1919), Lithuanian Army major general
- Rapolas Šaltenis (1908–2007), Lithuanian journalist, author, translator, and teacher
- Rapolas Skipitis (1887–1976), Lithuanian politician and attorney
