= San Rafael Airport =

San Rafael Airport may refer to:

- San Rafael Airport (Argentina), a commercial airport located in San Rafael, Mendoza, Argentina (IATA: AFA, ICAO: SAMR)
- San Rafael Airport (Chile), in Los Andes, Chile (IATA: LOB, ICAO: SCAN)
- San Rafael Airport (Peru), in San Rafael, Peru (ICAO: SPRF)
- San Rafael Airport (Venezuela), in Tucupita, Venezuela (IATA: TUV, ICAO: SVTC)
- San Rafael Airport, a privately owned general aviation airport in San Rafael, California.
