= San Rafael railway station (Chihuahua) =

Train station in Chihuahua, Mexico

Coordinates: 27.4839°N 107.8895°W

San Rafael
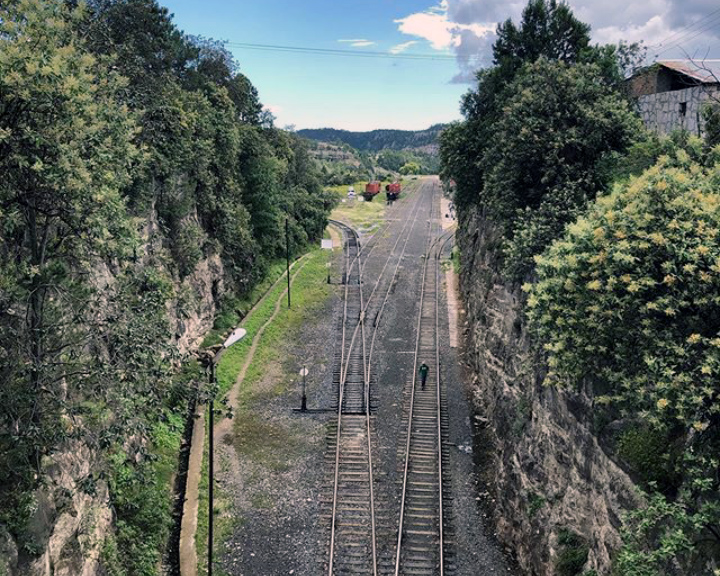

General information
- Location: San Rafael, Chihuahua; Mexico
- Owner: Ferromex
- Operator: Ferrocarril Chihuahua al Pacífico
- Platforms: 1
- Tracks: 4

Services
Preceding station	Ferromex	Following station
Cuiteco toward Los Mochis	Chepe Regional	Divisadero toward Chihuahua
Chepe Express does not stop here
Former services
Preceding station	N de M	Following station
Cuiteco toward Topolobampo	Ferrocarril Chihuahua al Pacífico	Ing. Francisco M. Togno toward Ojinaga
Location

San Rafael is a train station located in San Rafael, Chihuahua, Mexico.

== History ==
In 1940, the federal government of Mexico acquired the rights to the Kansas City, Mexico and Orient Railway, and on May 27, 1952, it took possession of the line operated by the Mexico North Western Railway. In 1955, the federal government merged the two lines to form the Ferrocarril Chihuahua al Pacífico. When this was completed in 1961, they connected Ciudad Juárez, Ojinaga and the city of Chihuahua with Topolobampo on the Pacific coast by rail.
