= Raffaella Corrales =

Spanish politician (born 1963)

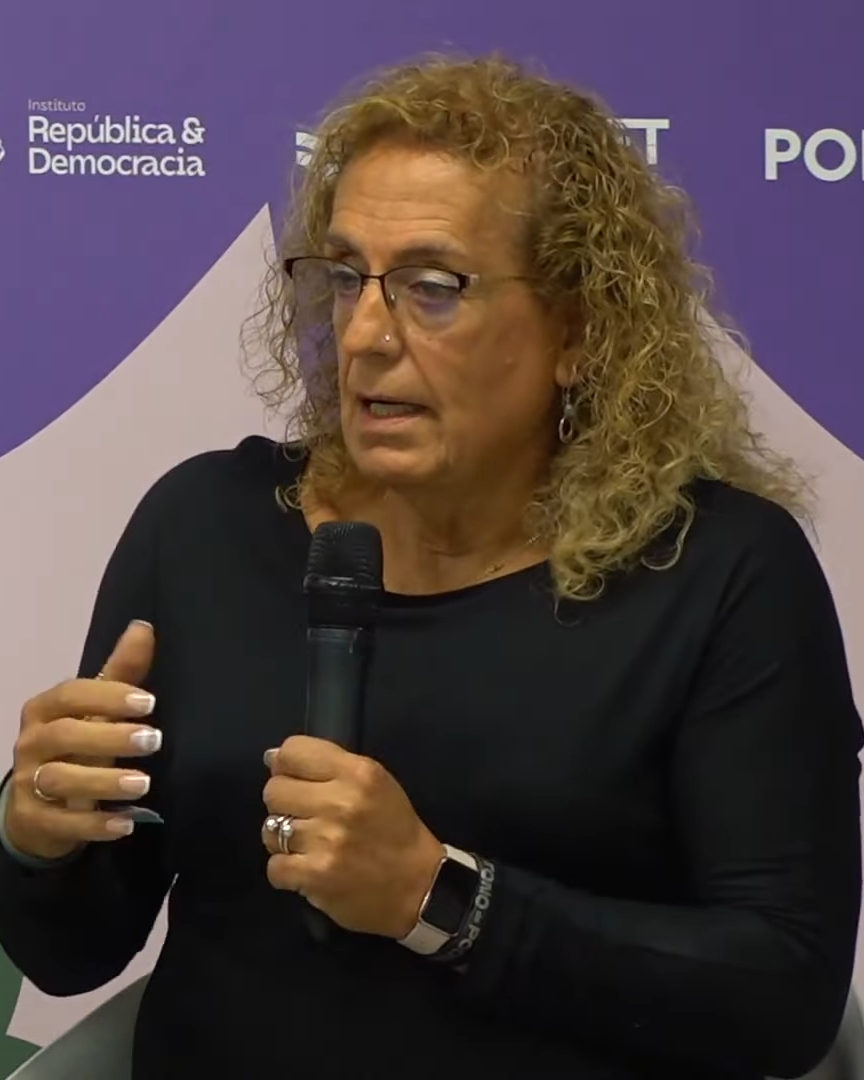
- Corrales in 2022
- Born: 1963 (age 62–63); Madrid, Spain
- Occupations: politician; LGBTQ+ rights activist
- Political party: Podemos

Raffaella Corrales Grande (born 1963) is a Spanish politician and LGBTQ rights activist. She currently serves as a member of the Guadalajara Feminist Platform and as co-president of EACEC LGTBI.

== Life and career ==
Corrales came out as transgender publicly in 2018 at the age of 55, though she had known years prior. She is a member of Podemos, a left-wing political party.

Between 2019 and 2023, Rafaella was a councilor for Tórtola de Henares, Guadalajara, as well as LGBTI secretary of Podemos in Castilla-La Mancha.

In 2021, she was involved in the March 2021 hunger strike, which advocated for the passing and implementation of Ley Trans, which would allow transgender people in Spain to legally change their gender via self-determination.

In 2022, after announcing her candidacy for mayor of Guadalajara, Corrales was the victim of attempted ridicule by journalist Javier Negre, who referred to her using quotation marks around the word "candidate." After this, Corrales received public support from the then Minister of Equality Irene Montero, the Secretary of State Ángela Rodríguez and regional coordinator José Luis García.

Corrales was a candidate for the Sumar party for the Congress of Deputies in the 2023 Spanish general election in Guadalajara. She was endorsed by Ione Belarra, the party leader of Podemos.
