= St. Raphael the Archangel Catholic Church =

Catholic church in Raleigh, North Carolina

Saint Raphael the Archangel Catholic Church
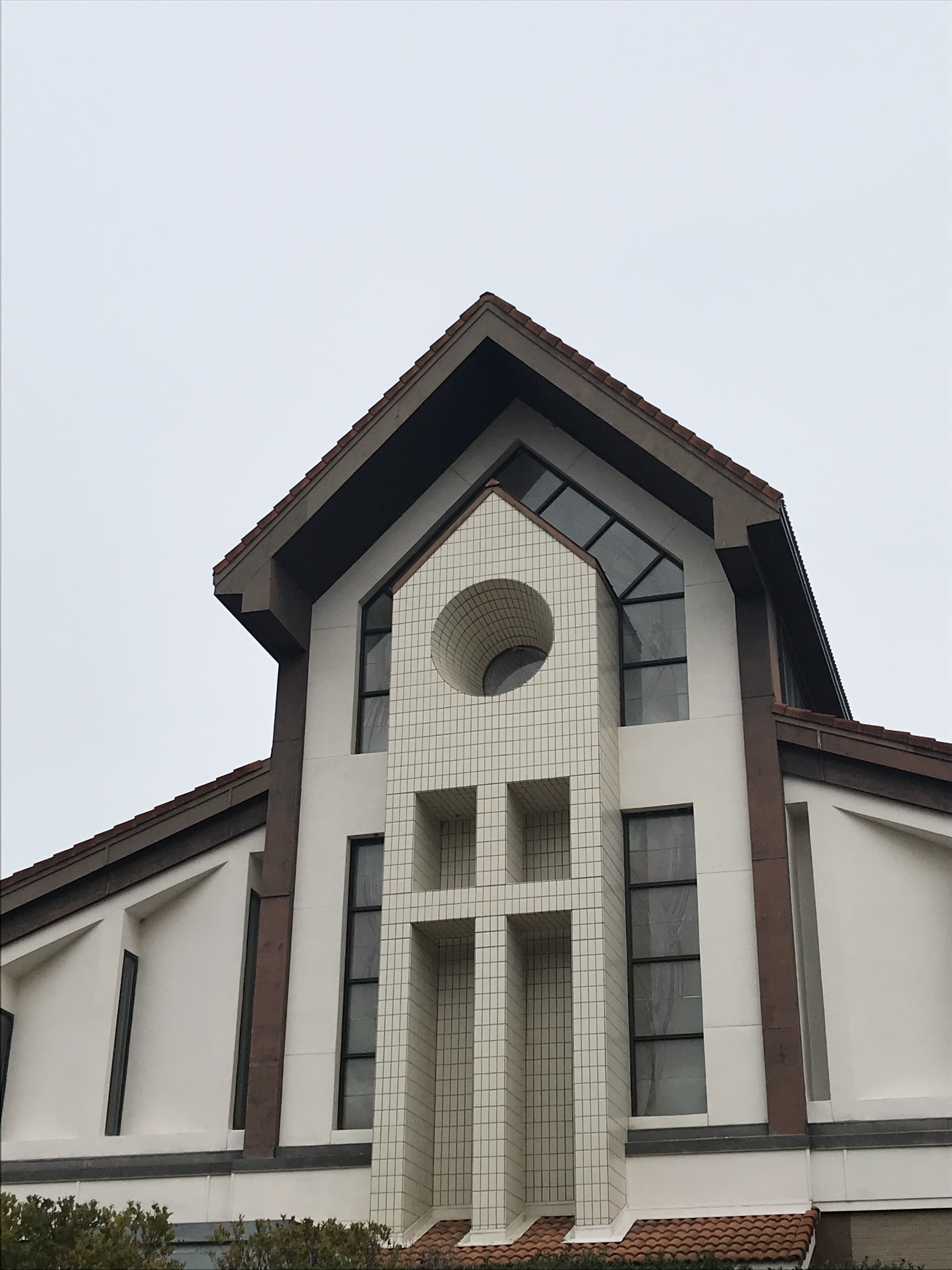

Religion
- Affiliation: Roman Catholic Church
- Diocese: Roman Catholic Diocese of Raleigh
- Leadership: Bishop Luis R. Zarama
- Status: Active

Location
- Location: Raleigh, North Carolina, United States
- State: North Carolina
- Interactive map of Saint Raphael the Archangel Catholic Church

Website
- www.saintraphael.org

Saint Raphael the Archangel Catholic Church is a Roman Catholic Jesuit parish located in Raleigh, North Carolina, United States.

St. Raphael is part of the Roman Catholic Diocese of Raleigh. The parish is also the host of Saint Raphael Catholic School. and Saint Raphael Catholic Preschool. The priests are members of the USA East Province of the Society of Jesus (the USA East Province was formed when the Maryland and USA Northeast provinces merged in 2020), the US Jesuit Portal, and Jesuits Worldwide.

== Church ==
Saint Raphael the Archangel Catholic Church was dedicated in 1966 to serve a growing Catholic population. In 1996 the Jesuits accepted pastorship of the parish. It is the only Jesuit Parish in the Diocese of Raleigh. In 1997 the parish started a Hispanic Ministry program and added Spanish Masses to the services. The main altar of St. Raphael contains a relic of St. Elizabeth Ann Seton. The altar in the church's Chapel of Our Lady Queen of the Americas contains relics of Blessed Miguel Pro and of St. Katharine Drexel.

== School ==
Saint Raphael Catholic School and Saint Raphael Catholic Preschool, hosted on the grounds of the church, offer pre-school as well as grades kindergarten through eight. The school feeds into Cardinal Gibbons Catholic High School. It is one of the only Jesuit administered schools in North Carolina.

=== Sports Department ===
Saint Raphael Catholic School has the following sports teams:

- Boys Soccer
- Girls Volleyball
- Boys Varsity and JV Basketball
- Girls Varsity and JV Basketball
- Boys Lacrosse
- Girls Soccer
- Boys Varsity Baseball
- Cheerleading

== See also ==
- List of Jesuit sites
- National Catholic Educational Association
