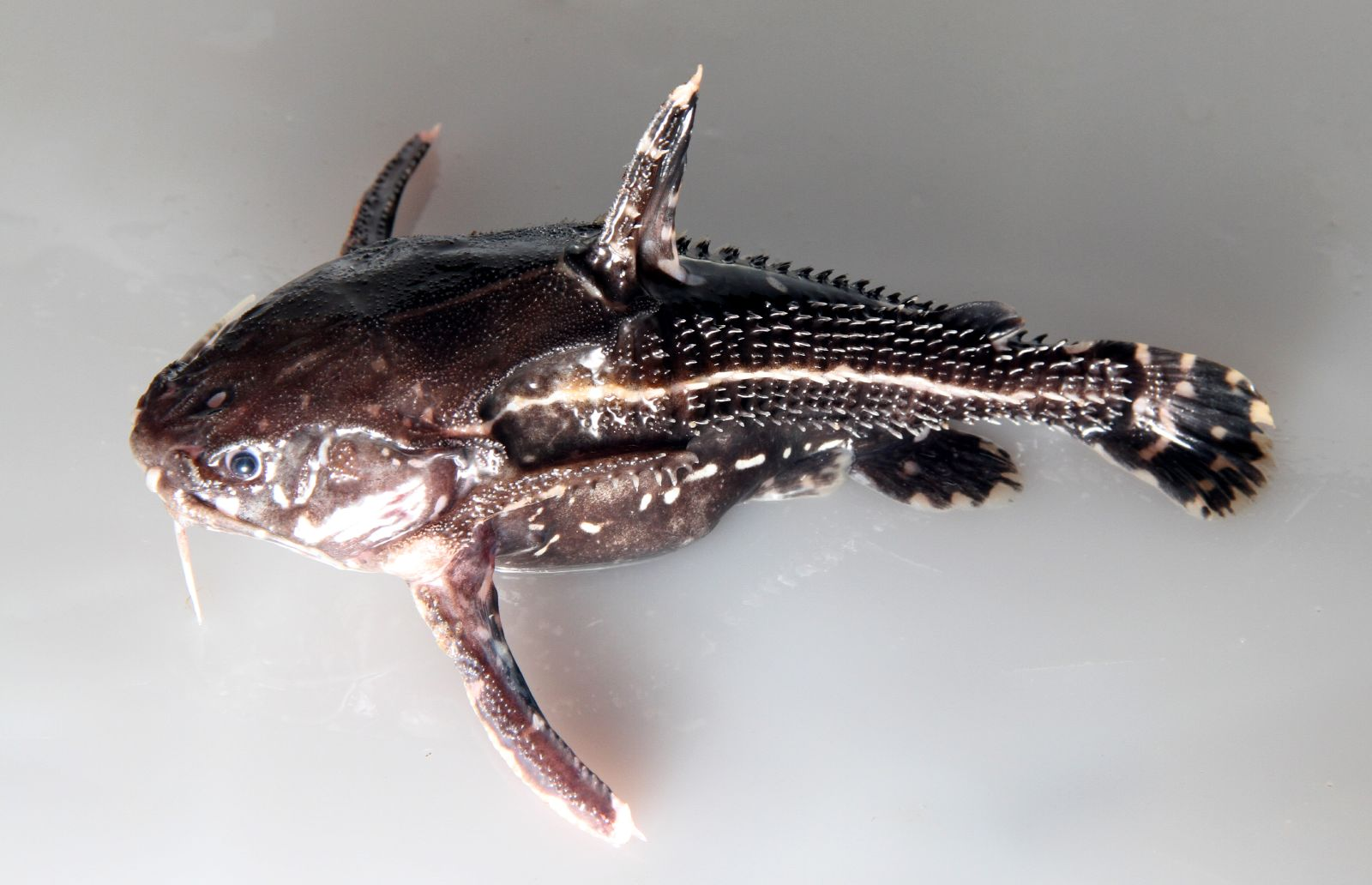
- Acanthodoras spinosissimus

Scientific classification
- Kingdom: Animalia
- Phylum: Chordata
- Class: Actinopterygii
- Order: Siluriformes
- Family: Doradidae
- Subfamily: Doradinae
- Genus: Acanthodoras; Bleeker, 1862

Type species
- Silurus cataphractus Linnaeus, 1758

= Acanthodoras =

Genus of fishes

Acanthodoras is a genus of thorny catfishes native to rivers of tropical South America.

== Species ==
There are currently 3 recognized species in this genus:

- Acanthodoras cataphractus (Linnaeus, 1758)
- Acanthodoras depressus (Steindachner, 1881)
- Acanthodoras polygramma (Kner, 1853)

Incertae sedis

- Acanthodoras spinosissimus (C. H. Eigenmann & R. S. Eigenmann, 1888) (Talking catfish)

== Appearance and anatomy ==
These catfish lack scales, but their bodies are armored with a lateral row of bony plates. The head is large and flattened. The mouth is terminal (points straight forward). There are three pairs of barbels and the eyes are small. There are no external sexual characteristics. The dorsal and pectoral fin spines are stiff and sharp and can inflict a painful wound.

== In the aquarium ==
Acanthodoras species may be kept as pet fish in the aquarium fish hobby.

They will accept a wide variety of foods. Due to their behavior of digging through the substrate for their food, sand or round gravel should be used to prevent damage to their barbels. There should be some shelter for these fish to hide under; once released into the aquarium, these fish may virtually never be seen again. This fish species is a peaceful, community resident. Breeding has been achieved in captivity. The parents were observed digging a depression in the substrate into which the eggs were deposited. The eggs were guarded by both fish. The eggs hatched after 4–5 days although unfortunately the young did not survive beyond the fry stage of development.

A. spinosissimus is similar to Platydoras cataphractus. These fish shun bright light and should be provided with adequate hiding places. This fish may live in an aquarium for months without being seen, hiding below rocks and burying itself in the substrate.
