= Raphael Schäfer (politician) =

German politician (born 1981)

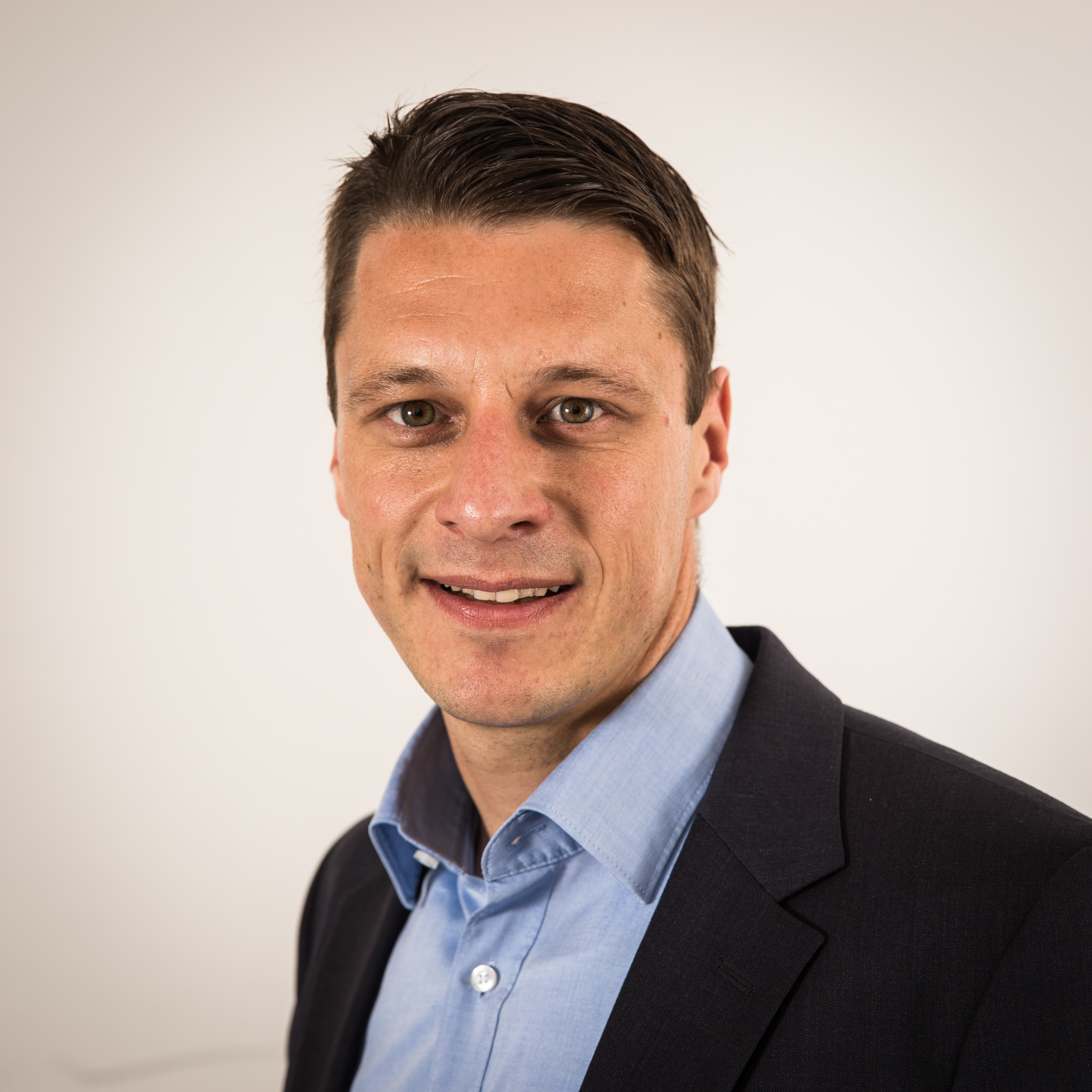
- Schäfer in 2017

Member of the Landtag of Saarland
- Incumbent
- Assumed office 25 April 2017
- Constituency: Saarlouis

Personal details
- Born: 6 March 1981 (age 45)
- Party: Christian Democratic Union (since 2007)

Raphael Peter Schäfer (born 6 March 1981) is a German politician serving as a member of the Landtag of Saarland since 2017. He has served as chief whip of the Christian Democratic Union since 2022.
