= Rafael Aguiñada Carranza =

Salvadoran politician (1930–1975)

Rafael Aguiñada Carranza (1930 or 10 August 1931 – 26 September 1975) was a Salvadoran activist and politician who was a member of the Legislative Assembly of El Salvador from 1974 onwards. He was assassinated on 26 September 1975.

== Life ==
Aguiñada Carranza was born in Sonsonate in 1930 or on 10 August 1931 to Mariano Aguiñada and Antonia Carranza de Aguiñada. He attended primary school Salvador Díaz Rodas in his home town. Shortly after finishing his primary school he started working in a carpentry workshop. Shortly afterwards he started working in a rail transport workshop in Las Palmeras. In 1946, aged 15, he witnessed a strike there which influenced him to become active in workers rights. He then first moved to Santa Tecla and later to San Salvador. In the capital city he studied architectural drawing and obtained a degree in 1955.

In 1972 Aguiñada Carranza was detained and tortured by the National Guard for 9 days. He was subsequently expelled to Managua, Nicaragua. After 40 days he managed to return to El Salvador. On 10 May 1973 Aguiñada Carranza, while active for the Federación Unitaria Sindical de El Salvador (FUSS), was arrested in front of the FUSS office and expelled from the country to Nicaragua, this time to Estelí. Aguiñada Carranza managed to return to El Salvador in 24 days.

In the March 1974 Salvadoran legislative election Aguiñada Carranza was elected to the Legislative Assembly of El Salvador for the Nationalist Democratic Union (UDN) for the constituency of San Salvador. As legislator he visited Hungary and Romania in November 1974 and Cuba in April 1975. On 26 September 1975, he was assassinated while driving his car through San Salvador. The car was shot at by multiple gunmen with machine guns. Another UDN legislator in Aguiñada Carranza's car survived the attack. At the time of the attack Aguiñada Carranza served as secretary general of the FUSS. He also was member of the political commission of the Communist Party of El Salvador and served as member of the secretariat of its central committee. During the later Salvadoran Civil War a unit of the Farabundo Martí National Liberation Front was named after him.

== Personal life ==
Aguiñada Carranza was married and had a daughter. His brother Oscar was killed in 1968. Another brother was Mario Aguiñada Carranza, who later also served as deputy.
