= Rafael (given name) =

Rafael is a masculine given name. It is a Portuguese and Spanish form of the Hebrew name Raphael. It translates to "God has healed" and "God heals" in Hebrew. Notable people with the name include:

== People ==
=== Arts and entertainment ===
- Rafael Amaya (born 1977), Mexican actor
- Rafael Araneda (born 1969), Chilean television personality
- Rafael Bittencourt (fl. 1991), Brazilian power metal composer and songwriter
- Rafael Frühbeck de Burgos (1933–2014), Spanish conductor and composer
- Rafael Kayanan (born 1962), Filipino-American artist
- Rafael Marín (born 1959), Spanish novelist, translator and comic book writer
- Rafaël Ouellet, Canadian film director
- Rafael L. Silva (born 1994), Brazilian-American actor

=== Politics ===
- Rafael Aguiñada Carranza (1930–1975), Salvadoran politician
- Rafael Correa (born 1963), former president of Ecuador
- Rafael Edward Cruz (born 1970), more commonly known as Ted Cruz, American politician
- Rafael Eitan (1929–2004), Israeli general, former Chief of Staff of the Israel Defense Forces, and politician
- Rafael Macias, American politician
- Rafael Pinochet Cáceres (1898–1989), Chilean politician
- Rafael Trujillo (1891–1961), former Dominican president

=== Sports ===
==== Association football ====
===== Brazilian =====
- Rafael Cabral (born 1990)
- Rafael Vágner Dias Silva (born 1983)
- Rafael Godoi Pereira (born 1985)
- Rafael Nascimento (born 1984)
- Rafael Pereira da Silva (footballer born 1980)
- Rafael Pereira da Silva (footballer born 1990)
- Rafael Pires Vieira (born 1978)
- Rafael Schmitz (born 1980)
- Rafael Sóbis (born 1985)
- Rafael Tolói (born 1990)

===== Mexican =====
- Rafael Baca (born 1989)
- Rafael Cuevas (born 1980), goalkeeper
- Rafael Figueroa (born 1983)
- Rafael Guerrero (born 2003)
- Rafael Márquez (born 1979), coach and former player
- Rafael Medina (born 1979)

===== Portuguese =====
- Rafael Barbosa (footballer, born 1996)
- Rafaël Dias (born 1991)
- Rafael Floro (born 1994)
- Rafael Leão (born 1999)
- Rafael Lopes (born 1991)
- Rafael Ramos (footballer) (born 1995)
- Rafael Veloso (born 1993), goalkeeper

===== Spanish =====
- Rafael Alkorta (born 1968)
- Rafael Benítez (born 1960), football manager and former player
- Rafael Gordillo (born 1957)
- Rafael Oramas (1904–1968)
- Rafael Wellington (born 1985)

===== Other nationalities =====
- Rafael Bianchi (born 1971), Uruguayan footballer
- Rafael Dudamel (born 1973), Venezuelan football manager and former goalkeeper
- Rafael Farfán (born 1975), Peruvian footballer
- Rafael Guarderas (born 1993), Peruvian footballer
- Rafael Haller (born 2000), Uruguayan footballer
- Rafael Kazior (born 1983), German footballer
- Rafael Mea Vitali (born 1975), Venezuelan footballer
- Rafael Monti (born 1999), Argentine footballer
- Rafael Robayo (born 1984), Colombian footballer
- Rafael Santos Borré (born 1995), Colombian footballer
- Rafael Struick (born 2003), Indonesian footballer
- Rafael Uiterloo (born 1990), Dutch footballer
- Rafael Urazbakhtin (born 1978), Kazakhstani football manager and former player
- Rafael van der Vaart (born 1983), Dutch footballer
- Rafael Zuviría (born 1951), Argentine footballer

==== Baseball ====
- Rafael Álvarez (baseball) (born 1977), Venezuelan baseball player
- Rafael Devers (born 1996), Dominican baseball player
- Rafael Dolis (born 1988), Dominican baseball player
- Rafael Figarola (1882–?), Cuban baseball player
- Rafael Furcal (born 1977), Dominican baseball player
- Rafael Montalvo (baseball) (born 1964), Puerto Rican baseball player
- Rafael Montero (baseball) (born 1990), Dominican baseball player
- Rafael Ortega (baseball) (born 1991), Venezuelan baseball player
- Rafael Palmeiro (born 1964), Cuban-American Major League Baseball player
- Rafael Pérez (baseball) (born 1982), Dominican baseball player
- Rafael Santana (born 1958), Dominican baseball player
- Rafael Soriano (born 1979), Dominican baseball player
- Rafael Ynoa (born 1987), Dominican baseball player

==== Boxing and martial arts ====
- Rafael Alves (fighter) (born 1990), Brazilian mixed martial artist
- Rafael dos Anjos (born 1984), Brazilian mixed martial artist
- Rafael Carbonell (born 1943), Cuban flyweight boxer
- Rafael Carvalho (born 1986), Brazilian mixed martial artist
- Rafael Cavalcante (born 1980), Brazilian mixed martial artist
- Rafael Cordeiro (born 1973), Brazilian mixed martial artist and coach
- Rafael Fiziev (born 1993), Azerbaijani mixed martial artist
- Rafael Guzmán (1986–2011), Mexican boxer
- Rafael Herrera (born 1945), Mexican boxer
- Rafael Iglesias (boxer) (1924–1999), Argentine boxer
- Rafael Lovera (1952–2023), Paraguayan boxer
- Rafael Natal (born 1982), Brazilian mixed martial artist
- Rafael Ramos (boxer) (born 1965), Puerto Rican boxer
- Rafael Rebello (born 1980), Brazilian mixed martial artist
- Rafael Ruelas (born 1979), Mexican boxer
- Rafael Silva (fighter) (born 1985), Brazilian mixed martial artist
- Rafael Silva (judoka) (born 1987), Brazilian judoka
- Rafael Zuñiga (born 1963), Colombian boxer

==== Car racing ====
- Rafael Câmara (born 2005), Brazilian racing driver
- Rafael Daniel (born 1983), Brazilian racing driver
- Rafael Sperafico (1981–2007), Brazilian racing driver
- Rafael Suzuki (born 1987), Brazilian racing driver
- Rafael Villagómez (born 2001), Mexican racing driver

==== Cycling ====
- Rafael Andriato (born 1987), Brazilian road cyclist
- Rafael Montero (cyclist) (1913–1962), Chilean cylcist
- Rafael Montiel (born 1981), Colombian road cyclist
- Rafael Silva (cyclist) (born 1990), Portuguese cyclist

==== Other sports ====
- Rafael Alarçón (born 1977), Brazilian squash player
- Rafael Alarcón (golfer) (born 1958), Mexican golfer
- Rafael Álvarez (diver) (born 1971), Spanish diver
- Rafael Araujo-Lopes (born 1996), American gridiron football player
- Rafael Arévalo (born 1986), Salvadoran tennis player
- Rafael Castro (born 2003), American basketball player
- Rafael Cerro (weightlifter) (born 1997), Colombian weightlifter
- Rafael Cerro (bullfighter) (born 1993), Spanish bullfighter
- Rafael Duk (born 1962/63), Mexican gridiron football player and coach
- Rafael Hechanova (1928–2021), Filipino basketball player
- Rafael López (handballer) (born 1953), Spanish handballer
- Rafael Nadal (born 1986), Spanish tennis player
- Rafael "Paeng" Nepomuceno (born 1957), Filipino bowler
- Rafael Pascual (volleyball) (born 1970), Spanish volleyball player
- Rafael Romero (1938–2021), Venezuelan sprinter
- Rafael Usín Guisado (born 1987), Spanish futsal player

=== Saints ===
- Rafael Arnáiz Barón (1911–1938), Spanish saint
- Rafael Guízar y Valencia (1878–1938), Mexican Roman Catholic bishop and saint

=== Other fields ===
- Rafael Caro Quintero (born 1952), Mexican former drug lord
- Rafael C. Castillo (fl. 1971), Mexican-American editor, author, and academician
- Rafael Spósito Balzarini (1952–2009), Uruguayan anarchist, sociologist, and journalist

== Fictional characters ==
- Rafael Barba, (Raúl Esparza) appearing on Law & Order: Special Victims Unit
- Rafael Solano, (Justin Baldoni), a principal character on Jane the Virgin
- Rafael, a toucan character in the animated film Rio, played by George Lopez
- Dr. Rafael Salazar, the late Argentinian father of the titular character of the 2010–2013 Cartoon Network show Generator Rex.
