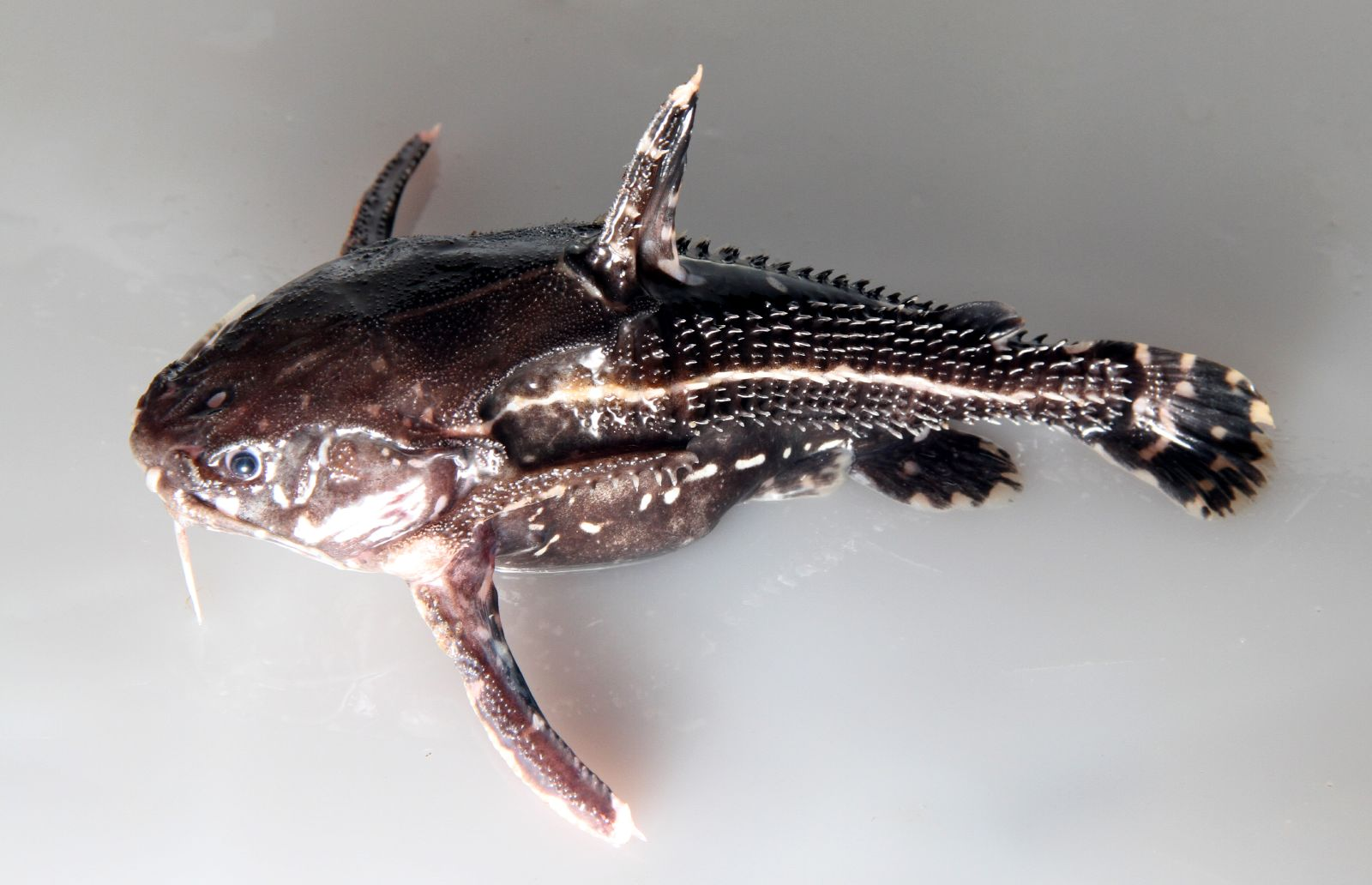

Scientific classification
- Kingdom: Animalia
- Phylum: Chordata
- Class: Actinopterygii
- Order: Siluriformes
- Family: Doradidae
- Genus: Acanthodoras
- Species: A. spinosissimus

Binomial name
- Acanthodoras spinosissimus (C. H. Eigenmann & R. S. Eigenmann, 1888)

Synonyms
- Doras spinosissimus C. H. Eigenmann & R. S. Eigenmann, 1888

= Acanthodoras spinosissimus =

Talking catfish

Species of fish

Acanthodoras spinosissimus, the talking catfish, is a species of thorny catfish found in the Amazon and Essequibo River basins, occurring in Brazil, Colombia, Guyana, and Peru. This species grows to 13.7 cm (5.4 in) in SL and can be found in the aquarium trade. This species is reported to produce toxic fluids.
