= Raffi M. Nazikian =

American physicist

Raffi M. Nazikian is a physicist known for his contributions to nuclear fusion research and plasma physics. He has been associated with the Princeton Plasma Physics Laboratory (PPPL) and has conducted significant work at the DIII-D National Fusion Facility.

In 1990, after completing his doctorate, Nazikian joined PPPL. Subsequently, he was stationed at the DIII-D National Fusion Facility in San Diego, a facility operated by General Atomics for the Department of Energy (DOE). Throughout his tenure at PPPL, Nazikian held several important roles, including leading the DIII-D Collaborations division and serving as the head of the ITER and Tokamak Department. In these roles, he was instrumental in developing initiatives and partnerships that addressed physics challenges on ITER, aiming to advance the technical foundation for U.S. fusion energy aspirations.

One of Nazikian's most notable contributions to the field is the development of a model predicting the challenges posed by Edge Localized Modes (ELMs) to tokamaks, including the international fusion experiment, ITER. Collaborating with scientists Qiming Hu and Jong-Kyu Park, Nazikian integrated distinct simulation codes, achieving a comprehensive understanding of ELM suppression using 3D fields. This research provided insights into the behavior of plasma, revealing that specific deformations in the plasma allow for the gradual release of heat, thus mitigating the risks of heat bursts. This understanding was key to demonstrating the role of minor magnetic fields in effectively counteracting ELMs.

== Awards and distinctions ==
He is a two-time recipient of the Kaul award, with his first recognition in 1998 being shared with fellow PPPL researcher Guoyong Fu. Furthermore, Nazikian has been elected as a fellow of the American Physical Society (APS) and has been designated as a distinguished APS lecturer.

== Life and education ==
Nazikian is originally from Australia. He completed his doctoral studies at the Australian National University in Canberra in 1990. From a young age, Nazikian showed an inclination towards scientific exploration, particularly in the realms of microscopy and astronomy. He resides in the San Diego area with his family.
