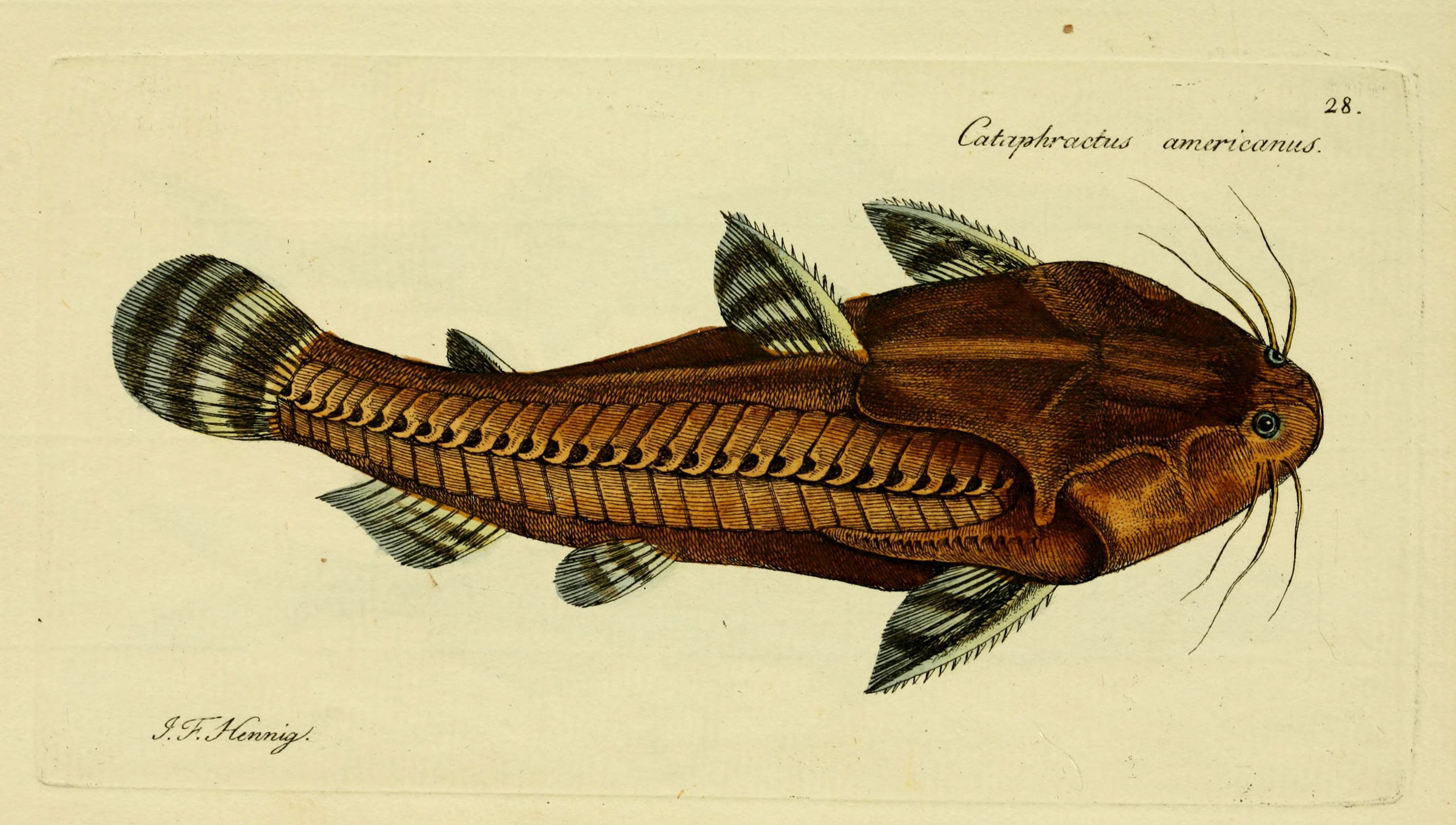

Scientific classification
- Kingdom: Animalia
- Phylum: Chordata
- Class: Actinopterygii
- Order: Siluriformes
- Family: Doradidae
- Genus: Acanthodoras
- Species: A. cataphractus

Binomial name
- Acanthodoras cataphractus (Linnaeus, 1758)

Synonyms
- Silurus cataphractus Linnaeus, 1758; Cataphractus americanus Bloch & Schneider, 1801; Doras blochii Valenciennes, 1840

= Spiny catfish =

Species of fish

Acanthodoras cataphractus more commonly Spiny catfish, is a species of thorny catfish found in rivers of Bolivia, Brazil, Colombia, French Guiana, Guyana, Peru, and Suriname. This species grows to 11.5 cm (4.5 in) in SL. This fish is found in the aquarium trade.

== Ecology ==
A. cataphractus is abundant in calm waters of swamps and mangroves. Omnivorous, they feed mainly on detritus; these fish search for food by digging in the sediment. They are of squat, tadpole-like shape, with a large, very ossified head that has three pairs of barbels, which are rather long. They are nocturnal animals active during twilight. Requires enough hiding places between roots and stones during the day. They lie hidden in the underwater roots and stocks. Eats worms and insect larvae, feed residues and artificial food. Prolonged temporary cooling, can burrow into the ground at lightning speed, that only the eyes look out, others emit growling noises, if you catch them out, reproduction is little explored, some species are to build nests, the Spiny catfish can become very old. They are able to produce sounds; every basic unit of the sound they emit when they move their pectoral spine lasts 100-200 milliseconds and has a frequency of 170-250 hertz. The barbels of the males are brown and yellowish white striated, the females monochrome yellowish white. The soil should be fine-grained and contain peat. When using gravel, the fish need at least a sand blanket, which is free of plants. A. cataphractus does not go to plants, but solid rooted sand blankets should be preferred.
