= Raffaella Bosurgi =

Editor-in-chief of Depression and Anxiety

Raffaella Bosurgi is a neuroscientist and the Editor in Chief of Depression and Anxiety.

== Education ==
Bosurgi has a master's degree in environmental technology from Imperial College London and a Ph.D in neuroscience from University College London and the University of Freiburg and a postdoctoral fellowship from EMBL in Rome.

== Career ==
Bosurgi worked as a postdoctoral researcher on anxiety and depression at the European Molecular Biology Laboratory in Rome before working for an Italian energy company on renewable energy projects in Italy and low income countries.

She has previously edited The Lancet Infectious Diseases and The Lancet Gastroenterology before becoming the first editor in chief for The Lancet Planetary Health from 2017 to 2019. She later worked at The BMJ as the quality improvement editor.

Bosurgi became the Executive Editor of PLOS Medicine in 2021.

As of 2026, she is Editor in Chief of Depression and Anxiety.

=== Selected publications ===
- Lukoye Atwoli, Abdullah H Baqui, Thomas Benfield, Raffaella Bosurgi, Fiona Godlee, Stephen Hancocks, Richard Horton, Laurie Laybourn-Langton, Carlos Augusto Monteiro, Ian Norman, Kirsten Patrick, Nigel Praities, Marcel G M Olde Rikkert, Eric J Rubin, Peush Sahni, Richard Smith, Nick Talley, Sue Turale, Damián Vázquez, Call for emergency action to limit global temperature increases, restore biodiversity, and protect health: Wealthy nations must do much more, much faster, Nutrition Reviews, Volume 79, Issue 11, November 2021, Pages 1183–1185, https://doi.org/10.1093/nutrit/nuab067
