= Ron Raffaelli =

American photographer (1943–2016)

- Born: September 20, 1943
- Died: November 7, 2016 (aged 73)
- Education: Art Center College of Design
- Occupation: Photographer

Ron Raffaelli (September 20, 1943 – November 7, 2016) was an American photographer known for his documenting rock music icons in the 1960s and 1970s, such as Jimi Hendrix, for whom Raffaelli acted as official photographer in 1968. Raffaelli is known also for his fine art and erotic photography. His work has appeared in hundreds of magazine layouts, 50 album covers, over 40 posters, in six books and in public exhibitions.

== Career ==
Raffaelli graduated from the Art Center College of Design in Southern California in 1967 with a bachelor's degree in Advertising Photography. At age 22, he was summoned to a Beverly Hills estate by Jimi Hendrix: "An art director had told me that this British rock star was getting ready to go on tour in the United States, and he needed a photographer. So I went up to this Beverly Hills house to show my portfolio, and when I got there, there were about thirty or forty photographers with their portfolios. When my turn came, I went into this bedroom and there was a Tiffany lamp with red scarves hanging from it, and at the foot of the bed, there was this handsome black man with a blond on either side of him, and one behind him on the bed. I recognized who it was, it was Jimi Hendrix. And he went through all thirty of my photos in about thirty seconds. He hands them back to me and says thank you. I left, thinking ‘what a waste of time that was.’ A couple of weeks later, I got the call that Jimi chose me, and the next morning I was on a plane to Hawaii to join him." In the mid 1970s, Raffaelli went on to pursue other venues in fine art photography, films and print.

In 2011, Raffaelli released his first museum-quality Fine Art Prints from his vast collection, which he kept in storage for 40 years. Andrew Kirby, Executive Producer of The RARE Collections commented, "This is an important event in Rock Music History. There has never been an opportunity for collectors to view and purchase these unseen archives, much less meet Ron in person and hear the fascinating stories behind each incredible image." In October 2011, the Arlington Convention Center in Arlington, Texas held an exhibit of Raffaelli's work.

Ron died on November 7, 2016.

== Legal activity ==
Raffaelli was one of the plaintiffs in Ashcroft v. Free Speech Coalition 535 U.S. 234 (2002) a Supreme Court case that struck down two overbroad provisions of the Child Pornography Prevention Act of 1996 because they abridged "the freedom to engage in a substantial amount of lawful speech." Raffaelli's co-plaintiffs included the Free Speech Coalition, Bold Type, Inc., a publisher of a book advocating the nudist lifestyle, and Jim Gingerich, a painter of nudes.

== Media appearances ==
In December 2011, Raffaelli appeared in "Looney Dunes", a fifth season episode of the History reality television series Pawn Stars. In the episode, star Rick Harrison was summoned to the Art Encounter gallery in Las Vegas, where he met Raffaelli, who was seeking to market a collection of unpublished photographs of Jimi Hendrix from his archives. Harrison purchased the collection for $15,000.

== Books ==
- Rapture: 13 Erotic Fantasies Photographed by Raffaelli by Ron Raffaelli and Steve Hull (1975). ASIN: B000ZC7WQI
- Desire. a Collection of Erotic Photography by Ron Raffaelli. Diverse Industries (1976). ASIN: B000H5ELVC
- I Am My Lover: Women Pleasure Themselves by Joani Blank, Ron Raffaelli, Michael A. Rosen, Victoria Heilweil, Craig Morey, Annie Sprinkle. Down There Press (July 1997). ISBN 0-940208-18-0 ISBN 978-0940208186
- Passion: An Erotic Portfolio by Ron Raffaelli. Chatsworth Press. ISBN 0-917181-10-7 / 9780917181108 / 0-917181-10-7
