= Raffi Boghosian =

Iraqi journalist

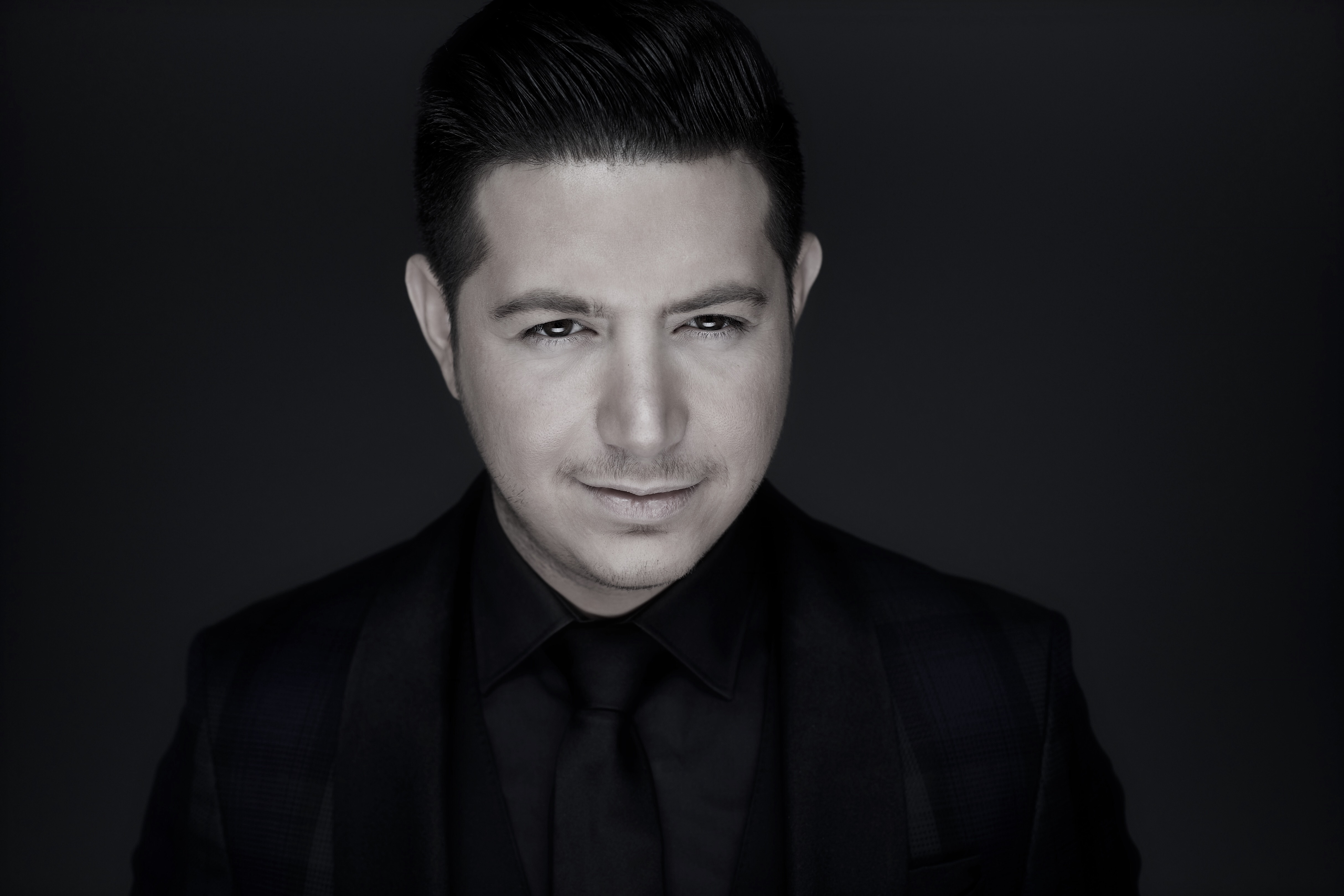
- Born: March 31, 1990 (age 36); Iraq
- Education: Oxford Schools; University of La Verne
- Occupations: Producer, writer, television host
- Years active: 2007–present

Raffi Boghosian (born March 31, 1990) is an Iraqi-Armenian television host, producer, writer, and media executive. He is the President of the Golden Globes Foundation and the founder of Bogo Studios LLC, a Los Angeles-based media production company.

== Early life and family ==
He was born in mousel-iraq to a large, well-known Armenian business family. He and his family moved from iraq to Syria when he was a young child, and the family later moved to Amman, Jordan. Later, Boghosian moved to Los Angeles. His passion for entertainment news began at the early age of 16 while attending Oxford Schools. Shortly into his career, he was voted Most Popular Youth Presenter in the Middle East in 2009. Boghosian earned his Bachelor of Arts in Business Administration, from the University of La Verne.

== Career ==
Boghosian began his career in 2011 as a News Correspondent for Middle East Broadcasting Center, a Dubai-based satellite television network. Here, his stories and interviews were seen by an enormous Arabic-speaking audience. He worked for that network until 2015, when he began conducting interviews with Al Arabiya, an MBC sister company.

Currently, aside from producing shows for the Middle Eastern market, Boghosian is a Hollywood news correspondent for the Middle East Network/Al-Arabiya. His stories and interviews reach a large, worldwide Arabic-speaking audience. In this role, he primarily covers entertainment and celebrity news. During this career, he has the opportunity to interview stars as diverse as Cristiano Ronaldo, David Beckham, Arnold Schwarzenegger, Emma Stone, Al Pacino, Jean Claude van Damme, Steven Spielberg, James Franco, Gerrard Butler, and Larry King, among others.

== Memberships ==
Outside of film and entertainment, Boghosian has been a member of the U.S. Department of State – Foreign Affairs Centers since 2014. He was also awarded the U.S. Senate and House of Representatives press badges. In addition, he is a member of the Los Angeles Press Club and the Motion Picture Association of America.
