= Oxford Schools =

- Amman; Jordan

Information
- Type: Private
- Religious affiliation: Islam
- Established: 1996
- Enrollment: 3000+
- Average class size: 75 sq.m. – 100 sq.m
- Student to teacher ratio: 10:1
- Colors: Teal and white
- Website: Oxford Schools

Oxford Schools (Arabic: مدارس اكسفورد) is an International English and National Arabic medium co-education private school founded in 1996. The school is situated in Amman, Jordan. It offers both British and American curriculum programs for its students.

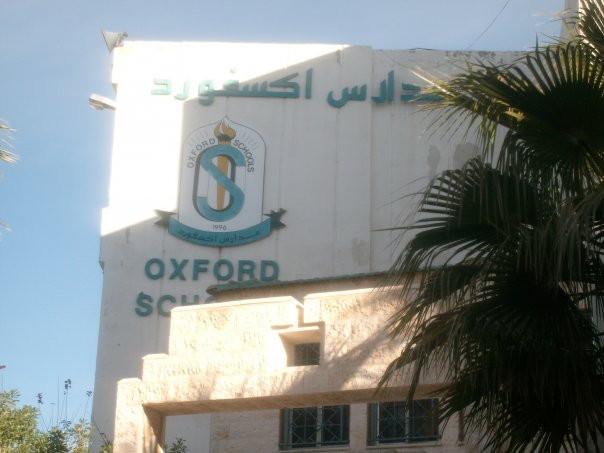
The Oxford Schools main entrance in Amman, Jordan
