= Baires Raffaelli =

Italian architect and author

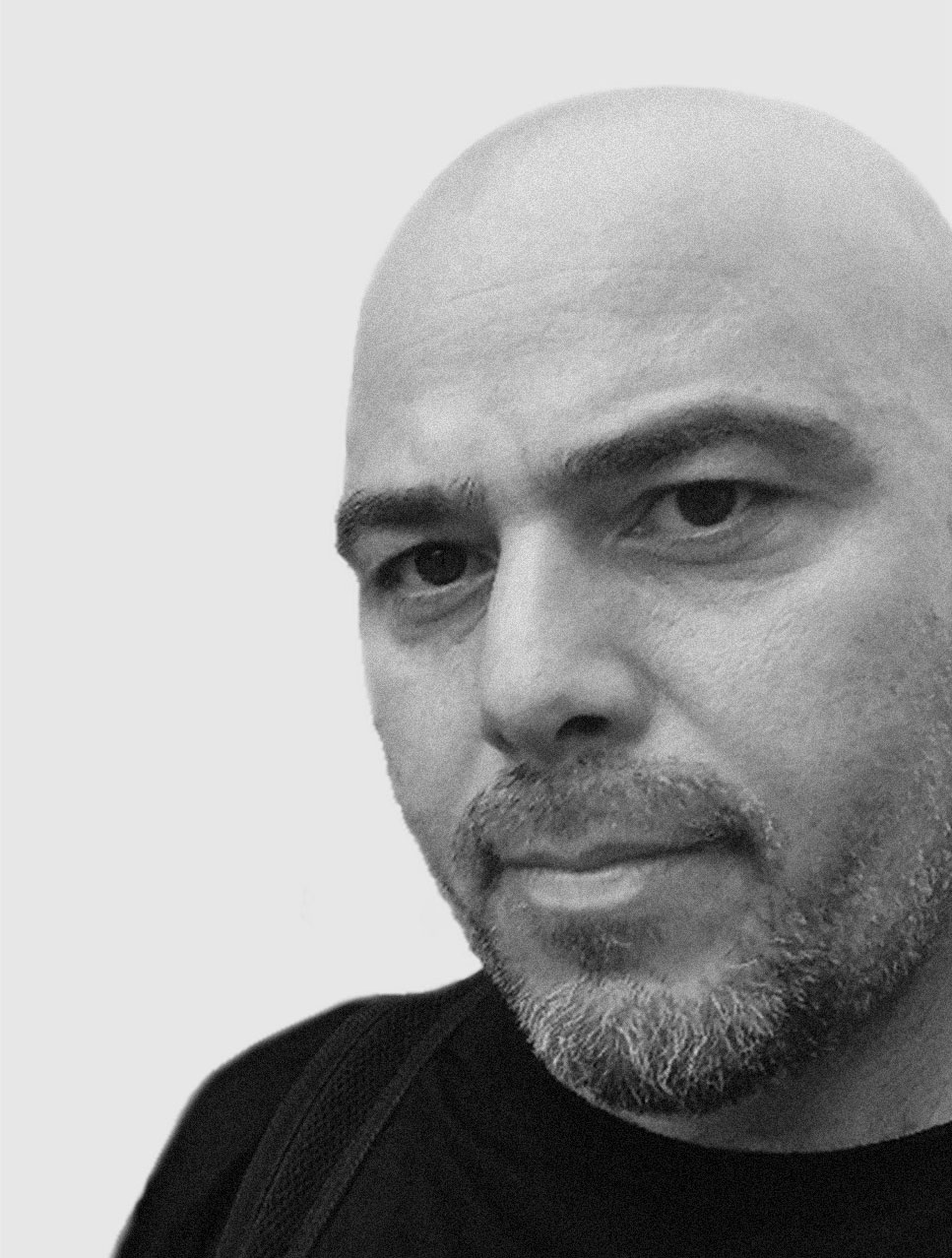
A close up picture of Baires Raffaelli

Baires Raffaelli (born 1975) is an Italian architect and author. He obtained his PhD from the Sapienza University of Rome with a focus on Architecture, Theory, and Planning. His professional interests include innovative architectural design, formal typology, and the integration of accessibility in architectural practices.

In the field of accessibility, he developed an application, AVLA, in collaboration with the Department of Civil Construction, and Environmental Engineering, Sapienza University of Rome, for assessing the accessibility level of spaces and buildings. This tool is used for drafting urban plans aimed at eliminating architectural barriers, with the goal of evaluating and proposing solutions that overcome these barriers both technically and semantically.

Raffaelli's contributions to formal typology analyses the relationship between the perception of geometric form and strategies originating from coded visual rhetoric. He delineated shaping techniques, highlighting the importance to handle them with caution due to their propensity to distort spatial perception.

His book The Fast Guide to Architectural Form (2016) gives examples of sixty architectural forms. Through these examples, it demonstrates how a non-coherent or incorrect formal choice impacts the effectiveness of the work's didactic and communicative aspects. The introduction was written by Luigi Prestinenza Puglisi. It has been translated into Chinese, Persian. This book serves as a reference in architecture classes, and has been cited in academic settings such as the 3rd Panhellenic Conference on Education in the 21st Century (Athens, 2018), where it was used to explore the relationship between form, perception, and creative education. A theoretical reference to the book also appears in Initiations (2021), within a discussion on the role of leading ideas in architectural design. The book received an honourable mention in association with the Bruno Zevi Award.

His second book, The Fast Guide to Accessibility Design (2020) serves as an institutional reference text, specifically for studies on how architecture can enhance the spatial experience for those living with the absence of a sense, promoting both accessibility and architectural coherence.

== Publications ==
- — (2016). The Fast Guide to Architectural Form. BIS Publishers. ISBN 978-9063694111.
- — (2020). The Fast Guide to Accessibility Design. BIS Publishers. ISBN 978-9063695712.
- — (2023). The Fast Guide to the Fundamentals of Architectural Design: Strategies and Techniques for Creating a Successful Project. BIS Publishers. ISBN 9789063696856.
