= Raffaella De Vita =

Italian and American biomechanical engineer

Raffaella De Vita is an Italian and American biomechanical engineer whose research studies the mechanical properties of soft tissue, including ligaments, the female reproductive system, the pelvic floor, and in gender-affirming surgery. She is a professor and associate department head of research in the Department of Mechanical Engineering at Virginia Tech.

== Education and career ==
De Vita is the daughter of a worker at Italian tech firm Olivetti. She received a laurea in mathematics from the University of Naples Federico II in 2000. She went to the University of Pittsburgh for graduate study in mechanical engineering, received a master's degree in 2003, and completed her Ph.D. in 2005.

She joined Virginia Tech as a visiting assistant professor in 2006, and became an assistant professor in the Department of Biomedical Engineering and Mechanics in 2007. Her professional interest in the biomechanics of the female reproductive system began a few years later, when she was pregnant with her first child. She was promoted to associate professor in 2013 and full professor in 2017. In 2024 she moved to the Department of Mechanical Engineering.

== Recognition ==
De Vita received a National Science Foundation CAREER Award in 2012 and a Presidential Early Career Award for Scientists and Engineers in 2014, given "for outstanding research in F pelvic floor disorders (PFDs) by providing engineering based knowledge on the structural and mechanical properties of associated supporting tissues".

In 2019 the American Society of Mechanical Engineers (ASME) named her as an ASME Fellow. The American Institute for Medical and Biological Engineering elected her to its College of Fellows in 2021, "for outstanding contributions to the field of soft tissue mechanics through research, education, and service".
