= Depression and Anxiety =

- Discipline: Psychiatry, psychology
- Language: English
- Edited by: Raffaella Bosurgi

Publication details
- History: 1993–present
- Publisher: Wiley-Blackwell
- Frequency: Monthly
- Open access: Yes (as of January 1, 2023)
- Impact factor: 4.7 (2023)

Standard abbreviations
- ISO 4: Depress. Anxiety

Indexing
- CODEN: DEANF5
- ISSN: 1520-6394 (print); 1520-6394 (web)
- LCCN: 97643381
- OCLC no.: 858833641

Links
- Journal homepage; Online access; Online archive

Depression and Anxiety is a monthly peer-reviewed medical journal published by Wiley-Blackwell. It is an official journal of the Anxiety and Depression Association of America and covers research on depressive and anxiety disorders. The journal was established in 1993 as two separate journals: Depression (ISSN 1062-6417) and Anxiety (ISSN 1070-9797), which were merged in 1996 under the current title.

== Abstracting and indexing ==
The journal is abstracted and indexed in:

- Academic Search
- Chemical Abstracts Service
- Current Contents/Clinical Medicine
- Current Contents/Social & Behavioral Sciences
- Embase/EMCare
- Index Medicus/MEDLINE/PubMed
- PsycINFO/Psychological Abstracts
- Science Citation Index
- Scopus
- Social Sciences Citation Index
- VINITI Database RAS

According to the Journal Citation Reports, the journal has a 2015 impact factor of 5.004.
