= Rafael =

Rafael may refer to:

- List of storms named Rafael
- Rafael Advanced Defense Systems, Israeli manufacturer of weapons and military technology
- Rafael (given name), a list of people and fictional characters
- Rafael (TV series), a Mexican telenovela
- Rafaël (film), a 2018 Dutch film
- Rafael, California, United States, a former unincorporated community

== See also ==
- Raphael (disambiguation)
- Dassault Rafale
- San Rafael (disambiguation)
- Raffaele
