= Anat Rafaeli =

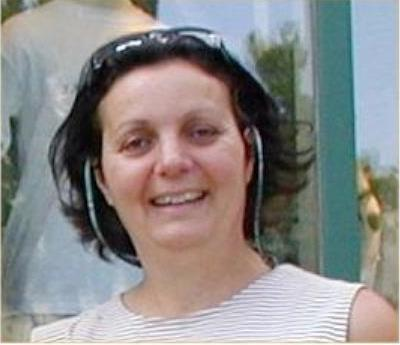
Anat Rafaeli

Anat Rafaeli (Hebrew: ענת רפאלי) is an Israeli researcher, scholar of Organisational Behavior, a Professor Emerita at the Technion and the Yigal Alon Chair of Industrial Engineering and Mmanagement. She served as the Deputy Senior Vice President of International Academic Relations of the Technion and was the Executive Director of Technion International . Rafaeli is a fellow of the Association for Psychological Science, a member of the Academy of Management, with extensive experience as an author and a former member of the editorial boards of The Academy of Management Journal, The Academy of Management Review, Administrative Science Quarterly and Journal of Applied Psychology.

== Biography ==
Rafaeli completed her undergraduate studies in Psychology and Mathematics at the University of Haifa in Israel. She completed her graduate (MA and PhD) studies at the Ohio State University in 1985 in Organisational Psychology and post-doctorate research at the Faculty of Industrial Engineering and Management at Stanford University in California.

== Academic career ==
Prior to her career at Technion, Israel Institute of Technology Rafaeli was a member of the faculty at the school of business administration of the Hebrew University in Jerusalem and at the Business School of the University of Michigan.

Rafaeli's research spans different aspects of Organisational Behavior and Organizational Theory. Early in her career she conducted and published studies that invalidated the notion of the utility of graphology or handwriting analysis for personnel selection. In a separate line of work she published studies which tested and disproved the economic viability of employment advertising. Her research showed that the use of employment advertising is not economically viable especially in comparison to employee referrals. On top of these Rafaeli worked in the field of quality circles and their positive impact on employees' emotions.

Rafaeli's major contribution is in defining the presentation of emotion as part of employment roles in the context of emotional labor as a factor in organizational processes. Working together with Robert I. Sutton, Rafaeli identified mechanisms of recruitment, instruction and rewards to employees which exert emotions that are required as part of their jobs. She has researched the importance of the dress code in the workplace in general and in the service industry in particular. This research was conducted as part of a larger work on symbols and artifacts in the workplace. Rafaeli's research papers have also touched on the world of customer service. She studied the psychology of queues and queue management and the impact of anger of customers towards employees. Rafaeli researched customer service through technology media channels, such as online chat in collaborations with IBM and LivePerson. for which she received an IBM research award.

== Public activism ==
Rafaeli is a member of the Academic Boards of Israel's Open University and the Ort Braude Academic College of Engineering Rafaeli was on the executive board of WomensOwn, an organization for the economic empowerment of women in Israel. Together with her brother she established the Avital foundation which helps support the education of young women who had been deprived of education because they were brought up in ultra-orthodox families. She was on the board of Hillel, an Israeli-nonprofit dedicated to helping young adults who have left the ultra-orthodox world lead successful lives as members of Israeli society, and also on the board of Haifa's Battered Women’s Shelters. She is currently on the board of Haifa's Rape Crisis Center, which is a part of

== Published works ==
- Expression of emotion as part of the work role - link
- When cashiers meet customers: An analysis of the role of supermarket cashiers - link
- Emotion as a connection of physical artifacts and organizations - link
- "Artifacts and Organizations", a book Rafaeli wrote together with Michael. G. Pratt - link

Rafaeli's work has been published in scientific journals such as The Academy of Management Journal, Academy of Management Review and the Journal of Applied Psychology. Rafaeli's work has also been referenced in mass media publications such as Forbes, Huffington Post UK and Newsweek.

== See also ==
- Women of Israel
