= Raphael (disambiguation) =

Raphael was an Italian Renaissance painter.

Raphael or Raphaël may also refer to:

== Music ==
- Raphael (band), a Japanese rock band active 1997–2001
- Raphael (opera), an 1894 opera by Anton Arensky
- Raphael (musician), American musician and composer of ambient music
- Raphael (singer), Spanish singer
- Raphaël Haroche, French singer known by the mononym Raphaël
- The Raphaels, an alternative country music band

== People, fictional characters and archangels ==
- Raphael (given name), a name of Hebrew origin, including a list of people, fictional characters and the archangel
- Raphael (surname), a list of people
- Raphael (archangel), an archangel in Judaism, Christianity, and Islam
- Raphael I of Constantinople, Ecumenical Patriarch of Constantinople from 1475 to 1476
- Raphael II of Constantinople, Ecumenical Patriarch of Constantinople from 1603 to 1607
- Raphael of Brooklyn (1860–1915), saint in the Eastern Orthodox Church
- Raphael of Lesvos, saint in the Eastern Orthodox Church
- Raphael I Bidawid, patriarch of the Chaldean Catholic Church in 1989–2003
- Raphael (Teenage Mutant Ninja Turtles), a fictional character
- Raphael, a fictional villain in the video game Baldur's Gate 3

== Other uses ==
- Raphael (crater), a crater on Mercury
- Raphaël (JavaScript library), cross-browser JavaScript library that draws Vector graphics for web sites
- AMD Raphael, codename for AMD Ryzen 7000 series desktop CPUs
- Raphael, or The Debauched One, a 1971 French drama film
- Raphaels Bank, a UK-based bank
- Raphael, codename of the HTC Touch Pro

== See also ==
- Acronicta raphael, a moth of the family Noctuidae
- Rafael (disambiguation)
- Raffle
- Raphael Cartoons, seven large cartoons for tapestries, belonging to the British Royal Collection
- Raphael catfish (disambiguation)
- Raphael House, the first shelter for homeless families in San Francisco, California, founded in 1971
- Raphael Rooms, four reception rooms, the public part of the papal apartments in the Palace of the Vatican
- Saint Raphael (disambiguation)
- Saint-Raphaël (disambiguation)
