= San Rafael, Sinaloa =

Coordinates: 25.8372°N 108.6375°W

San Rafael is a small town located about 15 minutes southeast of Guasave, Sinaloa, Mexico. The small town was flooded (around the year 1987 according to a local) because of a broken dike. The government helped the city rebuild.
