= Raphael, Nicholas, and Irene of Lesbos =

Greek saints

Saints Raphael, Nicholas, and Irene

New Martyrs
- Venerated in: Eastern Orthodox Church
- Canonized: 1970, Istanbul by Ecumenical Patriarchate
- Major shrine: Holy monastery of Saints Raphael Nicholas and Irene, Lesbos
- Feast: Bright Tuesday

Raphael, Nicholas, and Irene of Lesbos (Greek: Ραφαήλ, Νικόλαος και Ειρήνη) are venerated as saints and neomartyrs in the Eastern Orthodox Church. According to a 20th-century legend, they lived on the island of Lesbos in the 15th century and were killed by Turkish raiders in April 1463. Raphael is said to have been the abbot of a monastery of Karyes, near the village of Thermi, Nicholas a deacon in the same monastery, and Irene the 12-year-old daughter of the local mayor.

The story of the three saints first emerged in 1959, when local villagers reported seeing them in their dreams and in miraculous visions, during which the saints revealed their stories to them. The supposed site of their martyrdom was subsequently excavated and human remains believed to be those of the saints were found. These relics are today kept in a monastery that was re-built on the site. It is situated at the northeastern part of the island, at a distance of 12 km from Mytilene and 3 km of Thermi, on a hill called Karyes. The saints were canonized in 1970. The monastery has become a prominent center of pilgrimage.
