= Raffaello (disambiguation) =

Raffaello is a masculine given name. It may also refer to:

- SS Raffaello, an Italian ocean liner
- Raffaello (confection), an Italian truffle confection
- Raffaello MPLM, one of the three Multi-Purpose Logistics Modules used to transfer supplies to the International Space Station
