= W leju po bombie =

1993 short story by Andrzej Sapkowski

- Short story by Andrzej Sapkowski
- Country: Poland
- Language: Polish
- Genre: Science fiction

Publication
- Published in: Fenix
- Publication date: 1993
- Award: Janusz A. Zajdel Award

"W leju po bombie" (transl. In the Bomb Crater) is a 1993 science fiction short story by Andrzej Sapkowski. It belongs to the genres of military and political fiction, as well as klerykal fiction and politpunk.

Set in an alternate-reality Poland ruled by a powerful religious Curia, the story depicts a chaotic and war-torn world where foreign (Lithuanian and German) paramilitary forces clash on Polish soil, while nationalist gangs, and geopolitical conflicts shape everyday life. The narrative follows a group of schoolchildren navigating the dangers of their conflict-torn city, spending much time in the titular bomb crater, which becomes a microcosm of the broader political and social turmoil.

Originally written for a planned but never-published anti-clerical anthology, the story was first published in 1993 in the magazine Fenix and has since been reprinted in multiple anthologies and literary collections, as well as translated into Czech and Serbian. In 1994, the story won the Janusz A. Zajdel Award. Critics praised "W leju po bombie" for its sharp social commentary (namely sharp critique of nationalism, xenophobia, and religious authoritarianism), ironic humor, and unique blend of science fiction and political allegory, seeing it as a product of post-communist Poland's anxieties.

== History ==
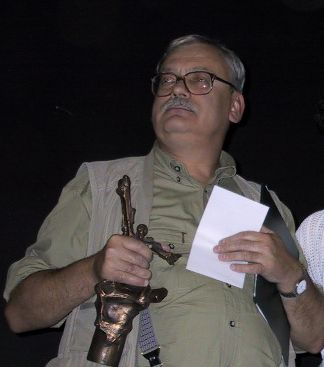
Andrzej Sapkowski, with the Janusz A. Zajdel Award at the Polcon 2003

The short story was originally written for a never-published "anti-klerykal" anthology with an unspecified title, proposed in 1992. It was first published in the Fenix magazine in 1993 and, in the same year, a shortened version appeared in Magazyn Wileński. In 1997, it was reprinted in the zine Czerwony Karzeł by the Gdańsk Science Fiction Club and in the zine Fahrenheit. A year later, it was published in the Białystok magazine Kartki. From at least 2002, (Note: Based on information from the Internet Archive for domain sapkowski.pl.) the story has been available on Andrzej Sapkowski's official website (Sapkowski Zone).

The story has also been included in several short story collections. In 2000, it appeared in Coś się kończy, coś się zaczyna (Something Ends, Something Begins) and in 2012 in Maladie i inne opowiadania (Maladies and Other Stories).

In 1994, the story was published in the Czech Republic in the anthology Tandaradei!. In 2016, a Serbian translation (U krateru od bombe) was released as part of the collection Maladie... (Maladi i druge priče).

In 2023, the short story was made available for free to users of the Nowa Fantastyka app as part of a campaign supporting the Polish Humanitarian Action's efforts to aid Ukraine, which was under attack from Russia.

== Plot ==
The story takes place in the titular bomb crater, located in Suwałki, within an alternate reality where the residents, after the Chernobyl disaster, have become radioactive mutants. Poland is ruled by the Curia, foreigner-attacking skinhead gangs roam the streets, parts of the country have been annexed by Germany, and the Suwałki Region itself is the site of clashes between Lithuanian paramilitary units ("Šauliai") and German and American forces, while Polish troops are involved in pacifying Iraq and the Czech Republic. The protagonists of the story are children on their way to school.

The day begins inauspiciously when the protagonist and narrator of the story smashes a glass with his father's dentures in it and then tries to retrieve it from the drain. The protagonist describes his daily life in Suwałki, where his father is unemployed after being fired for disrespecting religious symbols. The boy's mother works in a German factory (Prussia has once again become part of Germany). Leaving the house, the narrator notices that the city is in chaos due to the ongoing fighting. The narrator tries to stay calm by turning on music on his Walkman and continuing his way to school. Walking through the streets, the protagonist becomes a witness to armed clashes. Mi-28 helicopters appear in the air and tracer bullets cross the sky. The boy wonders who could be involved in the conflict - Lithuanians, Germans, Americans or maybe local criminal gangs. On the way, he meets a group of skinheads lynching a Russian-speaking trader, and then falls into the titular bomb crater, where he meets a classmate. Soon the boys realize that the fighting is between Lithuanian and German paramilitary units; in the meantime they save a classmate who managed to survive an attempted rape and a nearby shell explosion, they witness the death of a German and a Lithuanian who fall into their crater, seriously wounded, and finally they listen to a speech by politician Marcin Kenig on the radio, which is interrupted by his murder. In the evening, the fighting ends, and the teenage heroes return to the city center.

== Analysis ==
Maciej Parowski described the story as "military and political fiction of a near-future setting... one of many instances of Sapkowski stepping outside the fantasy genre". Przemysław Czapliński, Piotr Śliwiński and Marek Szyjewski categorized it as political fiction; with the later also referring to it as social fiction. Rafał Ziemkiewicz, in the foreword to the story in Fenix, categorized it as politpunk (a genre referencing contemporary history and depicting Polish realities in a "punk" manner), and the author of the anonymous foreword in Magazyn Wileński did the same. However, Adam Mazurkiewicz considered this classification unnecessary, calling it "terminological overproduction within the internal criticism emerging for and within the fandom"; he emphasized that Sapkowski used simple science fiction convention to enhance the adventure-like character of the story. Sapkowski himself noted that the story is "the only one of my works that can be said with certainty not to be fantasy. Thanks to 'W leju po bombie', I can therefore proudly call myself a 'science fiction author'".

Jan Ratuszniak described the story's theme as a warning against the rise of nationalism in Poland and globally, as well as the lack of civic engagement. Tomasz Pacyński similarly noted that "the text reflects the author's attitude towards xenophobia, human smallness, and stupidity", calling it "a morality play about individual freedom [and] about decency in vile times".

The story also includes anti-clerical motifs (it was written for a never-realized anti-clerical anthology); with several critics observing that some religious secondary characters, such as the protagonist's father and a priest, are portrayed negatively. Marek Oramus identified among these motifs a vision of Poland oppressed by the church, the omnipotence of the clergy (the Curia can do anything, and it ideologically pacifies the country), and warning of "the danger of yielding to the church... how excessive clerical intervention negatively affects individual freedom and citizens' private lives". For these reasons the story has been classified as belong to the klerykal fiction genre.

The character of the Lithuanian general Želigauskas, who invades Poland, is an ironic reference to the Polish general Lucjan Żeligowski. Another historical reference is the street named after Eligiusz Niewiadomski, the assassin of President Gabriel Narutowicz.

== Reception ==
In 1994, the story was awarded the Janusz A. Zajdel Award.

Maciej Parowski praised the story as "excellent" and "delicious". In 2001, Mariusz Cieślik, reviewing the collection of Sapkowski's stories, considered this one of the weaker texts, writing: "To my taste, there are too many not very funny jokes in this text". Tomasz Pacyński had the opposite opinion, writing the same year about the same collection: "The true gem, for which it is worth buying the collection, is the story 'W leju po bombie'", evaluating the work as still relevant. However, in 2009, Artur Chruściel disagreed, writing that the story "was born from fears and diagnoses that have long been – respectively – dead and outdated", while praising it from other perspectives ("brilliantly written... excellent effect of combining irony, humor, and serious themes"). Similarly, in 1995, Marek Oramus considered the anti-clerical theme of the early 90s as "falsified and cast into oblivion by reality", but also praised the story, noting that it would be remembered "not for its intellectual qualities", but because "such language, such concentration of gags, such a load of grotesque... had not been seen before in [Polish] SF". Oramus revisited the story in 2019, writing that "the narrative sparkles with witty details and paradoxes, but the reading provokes considerable melancholy: again war, albeit local, but with no coherence, as is the case on Polish soil. Sapkowski occasionally uses broad strokes, depicting the paranoid existence of the local population, hiding from bullets and struggling with their national identity".

According to Oramus, Sapkowski's story inspired Piotr Gociek's story "Jak utopiliśmy Hana Solo" (lit. How We Drowned Han Solo) from the anthology Przedmurze (2016), as that story takes place in the same region, time, and has many similar themes.

In 1998, Marek Szyjewski dedicated a short essay titled "Bomba fantazji" (lit. The Bomb of Fantasy) to this story in the magazine Kartki. He reviewed it positively, noting that it has a "special charm" and contains "a bit of... magic".
