= Klerykal fiction =

Subgenre of Polish science fiction

Klerykal fiction (rarely, klerykal fantasy and science fiction, anti-klerykal fantasy and science fiction, (Note: Fantastyka klerykalna, fantastyka antyklerykalna. Note that Polish term "fantastyka", sometimes translated to English as fantastika, encompasses both fantasy and science fiction, and arguably other speculative fiction genres.) also translated to English as clerical fiction (Note: In English, however, clerical fiction can also refer to broader concept of fiction about priests (clergy).)) is a term for a subgenre of Polish speculative fiction and broader religious fiction that addresses Christian themes. The term was coined in the early 1990s. According to some scholars (Adam Mazurkiewicz, Marek Oramus), this genre is usually critical of religion (especially organized church structures), while others (Natalia Budzyńska) interpret it more broadly, applying the term to stories that are neutral or even positively disposed towards religion within.

Formative works contributing to the emergence of the genre include Jacek Dukaj's short story The Golden Galley (1990) and Rafał Ziemkiewicz's Jawnogrzesznica (The Public Sinner, 1991). One of the most prominent representatives of the genre is Marek Huberath.

== History ==
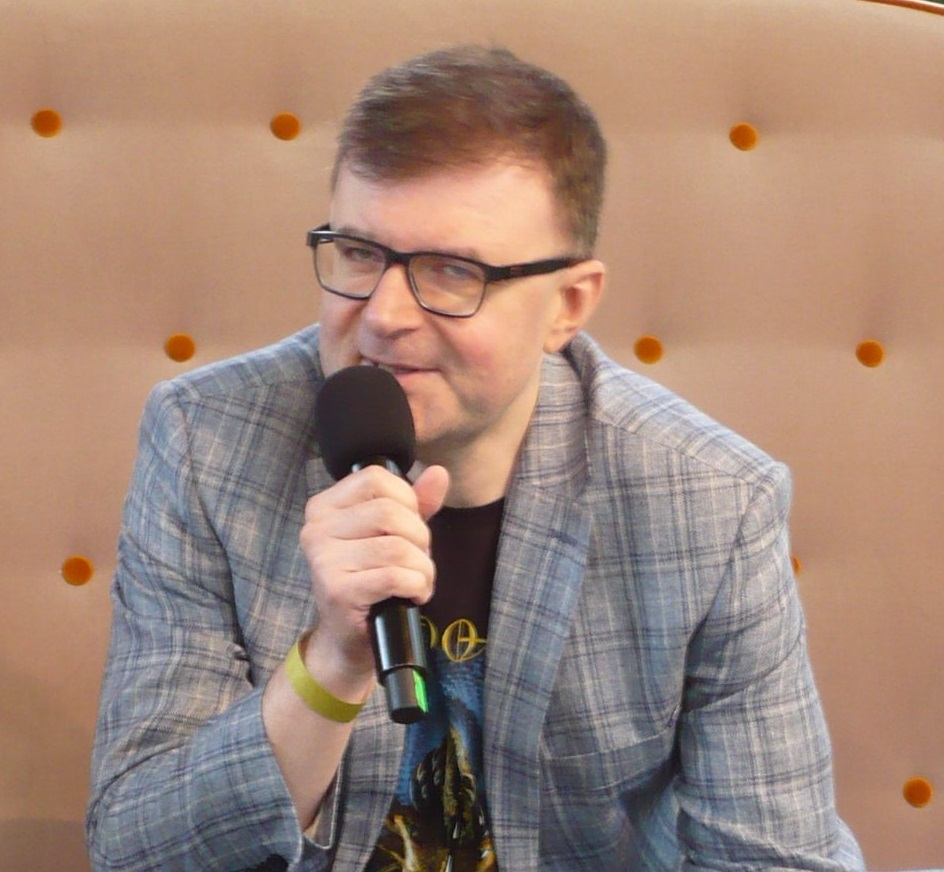
Jacek Dukaj, whose short story "The Golden Galley" is considered formative for the genre

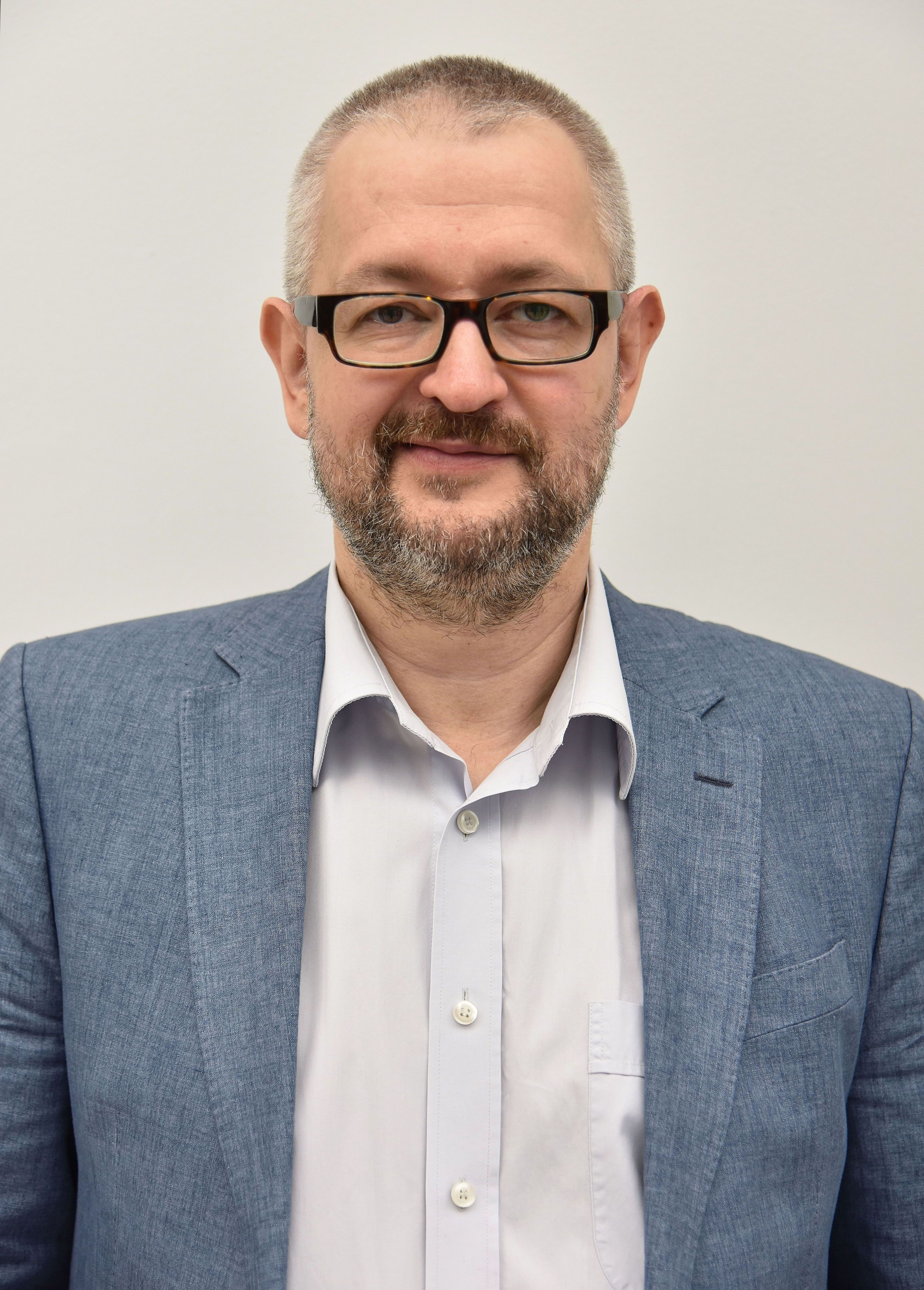
Rafał Ziemkiewicz, whose short story "The Public Sinner" is considered formative for the genre

This genre emerged in Poland at the turn of the 1980s and 1990s and is a subgenre of broader religious fiction as well as social science fiction. The genre is sometimes called historical; its period of popularity is attributed to the first half of the 1990s. In Poland, this period was characterized by, among other things, a decline in public trust in the Catholic Church, combined with the church's entry into politics, which led to the emergence of anti-church movements. In 1992, Wojtek Sedeńko, in the introduction to the religious fantasy and science fiction anthology Czarna msza (Black Mass), wrote that "the fear of clericalization of the state is quite common (certainly influenced by the church's recent spectacular successes, such as the return of religion to schools, the recovery of vast property in real estate, becoming an opinion-forming factor in many areas of life)". After the post-communist factions briefly returned to power in Poland in the mid-1990s (the Democratic Left Alliance's victory in the 1993 elections), there was a certain restoration of trust in the church and a simultaneous decline in the popularity of literature critical of it, including klerykal fiction.

Formative or fundamental works contributing to the emergence of the genre include Jacek Dukaj's short story The Golden Galley (1990) and Rafał Ziemkiewicz's Jawnogrzesznica (The Public Sinner, 1991). Tomasz Kołodziejczak, credited with coining the term, described these works as "a reaction to the social fears of the end of the decade". Western novels like Walter M. Miller's A Canticle for Leibowitz (1959) and Michael Moorcock's Behold the Man (1969) became widely available in Poland in the 1990s. These books may have played a role in shaping the klerykal fiction genre as they were viewed as critical of traditional religious models.

== Characteristics ==
Klerykal fiction texts are often described as critical of religion. In 1994, Tadeusz Olszański proposed dividing religious fiction into devout, theistic, and klerykal fiction, with the latter characterized by an "anti-church" approach (though not necessarily without a theistic perspective). In 1995, Marek Oramus criticized this subgenre, which he defined as "describing the dangers of yielding to the church, lamenting under church rule, the torment of going to confession, and the adverse effects of priestly interventions on individual freedom and private life". He considered it "the most primitive first-level fantasy and science fiction, falsified and rendered non-existent by reality". In 2002, Jacek Dukaj characterized klerykal fiction as the weakest and most ephemeral trend in Polish fantasy and science fiction, describing the term "fantastyka klerykalna" ("klerykal speculative fiction") as pejorative and attributing it to a narrow class of works that were literary echoes of the anti-church sentiments and movements of the early 1990s. Olszański considered church criticism as part of the Protestant (anti-Catholic) tradition in English-language literature.

By 2006, Adam Mazurkiewicz believed that klerykal fiction might be unnecessary, as it had not yet been accepted by genre criticism. In 2014 his position changed with a deeper analysis, describing the genre as "a phenomenon at the intersection of literature and socio-political journalism... marked by ironic distance, reflecting the specificity of the phenomenon by referring to the petrified vision of a hero associated with church structures". Mazurkiewicz referred to works in this subgenre as scandalous and aggressive, comparing them to pasquinades ridiculing their enemies. In 2022, Stanisław Krawczyk described the genre as "a critique of formalized, ossified religiosity, especially institutions similar to or directly identified with the Roman Catholic Church".

A common element of klerykal fiction is criticism of the church's excessive presence in (Polish) society. The church is often identified as a totalitarian institution and becomes a collective negative protagonist. Such works often have a satirical or grotesque character. In some works of this genre, the stereotype of a theocratic, totalitarian Poland emerged.

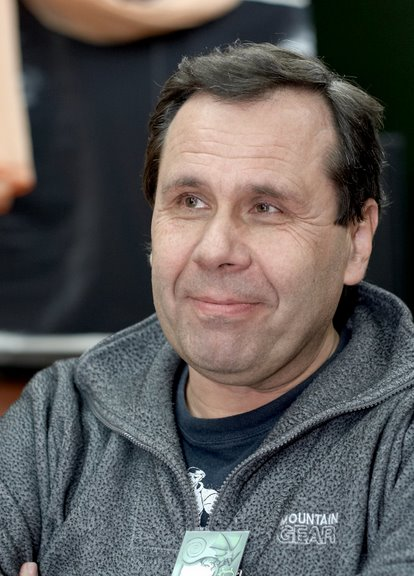
Marek Huberath, considered one of the most prominent representatives of this genre

Mazurkiewicz noted that many klerykal fiction works can be associated with liberal-left-wing views or milieus and represent an artistic response or reaction to works from neoconservative-right-wing environments. Such views include a "fascination with the connections between fascism and religion", modeled on interwar movements (mentioning authors such as Rafał Ziemkiewicz, Cezary Michalski, Wacław Holewiński, and Bronisław Wildstein).

Natalia Budzyńska (1999, 2002, 2009) takes a different approach, defining klerykal fiction as Polish fantasy and science fiction literature which addresses Christian themes. Under this definition, these works include texts that are positively disposed towards religion, "siding with Christianity, showing authentic faith, or permeated with evangelical content, including pro-life themes". In contrast, Mazurkiewicz sees such works (analyzing Polish religiosity in the context of fantasy and science fiction, where "the ideological stance of their authors is not polemically charged") on the fringes of this trend. Using a simpler definition, Tadeusz Żabski identified klerykal fiction as Polish fantasy and science fiction literature which addresses faith issues. Similarly, Ewa Kozak cites Marcin Zwierzchowski's definition of the subgenre as "stories referring to matters of faith or the church".

According to Piotr Konieczny, the phenomenon of linguistic reclamation occurs here, i.e. the adoption of a previously pejorative term by the criticized group and its use in a positive way, i.e. the extension of the term clerical fiction from works unequivocally critical of the Church, or even religion, to all works of broadly understood religious speculative ficiton, containing any form of criticism of sacrum phenomena (e.g. being a warning to the faithful and the Church against losing faith). Konieczny suggested here the need to create and use new terms to clearly distinguish anti-religious works ("anti-klerykal fiction") from pro-religious works ("Christian warning fiction" or "pro-klerykal fiction").

One example of the difficulty of classifying the genre can be found in Ziemkiewicz's works. They are classified as klerykal fiction, but simultaneously described as "fervently religious in the best sense and thoroughly permeated with evangelical content". They fall under the classification of klerykal fiction because of their criticism of church institutions, but the church criticized by Ziemkiewicz is not the current church, but a fictional one, with his works acting as a cautionary tale against its degeneration into a church of pharisaism (hypocrisy). Ziemkiewicz describes a "permissivist post-church that [...] has lost faith in its Founder, agreed to the relativity of Christ's Truth, and ceased to proclaim the Good News and is no longer needed by anyone".

Marek Huberath is considered by Mazurkiewicz and Wojciech Orliński as one of the most prominent representatives of the genre.

== Selected works ==
The classification of specific works into this subgenre is sometimes subjective. Among the pioneering works in the genre of Polish science fiction which addresses metaphysical and religious themes one can include, for instance, the novel Wyczerpać morze (Exhaust the Sea) by Jan Dobraczyński from 1961, the novel His Master's Voice by Stanisław Lem from 1968, the short story Relacja z pierwszej ręki (First-Hand Report, 1982) by Janusz Zajdel, the short story Karlgoro, godzina 18.00 (Karlgoro, 6 PM, 1983) by Marek Baraniecki, the novel Adam, jeden z nas (Adam, One of Us, 1986) by Konrad Fiałkowski, and the short story Jeruzalem (Jerusalem, 1988) by Janusz Cyran.

In 2002, Jacek Dukaj estimated this subgenre contains about 40 texts. Works classified as klerykal fiction, in chronological order, include:

- Marcin Wolski, Agent Dołu (Agent from Below, novel, 1988)
- Janusz Cyran, Jeruzalem (Jerusalem, short story, 1988)
- Jacek Dukaj, The Golden Galley (short story, 1990). Other stories by Dukaj also classified in this genre include Książę mroku musi umrzeć (The Prince of Darkness Must Die) and Opętani (Possessed) from 1991, and many in the collection W kraju niewiernych (In the Land of the Faithless, 2000), e.g., In Partibus Infidelium from 2000 and Ziemia Chrystusa (Christ's Earth, 1997).
- Marek Huberath, Kara większa (The Greater Punishment, short story, 1991)
- Rafał Ziemkiewicz, Jawnogrzesznica (The Public Sinner, short story, 1991). According to Budzyńska: Contrary to appearances, this is not an anti-clerical story but a deeply evangelical one.
- Rafał Ziemkiewicz, Szosa na Zaleszczyki (The Road to Zaleszczyki, short story, 1991)
- Tomasz Kołodziejczak, Wstań i idź (Rise and Walk, short story, 1992)
- Stories included in the anthology Czarna msza (Black Mass) edited by Wojtek Sedeńko (1992). Sedeńko noted in the anthology's introduction: I chose [the stories] I considered the best, avoiding the pro or anti criteria like the plague:
  - Grzegorz Drukarczyk, Raj utracony (Paradise Lost)
  - Tadeusz Oszubski, Interregnum
  - Jacek Inglot, Umieraj z nami (Die with Us)
  - Jacek Sobota, Rzeka (The River)
  - Andrzej Drzewiński, Dopust Boży (God's Act)
  - Rafał Ziemkiewicz, Źródło bez wody (The Waterless Spring)
  - Eugeniusz Dębski, ...więc chyba to był On... (...so it probably was Him...)
  - Jacek Dukaj, Korporacja Mesjasz (Messiah Corporation)
  - Mirosław P. Jabłoński, Spotkanie na końcu drogi (Meeting at the End of the Road)
  - Jarosław Grzędowicz, Dom Na Krawędzi Światła (House on the Edge of Light)
  - Jacek Piekara, Dom Na Krawędzi Ciemności (House on the Edge of Darkness)
- Grzegorz Drukarczyk, Zabijcie Odkupiciela (Kill the Redeemer, novel, 1992)
- Olgierd Dudek, Czas siejby (Time of Sowing, short story, 1992)
- Andrzej Sapkowski, W leju po bombie (In the Crater Left by a Bomb, short story, 1993)
- Marek Oramus, Święto śmiechu (The Feast of Laughter, novel, 1995)
- Mirosław P. Jabłoński, Elektryczne banany, czyli ostatni kontrakt Judasza (Electric Bananas, or Judas' Last Contract, novel, 1996)
- Rafał Ziemkiewicz, Tańczący mnich (The Dancing Monk, short story, 1996)
- Jacek Inglot, Quietus (novel, 1997)
- Aleksander Olin, Komusutra (novel, 1997)
- Marek Huberath, Druga podobizna w alabastrze (The Second Likeness in Alabaster, novelette, 1997)
- Marek Huberath, Maika Ivanna (short story, 1997)
- Wojciech Szyda, Psychonautka (Psychonaut, short story, 1997)
- Cykl Inkwizytorski (The Inquisitorial Cycle) by Jacek Piekara, created since 2003
- Marek Huberath, Miasta pod skałą (Cities Under the Rock, novel, 2005)
- Jacek Sobota, Głos Boga (The Voice of God, novel, 2006)
- Jacek Piekara, Przenajświętsza Rzeczpospolita (The Most Holy Republic, novel, 2008)
- Marek Oramus, Kankan na wulkanie (Cancan on a Volcano, novel, 2009)
- Jacek Dukaj, Linia Oporu (Resistance Line, short story, 2010)
- Konrad T. Lewandowski, Anioły muszą odejść (Angels Must Depart, novel, 2011)
- Konrad T. Lewandowski, Czas egzorcystów (Time of the Exorcists, novel, 2014)
- Konrad T. Lewandowski, Utopie (Utopias, 2014)
- Cykl Komornik (the Bailiff Series) by Michał Gołkowski (2016-2023)

Dukaj also classified unspecified short stories by Maciej Żerdziński as klerykal fiction.
