= Jarosław Musiał =

Polish illustrator and comic book artist (1962–2021)

- Born: 1962
- Died: 2021 (aged 58–59)
- Known for: Fantasy art Science fiction art Role-playing games

Jarosław Musiał (1962–2021) was a Polish illustrator and comic book artist.

From the 1980s onwards he cooperated with the Nowa Fantastyka magazine and was the chief artist of Magia i Miecz. He also cooperated with the Fenix magazine. He illustrated fantasy and science fiction books by Feliks W. Kres, Marek S. Huberath, Jacek Piekara, Jacek Komuda, Konrad T. Lewandowski and others, as well as role-playing games such as Kryształy Czasu, Oko Yrrhedesa, Dzikie Pola, Wiedźmin: Gra wyobraźni.
