= CyberJoly Drim =

1999 short story by Antonina Liedtke

- Short story by Antonina Liedtke

Publication
- Publication date: 1998

"CyberJoly Drim" is a cyberpunk short story by Polish author Antonina Liedtke. In the story, the heroine abandons her body in favour of a digital existence. The story was first published on Liedtke's personal website in 1998 before being reprinted by Fenix magazine in 1999.

The story won the most prestigious Polish award for science fiction and fantasy stories (the Janusz A. Zajdel Award), as well as two others, but was negatively reviewed by several writers connected with the leading Polish science fiction and fantasy magazine, Nowa Fantastyka, which had rejected the story before it was submitted to Fenix. Several critics argued that it had no literary merit and criticized those who nominated it for awards or voted for it in them. Other critics praised its depiction of Internet culture, situating its criticism as a reaction to Internet culture by those unfamiliar with it, as well as arguing that some negative reviews were influenced by the reviewers dislike for the story's author, who was an outsider to the closed, male world of Polish SF literary fandom.

== Plot ==
Jola (CyberJoly) is a computer graphic designer working on the Internet who is not enjoying her life; her husband bores her and her physical needs are unimportant. She finds fulfillment in cyberspace, where she once became fascinated by a person with the nickname Carramba. Longing for him, she sent a humorous letter-song to a romantic website, which unexpectedly became a hit on the charts. Then she created an animation that became even more popular. She finally met Carramba and they got married, but her life quickly became mundane again. Disappointed with her life, with the help of friends she had made online, Jola decides to completely cut off herself from the physical world, donating elements of her body to the bank, keeping only her mind, which is connected to the Internet.

== Background and release ==
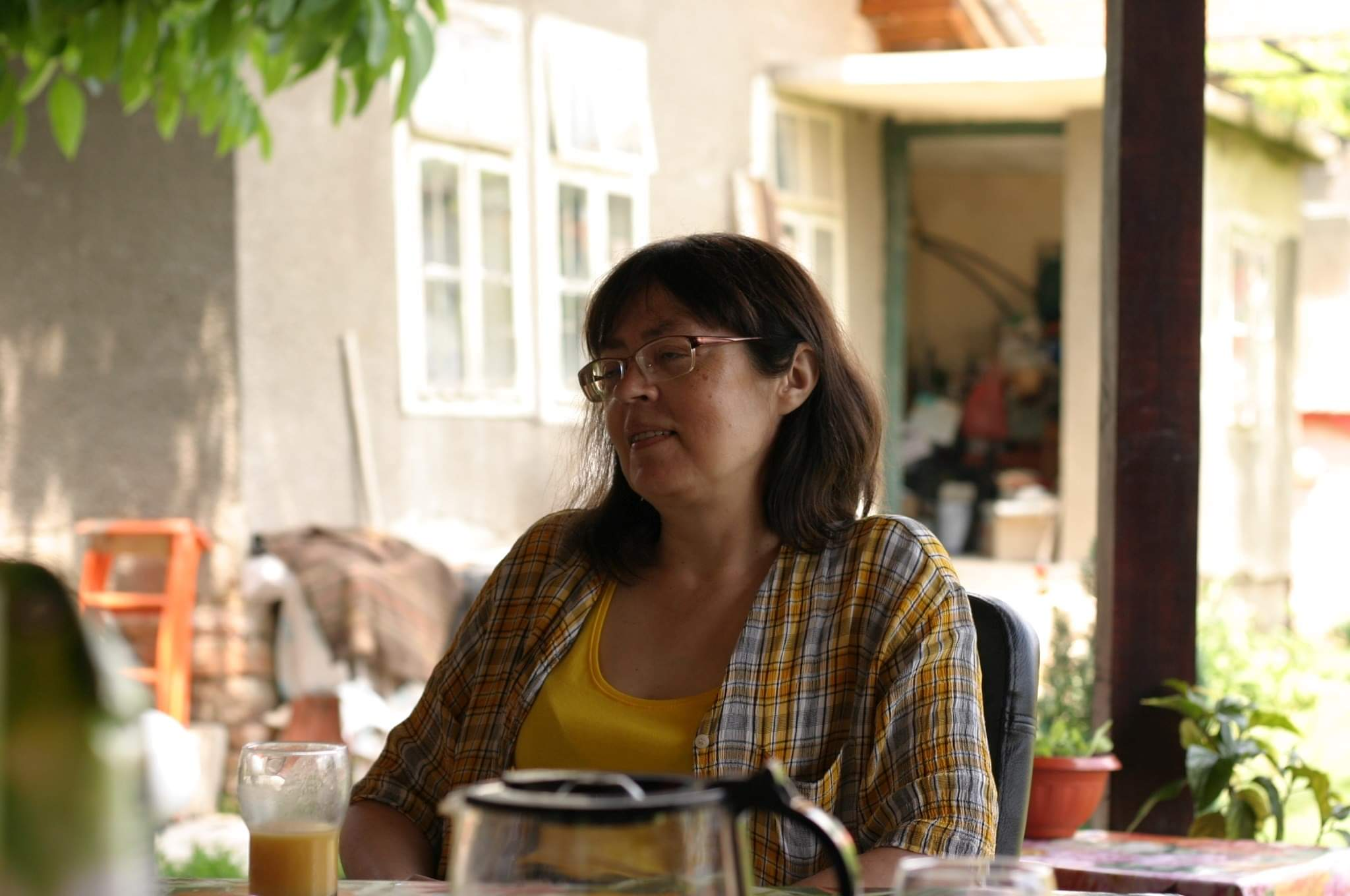
Antonina Liedtke in 2018

Antonina Liedtke is a graduate of librarianship and information science from the University of Warsaw and worked in the library and publishing house of Warsaw University of Technology, and then in the Publishing School of Economics. She published CyberJoly Drim on her own website in 1998 and sent it to Nowa Fantastyka, the leading Polish science fiction and fantasy magazine, where it was rejected by its editor-in-chief Maciej Parowski. It was then sent to Fenix, who published it in 1999.

== Reception ==
=== Awards and controversy ===
It won the Janusz A. Zajdel Award for best short story in 2000. It also won the Srebrny Glob ("Silver Globe") award and the On-line Award by Fahrenheit magazine. (The Zajdel award is the most prestigious Polish award for science fiction and fantasy; the two other awards were more short lived). After the story won prominent literary awards, Nowa Fantastyka published a section, "Critics about CyberJoly Drim", in the January 2001 issue. Three reviews appeared there – by Jacek Dukaj, Marek Oramus and Parowski.

Parowski wrote that "[the text] was captivating in its linguistic and situational consistency in presenting the world of Internet culture". However, he criticized its excessive length, "its mental monomania and action-oriented triviality". He considered the awarding of the Zajdel Prize to the story as the result of "promotion by a certain group" (internet users and young authors), saying that the text met the "mythological and sociological needs of a very large group of internet users".

Dukaj, who himself voted for the story to receive the Silver Globe award, considers it a "good, the best of those printed in 1999, [...] and important" text, if not outstanding. According to the writer, the author successfully combined the thread of a "banal love story" with "internet-related details," creating a realistic story in the cyberpunk genre, which he sees as "a pioneering work in Polish SF." He criticized Parowski for neither understanding nor appreciating the culture of the Internet, and for "failing to see the values in the text that most readers and writers have seen, despite being pointed out to him."

Oramus's response was considered the most critical. Oramus admitted that neither he nor Parowski "feel connected to the Internet subculture from which the story originates". He described the story as banal and devoid of literary value ("Lietke's sentences hit the reader on the head like flails, like mauls, it is difficult to finish them in their tedious manner, because boredom is everywhere..."); he also assessed the story as insufficiently fantastic and criticized members of the Polish fandom who voted for the story to receive awards as not having good enough taste.

The reviews in Nowa Fantastyka were controversial with fans. Oramus's review was criticized in depth in the fanzine Esensja by Konrad Wagrowski, who found it poorly argued and offensive, especially to younger science fiction fans. Wagrowski although argued, like Dukaj, that the story had been misunderstood by critics who were not interested in and familiar with the Internet culture. The April issue of Nowa Fantastyka printed six letters to the editor about "Critics about CyberJoly Drim", four of which defended the story and one of which criticized it.

=== Later reviews ===
The story has received several reviews in the later years. Two of them were critical, with Andrzej Zimniak in Nowa Fantastyka in 2008 finding it to be "literarily mediocre" and undeserving of its awards; while Krzysztof Głuch in Czas Kultury in 2011 focused on its prior publication on the Internet and its use of Internet slang which he saw as already dated and gimmicky. Liedtke was widely seen as an outsider to the SF scene, described as such in Zimniak's review.

On the other hand, in 2004, Wojciech Orliński wrote positively about the story in Gazeta Wyborcza, writing that the story "brilliantly reflects" the problem of how for some people the "virtual" world is more interesting than the "real" one. Maria Głowacka, writing in 2013 for Wielogłos, concluded that the controversy and criticism were related to the fact that the author was a woman from the Internet community, while the negative opinions about the text in industry magazines were made "exclusively by male writers-critics", which, according to her, indicates the "closet nature of the Polish science fiction industry". Regarding the charge that the story was insufficiently SF, Michał Cetnarowski in 2020 wrote for the culture.pl portal that thanks to elements such as "implants, cyberspaces and virtual realities" the story "passes the "full-fledged cyberpunk" test without any problems". In 2022, Stanisław Krawczyk located the rejection of the story by Parowski and Oramus in a dispute that was going on at the time between them (primarily Parowski) and a group of fans and critics from the Polish science fiction and fantasy fandom, whom Parowski labelled "fans of entertainment fantasy". At around the same time, Parowski himself, in his autobiographical book on the history of that community, mentioned Liedtke's story in the context of his "unwise war on fandom" and admitted that he "missed the real change in audience tastes".

In addition to literary criticism, the story has been subject to scholarly analysis, focusing not on its literary values, but on its themes. Grażyna Gajewska analyzed the story from the perspective of feminist literary criticism and the relationship between humans and technology. She focused on the heroine's marginalization of her corporeality and the simultaneous presentation of cyberspace as a space friendly to women. Similarly, in 2021, Przemysław Czapliński stated that the heroine's abandonment of her body in favor of an online existence "constituted a form of rebellion against the patriarchal appropriation of the body that dominates in real life".
