= Łukasz Orbitowski =

Polish writer

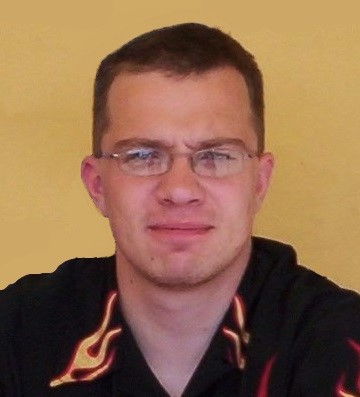
- Łukasz Orbitowski at Polcon 2005 in Błażejewko, August 2005.
- Born: 26 October 1977 (age 48)
- Education: Jagiellonian University
- Writing career
- Language: Polish
- Period: modern
- Genres: horror, fantasy
- Notable work: Tracę ciepło
- Website: orbitowski.pl

Łukasz Orbitowski (born 26 October 1977) is a Polish essayist and fantasy and horror writer. As of April 2012 he has published six novels and numerous short stories, collected in four anthologies.

== Biography ==
Orbitowski is alumnus of the Jagiellonian University, with a degree in philosophy.

He debuted in 1999 with a short story anthology, Złe Wybrzeża. His debut in fantasy genre was with the 2001 story Diabeł na Jabol Hill in the first issue of the Polish magazine Science Fiction. In addition to Science Fiction, his stories have appeared in Machina, Nowa Fantastyka and the Polish edition of Playboy. Most of his works fall in the fantasy and horror genre, although he has published one children's book (Prezes i Kreska).

He is a co-author of the script for the CG movie by Tomasz Bagiński about the Warsaw Uprising, Hardkor'44. He also developed the role-playing game Bakemono.

He also publishes essays in the Przekrój magazine (from 2006–2008, and from 2010 till present). Orbitowski identifies as an atheist.

== Reception ==
His 2007 novel Tracę ciepło has been nominated for the Janusz A. Zajdel Award. This novel has also received the Krakowska Książka Miesiąca (Kraków Book of the Month) award.

Maciej Robert in the Życie Warszawy newspaper has noted that Orbitowski is "developing into a Polish Stephen King."

He was one of the pioneers of horror stories set in mundane Polish backgrounds, in the modern cities of Kraków, Warsaw and Wrocław.

== Works ==
As of April 2012, Orbitowski has published six novels and numerous short stories, collected in four anthologies. Two more novels are officially planned, one with a release date for 2012, one not yet announced.

Since 2010, Orbitowski's novel Warszawiacy is being published online in installments.

- Złe Wybrzeża – short story anthology, Związek Literatów Polskich 1999
- Szeroki, głęboki, wymalować wszystko – short story anthology, Ha!art 2001
- Wigilijne psy – short story anthology, Editio 2005
- Horror show, Ha!art 2006
- Tracę ciepło, Wydawnictwo Literackie 2007
- Pies i klecha, t. 1. Przeciwko wszystkim, Fabryka Słów 2007, with Jarosław Urbaniuk
- Prezes i Kreska. Jak koty tłumaczą sobie świat, Powergraph 2008
- Pies i klecha, t. 2. Tancerz, Fabryka Słów 2008, with Jarosław Urbaniuk
- Święty Wrocław, Wydawnictwo Literackie 2009
- Nadchodzi – short story anthology, Wydawnictwo Literackie 2010
- Widma, Wydawnictwo Literackie 2012
- Ogień, Narodowe Centrum Kultury 2012
- Szczęśliwa ziemia, Wydawnictwo SQN 2013
- Rękopis znaleziony w gardle – short story anthology, BookRage 2014
- Zapiski Nosorożca. Moja podróż po drogach, bezdrożach i legendach Afryki, Wydawnictwo SQN 2014
- Inna dusza, Od Deski Do Deski 2015
- Rzeczy utracone, Zwierciadło 2017
- Exodus, Wydawnictwo SQN 2017
- Kult, Świat Książki 2019
- Chodź ze mną, Świat Książki 2022
- Inna dusza, Świat Książki 2022 (New edition)
- Wróg, Świat Książki 2024
