= Magdalena Kozak (writer) =

Polish writer and military officer

- Born: 25 June 1971 (age 55); Warsaw, Poland
- Allegiance: Poland
- Branch: Polish Air Force
- Service years: at least since 2010
- Rank: Lieutenant colonel
- Conflicts: War in Afghanistan (2001–2021)
- Awards: Gwiazda Afganistanu, Iraq

Magdalena Kozak (born 25 June 1971 in Warsaw) is a Polish writer of speculative fiction. She is also a career military officer and emergency physician, and served as a parachute-trained paramedic during Polish deployments to Afghanistan in the early 2010s.

She has a strong interest in the military: she is an experienced parachutist and practices shooting (as an instructor and sports shooting judge). She studied medicine.

== Military service ==
A military physician specializing in emergency medicine, she served in the 2nd Search and Rescue Group. She participated in Polish missions in Afghanistan (7th and 12th rotations of the Polish Military Contingent in Afghanistan, in 2010 and 2012). During the latter mission, she was wounded. Later she also served in Polish military missions in Iraq and Turkey.

In 2012 she graduated from the General Tadeusz Kościuszko Military University of Land Forces. In August 2012, President Bronisław Komorowski awarded her the Gwiazda Afganistanu.

She is an experienced parachutist, having completed over 300 jumps by 2017. On 29 July 2017, she became the ceremonial godmother of the Gulfstream G550 aircraft “General Kazimierz Pułaski”.

Her rank progressed from second lieutenant in 2015, to lieutenant in 2017, to captain in 2019. She worked in the emergency department of the Military Institute of Medicine. In May 2025 she was promoted to lieutenant colonel at the Military Institute of Aviation Medicine.

== Literary career ==
Kozak's fiction is frequently noted for combining speculative premises with detailed and technically credible depictions of military life, reflecting her professional experience, it has often been classified as military science fiction.

Her literary debut was the short story Nuda, published in the online magazine Fahrenheit, where she served as an editor from 2005 to 2011. The story, a humorous pastiche of fairy tales about a princess guarded by a dragon, marked the beginning of her engagement with genre fiction. She has since published over two dozen short stories, often in Nowa Fantastyka, Science Fiction, and Esensja.

Her longest and best-known work is the Vesper series, which began in 2006 with Nighter, also her novel debut. The series blends urban fantasy with military science fiction, and follows a young counter-intelligence officer who becomes a vampire. It was followed by Renegat and Nikt, all three nominated for the Janusz A. Zajdel Award (for 2006, 2007, and 2008 respectively). The fourth installment, Młody, was published on 24 May 2017, followed by the fifth, Gracz, on 18 June 2025. The first four volumes of the series have been translated into English (published in 2017 and 2018 by New Zealand publisher Cheeky Kea Printworks as, respectively, Nighter, Renegade, Nobody, and Inanite); it is one of the relatively few works of Polish speculative fiction to reach an international readership.

Her novel Fiolet (2010) is a near-future military SF thriller in which extraterrestrial violet-colored plants capable of releasing hydrogen cyanide begin colonizing Earth. A military unit is tasked with destroying the organisms during orbital descent. While the novel incorporates science fiction elements, critical attention has focused on its realistic and dynamic portrayal of military operations and parachuting.

Łzy diabła (2015) is a military fantasy set on a desert planet shaped by foreign intervention and internal conflict, drawing clear parallels to Afghanistan. The novel combines elements of planetary romance with a setting influenced by real-world geopolitics, depicting a world affected by exploitation of a valuable narcotic resource.

Among her more overtly fantasy-oriented works, Paskuda & Co. (2012) expands on the humorous tone of her early short fiction, while Minas Warsaw (2020) presents a comedic urban fantasy scenario in which modern Warsaw is overtaken by a powerful wizard who establishes his seat in the Palace of Culture and Science and arrives riding a dragon.

=== Novels ===
Vesper series (Wampiry w ABW)

- Nighter, Fabryka Słów, 2006, ISBN 9788379640805
  - in English: Nighter, Cheeky Kea Printworks, 2017, ISBN 978-0-473-41902-8
- Renegat, Fabryka Słów, 2007, ISBN 9788379640812
  - in English: Renegade, Cheeky Kea Printworks, 2017, ISBN 978-0-473-43321-5
- Nikt, Fabryka Słów, 2008, ISBN 9788379640829
  - in English: Nobody, Cheeky Kea Printworks, 2018, ISBN 978-0-473-44484-6
- Młody, Fabryka Słów, 2017, ISBN 9788379642380
  - in English: Inanite, Cheeky Kea Printworks, 2018, ISBN 978-0-473-44486-0
- Gracz, WarBook, 2025, ISBN 978-83-68264-29-6

Other

- Fiolet, Bellona / RUNA, 2010, ISBN 9788311123137
- Paskuda & Co., Fabryka Słów, 2012
- Łzy diabła, Insignis, 2015, ISBN 9788379645954
- Minas Warsaw, Fabryka Słów, 2020, ISBN 9788379645732

=== Short stories ===
Dragon Paskuda cycle

- Nuda, December 2003, Fahrenheit
- Pryszcze, March 2004, Fahrenheit
- Interes, June 2004, Fahrenheit
- Czarna chmura, July 2004, Fahrenheit
- Zbójcy, July 2004, Fahrenheit
- Ekonom, September 2005, Fahrenheit
- Zapalmy choinkę, December 2005, Fahrenheit
- Pojedynek, March 2006, Fahrenheit
- Trubadur, August 2006, Fahrenheit
- Misja niemożebna, November–December 2007, Fahrenheit

Other

- Pędziwiatr, July 2004, Esensja
- Strój, October 2004, Esensja
- Świeczka, October 2004, Esensja
- Operacja „Faust”, Science Fiction
- Świt, January 2005, Fahrenheit
- Polowanie na jednorożce, January 2006, Nowa Fantastyka
- Nielegalna Krew, Science Fiction, Fantasy & Horror
- Cynglarze, Science Fiction 6/2006
- Miasta tysiąca słońc, January 2007, Nowa Fantastyka
- Stoliczek, January 2010, Nowa Fantastyka
- Strasznie mi się podobasz, in Strasznie mi się podobasz (2011)
- Um Dabadib, Pismo. Magazyn opinii special issue 2021
- Ostatni strzał strachu, in Gladiatorzy (2020)

== Awards and nominations ==
She received a number of literary award nominations:

Year	Award	Work	Result
2005	Nautilus Award	Operacja „Faust”	Nominated
2006	Nautilus Award	Cynglarze	Nominated
2006	Janusz A. Zajdel Award	Nocarz	Nominated
2006	Nautilus Award	Nocarz	Nominated
2007	Janusz A. Zajdel Award	Renegat	Nominated
2007	Nautilus Award	Renegat	Nominated
2008	Janusz A. Zajdel Award	Nikt	Nominated
2008	Janusz A. Zajdel Award	Sznurki przeznaczenia	Nominated
2011	Janusz A. Zajdel Award	Strasznie mi się podobasz	Nominated
2015	Janusz A. Zajdel Award	Łzy diabła	Nominated
2016	Jerzy Żuławski Literary Award	Łzy diabła	Nominated
