= Istvan Vizvary =

Polish science fiction writer

Istvan Vizvary (born April 22, 1975) is a Polish science fiction writer.

He was born in Łódź to the family of Hungarian father and Polish mother. With education in mathematics (University of Łódź), he works as a software engineer. He published a number of short stories and novels.

== Books ==
- 2017: Vivo
- 2023: Lagrange. Listy z Ziemi (Lagrange. Letters from the Earth)
  From publisher's book cover: "Year 2069. Ecological catastrophe has deprived man of illusions of domination over Earth. However, dreams of colonizing planets around other stars are still alive. ESS Steropes goes with a three-person crew on a trial cruise to the vicinity of Saturn, to study the oceans of its moons and the old, abandoned space station. However, the test of new technologies quickly turns into a test for man"

== Awards ==
- 2024: Polish Book of the Year award from Nowa Fantastyka magazine for the book Lagrange. Listy z Ziemi (Lagrange. Letters from the Earth, 2023).
- 2024: Janusz A. Zajdel Award for Lagrange. Listy z Ziemi.
- 2024: Jerzy Żuławski Literary Award for Lagrange. Listy z Ziemi.
