= Bielak =

Bielak is a surname. Notable people with the surname include:

- Brandon Bielak (born 1996), American baseball pitcher
- Edyta Bielak-Jomaa (born 1972), Polish lawyer and professor
- Jacobo Bielak, Mexican-born structural engineer
- Józef Bielak (1741–1794), Polish-Lithuanian military officer
- Lukáš Bielák (born 1986), Slovak footballer
- Piotr Bielak (born 1976), Polish footballer
- Wiesław Bielak (1943–2022), Polish sculptor
