= Czarna msza =

Anthology of Polish science fiction stories

- Editor: Wojtek Sedeńko
- Language: Polish
- Genre: science fiction
- Publisher: Rebis Publishing House
- Publication date: 1992
- Publication place: Poland
- Media type: anthology

Czarna msza (Black Mass) is an anthology of Polish science fiction stories in the klerykal fiction genre, published in 1992 by Rebis Publishing House, edited by Wojtek Sedeńko.

== History ==
In the introduction to the anthology, Sedeńko mentioned that the theme of the anthology emerged as the main topic of the second volume of contemporary Polish science fiction stories (following the first volume, Wizje alternatywne [Alternative Visions], where this theme was already signaled in some texts) at the convention in Gdańsk in 1990: "A group of writers decided that this should be a mono-thematic collection, with God, religion, and the church serving as the leitmotif". The title was proposed by Andrzej Sapkowski.

The editor noted that "with the exception of three, all the stories were written specifically for Czarna msza".

== Table of contents ==
- Grzegorz Drukarczyk – Raj utracony (Paradise Lost)
- Tadeusz Oszubski – Interregnum
- Jacek Inglot – Umieraj z nami (Die with Us)
- Jacek Sobota – Rzeka (River)
- Andrzej Drzewiński – Dopust Boży (God's Permission)
- Rafał A. Ziemkiewicz – Źródło bez wody (Source Without Water)
- Eugeniusz Dębski – …więc chyba to był On… (…So It Must Have Been Him…)
- Jacek Dukaj – Korporacja Mesjasz (Messiah Corporation)
- Mirosław P. Jabłoński – Spotkanie na końcu drogi (Meeting at the End of the Road)
- Jarosław Grzędowicz – Dom na Krawędzi Światła (House on the Edge of Light)
- Jacek Piekara – Dom na Krawędzi Ciemności (House on the Edge of Darkness)

Some texts appeared in the retrospective anthology Wizje alternatywne (Alternative Visions), published in 2019 (Stalker Books, 2019).

== Analysis and criticism ==
In the introduction to the anthology, Sedeńko noted that "I chose [the stories] that I considered the best; when selecting, I avoided like the plague the pro or anti criterion", and also that "this anthology serves as a reliable test of the condition of Polish science fiction and may bring it the scouting efficiency of an ‘early response system’. That was [its] goal".

Marcin Zwierzchowski wrote that the publication of the anthology confirmed the existence of "a phenomenon characteristic only for Poland, klerycal fiction, meaning stories referencing matters of faith or the church".

Jacek Dukaj analyzes that the anthology was intended to present "the tendency [...] of a strong church involvement in politics, which provoked anti-church sentiments and movements". However, science fiction "did not go in that direction".

Adam Mazurkiewicz assesses that the anthology distinctly reflects the "diversity of aesthetics and ideological proposals significant for the beginnings of religious science fiction [...]. From a retrospective perspective, it can be regarded as a summa of authorial proposals for presenting religious themes in science fiction literature; this is how the editor perceived it".
