= Robert Wegner =

Polish fantasy writer

Robert M. Wegner
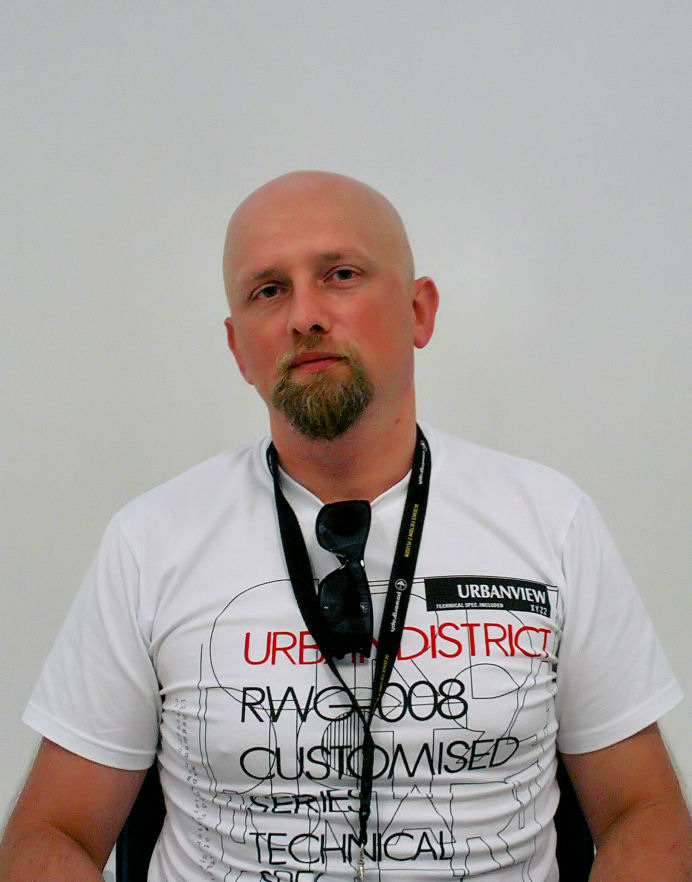
- Robert M. Wegner on Polcon 2010.
- Citizenship: Polish
- Occupation: Writer
- Writing career
- Language: Polish
- Period: 2002–present
- Genre: Fantasy
- Notable work: Tales from Meekhanese Border series
- Notable awards: Janusz A. Zajdel Award; Sfinks Award; Eurocon Encouragement Award

Robert M. Wegner is a Polish fantasy writer, winner of six Janusz A. Zajdel Awards.

Wegner got his first Zajdel Award in 2009, for his short story We All are Meekhanees (pol. Wszyscy jesteśmy Meekhańczykami) and first Sfinks Award in 2010 for short-story The Best You Can Buy (pol. Najlepsze, jakie można kupić).

He made his debut in 2002 in Science Fiction magazine with short-story The Last Flight of Night Cowboy (pol. Ostatni lot Nocnego Kowboja). In 2009 and 2010, he published two collections of short stories called Tales from Meekhanese Border (pol. Opowieści z meekhańskiego pogranicza), later followed by a series of sequel novels
