= Agnieszka Hałas =

Polish author, molecular biologist

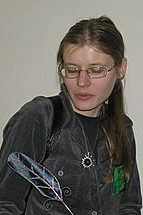
Hałas in 2012

Agnieszka Anna Hałas (born December 31, 1980) is a Polish fantasy author, and a molecular biologist by education (Ph.D.).

She is native of Lublin. During 1999-2004 she studied biotechnology at the Maria Curie-Skłodowska University and earned her Ph.D. from German Cancer Research Center, Heidelberg (2010), but did not pursue scientific work further and since then she has been writing speculative fiction and translating . She is a member of an informal association of women writers Harda Horda.

She made her literary debut in 1998 with the short story "Białe dłonie" when she was finishing high school.

Since 2021 she is a co-editor of the Polish speculative fiction magazine Nowa Fantastyka.

== Awards ==
- 2010: 1st place at the competition "Horyzonty Wyobraźni" ("Horizons of Imagination") for the short story "Córka sztukmistrza"
- 2021: Janusz A. Zajdel Award for short story Czerń nie zapomina (2020)
- 2024: Janusz A. Zajdel Award for short story Świerszcze w soli (2023)
