= Marek Baraniecki =

Polish science fiction writer

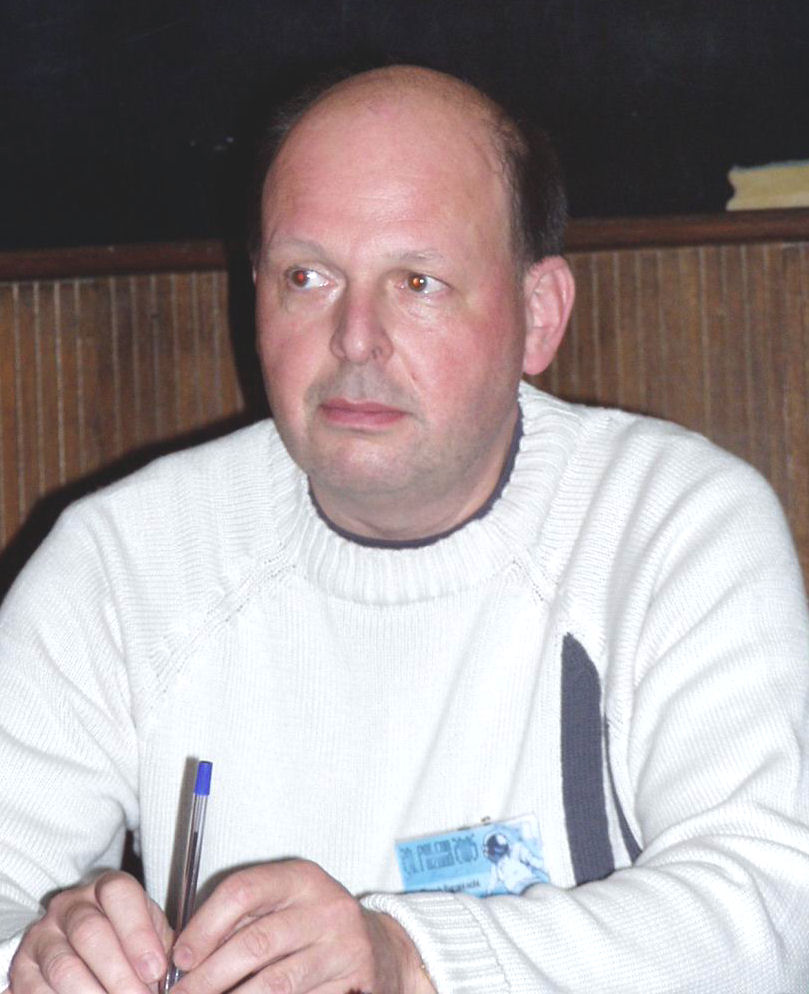
Marek Baraniecki at Polcon 2005

Marek Baraniecki (born June 16, 1954) is a Polish science fiction writer and journalist. He graduated in environmental engineering. In 1985 he published a short story collection Głowa Kasandry, and for a novel with the same title he was given the Janusz A. Zajdel Award.

Marek Baraniecki was born on June 16, 1954, in Gliwice, Poland. A graduate of Silesian University of Technology, for several years he worked as an environmental engineer before committing himself to journalism and writing. His literary début was "Karlgoro godzina 18" ("Karlgoro, 6pm"), a short story published in Fantastyka magazine.

The best-known of his works however is a novel titled Głowa Kasandry (Cassandra's Head) published for the first time in 1985 and instantly awarded the Janusz A. Zajdel Award. Set in a post-apocalyptic world, in 2004 Głowa Kasandry was voted by Gazeta Wyborcza's readers one of the top seven post-apocalyptic novels of all times, alongside the works by Jack London, Herbert Wells and Stephen King.

In late 2000s, Polish film director Paweł Czarzasty announced that he wants to adapt Głowa Kasandry for cinema under a working title Cassandra. Science fiction drama and is working on its screenplay

== Sources ==
- Andrzej Niewiadomski, Antoni Smuszkiewicz, Leksykon polskiej literatury fantastycznonaukowej, Wydawnictwo Poznańskie, Poznań 1990, ISBN 83-210-0892-5
