= Eugeniusz Dębski =

Polish science-fiction writer and translator

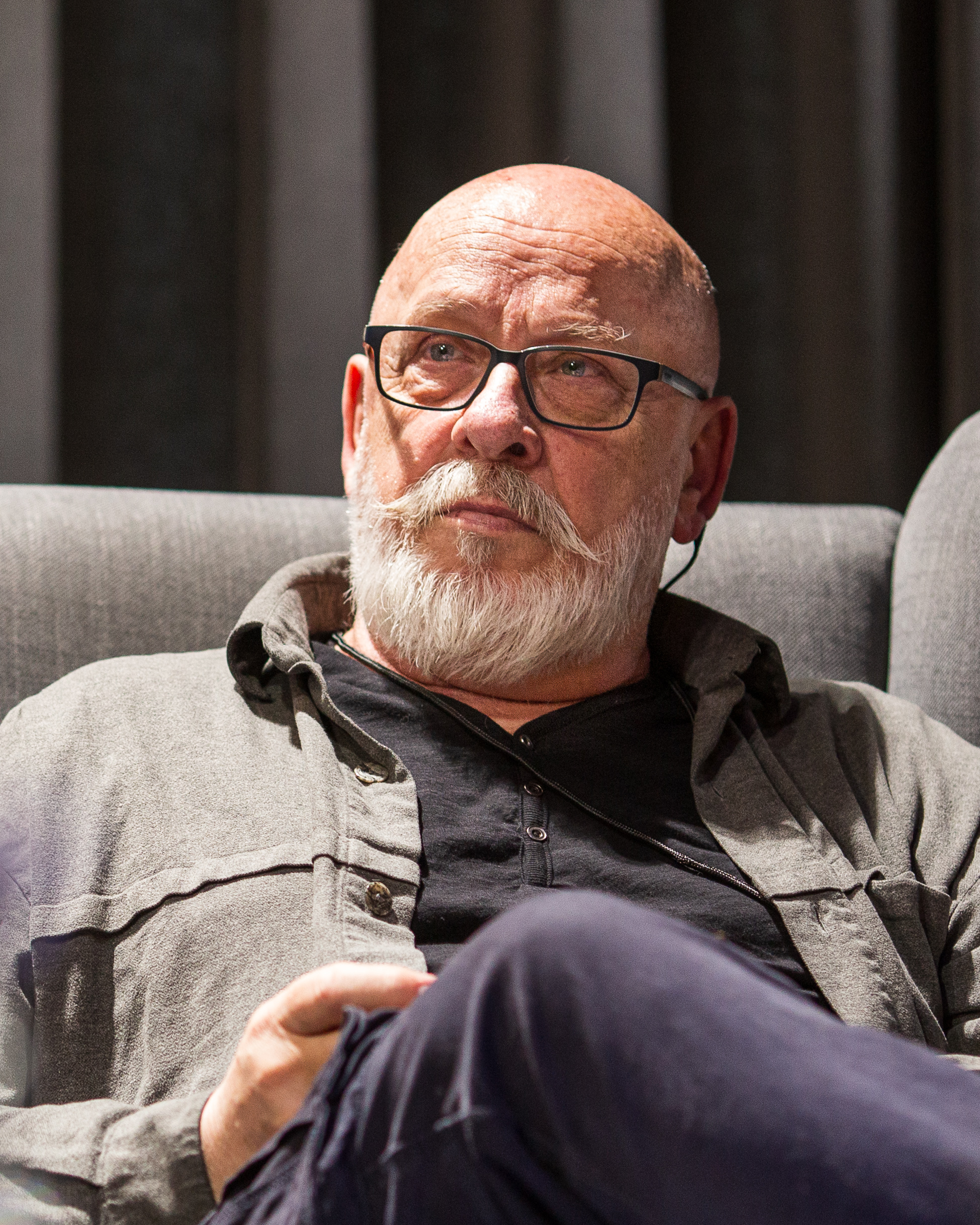
- Born: 26 January 1952 (age 74); Truskavets
- Education: Wrocław University
- Writing career
- Pen name: EuGeniusz
- Genre: science fiction
- Notable work: Fahrenheit
- Website: eugeniuszdebski.pl

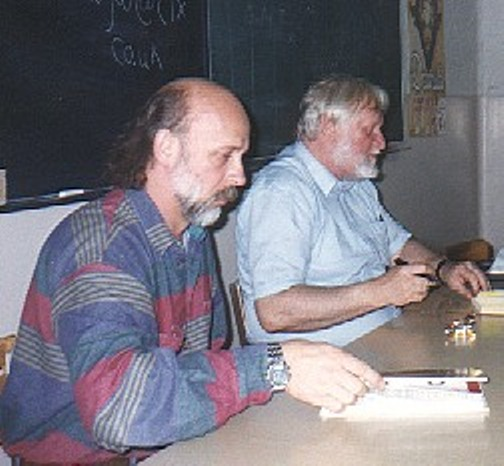
Dębski with Kir Bulychev (far)

Eugeniusz Dębski (b. 26 January 1952; sometimes referred to as EuGeniusz, a word-play coined after the Polish word for genius) is a Polish science-fiction writer and translator of Russian literature.

Born in Truskavets (then in USSR), early in his life he moved to Poland to settle in Wrocław where he graduated from the Russian faculty of Wrocław University. He is known primarily as the author of numerous novels (mostly science fiction and fantasy), and several hundred short stories, published in Polish journals including Fantastyka, Nowa Fantastyka, Science Fiction, Fenix and Portal.

Dębski translated and published a large part of the Russian classics of science fiction, from Kir Bulychov, through Nikolai Perumov, Vladimir Vasiliev, Vyacheslav Rybakov, to Kirill Yeskov. Four times nominated to the Janusz A. Zajdel Award, he was also awarded the Śląkfa, as well as two prizes created for him by fans: the Mątwa and the Srebrna Muszla.

He was one of the creators and the chief editor (2002–2004) of Fahrenheit, the first Polish Internet science fiction fanzine.
