= Magdalena Kozak =

Magdalena Kozak can refer to:

- Magdalena Kozak (chess player) (born 1988), Polish chess player
- Magdalena Kozak (writer) (born 1971), Polish speculative fiction writer
