= Anna Brzezińska (writer) =

Polish writer

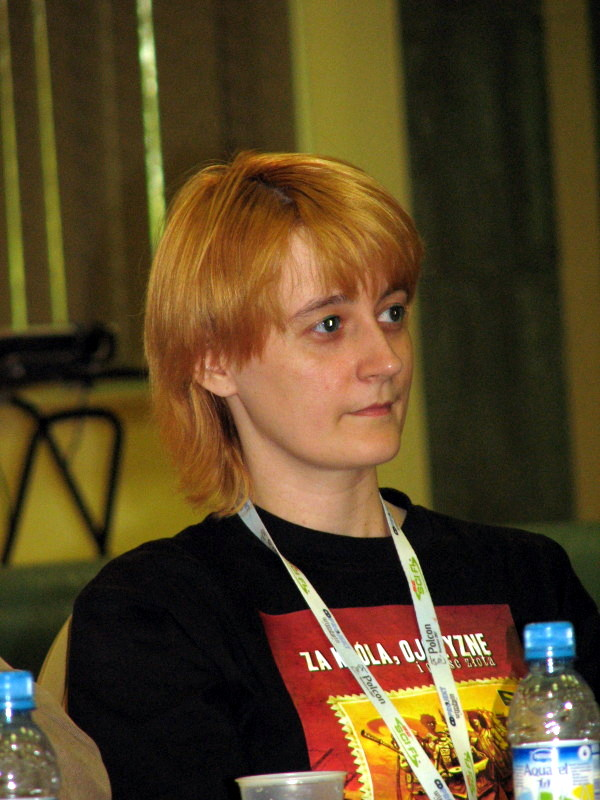
Anna Brzezińska at Polcon 2007 convention in Warsaw.

Anna Brzezińska (born 1971) is a Polish writer.

== Biography ==
Brzezińska was born in 1971. She was born in Opole and currently lives in Warsaw. She graduated in history at the Catholic University of Lublin and defended her PhD thesis in medieval history at the Central European University in Budapest. Her literary debut was her short story "A kochał ją, że strach", published in 1998 in the Magia i Miecz magazine, for which she received the Janusz A. Zajdel Award. Later she won the Zajdel Award also for the novel Żmijowa harfa and the short story Wody głębokie jak niebo. Brzezińska is a co-owner of the RUNA publishing house. In the Internet she uses the nickname Sigrid.

== Bibliography ==
=== Novels ===
- Zbójecki Gościniec (Bandit's Highway) - NOWA (1999); revised version published as Plewy na wietrze (Chaff in the Wind) - RUNA (2006)
- Żmijowa harfa (A Drake Harp) - NOWA (2000)
- Letni deszcz. Kielich (Summer Rain. Cup) - RUNA (2004)
- Za króla, ojczyznę i garść złota (For the King, the Country and the Handful of Gold) - in collaboration with Grzegorz Wiśniewski, RUNA 2007
- Na ziemi niczyjej (On No Man's Land) - in collaboration with Grzegorz Wiśniewski, RUNA 2008
- Letni deszcz. Sztylet (Summer Rain. Dagger) - RUNA (2009)
- Córki Wawelu. Opowieść o jagiellońskich królewnach (Daughters of Wawel. The story of the Jagiellonian princesses), Kraków, Wydawnictwo Literackie, 2017.

=== Short story collections ===
- Opowieści z Wilżyńskiej Doliny (Tales from the Wilzynska Valley) - RUNA (2002)
- Wody głębokie jak niebo (Waters as Deep as the Sky) - RUNA (2005)
- Wiedźma z Wilżyńskiej Doliny (The Witch of the Wilzynska Valley) - RUNA (2010)

=== Translations to English ===
Her story "A kochał ją, że strach" has been translated to English by Agnieszka Sylwanowicz as “And He Loved Her Till It Hurt” in the Chosen by Fate: Zajdel Award Winners Anthology (2000).
