= Anna Kańtoch =

Polish writer

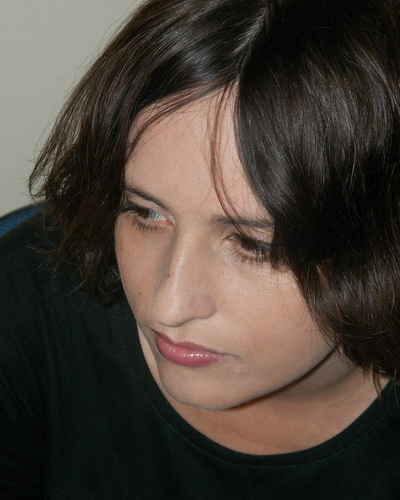
- Portrait of Kańtoch, 2010
- Born: December 28, 1976 (age 49); Katowice, Katowice Voivodeship, Polish People's Republic
- Organization: ŚKF
- Writing career
- Education: Jagiellonian University
- Occupation: Novelist
- Pen name: Anneke
- Language: Polish
- Years active: 2004 - present
- Genres: Fantasy and crime
- Website: Anna Kańtoch on Instagram

Anna Kańtoch (28 December 1976 in Katowice, Poland) is a Polish writer of fantasy and crime fiction. She has published seventeen novels and numerous short stories.

Her 2008 short story Światy Dantego, 2010 short story Duchy w maszynach, 2013 short story Człowiek nieciągły, 2014 short story Sztuka porozumienia and 2009 novel Przedksiężycowi all received the Janusz A. Zajdel Award. She also received the Jerzy Żuławski Award for her 2012 novel Czarne.
