= Radek Rak =

Polish writer (born 1987)

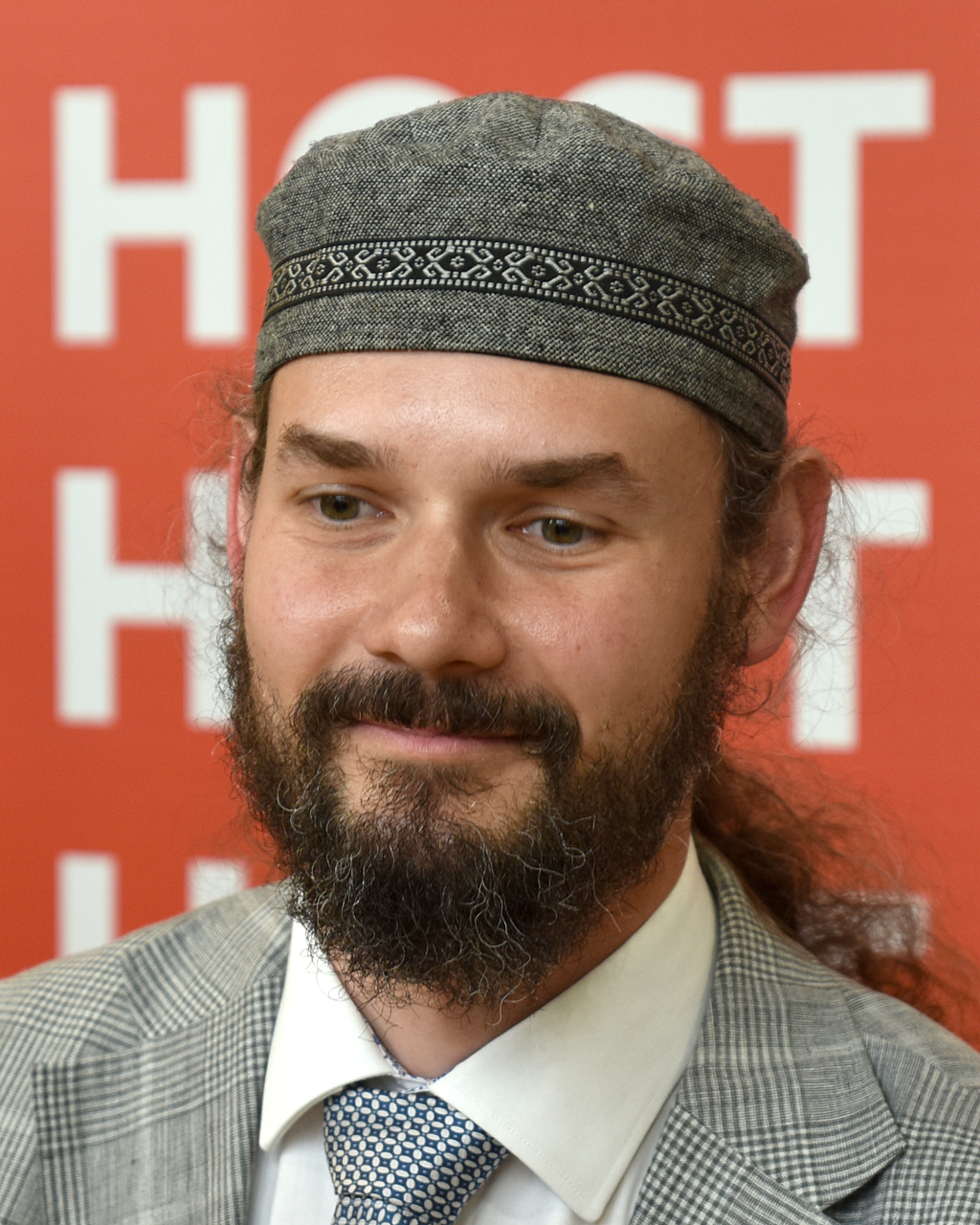
- Radek Rak (2024)
- Born: 1987 (age 38–39) Dębica
- Occupation: Veterinarian, writer
- Citizenship: Polish

Radek Rak (born 1987) is a Polish veterinarian best known as a writer of fantasy literature.

He authored both novels and short stories. His novels are winners of several Polish literary awards. With the 2015 short story "Kwiaty paproci" ("Fern Flowers") he took part in the project Polish Legends.

Baśń o wężowym sercu was adapted into an opera by Aleksander Nowak and for stage by Beniamin Maria Bukowski.

He is married and a resident of Kraków.

== Novels ==
- Kocham cię, Lilith ["I love you, Lilith"] (2014, debut novel)

Robert Z., a patient of a sanatorium is involved with "demonic painter Iwona" and the "intriguing doctor Małgorzata". But suddenly Iwona disappears and it turns out that nobody but Robert ever saw her... The novel, starting realistrically, gradually turns out into a dreamlike, illogical, fantastic tale... Eventually the titular Lilith appears as well...

- Puste niebo ["Empty Sky"] (2016)

From publisher's review: "The novel was created out of longing for times gone by, a city that never existed and a history that could not have happened. Puste niebo tells the story of magical Lublin, extraordinary inhabitants of the former Kresy ["Eastern Borderlands"] and strange creatures from the borderlands of the afterlife. Radek Rak's novel is magical realism in its original Polish edition". The protagonist, Tołpi, a naive youth, smashes the Moon and has to make a new one, because the life without the Moon is disrupted.
It was nominated for the Janusz A. Zajdel Award and won the Gold Distinction of the Jerzy Żuławski Literary Award.

- Baśń o wężowym sercu albo wtóre słowo o Jakóbie Szeli ["Fairytale about Snake's Heart, or Second Word about Jakob Szela"] (2019)

The novel is loosely based on the legends about Jakub Szela, the leader of a 1846 peasant uprising known as the Galician slaughter.
The novel won several Polish literary awards, including the Janusz A. Zajdel Award, the Nike Award, the Nowa Fantastyka Award (Polish Book of the Year category) and the Jerzy Żuławski Literary Award.

- Agla. Alef (2022)

From publisher's summary: "Agla is a daring adventure story, but also an insightful and moving psychological novel about growing up and changing, about love and discovering one's physicality, about disappointed friendships, exclusion and loneliness, about finding oneself and becoming a human being in the full sense of the word."
Winner of the Janusz A. Zajdel Award, Jerzy Żuławski Literary Award, Nowa Fantastyka Award (Polish Book of the Year category)

- Agla. Aurora (2023)

From publisher's summary: "Agla. Aurora is a book about how good people accidentally build totalitarianism. And about how the answers to our questions often sound different than we would like them to."
Nominated for Zajdel Award . Nominated for Nowa Fantastyka.

- Agla. Abraxas (2025)
