= Feliks W. Kres =

Polish writer (1966–2022)

Witold Chmielecki (1 June 1966 – 14 October 2022), better known by the pseudonym of Feliks W. Kres, was a Polish fantasy writer. Winner of the Janusz A. Zajdel Award for his 1992 novel Król Bezmiarów.

== Life ==
He debuted with his short story "Mag" (Mage), submitted to a writing contest of the Fantastyka magazine. Kres subsequently published seven novels and dozens of short stories. His pseudonym may be translated as "lucky (or happy) end" – "Felix" in Latin means lucky and "kres" means "the end" in Polish.

Kres was born in Łódź in 1966. He became best known for his two fantasy cycles - Księga całości (The Book of Entirety), which takes place in a world called Szerer, where intelligence, in addition to humans, was given also to cats and vultures, and Piekło i szpada (Hell and épée), dark fantasy set in an alternative 17th century, with demons and beings older than Satan himself. His works have been translated into Czech, Russian and Spanish. Second volume of his Book of the Entirety series won the Janusz A. Zajdel Award.

For several years he ran a guide for young writers in the magazines Fenix, Magia i Miecz, and Science Fiction.

Kres died on 14 October 2022, at the age of 56.

== Works ==
=== Księga całości (Book of the Entirety) ===
- Północna granica (Northern Frontier)
- Król Bezmiarów (King of Infinite Space)
- Grombelardzka legenda (Grombelardian Legend)
- Pani Dobrego Znaku (Lady of the Good Mark)
- Porzucone królestwo (Abandoned Kingdom)
- Tarcza Szerni (Shield of the Shern)
- Żeglarze i jeźdźcy (Sailors and Riders)

=== Zjednoczone królestwa (United Kingdoms) ===
- Strażniczka istnień (Guardian of Beings)
- Piekło i szpada (Hell and épée)
- Klejnot i wachlarz (Jewel and fan)

=== Translations to English ===
His story "Korona Shergardów" has been translated to English by Agata Koc as “The Crown of Shergards” in the Chosen by Fate: Zajdel Award Winners Anthology (2000).
