= Ewa Białołęcka =

Polish fantasy writer

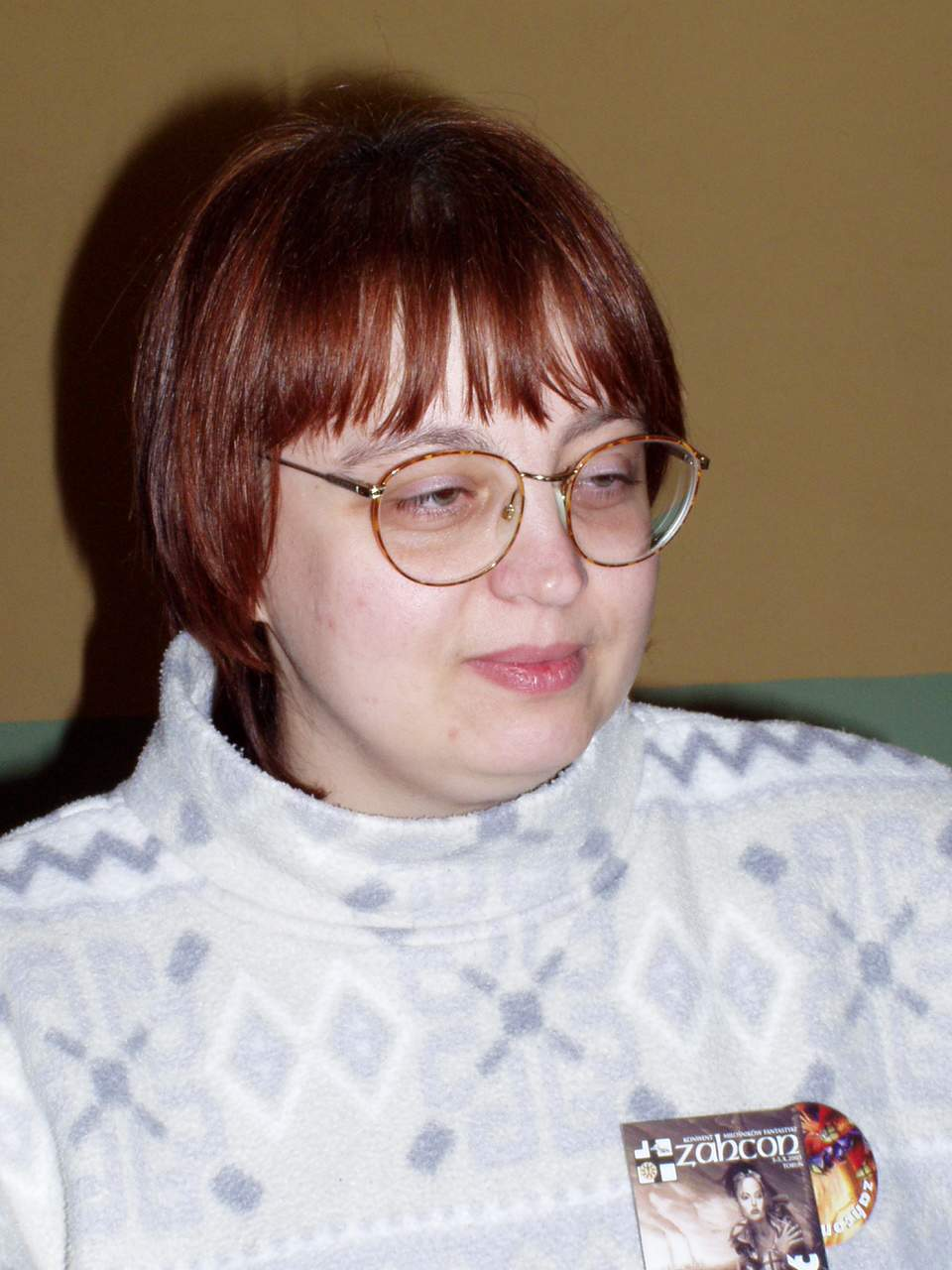
- Born: 14 December 1967 (age 58); Elbląg
- Writing career
- Genre: fantasy

Ewa Białołęcka (born 14 December 1967 in Elbląg) is a Polish fantasy writer. She currently lives in Gdańsk. Her literary debut was her short story Wariatka (Madwoman), published in 1993. Since then she has written more than a dozen short stories, two of which, Tkacz Iluzji (Weaver of Illusions) (1994) and Błękit Maga (Magician's Blue) (1997), were awarded with the Janusz A. Zajdel Award, and another, Nocny śpiewak (The Night Singer), nominated for this award. She also published Piołun i miód (Wormwood and Honey), all of which are part of the Kroniki Drugiego Kręgu (The Chronicles of the Second Circle) series. In 2005, she published Naznaczeni błękitem (Marked with Blue), which is a new version of the Tkacz Iluzji short story collection, made more consistent with the other two novels. Białołęcka also creates stained glass works.

== Works ==
=== Kroniki Drugiego Kręgu series ===
- Kamień na szczycie, 2002
- Piołun i miód, 2003

=== Other novels ===
- Wiedźma.com.pl, 2008

=== Collections ===
- Naznaczeni błękitem, 2005-2011
- Tkacz Iluzji, 1997
- Róża Selerbergu, 2006

=== Translations to English ===
Her story "Jestem Lamia" has been translated to English by Krystyna Nahlik as “I Am Lamia” in the Chosen by Fate: Zajdel Award Winners Anthology (2000).
