= Michał Cholewa (writer) =

Polish writer

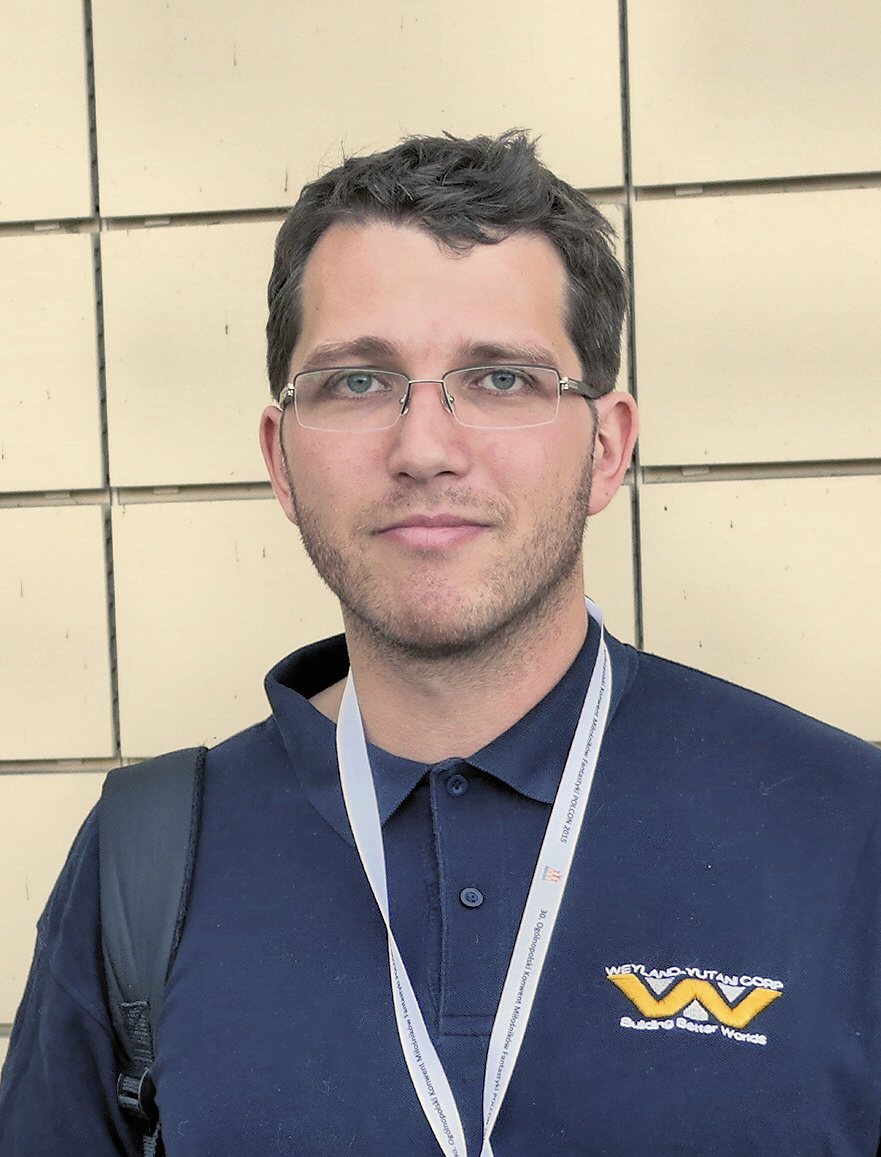
Michał Cholewa in 2015

Michał Cholewa (born 1980) is a Polish fantasy and science fiction writer. He is best known for his military sf series Algorytm wojny. His 2014 book Forta won the Janusz A. Zajdel Award.

== Works ==
Algorytm wojny series

- Gambit, WarBook 2012
- Punkt cięcia, WarBook 2013
- Forta, WarBook 2014
- Inwit, WarBook 2016
- Echa , WarBook 2017
- Sente, WarBook 2018
