= Aleksandra Janusz =

Polish writer, molecular biologist (born 1980)

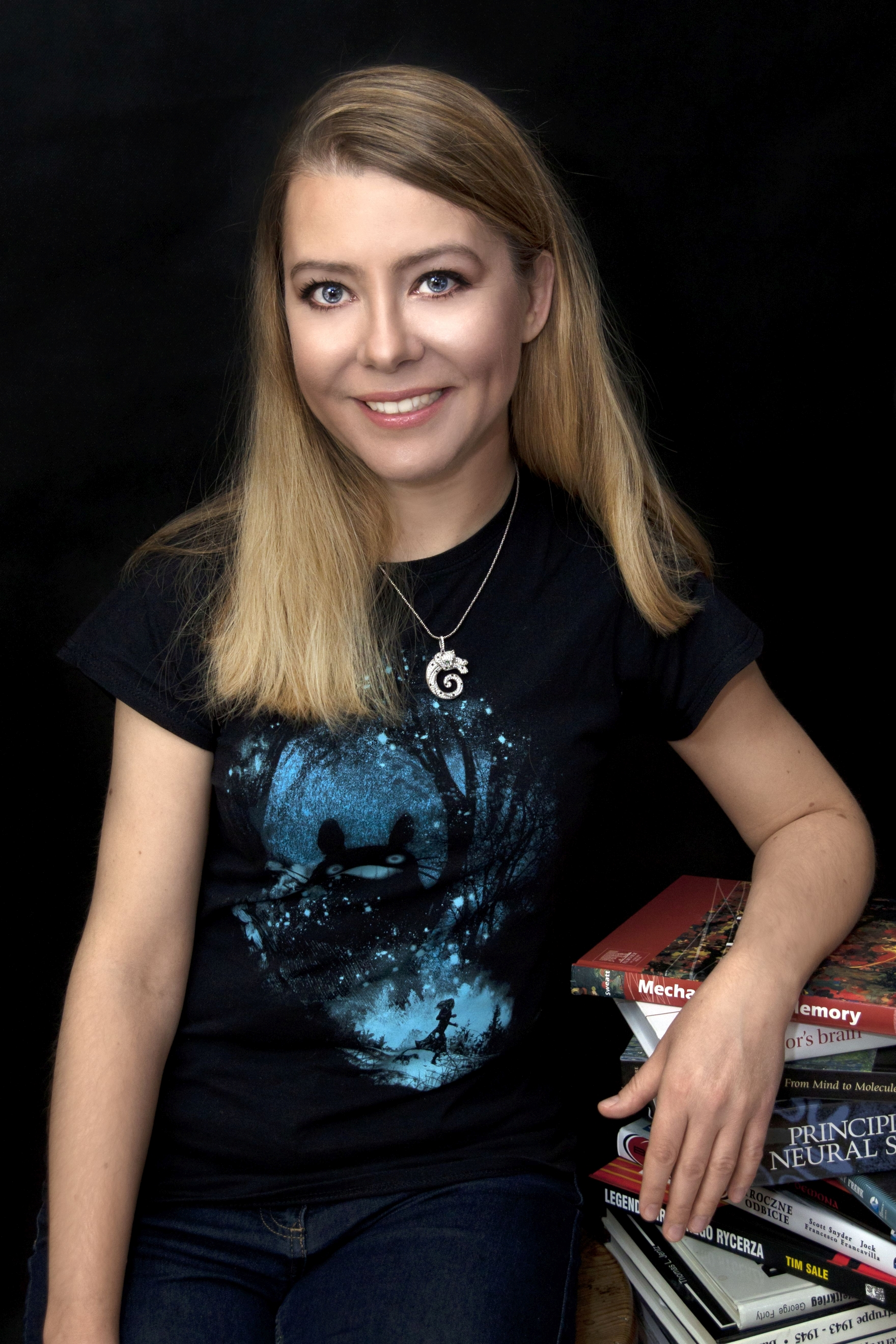
Aleksandra Janusz-Kamińska, 2015

Aleksandra Janusz, full name: Aleksandra Maria Janusz-Kamińska (born May 24, 1980) is a Polish fantasy and science fiction writer and neurobiologist.

As of 2026 she is an Associate Scientist with the Bassell Lab, Department of Cell Biology, Emory University School of Medicine.

== Works ==
=== Notable short stories ===
- 2002: "Z akt miasta Farewell" [From the Records of the Town of Farewell], Science Fiction, no. 4 (14), the debut short story
- 2024: "Dlaczego nie ma klanu kruka" [Why is there no Raven Clan], Janusz A. Zajdel Award

=== "City of Wizards" cycle ===
- 2006, 2018: Dom Wschodzącego Słońca, debut novel
- Mandala (unpublished)

=== "Chronicles of a Torn World" cycle ===
- Asystent czarodziejki (Nasza Księgarnia, June 2016)
- Utracona Bretania (Nasza Księgarnia, September 2016)
- Cień Gildii (Nasza Księgarnia, September 2017, ISBN 9788310131843 fragment)

== Awards and nominations ==
2024: Janusz A. Zajdel Award for the short story "Dlaczego nie ma klanu kruka"
