= Tomasz Pacyński =

Polish fantasy and science fiction author

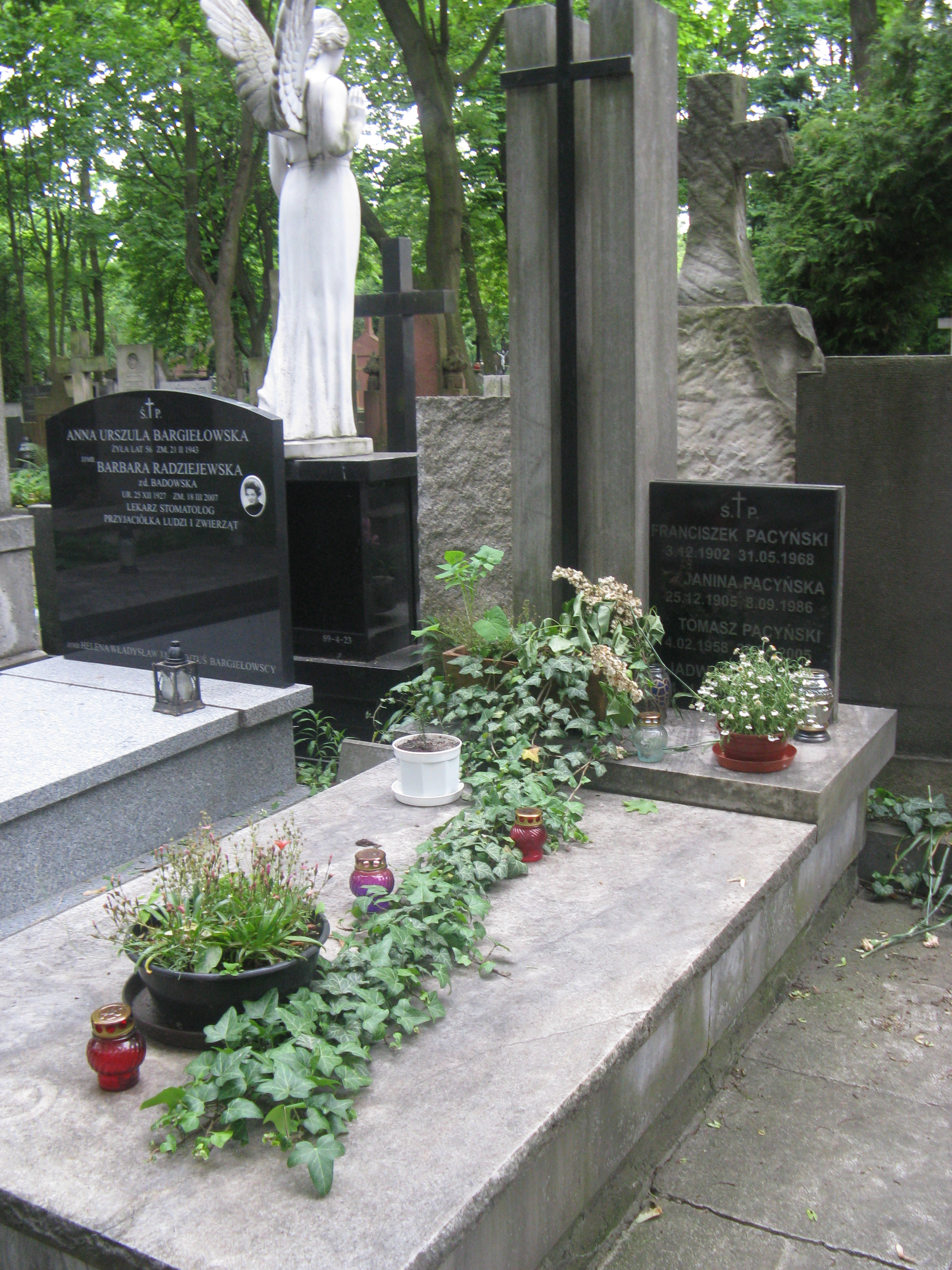
Tomasz Pacyński's grave at the Powązki Cemetery

Tomasz Pacyński (4 February 1958 – 30 May 2005) was a Polish fantasy and science fiction writer, born in Warsaw. He was one of the creators and, from 2004, the chief editor of Fahrenheit, the first Polish Internet science fiction fanzine. He published short stories in such magazines as Science Fiction, SFera, and Fantasy, and in Internet fanzines such as Fahrenheit, Esensja, Fantazin and Srebrny Glob. He also wrote articles published in SFera and Science Fiction.

He made his debut as a fantasy writer with his 2001 novel Sherwood, based on the Robin Hood legend. He published four novels — the Sherwood fantasy trilogy and Wrzesień (September) — a post-apocalyptic political fiction novel, as well as numerous short stories. His humorous stories about Ded Moroz were published in 2005 in Linia ognia (Line of Fire) collection. Sherwood and Wrzesień received nominations for the Janusz A. Zajdel Award. In the Internet he often used the nickname Pacek. His son, Krzysztof Pacyński, is also a writer .

== Bibliography ==
=== Sherwood trilogy ===
- Sherwood - 3,49 2001, RUNA 2003
- Maskarada - RUNA 2003
- Wrota światów. Zła piosenka - RUNA 2004
- Wrota światów. Garść popiołu - RUNA (not published yet)

=== Other books ===
- Wrzesień - RUNA 2002
- Linia ognia - Fabryka Słów 2005 (short stories: "Opowieść wigilijna", "Straty uboczne". "Linia ognia", "Łysa Góra", "Skarby pustyni", "Dobre Mzimu", "Ścieżki wiedźm", "Bajki dla dorosłych")
- Szatański interes - Fabryka Słów 2005
- Smokobójca - Fabryka Słów 2006

=== Short stories ===
- "Siódmy kot" - "Fahrenheit XVI", 2000
- "Koral i smok" - "Fahrenheit i Fantazin", 2000
- "Nagroda" - "Science Fiction" nr 3/2001
- "Nic osobistego" - "Science Fiction" nr 7/2001
- "Dziedzictwo" - "Science Fiction" nr 12/2002
- "Opowieść wigilijna" - Strefa mroku anthology, Bauer 2002, Linia ognia collection, Fabryka Słów 2005
- "Diabelska alternatywa" - "Fahrenheit" XXII, 2002
- "Wspomnienie" - "Fahrenheit" XXVIII, 2003
- "Straty uboczne" - "Fantasy", 2003, Linia ognia collection, Fabryka Słów 2005
- "Linia ognia" - "SFera" nr 6/2003, 'Linia ognia collection, Fabryka Słów 2005
- "Łysa Góra" - "Science Fiction" nr 2/2004, Linia ognia collection, Fabryka Słów 2005
- "Stokrotka na blaszanym dachu" - "Science Fiction" nr 4/2004 (sequel to the novel Wrzesień)
- "Skarby pustyni" - "Science Fiction" nr 7/2004, Linia ognia collection, Fabryka Słów 2005
- "Komu wyje pies" - "Science Fiction" nr 12/2004 (prequel to Sherwood trilogy)
- "Dobre Mzimu" - Linia ognia collection, Fabryka Słów 2005
- "Ścieżki wiedźm" - Linia ognia collection, Fabryka Słów 2005
- "Bajki dla dorosłych" - Linia ognia collection, Fabryka Słów 2005
