= Magazyn Wileński =

Polish-language monthly political magazine in Lithuania

- Categories: Political magazine
- Frequency: Biweekly; Monthly (from 1996)
- Publisher: Union of Poles
- Founder: Michał Mackiewicz; Jan Sienkiewicz
- Founded: 1990
- First issue: 6 January 1990
- Country: Lithuania
- Based in: Vilnius
- Language: Polish
- Website: www.magwil.lt
- ISSN: 0236-4719
- OCLC: 1150404931

Magazyn Wileński (Polish: Vilnius Journal) is a monthly political and cultural magazine based in Lithuania. As of 2005 it was one of four Polish-language print publications in the country.

== History and profile ==
Magazyn Wileński was established in 1990, and the first issue appeared on 6 January that year. The founders were Michał Mackiewicz and Jan Sienkiewicz.

Its headquarters is in Vilnius. The magazine is published by the Union of Poles on a monthly basis. In the first six years Magazyn Wileński was a biweekly publication. In 1996 its publication frequency was made monthly.
