= Marek Oramus =

Polish science fiction writer and journalist

Marek Oramus (born 23 March 1952 in Siepraw) is a Polish science fiction writer and journalist. He graduated from the Silesian University of Technology in 1975. Most of his books and stories belong to the social science fiction genre and were written in the 1990s. Since then most of his writings have been journalistic, humorous, satirical essays, most of them published in the science fiction magazines Fenix and Fantastyka in his Piąte Piwo (Fifth Beer) column. Since 2010 he writes essays for Rzeczpospolita, concerning topics such as rare Earth hypothesis and futurology.

== Publications ==
=== Essay anthologies ===
- Wyposażenie osobiste (Iskry 1987)
- Rozmyślania nad tlenem (Solaris 2001)

=== Short story anthologies ===
- Hieny cmentarne (Śląsk 1989)
- Rewolucja z dostawą na miejsce (Solaris 2002)

=== Novels ===
- Senni zwycięzcy (Czytelnik 1982)
- Arsenał (Iskry 1985)
- Dzień drogi do Meorii (Iskry 1990)
- Święto śmiechu (SuperNOWA 1995)
- Kankan na wulkanie (Prószyński i S-ka 2009)
- Trzeci najazd Marsjan (Media Rodzina 2010)
