= Jacobo Bielak =

Mexican-born structural engineer

Jacobo Bielak is a Mexican-born earthquake engineer. Bielak was raised in Mexico City and earned his bachelor's of science degree from the National Autonomous University of Mexico in 1963. He subsequently attended Rice University in the United States, completing his master's degree in 1966, followed by a doctorate from the California Institute of Technology, graduating in 1971. Bielak taught at Carnegie Mellon University, where he was named Hamerschlag University Professor of Civil and Environmental Engineering, and granted emeritus status upon retirement in 2018.

In 2018, he and his collaborators completed the Quake Project, which helped predict how earthquakes impact urban infrastructure. His early work was the basis for the soil-structure seismic provisions within the National Earthquake Hazards Reduction Program (NEHRP).

Bielak was awarded the Gordon Bell Prize in 2003 for computational research on the effects of future earthquakes in Los Angeles. He was elected to membership of the United States National Academy of Engineering in 2010 "for advancing knowledge and methods in earthquake engineering and in regional-scale seismic motion simulation."
