= Jacek Inglot =

Polish science-fiction writer (born 1962)

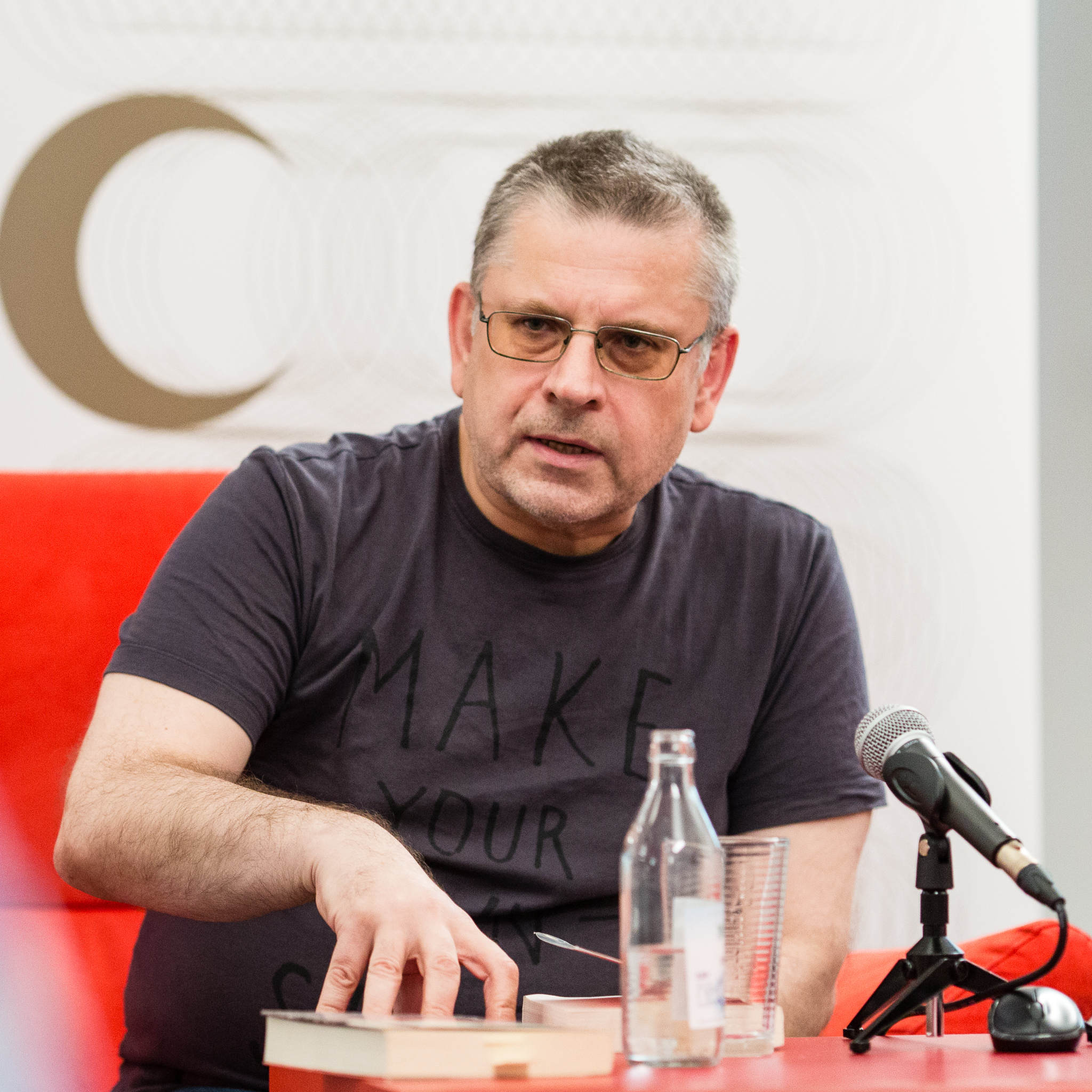
Jacek Inglot, 2018

Jacek Inglot (born 5 June 1962 in Siedlec) is a Polish science-fiction writer. His novels Inquisitor (1996) and Quietus (1997) were nominated for the Janusz A. Zajdel Award.

== Works ==
- Inquisitor, Dom Wydawniczy REBIS, Poznań 1996 (2. wyd.: Inquisitor. Zemsta Azteków, SuperNOWA, Warszawa 2006).
- Quietus, Zysk i S-ka, Poznań 1997.
- Bohaterowie do wynajęcia (with Andrzej Drzewiński), Fabryka Słów, Lublin 2004.
- Porwanie Sabinek, Wydawnictwo Otwarte, Kraków 2008.
- Eri i smok, Wydawnictwo Skrzat, Kraków 2009.
