= Nest of Worlds =

1998 novel by Marek S. Huberath

Nest of Worlds (Polish: Gniazdo światów) is a 1998 science fiction novel by the Polish author Marek S. Huberath. The novel has layers of nested stories, each of which is printed in a different font. This, along with its theme of books and reading, places it in the genre of metafiction. It was translated into English by Michael Kandel in 2014.

== Setting ==
Nest of Worlds is set in a universe which resembles the real world, but with different physical laws and social organisation.

=== Physics ===
In the main story, the flow of time depends on the distance of a given person or object from the planet. The further a body is from the surface, the slower time flows for that body. For example, at the beginning of the novel, two of the main characters, Dave and Magda, make a journey covering the same distance. Dave travels by plane, while Magda travels by ship. As a result, Dave's journey takes thirty-six hours, while Magda's takes four years, although they start and finish their respective journeys at roughly the same time. The physics varies further in the embedded stories.

=== Society ===
The planet in the main story is divided into four countries. At the age of thirty-five, every individual must leave their native country and move to the next. After another thirty-five years they move again, and so on: if they live long enough, they may return to their home country. The reason behind these removals is not explained but none of the characters seems to question their purpose.

Each country's society is organised according to racial criteria and divided into four castes according to hair colour. The hierarchy of castes is different in each country, so with each move, an individual's social position changes.

Apart from a given name and surname, everyone also has a Significant Name, which, with inexplicable yet inevitable certainty, determines the cause of its owner's death. The Significant Name is chosen by the child's parents and there are twelve alternatives. Sulled, for example, means 'from oneself', Aeriel means 'from air', Myzzt means 'through brain'.

=== Nested worlds ===
The qualities of the universe of each embedded story remain in a relationship with the qualities of all other "nested worlds", which can be expressed by means of mathematical formulae. For example, in each successive world, the number of countries increases, while the time an individual spends there decreases.

== Plot ==
The main character, Gavein Throzz (a.k.a. Dave) and his wife, Ra Mahleiné (Magda), arrive in the country of Davabel, after an obligatory migration from their native country. As soon as they settle in, a series of mysterious deaths in occurs in their neighbourhood. The mystery, is not the manner of death (for they are always perfectly explicable), but the reason their number and why the victims have always met Gavein. The idea that Gavein is responsible for the "epidemic of deaths" starts as a vague suspicion, but becomes widespread. Meanwhile, Dave's colleague, Wilcox, reads Nest of Worlds, a book that will later drive him to insanity and suicide. Throzz is taken to the Division of Science, where physicians unsuccessfully attempt to kill him. During Dave's stay at the Institute, his friend, Zef, also starts reading Nest of Worlds but, unlike Wilcox, is influenced positively by the book. Dave escapes from the hospital, which is being destroyed by earthquakes accompanying the formation of a volcano.

He comes home to find most of the household murdered (including Zef). After an unsuccessful attempt on his life—this time by the army—Dave starts reading Nest of Worlds as a form of escapism. The book tells about a world similar to his but with slightly changed qualities. The characters, like Gavein, read a book called Nest of Worlds. In their book the world is still different and the characters also read Nest of Worlds—and so on and so forth. It is characteristic that what happens in a "nested world" largely depends on the readers from a higher level. If they read the book, the characters’ lives speed up; if they stop reading it, the action slows down; if they reread any passage, it is never the same. Dave also reads notes that Zef had placed inside the book on slips of paper. Zef had been comparing the qualities of all the nested worlds and arranging them in mathematical formulae. These formulae show that the nested worlds constitute a logical continuum, suggesting that Gavein's world is also part of it, i.e. that Gavein is a character in a book. By "juggling numbers" Zef also infers the existence of our world and of the ultimate world, encompassing all other nested worlds, whose sole inhabitant is implicitly God.

The protagonist concludes that the mysterious deaths occurred because somebody had been reading the book in which he is the main character. Therefore, when his wife is also dying, Gavein addresses that reader and asks him or her to stop reading the book, so that his and his wife's lives can be suspended. Unless the reader fulfils Dave's wish, they learn from the Epilogue, that, after his wife's death, Throzz will commit suicide to finish the "epidemic of deaths". He also reasons that if all worlds are books, then somewhere there must be a gigantic Library with a Catalogue, where all characters from all Nest of Worlds books can finally meet. In the end, it is suggested that Gavein finds his way to that place. Marek Oramus, in a review, argues that the hero does not reach the Catalogue but "ends up [...] in hell, degraded by three levels" to one of the embedded worlds. However, whatever the place in which Gavein finds himself after his suicide, it seems highly unlike any kind of hell as his surroundings in the final scene are all more beautiful than before.

== See also ==
- Science fiction and fantasy in Poland
- List of metafictional works
