= Konrad T. Lewandowski =

Polish fiction writer (born 1966)

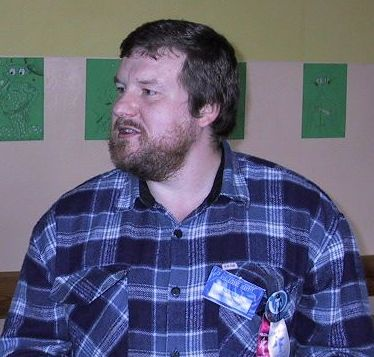
Lewandowski at Polcon 2001

Konrad Tomasz Lewandowski (a.k.a. Przewodas; born 1 April 1966 in Warsaw) is a fantasy and science fiction writer, journalist, and doctor of philosophy, best known for a science/political fiction series on the adventures of tabloid journalist Radosław Tomaszewski; and for a fantasy series about a werecat Ksin.

He has written several crime novels set in the Second Polish Republic, featuring Chief Inspector Jerzy Drwęcki.

In 1995 he received a Janusz A. Zajdel Award for his short story "Noteka 2015".

== Works ==
=== Translations into English ===
Lewandowski's story "Noteka 2015", translated into English by Brunon Stefanski and Krzysztof Bartnicki, appeared under the same title in the 2000 Chosen by Fate: Zajdel Award Winners Anthology.

== See also ==
- Science fiction and fantasy in Poland
