= Błażejewko =

- Village
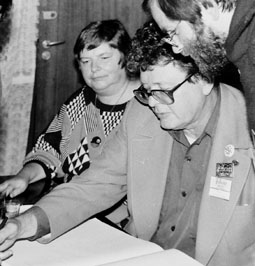
- Poul Anderson in Błażejewko, 1985

- Location within Poland
- Coordinates: 52°12′N 17°7′E
- Country: Poland
- Voivodeship: Greater Poland
- County: Poznań
- Gmina: Kórnik
- Elevation: 70 m (230 ft)
- Population: 169

Błażejewko [bwaʐɛˈjɛfkɔ] (German: Weißensee) is a village in the administrative district of Gmina Kórnik, within Poznań County, Greater Poland Voivodeship, in west-central Poland.
