= Marek Huberath =

Polish physicist and writer

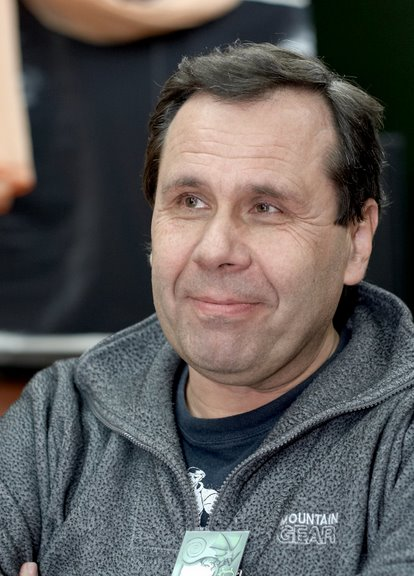
Marek S. Huberath

Marek S. Huberath (pen name, born 1954) is a Polish professor of physics in the Jagiellonian University in Kraków and an award-winning science fiction and fantasy writer. His themes are philosophical, moral, and religious: how people become beasts or remain human in extreme circumstances. Many of his stories focus on death. Winner of the Zajdel Award in 1991 for a short story Kara większa and in 1997 for his novel Gniazdo Światów.

== Works ==
=== Novels ===
- Gniazdo światów (Nest of Worlds) (NOWA 2000) (English translation by Michael Kandel, Restless Books 2014)
- Miasta pod skałą (Cities under the Rock) (Wydawnictwo Literackie 2005)
- Vatran Auraio (Wydawnictwo Literackie 2010)
- Zachodni portal Katedry w Lugdunum (Western Portal of the Cathedral in Lugdunum) (Wydawnictwo Literackie 2012)

=== Short story collections ===
- Ostatni, którzy wyszli z raju (The Last to Leave Paradise) (Zysk i S-ka 1996)
- Druga podobizna w alabastrze (Second Image in Alabaster) (Zysk i S-ka 1997)
- Balsam długiego pożegnania (Balm of Long Farewell) (Wydawnictwo Literackie 2006)

=== Short stories ===
- "Wrocieeś Sneogg, wiedziaam..." translated by Michael Kandel as "Yoo Retoont, Sneogg. Ay Noo" on Words without Borders; reprinted in A Polish Book of Monsters (New York: PIASA Books, 2010)
- "Balsam długiego pożegnania" translated as "Balm of a Long Farewell" by Michael Kandel on Words without Borders
- "Kocia obecność" translated as “A Cat’s Presence” translated by Magdalena Jarczyk in the Chosen by Fate: Zajdel Award Winners Anthology (2000).
- ”Kara większa” translated as “The Greater Punishment” by Wiesiek Powaga in The Dedalus Book of Polish Fantasy (1996).
