= Wiesław Bielak =

Wiesław Bielak (March 25 1943 – April 19, 2022) was Polish sculptor, professor.

During 1963–1969 he studied at the Academy of Fine Arts in Kraków, faculty of sculpture and for many years he worked there, running the stone sculpture workshop. He practiced medals, small sculptural forms and monumental sculptures.

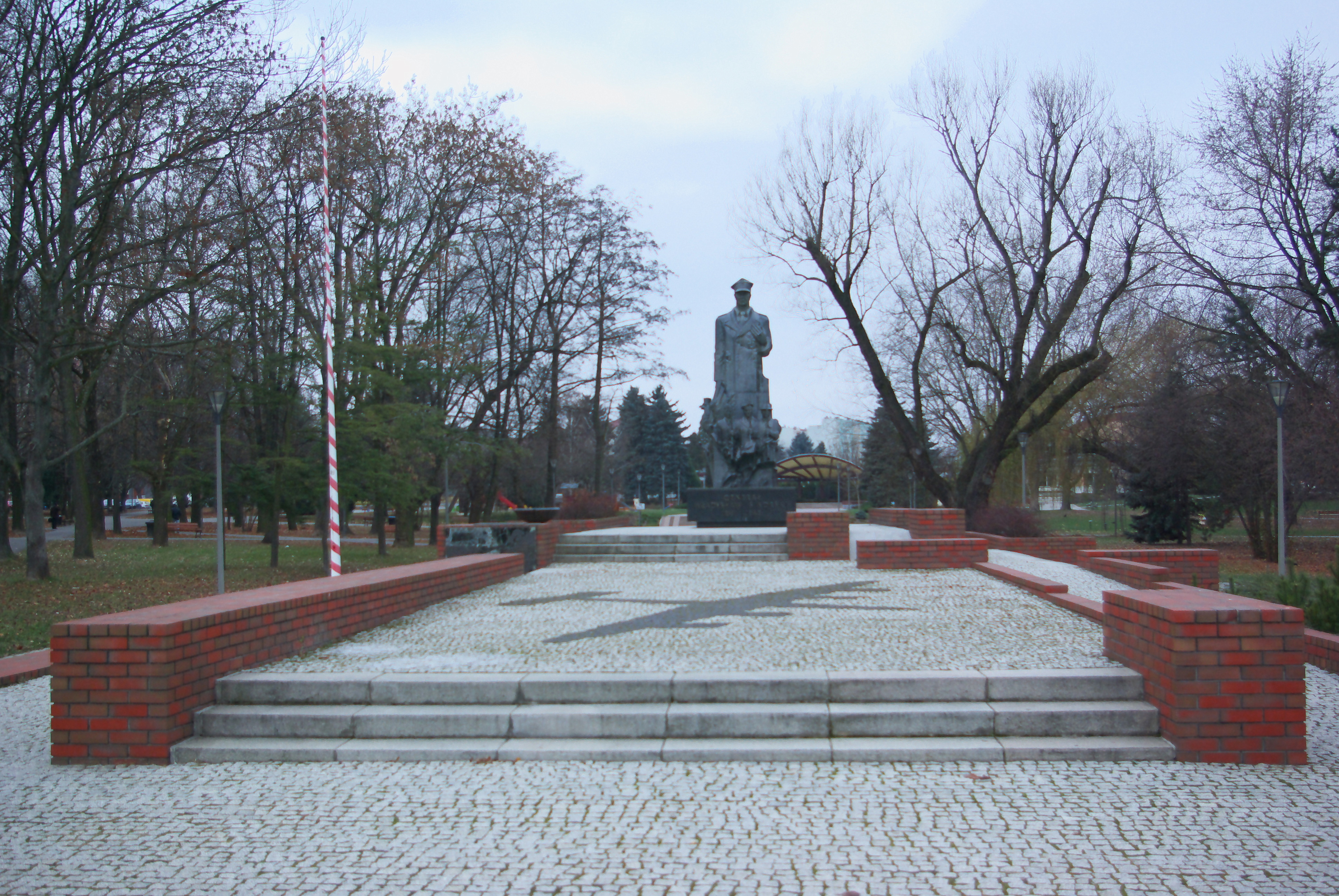
Monument to Władysław Sikorski

== Awards ==
He received a number of awards and distinctions at various sculpture competitions. In addition, his awards and decorations include:

- 2007: Gold Cross of Merit
- 2009: Honoris Gratia Medal from President of Krakow
- 2011: Medal of the Commission of National Education
- 2013: Knight's Cross of the Order of Polonia Restituta
