= Janusz A. Zajdel Award =

Polish science fiction and fantasy award

- The statuette of the Janusz A. Zajdel Award.
- Country: Poland
- Presented by: the Polish science fiction and fantasy fandom
- First award: 1984
- Website: zajdel.art.pl

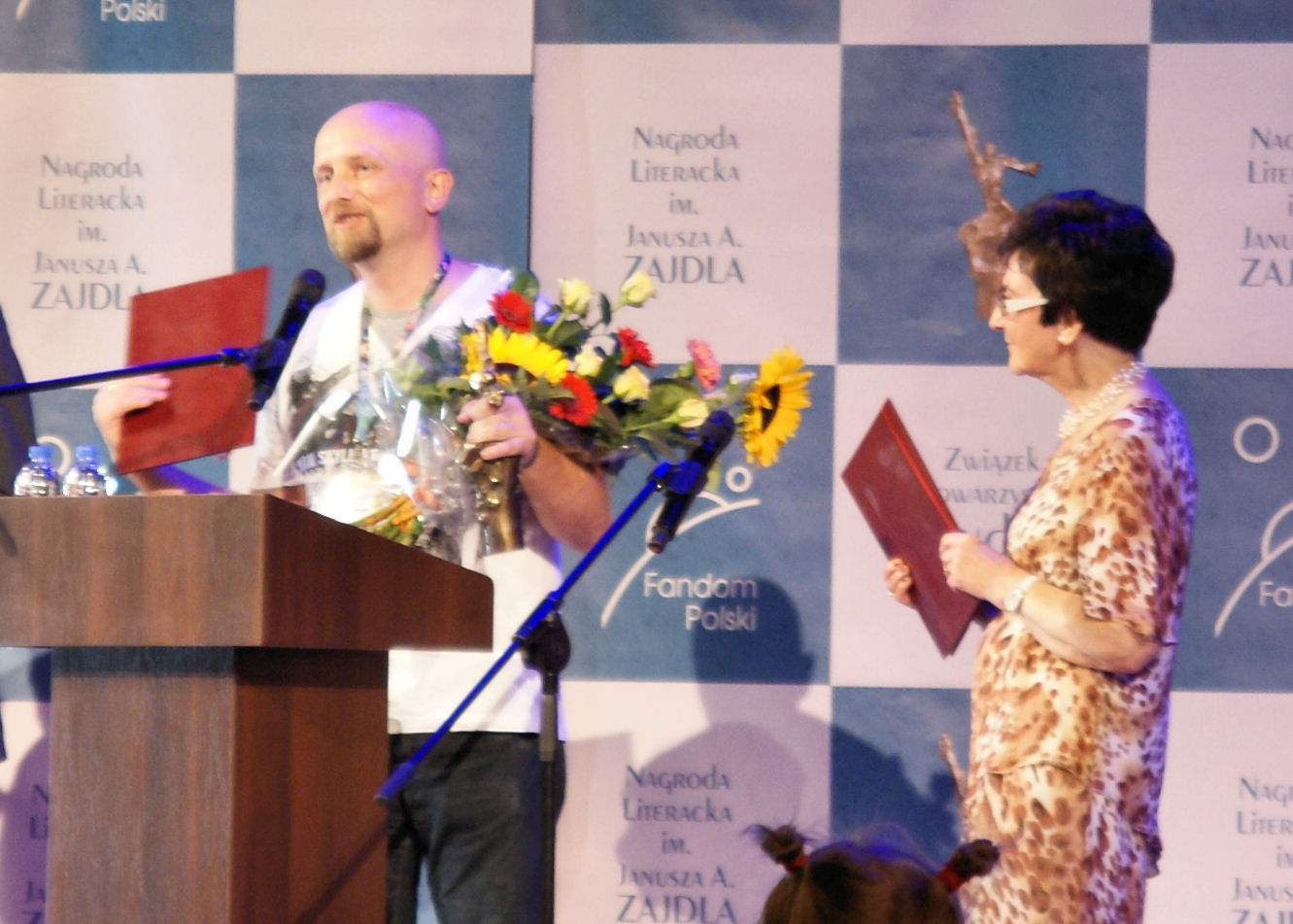
2013 winner: Rober Wegner

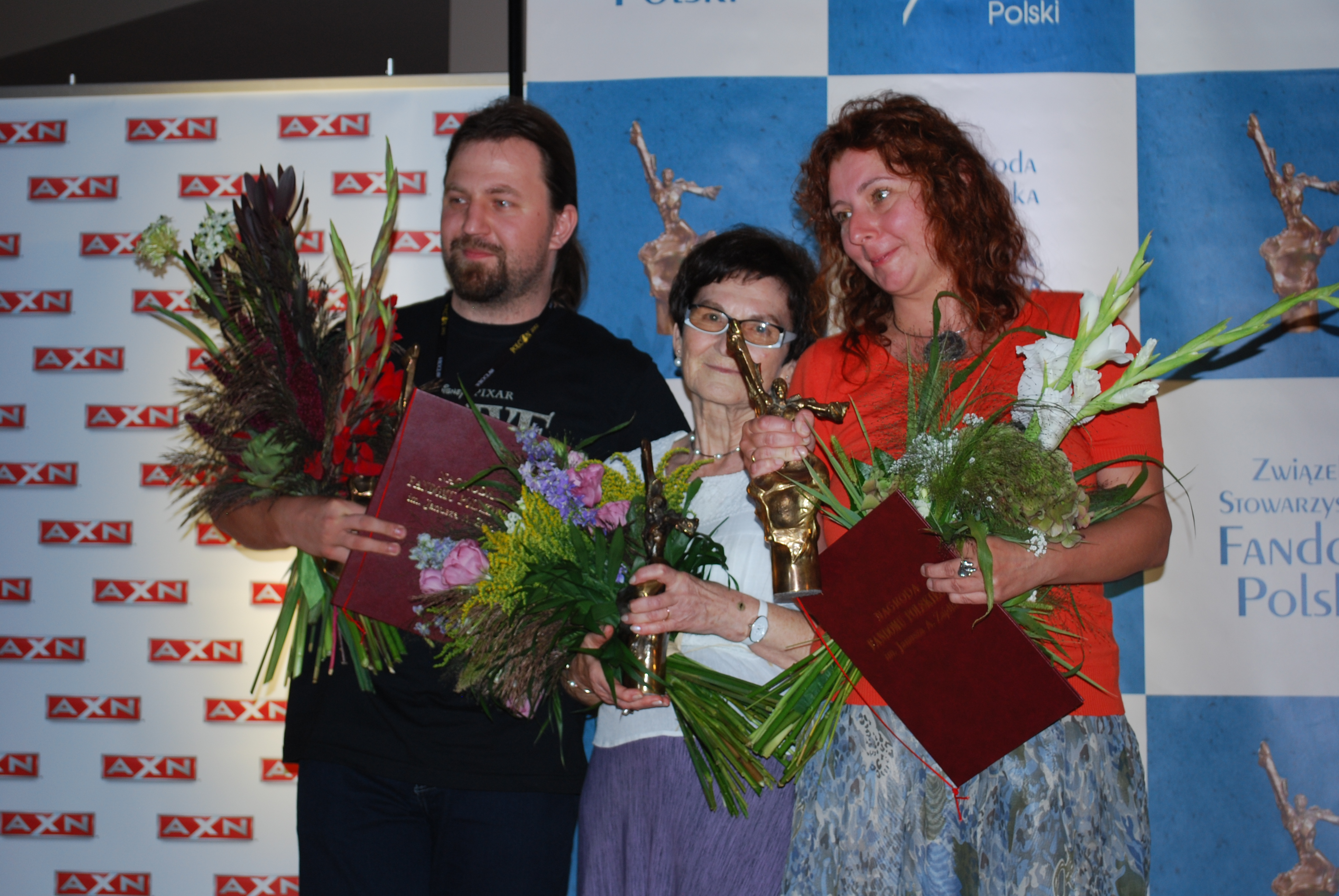
2012 winners: Jakub Ćwiek and Maja Lidia Kossakowska

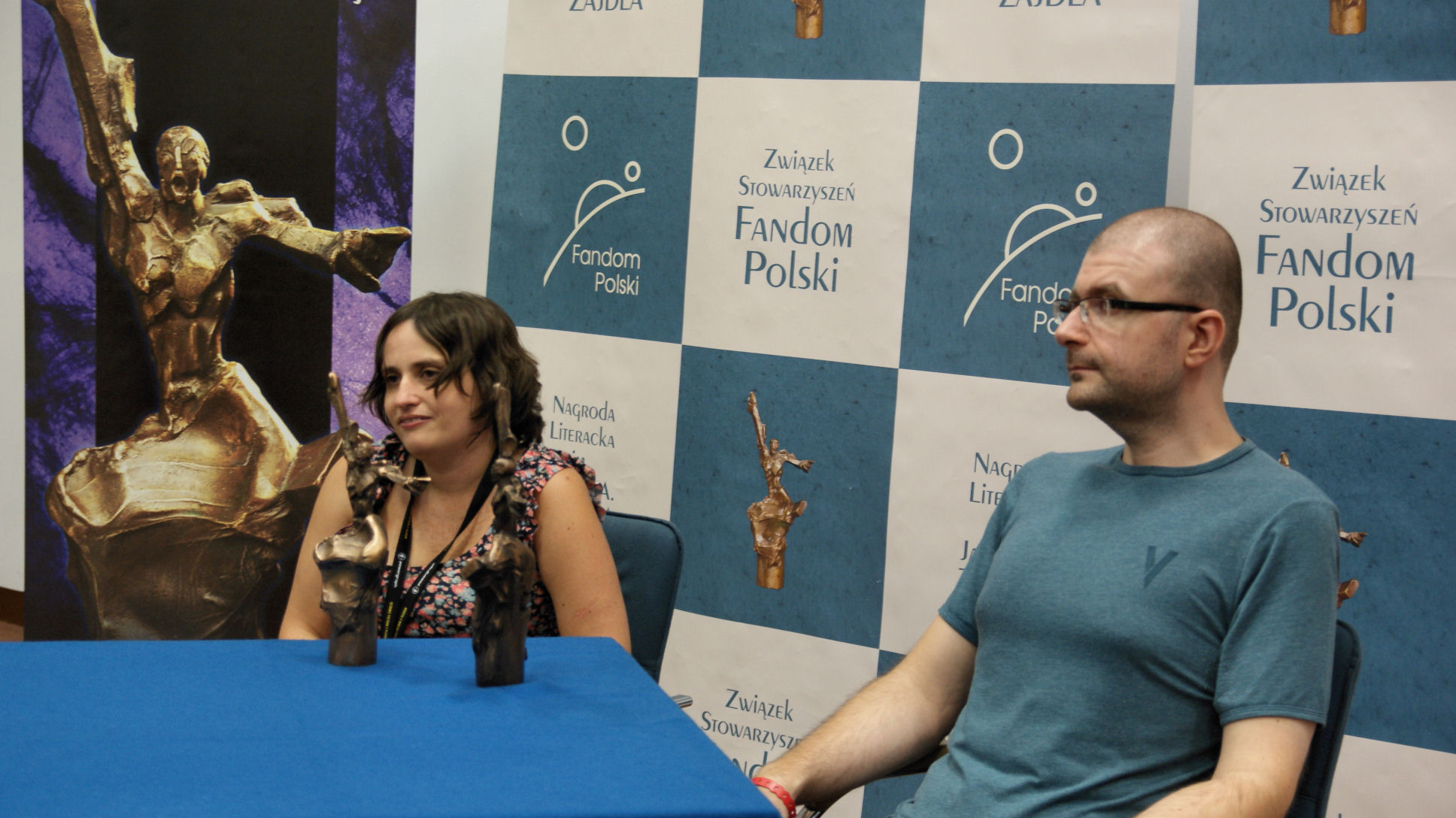
2011 winners: Jacek Dukaj and Anna Kańtoch

The Janusz A. Zajdel Award (Nagroda imienia Janusza A. Zajdla), often called just Zajdel, is the annual award given by the Polish science fiction and fantasy fandom for the best stories published in the previous year. It was established in 1984.

It is the most prestigious of several Polish awards for that genre of literature.

== Categories ==
The winners are chosen in a vote by fans present at the annual Polcon convention from up to five nominations in each of two categories:

- Novel: works longer than approximately 30,000 words
- Short story: shorter works.

Instant-runoff voting with "No award" as one of the choices is the method used. Vote counts are not announced.

== History ==
Previously the Polish Union of Fans of Science Fiction (Polskie Stowarzyszenie Miłośników Fantastyki) issued the Golden Sepulka Award for works of science fiction (1983-1986).

The Zajdel award was created in 1984 (to be awarded from 1985) under the name Sfinks (not to be confused with the Sfinks Award, an award of the SFinks magazine). After the death of the first winner, Janusz A. Zajdel, in 1985, the name was changed in his memory. Zajdel's widow, Jadwiga Zajdel, has presented the award to the winners since then.

Until 1989, the award was given by Polish science fiction fan associations, voting as units; since 1990, all fans present at Polcon convention can vote. Since 1991 the system has been based on two-tier ballot, compared to the system used in the Hugo Award.

Until 1991, there was a single award given for the best story; since 1992, there are two categories: novel and short story.

The statuette given to the winners since 1991 was designed by sculptor Wiesław Bielak, professor at the Jan Matejko Academy of Fine Arts.

In 2000, several stories by Zajdel winners were translated to English in the Anthology: Chosen by Fate: Zajdel Award Winners. That volume contained the translations of Ewa Białołęcka's "Jestem Lamia", Anna Brzezińska's "A kochał ją, że strach" ('98 winner), Marek S. Huberath's "Kocia obecność", Tomasz Kołodziejczak's Kolory sztandarów (excerpts from the novel; '96 winner), Feliks W. Kres's "Korona Shergardów", Andrzej Sapkowski's "Wiedźmin" and Rafał A. Ziemkiewicz's "Dobra wróżka".

In 2014, a free online e-book of the stories nominated for year 2013 was made available.

== Winners ==
The year given is the year of publication. Since 1992, novels and short stories have been judged separately. The winners of the award are:

Year	Novel	Short story
1984	Janusz Andrzej Zajdel, Paradyzja	
1985	Marek Baraniecki, Głowa Kasandry	
1986	no award	
1987	no award	
1988	Edmund Wnuk-Lipiński, Rozpad połowiczny	
1989	no award	
1990		Andrzej Sapkowski, Mniejsze zło
1991		Marek S. Huberath, Kara większa
1992	Feliks Wiktor Kres, Król Bezmiarów	Andrzej Sapkowski, Miecz przeznaczenia
1993	no award	Andrzej Sapkowski, W leju po bombie
1994	Andrzej Sapkowski, Krew elfów	Ewa Białołęcka, Tkacz Iluzji
1995	Rafał A. Ziemkiewicz, Pieprzony los kataryniarza	Konrad Tomasz Lewandowski, Noteka 2015
1996	Tomasz Kołodziejczak, Kolory sztandarów	Rafał A. Ziemkiewicz, Śpiąca królewna
1997	Marek S. Huberath, Druga podobizna w alabastrze	Ewa Białołęcka, Błękit Maga
1998	Rafał A. Ziemkiewicz, Walc stulecia	Anna Brzezińska, A kochał ją, że strach
1999	Marek S. Huberath, Gniazdo światów	Antonina Liedtke, CyberJoly Drim
2000	Anna Brzezińska, Żmijowa harfa	Jacek Dukaj, Katedra
2001	Jacek Dukaj, Czarne oceany	Andrzej Ziemiański, Autobahn nach Poznań
2002	Andrzej Sapkowski, Narrenturm	Andrzej Pilipiuk, Kuzynki
2003	Jacek Dukaj, Inne pieśni	Andrzej Ziemiański, Zapach szkła
2004	Jacek Dukaj, Perfekcyjna niedoskonałość	Anna Brzezińska, Wody głębokie jak niebo
2005	Jarosław Grzędowicz, Pan Lodowego Ogrodu, volume 1	Jarosław Grzędowicz, Wilcza zamieć
2006	Jarosław Grzędowicz, Popiół i kurz	Maja Lidia Kossakowska, Smok tańczy dla Chung Fonga
2007	Jacek Dukaj, Lód	Wit Szostak, Miasto grobów. Uwertura
2008	Rafał Kosik, Kameleon	Anna Kańtoch, Światy Dantego
2009	Anna Kańtoch, Przedksiężycowi, volume 1	Robert M. Wegner, Wszyscy jesteśmy Meekhańczykami
2010	Jacek Dukaj, Król Bólu i pasikonik	Anna Kańtoch, Duchy w maszynach
2011	Maja Lidia Kossakowska, Grillbar Galaktyka	Jakub Ćwiek, Bajka o trybach i powrotach
2012	Robert M. Wegner, Niebo ze stali	Robert M. Wegner, Jeszcze jeden bohater
2013	Krzysztof Piskorski, Cienioryt	Anna Kańtoch, Człowiek nieciągły
2014	Michał Cholewa, Forta	Anna Kańtoch, Sztuka porozumienia
2015	Robert M. Wegner, Pamięć wszystkich słów	Robert M. Wegner, Milczenie owcy
2016	Krzysztof Piskorski, Czterdzieści i cztery	Łukasz Orbitowski and Michał Cetnarowski, Wywiad z Borutą
2017	Rafał Kosik, Różaniec	Marta Kisiel, Szaławiła
2018	Robert Wegner, Każde martwe marzenie	Marta Kisiel, Pierwsze słowo
2019	Radek Rak, Baśń o wężowym sercu albo wtóre słowo o Jakóbie Szeli [A Tale of the Serpent's Heart or the Second Word about Jakub Szela]	Marta Potocka, "Chomik" ["Hamster"]
2020	Agnieszka Hałas, Czerń nie zapomina	Krzysztof Matkowski and Krzysztof Rewiuk, Święci z Vukovaru
2021	Magdalena Salik, Płomień	Michał Cholewa, Ucieczka
2022	Radek Rak, Agla. Alef	Michał Cholewa, Na granicy
2023	Istvan Vizvary, Lagrange. Listy z Ziemi	Agnieszka Hałas, Świerszcze w soli
2024	Andrzej Sapkowski, Crossroads of Ravens	Aleksandra Janusz, Dlaczego nie ma klanu kruka

== Winner summaries ==
=== 2019: Radek Rak, Baśń o wężowym sercu... ===
The novel is loosely based on the legends about Jakub Szela, the leader of a 1846 peasant uprising known as the Galician slaughter. It gained several other literary awards.

=== 2019: Marta Potocka, "Chomik" ===
Marta Potocka is a young writer, with several short stories. She works as a programmer. Her winning work "Chomik" ["Hamster"] was published in the e-zine Esensja, no. 5, 2019. The story is set in the near future Poland. The heavily criticized Social Insurance Institution is closed and the basic social security payment is introduced to everybody subject to the condition that to qualify for it the person must join the program of Social Monitoring. The Social Insurance Institution is replaced with the Social Balance Institution, whose function is to control that people spend as much money as possible. Those who do not want to spend are called "hamsters", i.e., "hoarders". An employee of SII tries to handle a particularly tough "hamster" and fails, but instead uncovers a much larger problem. Chomik is available online.
