= Fahrenheit (fanzine) =

Online Polish science-fiction magazine, started in 1997

Fahrenheit is the oldest Polish literary e-zine which publishes literary works and literary criticism on science fiction, fantasy and horror fiction. It was established in 1997 by "Gin and Tonic", i.e., Polish authors Andrzej Ziemiański (alias Gin) and Eugeniusz Dębski (alias Tonik).

== History ==
During 1997–2001 Fahrenheit published 21 issues. In 2001 Fahrenheit merged with Fantazin to form a literary portal "Fahrenheit & Fantazin" ("F&F"). In 2002 it turned out that this form didn't work well, and it returned to the form of monthly magazine, under the name Fahrenheit. It was joined by Srebrny Glob. In 2012 the magazine returned to the portal format.

== Activities ==
The magazine has been taking part in the initiatives in mainstream publishing, which, in part, resulted in "Anthologies of Fahrenheit": Kochali się, że strach (2007, ISBN 8360505837, 13 works) and Nawiedziny (2009, ISBN 9788375740905, 13 works), which included works of new authors.

Małgorzata Koczańska in the introduction to Nawiedziny wrote that Dominika Repeczko organized a "nonstop literary competition for new authors and nonstop training grounds for editors of Fahrenhieit", which resulted in Kochali się, że strach and Nawiedziny, and some others were underway. These activities served the promotion of the fanzine as well.

A number of Polish writers and translators published their debut works in Fahrenheit.

Besides literary works (of both new and established authors), the fanzine publishes reviews, essays and interviews, and in general is recognized for its professionalism in various respects (long life, regularity, high level of texts, as well as artistism of its graphics).

== Chief editors ==
- Andrzej Ziemiański (1997–2001)
- Eugeniusz Dębski (2002–2004)
- Tomasz Pacyński (2004–2005)
- Dominika Repeczko (2005–2012)
- Dorota Pacyńska (2012–2019)
- Maciej Tomczak (since 2019)
