= Jerzy Żuławski Literary Award =

Jerzy Żuławski Literary Award (Polish: Nagroda Literacka im. Jerzego Żuławskiego) is the annual award given by the Polish Writers Association to the best Polish speculative fiction published in the previous year. It is named after an early writer of science fiction in Poland, Jerzy Żuławski.

Unlike in the older Janusz A. Zajdel Award, where the winners are voted by the public, the Żuławski Award is awarded by scholars and critics in the literary field.

The award was established in 2008 by Polish science fiction writer, Andrzej Zimniak.
