= Polcon =

Speculative fiction convention in Poland

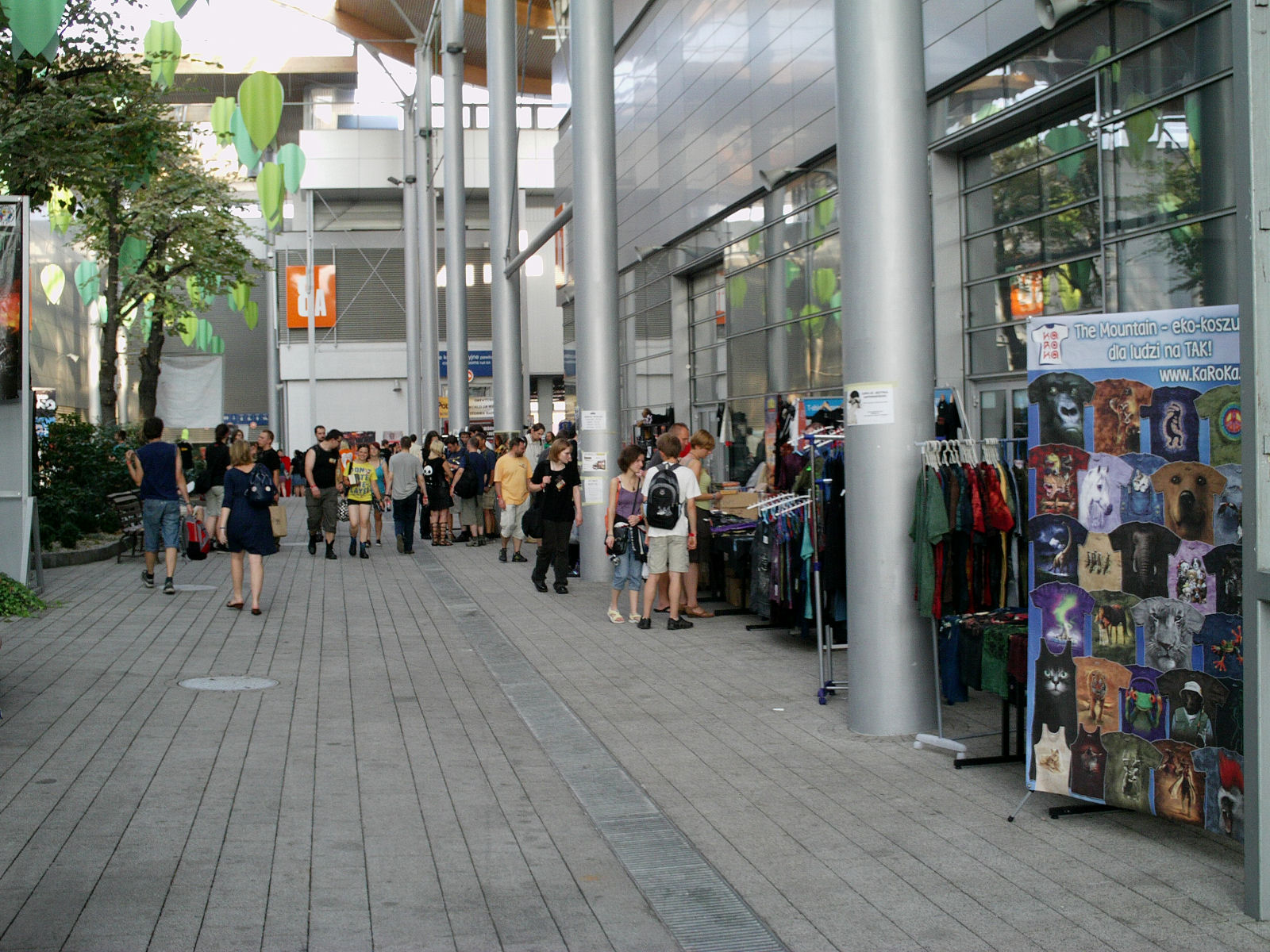
- Polcon 2011
- Status: Active
- Genre: science fiction
- Country: Poland
- Inaugurated: 1985
- Website: http://www.polcon.fandom.art.pl

Polcon 2011 in Poznań

Polcon is the oldest Polish speculative fiction convention, organized each year in a different place by the local speculative fiction club. The Janusz A. Zajdel Award is awarded during the convention. The first Polcon was held in 1985 in Błażejewko near Poznań.

== List of Polcons ==
Polcon's location is chosen two years in advance during the convention itself; for example, the location of 2016 Polcon (Wrocław) was chosen during Polcon 2014 (Bielsko-Biała).

2025 - Warsaw (Bazyliszek)
2024 - Toruń (Copernicon)
2023 - Łódź
2022 - Kraków
2021 - Zielona Góra
2020 - was not held
2019 - Białystok
2018 - Toruń
2017 - Lublin
2016 - Wrocław
2015 - Poznań
2014 - Bielsko-Biała
2013 - Warsaw
2012 - Wrocław
2011 - Poznań
2010 - Cieszyn and Český Těšín, with Eurocon and Parcon
2009 - Łódź
2008 - Zielona Góra
2007 - Warsaw
2006 - Lublin
2005 - Błażejewko near Poznań
2004 - Zielona Góra
2003 - Elbląg
2002 - Kraków
2001 - Katowice
2000 - Gdynia
1999 - Warsaw
1998 - Białystok
1997 - Katowice
1996 - was not held
1995 - Jastrzębia Góra
1994 - Lublin
1993 - Waplewo
1992 - Białystok
1991 - Kraków
1990 - Waplewo
1989 - Gdańsk
1988 - Katowice
1987 - Warsaw
1986 - Katowice
1985 - Błażejewko near Poznań
