= Fenix (magazine) =

Polish sci-fi magazine (1990–2001, 2018–)

Fenix

Fenix was a Polish fantastika magazine published from 1990 to 2001. It was the first privately owned magazine in the country. It was created by Jarosław Grzędowicz, Krzysztof Sokołowski, Rafał A. Ziemkiewicz, Andrzej Łaski and Dariusz Zientalak jr..

The magazine was reactivated in literary and critical anthology form in 2018 by Bartek Biedrzycki (Polish s-f and comic writer and publisher) and Sokołowski under the name Fenix Antologia with official approval from Grzędowicz.

== About ==
Fenix was created as a continuation of Feniks fanzine, which ran for 8 issues winning the European SF Awards in 1987 for best zine. The magazine was published at first by Radwan, then since 1991 by Prószyński i Spółka, and from 2000 to 2001 by Wydawnictwo Mag, after which date the publication was suspended until 2018. From the beginning to 1993 Rafał A. Ziemkiewicz was the editor in chief, later on replaced by Jarosław Grzędowicz. The 2018 Fenix Antologia run was edited by Bartek Biedrzycki and lasted to 2020.

The magazine was visually distinct due to its small,"pocket" size, also recalled as easy to carry in the side pockets of military trousers. Together with the Fantastyka magazine, Fenix is said to have created and shaped a whole generation of Polish s-f and fantasy writers in Poland in the 90's as well as introducing some of the great names from the western SF&F literature.

== See also ==
- Science fiction magazine
- Fantasy fiction magazine
- Horror fiction magazine
