= Nowa Fantastyka =

Polish science fiction and fantasy magazine

Nowa Fantastyka (established as Fantastyka in 1982, renamed in 1990) is a Polish speculative fiction monthly fantasy and science fiction magazine. It is the leading and oldest of the Polish magazines on this topic.

== History ==
Fantastyka was established in 1982 by sci-fi fans Andrzej Krzepkowski, Jacek Rodek and Andrzej Wójcik, under the direction of the writer and journalist Adam Hollanek, who became the magazine's first editor-in-chief. It became known as one of few magazines to publish both foreign and Polish short stories, as well as full-length novels in instalments. Between 1990 and 1992 its editor-in-chief was Lech Jęczmyk, followed by Maciej Parowski and Arkadiusz Nakoniecznik. In March 2006 Paweł Matuszek took over.

Andrzej Sapkowski published his first short story about The Witcher in the magazine - a debut that led to the publishing success of The Witcher saga.

Today Fantastyka is dedicated predominantly to short stories, but also to articles on modern science, film and book reviews and comic pages. In addition, it brings fandom and convention news.

Apart from Nowa Fantastyka, there have been several periodical variations of the title:

- Mała Fantastyka (1987–1989) - an sf/fantasy quarterly for children
- Komiks-Fantastyka (1980s-1991) - comic books, in 1991 changed the name to Komiks
- Nowa Fantastyka - Wydanie specjalne (since 2003) - a quarterly with longer stories and novels
- Czas Fantastyki - (2004-2015) - a bimonthly with literary criticism, essays and prose

Fantastyka featured stories by Philip K. Dick, J. R. R. Tolkien, Anthony Burgess, Orson Scott Card, Kir Bulychov, and many other acclaimed writers. It was there that most of modern Polish sf/fantasy writers made their debut. Among them are Jacek Dukaj, Andrzej Sapkowski, Rafał A. Ziemkiewicz and Konrad T. Lewandowski. Finally, on the middle pages that used to be devoted to art, Fantastyka featured many renowned artists, including Enki Bilal, Wojciech Siudmak, Zdzisław Beksiński, Jacek Yerka and Jerzy Skarżyński. The comic series Lil & Put (by Maciej Kur and Piotr Bednarczyk) are currently published in the magazine, with satirical take on fantasy adventures.

== See also ==
- Fenix, another Polish SF magazine
