= Pyrkon =

Annual fan convention

Coordinates: 52.403091°N 16.904045°E

Multigenre Fan Convention Pyrkon
- Status: Active
- Genre: Speculative fiction
- Venue: Poznań International Fair
- Location: Poznań
- Country: Poland
- Inaugurated: 1999
- Attendance: over 55,000
- Organizer: SF Club "Second Age"
- Filing status: Non-profit
- Website: www.pyrkon.pl

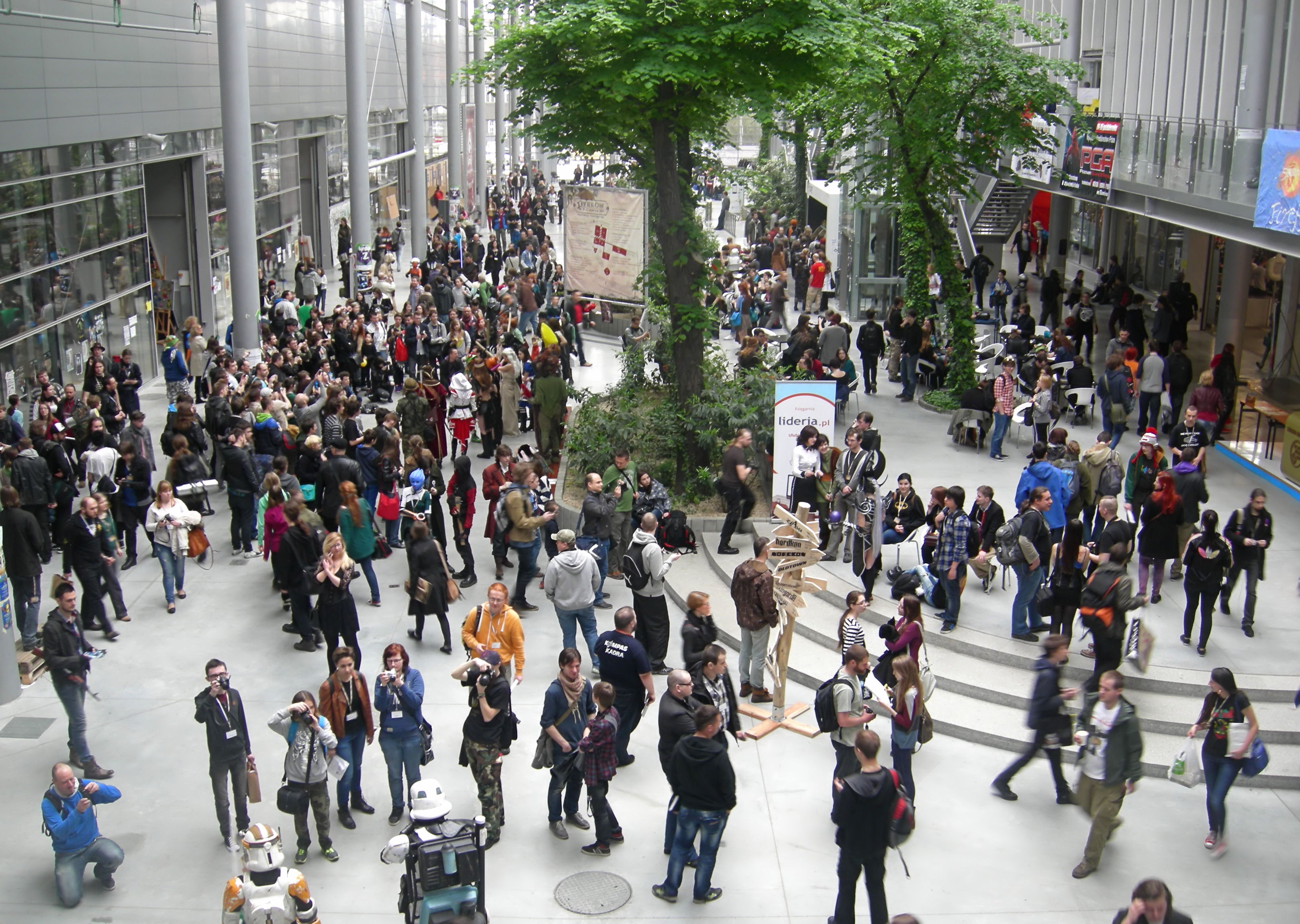
Pyrkon 2014

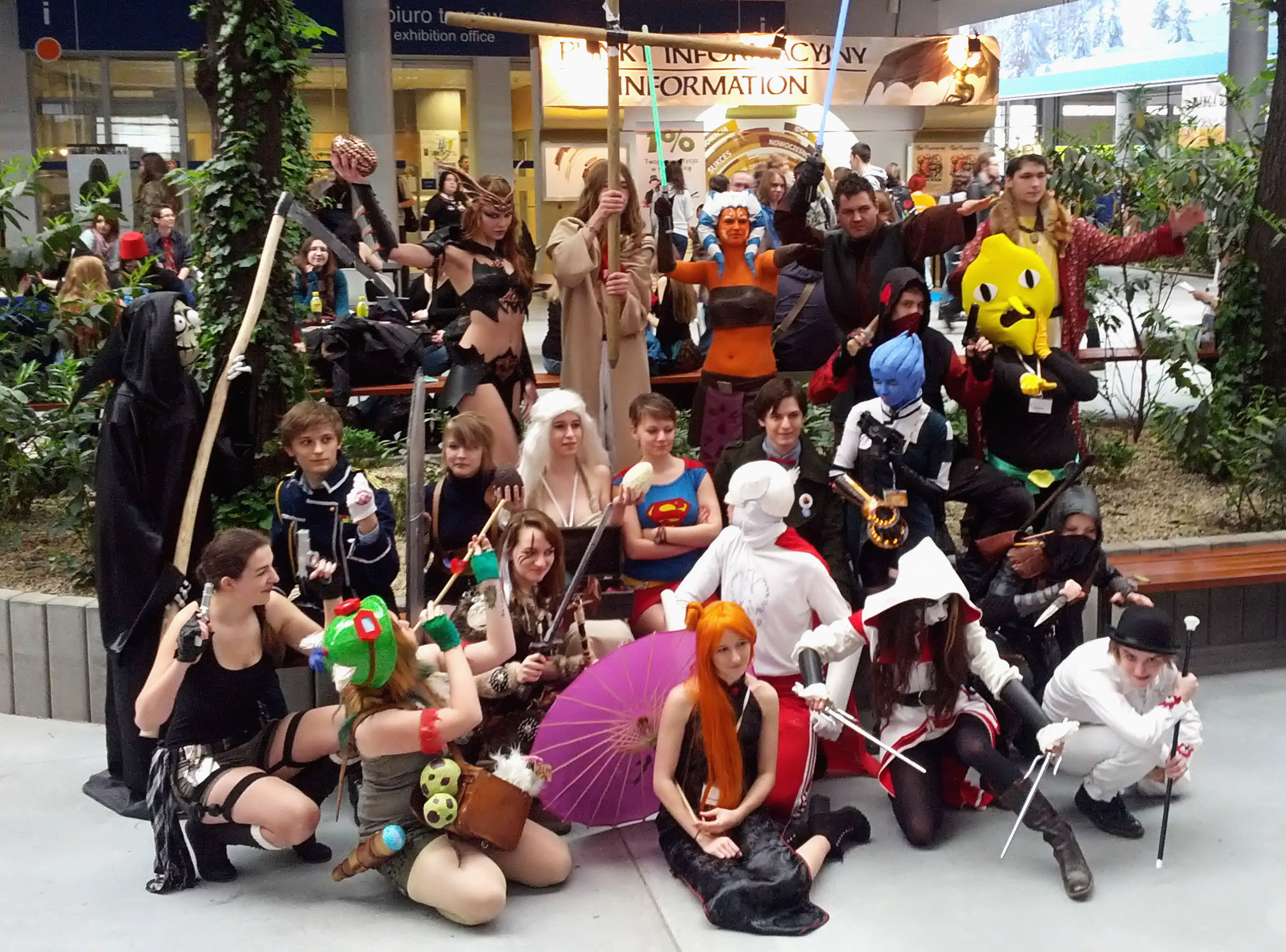
Cosplayers on Pyrkon 2014

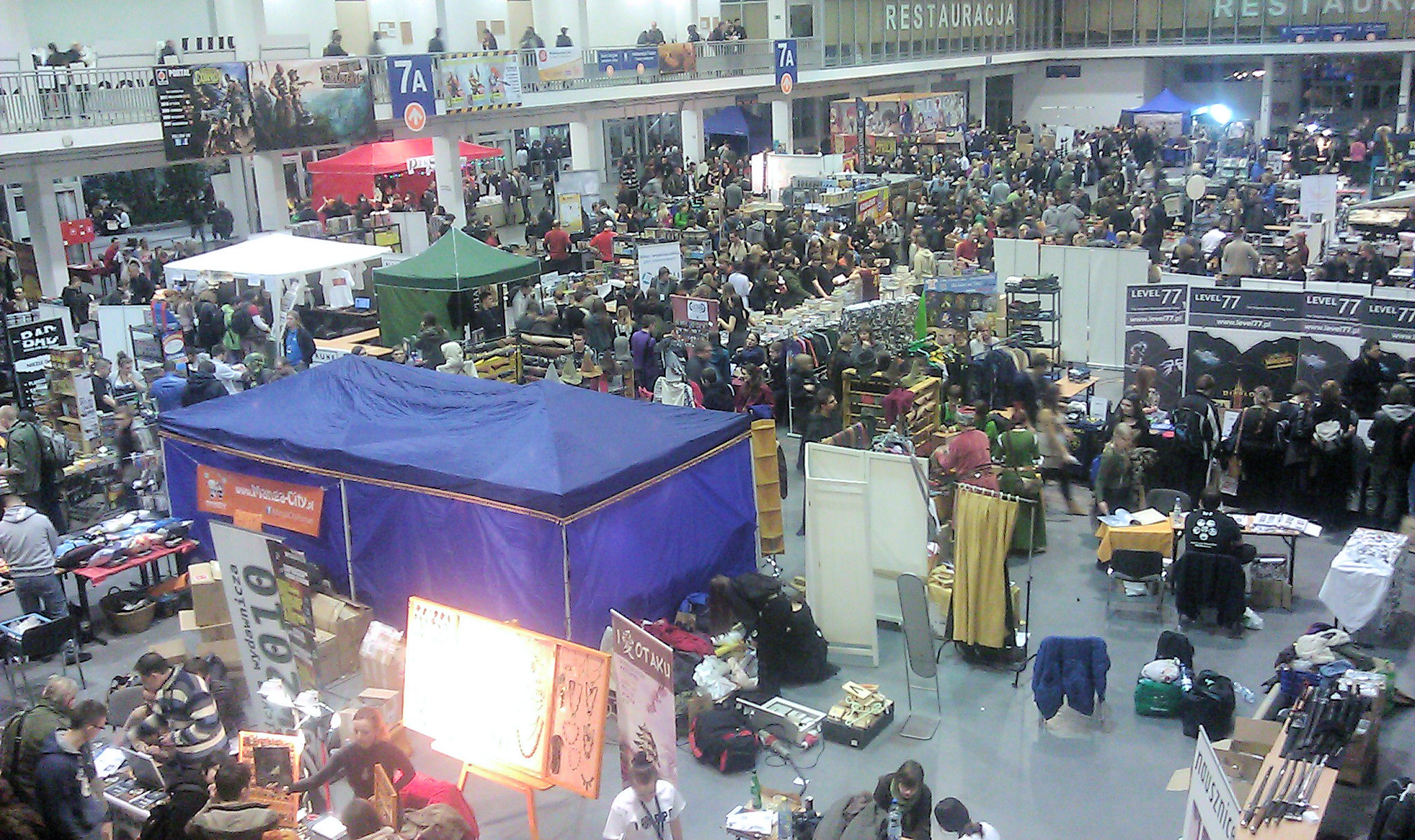
Pyrkon 2013

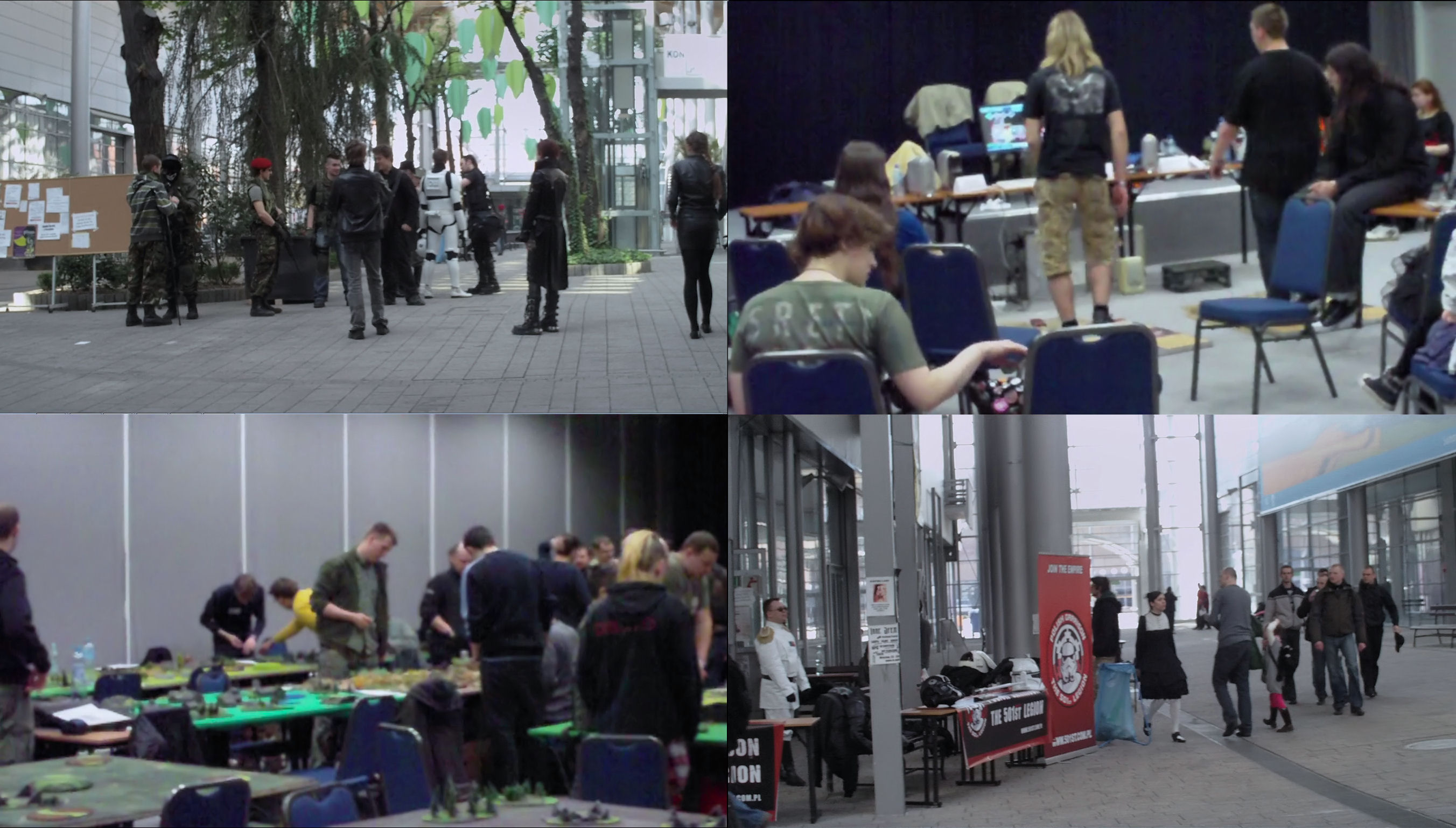
Pyrkon 2011

Multigenre Fan Convention Pyrkon (pol. Festiwal Fantastyki Pyrkon) (commonly known as Pyrkon) is a Polish fan convention held annually in Poznań in late June and dedicated to an integration of Science fiction fandom and a promotion of science-fiction/fantasy literature, comics, film, television, video games, RPG, LARP, board games, collectible card games and miniature wargaming. Pyrkon is the biggest event of this type in Poland and one of the biggest in Europe (over 55,000 people in 2022).

== History ==
Pyrkon has been held by the Second Age Science Fiction Club (Klub Fantastyki "Druga Era") every year since 2000, except 2005 when they held Polcon. (In 2011 they organised both Pyrkon and Polcon.) Pyrkon has been a non-profit convention from its beginning, and all organizers, lecturers and gofers are volunteers.

Pyrkon was initially held in the Dębiec district of Poznań. Due to the increasing number of visitors, in 2011 the convention moved to the present location, the Poznań International Fair and the Liceum ogólnokształcące nr 2 in Poznań (Liceum Ogólnokształcące nr 2 w Poznaniu).

On 6 March 1999, Second Age organised "Science Fiction Day" in the "Sun" District House of Culture in the Przyjaźni (Polish for friendship) district in Poznań. It was the direct predecessor of Pyrkon.

The tradition of holding Pyrkon on the first weekend after the spring equinox started in 2006. Usually it is also the weekend when Daylight saving time begins – participants are informed in a convention guide book and on posters of the need to adjust their timepieces.

== Etymology ==
The name "Pyrkon" is derived from pyra ("potato" in Poznań's dialect) and the suffix -kon, which is added to names of all Polish fan conventions and is derived from polish word for a convention- konwent. According to a longtime chairman of the Second Age Club Piotr Derkacz this was actually supposed to be a temporary name, until they would come up with a more serious one.

== Program ==
=== Main Attractions ===
Pyrkon's goals are realized in

- meetings and discussion panels with science fiction and fantasy authors
- meetings with books and games publishers
- thematic lectures related to all spheres of science fiction
- popular science lectures, especially about physics, history, linguistics and cultural studies
- RPG sessions and LARP-s
- lending board games (Games Room)
- lending old video games
- board games, collectible card games and miniature wargaming tournaments
- demonstrations and premieres of board games, collectible card games, miniature wargaming and video games
- thematic competitions with prizes
- cosplay contest with prizes - The Masquerade

=== Other Attractions ===
The following also take place on Pyrkon:

- concerts
- fighting shows
- fireshows
- dancing shows and lessons
- karaoke and DDR contests
- Pyrkon Dance

=== Program Sections ===
Attractions (lectures, discussion panels, meetings with guests, contests, concerts etc.) on Pyrkon are divided into thematic sections. Most attractions are held in Polish.

Pyrkon 2019 had 19 program sections, which are listed below:

- Integration Section – integration section is a zone to meet new friends and participate in integration games. There, you can strengthen ties with already known people, but also meet other participants with similar passions
- Film Section – lectures about films and film-making, amateur film shows, lessons of creating YouTube content
- Computer Games Section – computer games contests and tournaments, lectures about game design, creating Let's Play
- Literature Section – lectures and discussion panels about science-fiction and fantasy literature and meetings with authors
- Science Section – popular science lectures
- RPG Section – lessons on making good role-play sessions, presentations of new RPG systems, meetings with role-playing games creators
- LARP Section – LARP games, contest for best LARP on Pyrkon, presentations of LARP systems, lectures about making LARP costumes, improving larping skills
- Comics Section – lessons of comics drawing, meetings with comic book artists, lectures about comics
- Manga & Anime Section – lessons of manga style drawing, lectures about Japanese comics, animation and culture in general
- Contest Section – competitions about every part of pop culture
- Board Games Section – Games Room – presentations of new board games, games' rules lessons, lending board games
- Beginners' Section – short introductory lectures about every aspect of Fandom for beginners who have never visited any convention, played a board game, seen science-fiction film etc.
- Kids' Section – science-fiction and fantasy related attractions for children younger than 10 years old
- Exhibitions, Shows, Workshops – dance lessons and shows, concerts, Lego exhibitions etc.
- Fantasium Suburbium - The zone in which villages created by participants are related to the world of fantasy. There are, among others, handicraft workshops or fight and dance shows. From the groups exhibiting there, participants can hear a bit about reconstruction, as well as learn a bit of the armor creation, sewing or jewelry making
- Fantasium Creatium - A place where artists from all over the Poland exhibit their fantasy-related works. Both professional artists and beginners can submit their exhibitions. Inside the Fantasium Creatium there are, among others, science-fiction, fantasy, post-apocalyptic, handicraft and science zones
- Fantasium Ludicrum - The block, which includes stage performances - concerts and shows - and film screenings. The Fantasium Ludicrum performed, among others, Percival Schuttenbach, actors of the Poznań Musical Theater, there was also a performance of the "Ark" of the Theater of the Eighth Day
- Fantastic Initiatives Zone - The zone is intended for festival organizers and fantasy conventions from all over Poland. It serves as a place to meet, exchange experiences and make contacts with potential members of fantasy organizations. There are also smaller Polish fantasy events advertised there
- The Masquerade - One of the highlights of the program during Pyrkon is The Masquerade cosplay competition. Its participants compete in the categories: Best Cosplay, Best Own Project, Best Group Presentation and Best Solo Presentation. The main prize is the Grand Prix. In addition, the 2019 The Masquerade winner received the right to compete in the Cosplay Champions competition. The condition for joining The Masquerade is to create your own costume. It can depict a character known from the world of fantasy, but it must be made by hand. Each participant presents his disguise first only to the jury, which assesses whether the cosplay was really created from scratch. The Masquerade is traditionally held at the Earth Hall - the largest hall located at the Poznań International Fair. Due to the limited number of seats in the audience and the great interest of the audience, the show is also displayed on a large screen at the Fair, as well as broadcast live on Pyrkon's social media channels.

== Foreign guests ==
Year	Name and surname	Profession	Nationality	Residence
2008	Miroslav Žamboch	writer	Czech	Czech Republic
2009	Wojciech Siudmak	painter	Polish	France
2011	Adrian Tchaikovsky	writer	British	United Kingdom
2012	Shane Lacy Hensley	game designer	American	United States
2012	Ian McDonald	writer	British	United Kingdom
2012	Grzegorz Rosiński	comic book artist	Polish	Switzerland
2013	Eoin O'Doherty	programmer	Irish	United Kingdom
2013	Graham Masterton	writer	British	United Kingdom
2013	John Wick	RPG designer	American	United States
2013	Miroslav Žamboch	writer	Czech	Czech Republic
2014	Tad Williams	writer	American	United States
2014	Sandy Petersen	RPG designer	American	United States
2014	Cameron Stewart	comic book artist	Canadian	Germany
2014	Olga Gromyko	writer	Russian	Belarus
2014	Charles Stross	writer	British	United Kingdom
2014	Lauren Beukes	writer	South African	South Africa
2014	Umberto Pignatelli	RPG designer	Italian	Italy
2014	Guy Delisle	comic book artist	Canadian	Canada
2014	Tony Swatton	blacksmith	American	United States
2014	Sergey Legeza	writer	Ukrainian	Ukraine
2014	Vladimir Arenev	writer	Ukrainian	Ukraine
2015	Ted Chiang	writer	American	United States
2015	Dmitrij Głuchowski	writer	Russian	Russia
2015	Jasper Fforde	writer	British	United Kingdom
2015	Joe Haldeman	writer	American	United States
2015	John Kovalic	comic book artist	British	United States
2016	Mark Rein•Hagen	RPG designer	American	United States
2016	John Wick	RPG designer	American	United States
2016	Miroslav Žamboch	writer	Czech	Czech Republic
2016	David Weber	writer	American	United States
2016	John Layman	comic book artist	American	United States

== Time and place ==
Time	Place	Visitors	Official guests
6 March 1999	District House of Culture "Sun", "Friendship" district in Poznań	~400	Jacek Inglot, Robert Lipski, Marek Oramus, Romuald Pawlak, Andrzej Sapkowski, prof. Antoni Smuszkiewicz, Przemysław Truściński, Rafał A. Ziemkiewicz, Andrzej Zimniak
11–12 March 2000	Elementary School nr 21 in Poznań	~580	Eugeniusz Dębski, Marek S. Huberath, Jacek Inglot, Witold Jabłoński, Feliks W. Kres, Andrzej Pilipiuk, Andrzej Sapkowski, Jacek Sobota, Andrzej Zimniak
9–11 March 2001	Elementary School nr 21 in Poznań	~650	Eugeniusz Dębski, Mirosław Jabłoński, Lech Jęczmyk, Marek Oramus, Maciej Parowski, Andrzej Pilipiuk, Bogusław Polch, Jacek Sobota, Andrzej Zimniak, Maciej Żerdziński
15–17 March 2002	Elementary School nr 21 in Poznań	~600	Anna Brzezińska, Lech Jęczmyk, Feliks W. Kres, Maja Lidia Kossakowska, Marek Oramus, Maciej Parowski, Andrzej Pilipiuk, Bogusław Polch, Andrzej Ziemiański, Rafał A. Ziemkiewicz, Andrzej Zimniak
28–30 March 2003	Elementary School nr 21 in Poznań	~700	Anna Brzezińska, Jacek Dukaj, Lech Jęczmyk, Jacek Komuda, Dominika Materska, Marek Oramus, Jacek Sobota, Wojciech Szyda, Andrzej Ziemiański, Andrzej Zimniak
12–14 March 2004	Elementary School nr 21 in Poznań	~750	Artur Baniewicz, Dawid Brykalski, Anna Brzezińska, Tomasz Budzyński, Witold Jabłoński, Darek Jasiczak, Lech Jęczmyk, Marcin Mortka, Maciej Parowski, Romuald Pawlak, Andrzej Sapkowski, Wojtek Sedeńko, Jacek Sobota, Wojciech Świdziniewski
24–26 March 2006	Elementary School nr 21 in Poznań	867	Jarosław Grzędowicz, Maciej Guzek, Marek S. Huberath, Witold Jabłoński, Lech Jęczmyk, Jacek Komuda, Maja Lidia Kossakowska, Marcin Mortka, Staszek Mąderek, Łukasz Orbitowski, Maciej Parowski, Jacek Piekara, Krzysztof Piskorski, Michał Protasiuk, Marcin Przybyłek, Wojciech Szyda, Szczepan Twardoch
23–25 March 2007	Elementary School nr 21 in Poznań	1080	Ewa Białołęcka, Piotr W. Cholewa, Jakub Ćwiek, Jarosław Grzędowicz, Maciej Guzek, Marek S. Huberath, Witold Jabłoński, Lech Jęczmyk, Jacek Komuda, Rafał Kosik, Maja Lidia Kossakowska, Magdalena Kozak, Marcin Mortka, Łukasz Orbitowski, Maciej Parowski, Andrzej Pilipiuk, Michał Protasiuk, Marcin Przybyłek, Wojciech Szyda, Szczepan Twardoch, Andrzej Zimniak, Paweł Zych
28–30 March 2008	Elementary School nr 21 in Poznań, Gymnasium nr 42 in Poznań, Cezamet Hotel	2131	Ewa Białołęcka, Anna Brzezińska, Elżbieta Cherezińska, Michał Cetnarowski, Jakub Ćwiek, Rafał Dębski, Jacek Drewnowski, Jarosław Grzędowicz, Maciej Guzek, Marek S. Huberath, Witold Jabłoński, Lech Jęczmyk, Barbara "Maskotka" Karlik, Jacek Komuda, Rafał Kosik, Maja Lidia Kossakowska, Jacek Kowalski, Magdalena Kozak, Paweł Majka, Paweł Matuszek, Iwona Michałowska-Gabrych, Marcin Mortka, Dominika Oramus, Marek Oramus, Łukasz Orbitowski, Maciej Parowski, Magda Parus, Andrzej Pilipiuk, Michał Protasiuk, Marcin Przybyłek, Piotr Rogoża, Wit Szostak, Wojciech Szyda, Łukasz Śmigiel, Szczepan Twardoch, Konrad Walewski, Robert M. Wegner, Miroslav Žamboch
27–29 March 2009	Elementary School nr 21 in Poznań, Gymnasium nr 42 in Poznań, Cezamet Hotel	2876	Marek Baraniecki, Ewa Białołęcka, Anna Brzezińska, Jakub Ćwiek, Bartosz Grykowski, Maciej Guzek, Marek S. Huberath, Witold Jabłoński, Lech Jęczmyk, Jacek Komuda, Rafał Kosik, Jacek Kowalski, Magdalena Kozak, Iwona Michałowska-Gabrych, Marcin Mortka, Łukasz Orbitowski, Maciej Parowski, Andrzej Pilipiuk, Michał Protasiuk, Marcin Przybyłek, Piotr Rogoża, Edyta Rudolf, Wojciech Siudmak, prof. Antoni Smuszkiewicz, Wit Szostak, Wojciech Szyda, Szczepan Twardoch, Milena Wójtowicz, Andrzej Zimniak
26–28 March 2010	Elementary School nr 21 in Poznań, Gymnasium nr 42 in Poznań, Cezamet Hotel, High and Technical Schools Complex nr 19 in Poznań	3023	Ewa Białołęcka, Michał Bogacki, Elżbieta Cherezińska, Michał Cetnarowski, Jakub Ćwiek, Rafał Dębski, Jacek Drewnowski, Jarosław Grzędowicz, Maciej Guzek, Marek S. Huberath, Witold Jabłoński, Lech Jęczmyk, Barbara "Maskotka" Karlik, Jacek Komuda, Rafał Kosik, Maja Lidia Kossakowska, Jacek Kowalski, Magdalena Kozak, Paweł Majka, Paweł Matuszek, Iwona Michałowska-Gabrych, Marcin Mortka, Dominika Oramus, Marek Oramus, Łukasz Orbitowski, Maciej Parowski, Magda Parus, Agnieszka Piechnik, Andrzej Pilipiuk, Michał Protasiuk, Marcin Przybyłek, Piotr Rogoża, Wit Szostak, Wojciech Szyda, Łukasz Śmigiel, Szczepan Twardoch, Konrad Walewski, Marcin Wolski, Robert M. Wegner
25–27 March 2011	Poznań International Fair, Liceum Ogólnokształcące nr 2 in Poznań	3660	Ewa Białołęcka, Jarosław Błotny, Anna Brzezińska, Michał Cetnarowski, Elżbieta Cherezińska, Jakub Ćwiek, Dariusz Domagalski, Artur Ganszyniec, Jarosław Grzędowicz, Maciej Guzek, Agnieszka Hałas, Marek S. Huberath, Aleksandra Janusz, Lech Jęczmyk, Barbara "Maskotka" Karlik, Jacek Komuda, Piotr Koryś, Rafał Kosik, Maja Lidia Kossakowska, Jacek Kowalski, Staszek Mąderek, Paweł Majka, Michał Markowski, Iwona Michałowska-Gabrych, Marcin Mortka, Piotr Olszówka, Łukasz Orbitowski, Maciej Parowski, Magda Parus, Agnieszka Piechnik, Krzysztof Piskorski, Michał Protasiuk, Piotr Rogoża, Wit Szostak, Artur Szrejter, Wojciech Szyda, Adrian Tchaikovsky, Jakub Żulczyk
23–25 March 2012	Poznań International Fair, Liceum Ogólnokształcące nr 2 in Poznań	6508	Ewa Białołęcka, Jarosław Błotny, Karolina Burda, Michał Cetnarowski, Jakub Ćwiek, Dariusz Domagalski, Grzegorz Drukarczyk, Maciej Guzek, Agnieszka Hałas, Shane Lacy Hensley, Jacek Inglot, Aleksandra Janusz, Lech Jęczmyk, Barbara "Maskotka" Karlik, Tomasz Kołodziejczak, Rafał Kosik, Jacek Kowalski, Magdalena Kozak, Staszek Mąderek, Ian McDonald, Iwona Michałowska-Gabrych, Marcin Mortka, Marta Nowak, Piotr Olszówka, Maciej Parowski, Magda Parus, Romuald Pawlak, Krzysztof Piskorski, Michał Protasiuk, Maciej "Shushei" Ratuszniak, Piotr Rogoża, Grzegorz Rosiński, Robert "Bele" Sienicki, Artur Szrejter, Wojciech Szyda, Łukasz Śmigiel, Michał "Śledziu" Śledziński, Witold Vargas, Robert M. Wegner, Paweł Zych
22–24 March 2013	Poznań International Fair, Liceum Ogólnokształcące nr 2 in Poznań	12,299	Ewa Białołęcka, Sylwia Błach, Michał Bogacz, Anna Brzezińska, Karolina Burda, Michał Cetnarowski, Elżbieta Cherezińska, Adrian Chmielarz, Jakub Ćwiek, Stefan Darda, Jacek Dukaj, Anna Głomb, Jakub Grudziński, Agnieszka Hałas, Sebastian Hetman, Marek S. Huberath, Marcin Hybel, Jacek Inglot, Aneta Jadowska, Aleksandra Janusz, Lech Jęczmyk, Igor Kaczmarek, Anna Kańtoch, Tomasz Kołodziejczak, Jacek Komuda, Rafał Kosik, Maja Lidia Kossakowska, Mateusz Kowalski, Łukasz Malinowski, Iwona Michałowska-Gabrych, Marcin Mortka, Ilona Myszkowska, Konrad Okoński, Łukasz Orbitowski, Maciej Parowski, Magda Parus, Wojciech Pazdur, Krzysztof Piskorski, Bogusław Polch, Michał Protasiuk, Marcin Przybyłek, Andrzej W. Sawicki, Robert Jerzy Szmidt, Wojciech Szyda, Witold Vargas, Robert M. Wegner, Marcin Wełnicki
21–23 March 2014	Poznań International Fair, Liceum Ogólnokształcące nr 2 in Poznań	~24,500	Katarzyna Babis, Ewa Białołęcka, Sylwia Błach, Michał Centnarowski, Jakub Ćwiek, Jakub "Dem" Dębski, Tomek "Quaz" Drabik, Kamil "CTSG" Popielski, Agata "dudsonowa" Rutkowska, Agnieszka Hałas, Jacek Inglot, Aneta Jadowska, Arkadiusz "Dark Archon" Kamiński, Anna Kańtoch, Tomasz Kołodziejczak, Jacek Komuda, Maja Lidia Kossakowska, Iwona Michałowska-Gabrych, Ilona Myszkowska, Łukasz Orbitowski, Maciej Parowski, Andrzej Pilipiuk, Krzysztof Piskorski, Michał Protasiuk, Marcin Rustecki, Robert Sienicki, Wojciech Szyda, Agata Wawryniuk, Andrzej Zimniak, Paweł Zych oraz Piotr "Ramel" Koryś, Maciej "repek" Reputakowski, Wojtek Rzadek, Maciej "lucek" Sabat, Michał "Puszon" Stachyra, Michał Sołtysiak, Rafał Szyma, Mateusz "Craven" Wielgosz
24–26 April 2015	Poznań International Fair, Liceum Ogólnokształcące nr 2 in Poznań	31,495	Anna Kańtoch, Maja Lidia Kossakowska, Maciej Parowski, Andrzej Pilipiuk, Jakub Ćwiek, Robert J. Szmidt, Ewa Białołęcka, Robert M. Wegner, Jarosław Grzędowicz and lots more others
8–10 April 2016	Poznań International Fair, Liceum Ogólnokształcące nr 2 in Poznań	40,622	Michał Azarewicz, Michał Cholewa, Piotr W. Cholewa, Jakub Ćwiek, Christian Dumais, Michał Gołkowski, Marek Grzywacz, Kazimierz Kyrcz, John Layman, Marcin Mortka, Katarzyna Niemczyk, Wiktor Noczkin, Oksana Pankjewa, Maciej Parowski, Andrzej Pilipiuk, Mark Rein•Hagen, Małgorzata Saramonowicz, Agnieszka Stemalszyk, Aleksandra "Shappi" Tora, Witold Vargas, David Weber, John Wick, Paweł Zych, Miroslav Žamboch
28–30 April 2017	Poznań International Fair	44,000	Robert M. Wegner, Michał Cetnarowski, Andrzej Ziemiański, Evan Currie, Maja Lidia Kossakowska, Peter Watts, Magda Kozak, Andrzej Pilipiuk, Marcin Podlewski, Jarosław Grzędowicz, Jacek Komuda, Jakub Ćwiek, Rafał Kosik, Kazimierz Kyrcz, Paweł Majka, Marcin Mortka, Marta Kisiel, Katarzyna Miszczuk, Krzysztof Piskorski, Siri Pettersen, Samantha Shannon, Robert Szmidt, Timo Vuorensola and other
18–20 May 2018	Poznań International Fair	43,034	Orson Scott Card, Patricia Briggs, Graham Masterton, Felicia Day, Jon Bailey, Robin Hobb
26–28 April 2019	Poznań International Fair	52,120	Mark Rein-Hagen, Andrzej Pilipiuk, Aneta Jadowska, Angus Watson, Ben Kane, Marcin Przybyłek, Michał Gołkowski, Paweł Majka, Rafał Kosik, Robert M. Wegner, Bogusław Polch, Maciej Kur, Stan Sakai, Christopher Judge, Marta Dobecka, Stanisław Mąderek
17–19 June 2022	Poznań International Fair	55,847	Edward James Olmos, Mike Pondsmith, Graham Masterton, Samantha Shannon and other
16–18 June 2023	Poznań International Fair	52,968	Victoria V.E. Schwab, Brandon Mull, Dmitry Glukhovsky, Maciej Musiał, and others
14–16 June 2024	Poznań International Fair	58,632	Morgane Polanski, Miranda Otto, Kevin McNally, Bruce Boxleitner, and others
13–15 June 2025	Poznań International Fair		Patricia Briggs, Mark Sheppard

== Awards ==
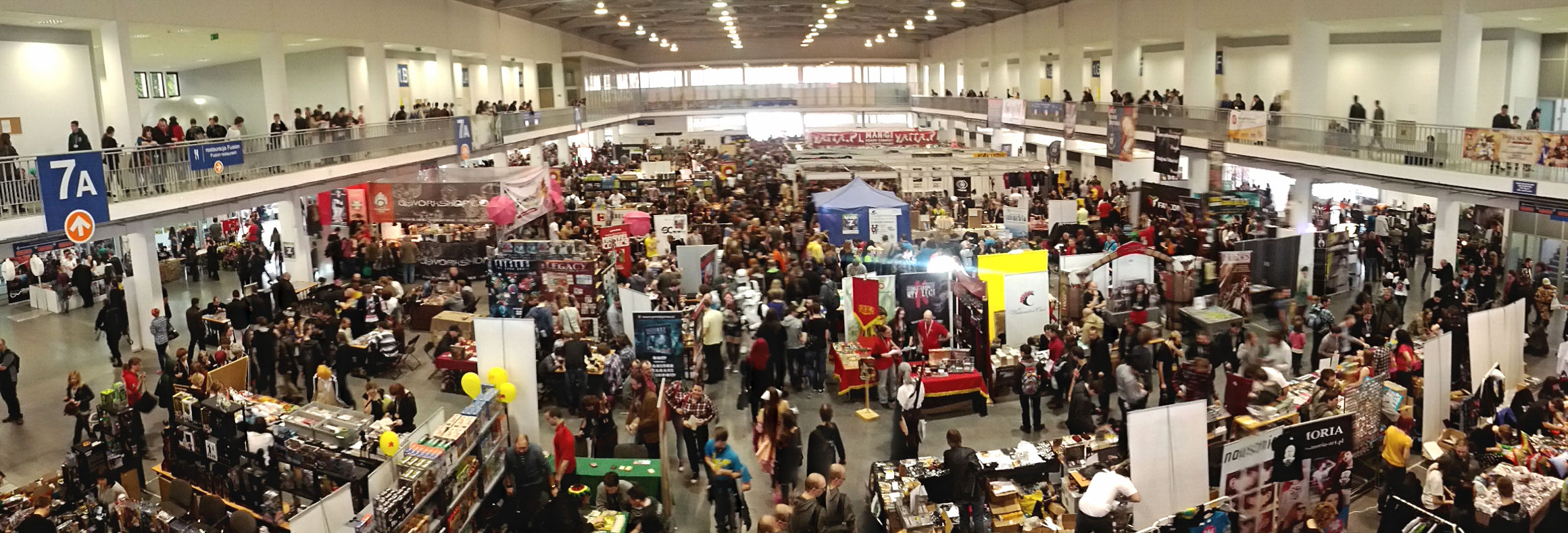
Pyrkon 2014: Vendors' Hall

- contest of "The Convention Guide-Book" Web Portal (Informator Konwentowy): "The Best Fan Convention of the Season"
  - Pyrkon 2006 – 2nd place (Winter 2005/2006 edition)
  - Pyrkon 2007 – 1st place (Winter 2006/2007 edition)
- contest of "The Convention Guide-Book" Web Portal: "The Best Fan Convention of the Year"
  - Pyrkon 2008 – 1st place
- contest of "The Convention Guide-Book" Web Portal: "Fan's Choice"
  - Pyrkon 2006 – 2nd place (Winter 2005/2006 edition)
  - Pyrkon 2007 – 1st place (Winter 2006/2007 edition)
  - Pyrkon 2008 – 1st place (Year 2008 edition)
- plebiscite of "The Cathedral" Web Portal (Katedra): "Science Fiction" in category "The best fan convention or other SF mass event", in year 2012 simply "Event"
  - Pyrkon 2007 – 1st place
  - Pyrkon 2008 – 3rd place
  - Pyrkon 2009 – 3rd place
  - Pyrkon 2010 – 1st place
  - Pyrkon 2011 – 1st place
  - Pyrkon 2012 – 1st place
