= Wypychacz zwierząt =

Collection of short stories by Jarosław Grzędowicz

- Author: Jarosław Grzędowicz
- Language: Polish
- Genre: horror fiction, science fiction
- Publisher: Fabryka Słów
- Publication date: 2008
- Publication place: Poland
- Media type: collection of short stories

Wypychacz zwierząt (The Taxidermist) is a collection of horror and alternative history short stories by Jarosław Grzędowicz, published by Fabryka Słów in 2008.

The book consists of 13 stories: Pocałunek Loisetty (The Kiss of Loisetta), Buran wieje z tamtej strony (The Buran Blows from the Other Side), Wilcza zamieć (Wolf Storm), Farewell Blues, Zegarmistrz i łowca motyli (The Watchmaker and the Butterfly Hunter), Hobby ciotki Konstancji (Aunt Konstancja's Hobby), Nagroda (The Prize), Obrona konieczna (Necessary Defense), Specjały kuchni wschodu (Eastern Cuisine Specials), Weneckie zapusty (Venetian Carnival), Wypychacz zwierząt (The Taxidermist), Weekend w Spestreku (Weekend in Spestrek), and Trzeci Mikołaj (The Third Santa Claus). The book also includes an author's afterword in which Grzędowicz describes the circumstances of the stories' creation.

This collection is Grzędowicz’s second anthology of short stories. While reviewers praised the quality of the texts, they noted that the collection did not feature any new stories. Two of the stories included were previously awarded industry prizes: Buran wieje z tamtej strony won the Sfinks Award in 2004, and Wilcza zamieć won the Janusz A. Zajdel Award in 2006.

== History of editions ==
The collection was published by Fabryka Słów in June 2008 and was reissued in 2013 and 2021.

The collection does not include new stories – all the pieces it contains had been published earlier, some in other anthologies, many in the literary supplement of Fakt. Reviewers criticized the fact that the book did not contain any new texts, which is often considered an "unwritten rule" for such collections.

The stories included in the collection were previously published in:

- Pocałunek Loisetty – anthology Małodobry (A Little Good), Fabryka Słów 2004;
- Buran wieje z tamtej strony – anthology Wizje alternatywne #5 (Alternative Visions #5), Solaris 2004;
- Wilcza zamieć – anthology Deszcze niespokojne (Restless Rains), Fabryka Słów 2005;
- Farewell Blues – anthology Niech żyje Polska. Hura! t.1 (Long Live Poland. Hooray! Vol. 1), Fabryka Słów 2006;
- Zegarmistrz i łowca motyli – anthology Tempus fugit, Fabryka Słów 2006;
- Hobby ciotki Konstancji – Fakt;
- Nagroda – Fakt;
- Obrona konieczna – Fakt;
- Specjały kuchni wschodu – Fakt;
- Weneckie zapusty – Fakt;
- Wypychacz zwierząt – Fakt;
- Weekend w Spestreku – anthology PL +50, Wydawnictwo Literackie 2004;
- Trzeci Mikołaj – Fakt.

== Plot ==
Pocałunek Loisetty is set during the French Revolution. The main character is a sadistic executioner-revolutionary, fascinated by a new invention: the guillotine.

Buran wieje z tamtej strony is an alternate history story that positively portrays Russia, which did not experience the October Revolution and flourished under capitalism, yet is still engaged in a Cold War with socialist America. The story prominently features discussions and reflections between two characters in a Siberian blizzard (the titular buran), including one character who is an escapee from a Soviet labor camp. This story won the Sfinks Award for Best Short Story in 2004.

Wilcza zamieć combines elements of Norse mythology and Kriegsmarine within the context of Nazi occultism. It revolves around a German submarine tasked with a mission at the end of World War II to make contact with the Scandinavian underworld. It won the Janusz A. Zajdel Award for Best Short Story in 2006.

Farewell Blues tells the story of people fleeing a troubled Earth, choosing to emigrate to a world created for them by Aliens.

Zegarmistrz i łowca motyli deals with time travel, with the titular butterfly referencing the butterfly effect. The story is set in pre-war Poland and revolves around the struggles of special agents traveling through time.

Hobby ciotki Konstancji is a tale about inheritance and ghosts.

Nagroda explores exotic vacations of employees from a large corporation.

Obrona konieczna concerns a group of friends looking for a way to deal with burglars.

Specjały kuchni wschodu is categorized by reviewers as horror.

Weneckie zapusty is set in Venice and features an unfulfilled sexually ghost of Casanova.

Wypychacz zwierząt centers on the death of a pet (a cat) and the consequences of this tragedy for the household, especially when the main character attempts to bring it back to life.

Weekend w Spestreku presents an alternate Poland where part of the country remains a socialist (communist) special economic zone, continuing the inefficient political-economic model of the Polish People's Republic (shortage economy) while integrating extreme political correctness and feminism.

Trzeci Mikołaj is set in a Christmas-themed atmosphere.

== Reception and analysis ==
In 2008, Paweł Dunin-Wąsowicz reviewed the book for the magazine Lampa. He criticized the collection for mostly containing previously published texts. He described the language of the stories as "hyper-correct and transparent", considering it a common weakness among most authors published by Fabryka Słów. Simultaneously, he praised the anthology as "a very good execution of the model of popular literature often based on a fantastical concept", blending horror fiction (e.g., Wypychacz zwierząt and Hobby ciotki Konstancji) with alternate history (e.g., Weekend w Spestreku, Buran wieje z tamtej strony, and Zegarmistrz i łowca motyli). He considered Weekend w Spestreku the best story in the collection while criticizing Farewell Blues for being too tendentious in its critique of political correctness.

In the same year, Adam Florczyk reviewed the book for the portal Paradoks. He called the collection "excellent in terms of writing", but noted it was merely "a reheated collection of texts", without even one new story. Many stories in the anthology, he believed, served as "training material for future authors on how to write succinctly, concisely, and surprisingly at the same time". He also remarked that in his texts, the author "strongly highlights his liberal worldview".

Florczyk delved deeper into several stories, calling Hobby ciotki Konstancji "subversive", and praising Zegarmistrz i łowca motyli for "a daring idea and questions about moral relativism", while also criticizing it for "lacking lightness" and having logical inconsistencies. He found Farewell Blues to be "a nostalgic story about people tired of their world", while Weekend w Spestreku was a "brilliant "depiction of an alternative world, albeit with "the plot taking a back seat". He described Buran wieje z tamtej strony as "a heavily talkative story, although with an action-movie-worthy finale [...] Yet Grzędowicz manages to capture the spirit of Russian literature and a longing for "a good Russian neighbor". He praised Wilcza zamieć for its "great blending of seemingly mismatched elements", with a mix of a realistic portrayal of life on a submarine and a psychological portrayal of a demoralized German crew, contrasting with a humorous representation of Norse gods, producing "a stunning effect". Lastly, he described Pocałunek Loisetty as "a gem of the collection [...] a mood-filled, shocking text [...] a poignant story full of genuine emotions".

Florczyk also noted that with Farewell Blues and Weekend w Spestreku, "Grzędowicz is a worthy successor to Polish social science fiction". He appreciated how the former story criticized "idiotic regulations and constant surveillance, and how the latter condemned twisted forms of political correctness [...] the belief that the state knows best what's good for its citizens", as well as totalitarian regimes "built on lies and ideology", while simultaneously praising liberal values like individual freedom.

That same year, two reviewers wrote for the zine Esensja about the book.

Agnieszka Szady gave the collection a score of 90/100, praising both its design and the quality of the works. She noted that while some of the shorter stories were relatively weak, she acknowledged that "even the weaker stories are worth reading as curiosities". She found the texts "interesting" and "well-written fantasy", although she criticized "the constant complaints in every other text about life-restricting bans and protections".

Szady also complimented the anthology's afterword, where the author explains the circumstances behind the stories' creation. She considered Wilcza zamieć the best story, praising the main character ("the author has a talent for creating male characters [...] with realistic behavior and motivations, which makes readers fully engage in their fate"), the story's construction ("the writer skillfully builds tension and gradually reveals secrets"), and the backdrop ("an extremely vivid, almost cinematic depiction of life and combat on a submarine"). She also rated Zegarmistrz i łowca motyli highly for its sympathetic protagonist and effective world-building. Regarding Buran wieje z tamtej strony, Szady felt it expressed the author's puzzlement over why "a society that produces such kind people also creates such a hostile state", and also "a longing for the kind of Russia we'd like to have as a neighbor". She criticized Weekend w Spestreku as unsubtle and too short. Both this story and Farewell Blues she critiqued as political, saying of the latter, "the ending feels forced, and there's little in the text that stays in memory".

Szady praised Pocałunek Loisetty as a successful horror story that captures the atmosphere of the era. She dismissed Nagroda, Obrona konieczna, and Specjały kuchni wschodu as short anecdotes and rather "predictable [...] beer-time stories". Trzeci Mikołaj she described as a "propaganda piece" against consumerism. Szady praised Hobby ciotki Konstancji as "interesting" and Wypychacz zwierząt as having "an old idea, but what execution!", though she criticized it for being too short. About Weneckie zapusty, she said it was a minimalist morality play with a rare unlikeable protagonist, but praised the story for its "unreal, dreamlike atmosphere of the labyrinthine Venetian streets".

Jakub Gałka rated the collection lower – 60/100 – criticizing it for containing only two good stories (Wilcza zamieć and Buran wieje z tamtej strony). He appreciated the atmosphere in Wilcza zamieć (calling it Lovecraftian), the characters, the plot, well-used technical jargon, and "reflections on attitudes towards war", but criticized the "poorly resolved ending", considering the story a weaker version of David Brin's Thor Meets Captain America. He called Buran wieje z tamtej strony the best and "masterful" story in the collection, praising its concept and atmosphere. However, he criticized the short stories written for Fakt, saying that "neither the topics discussed nor the supposedly surprising twists are anything new for a moderately well-read science fiction fan".

He felt that many of these stories were thinly veiled presentations of the author's political and cultural views, describing several as "using science fiction as a propaganda megaphone". He classified Obrona konieczna and Specjały kuchni wschodu as macabre stories, and Nagroda and Trzeci Mikołaj as "complaints about Big Evil Global Corporations and Rampant Consumerism"; the other two short stories (Hobby ciotki Konstancji and Weneckie zapusty) he found above average. He also considered Weekend w Spestreku and Farewell Blues similarly political and tendentious, calling the former a failed critique and caricature of the European Union; both stories, he felt, "end abruptly". He criticized Pocałunek Loisetty as "a gloomy tale for underappreciated emos, full of naturalistic cruelty and pessimism, comparing it to the worst works of Maja Lidia Kossakowska" and described Zegarmistrz i łowca motyli as "merely passable and overall unimpressive".

The book also received two reviews on the portal Poltergeist.

The first review was written by Bartosz Szczyżański. He rated the collection very positively (7.5 out of 10), praising the style as "phenomenal", the descriptions as "expansive and interesting", and the dialogues as "remarkably natural", calling the author "the finest pen in Polish science fiction". He also considered the publication itself a success, including its aesthetic cover. The only drawback noted was the lack of any new material in the collection; while recommending it, he considered it weaker than the author’s previous collection. The literary vignettes included in the collection were deemed successful, "written with extraordinary care and amusing... all the stories develop swiftly, then surprise with their endings and delight with their punchlines", although they were seen as less valuable than longer works.

Discussing specific stories, he considered Buran wieje z tamtej strony the best, describing it as "perfect" and "gripping", praising the plot, narration, conclusion, and "the perfectly balanced dose of science fiction". He also commended the positive portrayal of Russians, comparing the motif to the works of Kir Bulychev. The second-best story in the collection was Wilcza zamieć ("surprising but fascinating"), also praising the author’s "perfect knowledge" of maritime topics, military, and mythology. Zegarmistrz i łowca motyli was praised for its innovative take on "the overused theme of time travel", with positive notes on the story's structure and characters.

Farewell Blues was seen as a dystopia akin to George Orwell's 1984, addressing the "societal suppression of individual aspirations", with the reviewer appreciating the "intriguing vision of the future and interesting conclusion". He found Weekend w Spestreku weaker, stating that while it "fascinates and intrigues", it had flaws such as weak supporting characters and uninteresting conclusions to some plotlines. He also spoke positively of Pocałunek Loisetty, noting that it was a macabre tale that could repel some readers due to its brutality ("I haven't read such suggestive descriptions of torture in a long time").

The second review for this site was by Michał Sołtysiak, who rated the collection even higher (8.5 out of 10), writing that these are "well-written stories" that, although previously published, he "was happy to revisit". Among the shorter forms, he considered Trzeci Mikołaj the best, describing it as written with "a great deal of warmth", while also praising Hobby ciotki Konstancji and the titular Wypychacz zwierząt, with the latter two stories categorized as macabre, while Hobby was seen as "both gruesome and amusing". He called Wilcza zamieć the best story of the collection, a "masterpiece", and a "neatly written war tale". He viewed Buran wieje z tamtej strony as a "great" alternate history and simultaneously "the author's commentary on totalitarianism". Zegarmistrz i łowca motyli was described as a "brutal evaluation of our reality". Both Weekend w Spestreku and Farewell Blues were praised as "excellent pieces about social issues", serving as successful critiques of political correctness and corporatism.

Krzysztof Pochmara also reviewed the book for the Katedra portal, giving it a more critical assessment. He found the collection to be mediocre, acknowledging the quality of the texts but feeling that they were less original compared to the author's previous works. He criticized the longer pieces as "overly political," perceiving the collection as having a relatively right-wing political fiction. He also took issue with the lack of new material and found the cover "distasteful".

In 2008, Robert Ziębiński reviewed the book for Newsweek Polska. He considered Buran wieje z tamtej strony and Weekend w Spestreku the strongest stories in the collection, highlighting their common theme of "two visions of the same country colliding". He described Wilcza zamieć as an "engaging, fantastical variation on Lothar-Günther Buchheim’s famous novel 'Das Boot'". He also spoke highly of Farewell Blues, saying it made a "big impression" and that its initially familiar theme of contact with aliens was "culminated with a surprisingly dramatic finale". Among the shorter works, he praised Wypychacz zwierząt as "amusing" and Obrona konieczna as "clever", while also noting Nagroda and Weneckie zapusty as worthy of attention. The weaker stories, in his view, were Hobby ciotki Konstancji, which he found "uninspiring", and Zegarmistrz i łowca motyli, which he said "falls apart into inconsistent fragments". In summary, Ziębiński concluded that the book was "worth having on the shelf".

In 2013, Jan Bodakowski reviewed the second edition for Salon24.pl, calling the collection "a must-read for those recognizing the pathologies of modernity". He considered Weekend w Spestreku the best story, comparing it to George Orwell’s 1984 and Aldous Huxley’s Brave New World, saying the author "perfectly shows how terrifying a country can become under the terror of the left, LGBT, environmentalists, feminism, socialism, and political correctness". Writing about Farewell Blues, he saw it as a reference to Piotr Szulkin’s film The War of the Worlds: Next Century, addressing themes of "immoral politicians collaborating with aliens, propaganda, irrational expectations, and grim reality". Bodakowski also noted various references in other stories: Wilcza zamieć to the Thorgal comic, Pocałunek Loisetty to H. P. Lovecraft's works, and Zegarmistrz i łowca motyli to The Terminator. He also praised the miniatures for their critique of "contemporary pathologies": Nagroda ("exposing corporate corruption"), Obrona konieczna ("liberal penal policy"), Weneckie zapusty ("immorality"), and Wypychacz zwierząt ("biotechnology and consumer society"). He considered Trzeci Mikołaj to reveal the "true meaning of Christmas" and described Hobby ciotki Konstancji as a "funny horror with a surprising ending".

In 2021, the third edition received a review by Konrad Kowalski on the Paradoks portal. He called the collection "famous" and classified it as "a classic", praising the stories as still relevant and showcasing the author’s literary prowess. According to Kowalski, the author "navigates between different literary styles, successfully mastering each". He particularly appreciated Hobby ciotki Konstancji ("the punchline leaves the reader in awe"), Pocałunek Loisetty ("for its approach to humanizing objects"), Obrona konieczna ("bittersweet laughter"), and Trzeci Mikołaj, which he saw as an homage to A Christmas Carol. He also praised the author's afterword, which contained an analysis of the stories.

That same year, in a book about Polish science fiction, Andrzej Pilipiuk described Buran wieje z tamtej strony as "a gem in an excellent collection", while Maciej Parowski praised Wilcza zamieć, noting that its "nautical elements showed impressive expertise, while the mythological ones were terrifying".
