= The Lord of the Ice Garden =

Fantasy series by Jarosław Grzędowicz

- Author: Jarosław Grzędowicz
- Original title: Pan Lodowego Ogrodu
- Language: Polish
- Genre: Science fiction, Fantasy
- Published: vol I: 2005 vol II: 2007 vol III: 2009 vol IV: 2012
- Publisher: Fabryka Słów

The Lord of the Ice Garden (Polish: Pan Lodowego Ogrodu) is a four-volume science fiction and fantasy novel by Polish writer Jarosław Grzędowicz. The plot tells the story of a special forces soldier from Earth, dispatched to investigate a mystery on another planet, where magic exists.

The first volume was published by the Fabryka Słów publishing house in 2005. The series was favorably received by the readers, compared to The Witcher, and won major prizes in Polish science fiction: Janusz A. Zajdel, Nautilus and the Sphinx Award. Following volumes of the saga were released in 2007, 2009 and 2012.

== Plot ==
The protagonist, Vuko Drakkainen, a special-forces soldier, equipped with the latest technology from Earth, making him almost a superhuman (effectively, a supersoldier), is dispatched to a planet called Midgaard, to look for human scientists from a covert research facility with whom all contact was lost two years earlier. The task, however, is extremely difficult, because the planet is inhabited by anthropoid civilization, moreover magic is present there. To become more like the local people, Vuko undergoes eye surgery and adopts the local name Ulf Nitj’sefni. A parasitic fungus – Cyfral was implanted in his brain.

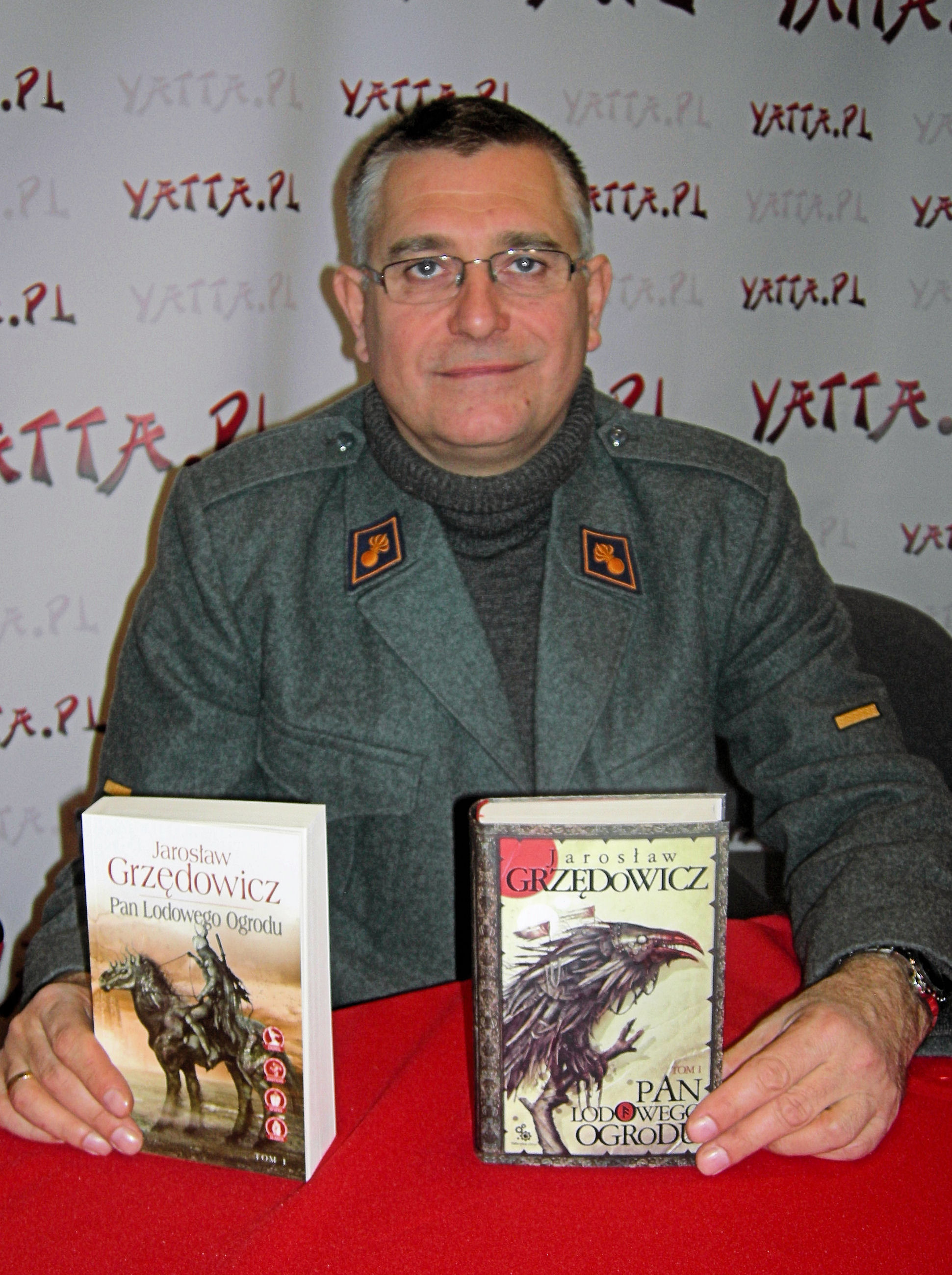
Jarosław Grzędowicz at Pyrkon 2014, holding two different edition versions of the series.

In parallel, the fate of Filar, the young Prince of the Tiger Throne, is presented. At the same time, the ancient faith in the Underground Mother is returning in the empire, and temples are being built in the cities – Red Towers. Social unrest caused by the drought is increasing. The emperor decides to destroy the Red Towers. As a result of the coup d'état, the imperial family dies, and the young son of the emperor as the last descendant of the family must escape. He is accompanied by Brus, a trusted man familiar with martial arts and survival. Both of them travel sidelong and observe the fall of the empire and the takeover of power by the fanatical followers of the Underground Mother.

It turns out that half of the human scientists have died, while the remaining four found themselves in a new situation, becoming Doers – people who could magically shape reality around them. Drakkainen's main opponents are two of them, who strive for world domination with ruthless methods. The third is insane, while the fourth becomes his ally. Eventually, the two main characters, Vuko and Filar, find each other in the Ice Garden and form an alliance to save the world.

== Publication history ==
The series was published in Poland by Fabryka Słów in four volumes.

- vol I: 2005
- vol II: 2007
- vol III: 2009
- vol IV: 2012

== Translations ==
- Czech editions:
  - Pán ledové zahrady 1, pub. Triton, Prague, 2007, ISBN 978-80-7387-031-7
  - Pán ledové zahrady 2, pub. Triton, Prague, 2008, ISBN 978-80-7387-150-5
  - Pán ledové zahrady 3, pub. Triton, Prague, 2011, ISBN 978-80-7387-442-1
  - Pán ledové zahrady 4, pub. Triton, Prague, 2013, ISBN 978-80-7387-711-8
- Russian editions:
  - Владыка Ледяного Сада: Ночной Странник, pub. AST, Moscow, 2017, ISBN 978-5-17-102084-2
  - Владыка Ледяного Сада: В сердце тьмы, pub. AST, Moscow, 2017, ISBN 978-5-17-106005-3
  - Владыка Ледяного Сада: Носитель судьбы, pub. AST, Moscow, 2018, ISBN 978-5-17-106777-9
  - Владыка Ледяного Сада: Конец пути, pub. AST, Moscow, 2018, ISBN 978-5-17-109322-8

== Awards ==
The series won several major prizes in Polish science fiction: Janusz A. Zajdel, Nautilus and the Sfinks Award.

Volume 1 won the Zajdel Award in 2006 as well as the Sfinks Award.

Volumes 2, 3 and 4 were nominated for the Zajdel Award. Volume 3 also won the Nautilus Award in 2009 and Sfinks Award in 2010.

== Reception ==
After the publication of the first volume, the series received very favorable reception among the fans and critics, quickly winning several major Polish literary science fiction and fantasy awards. The author has been described as the successor to Andrzej Sapkowski and the resulting series compared to The Witcher. Already in 2012 the series has been described as having a "cult" status.

In 2005, volume I was reviewed by Anna Woźniak for the Polish "Lampa" magazine. The reviewer praised the "extremely successful finale", the "simple and logical scheme" ensuring the novel's "coherence and lightness", and the author himself as a talented person, of whose talent the book is a "masterful confirmation".

== Analysis ==
The series has been described as mixing fantasy and science fiction genres.

Karolina Kowalczyk described Vuko as having many characteristics of a fairy tale hero. She notes that while Vuko is generally a sympathetic protagonist with whom readers can identify, he is also flawed. One of his major flaws is a type of supremacist, superior attitude towards the natives, whom he often considers inferior, comparing his status as a "visitor from advanced civilization" to their status as "primitive barbarians". Kowalczyk also discuss the story of Vuko as the story of cultural assimilation and acceptance of "the other", as throughout the book, Vuko, effectively cut off from contact with Earth, is increasingly "going native", becoming influenced with and accepting of the local culture.

Anita Całek notes that one of the themes of the series is the exploration of an alien life and culture, and discusses the role of Vuko as a mediator between human and alien cultures.

Ksenia Olkusz in turn looked at Vuko's character as that of a soldier or warrior archetype, discussing his role as a hero (a "fantasy warrior"), and his aspects such as being effectively a superhuman or a supersoldier. She also discusses the concept of warrior culture as seen in the series, and notes numerous inspirations and references to Scandinavian mythology and Japanese culture (the concept of a samurai).

== Other media ==
The series inspired a board game, The Lord of the Ice Garden, published in 2014 in Polish and English. A video game titled The Night Wanderer, scheduled for release in 2025, is also based upon the books.
