= Science Fiction (Polish magazine) =

Polish magazine

Science Fiction (from 2005 Science Fiction, Fantasy i Horror) was a Polish speculative fiction monthly magazine. It was established in 2001 under the name Science Fiction by Robert J. Szmidt, who was also the first editor. It is geared mostly towards Polish fantasy and science fiction, but occasionally publishes translations, primarily from non-English languages. The headquarters was in Katowice.

In 2005 the magazine was renamed to Science Fiction, Fantasy i Horror. Since 2009 it was published by Fabryka Słów. Later editor was Rafał Dębski.

Notable authors who were associated with the magazine include Feliks W. Kres, Andrzej Pilipiuk, Jarosław Grzędowicz, Romuald Pawlak, Adam Cebula, Marek Żelkowski, Wiktor Żwikiewicz, Jacek Dukaj.

From 2004 the magazine sponsored the Nautilus Award.

The magazine ceased publication in 2012.
