= Werewolf: The Apocalypse – Heart of the Forest =

- Developer: Different Tales
- Publisher: Walkabout Games
- Designers: Jacek Brzeziński; Artur Ganszyniec
- Artists: Ireneusz Konior; Rafał Kucharczuk; Monika Lipińska; Magdalena Pankiewicz; Waldemar Zdziebko
- Writers: Artur Ganszyniec; Marta Malinowska; Joanna Wołyńska-Ganszyniec
- Composers: Jacek Brzeziński; Przemek Moszczyński; Robert Purzycki
- Series: Werewolf: The Apocalypse
- Platforms: Linux; MacOS; Microsoft Windows; Nintendo Switch; PlayStation 4; Xbox One
- Release: Linux, MacOS, Windows; October 13, 2020; Nintendo Switch; January 7, 2021; PlayStation 4, Xbox One; February 24, 2021
- Genres: Visual novel, role-playing

Werewolf: The Apocalypse – Heart of the Forest is a visual novel role-playing video game developed by Different Tales and published by Walkabout Games. It was originally released on October 13, 2020 for Linux, MacOS, Microsoft Windows. A Nintendo Switch version was released on January 7, 2021, and also released for PlayStation 4 and Xbox One on February 24, 2021. It is based on the tabletop role-playing game Werewolf: The Apocalypse, and is part of the larger World of Darkness series.

The player takes the role of Maia Boroditch, an American woman of Polish descent, who has recurring nightmares about a forest and wolves, and travels to Białowieża in Poland to learn about her family history and the primeval Białowieża Forest. The gameplay is text-based, and consists of reading narration while making decisions that affect the story's direction and Maia's personality. Actions consume rage and willpower resources, and affect what actions can be performed in the future.

The game is designed by Jacek Brzeziński and Artur Ganszyniec, and is themed around anger and activism in times of climate change and ecological disasters, portrayed through werewolf myths, and taking influence from Polish werewolf legends. The writing team, consisting of Ganszyniec, Marta Malinowska, and Joanna Wołyńska-Ganszyniec, began scriptwriting with creating Maia; they chose to create a female protagonist to go against what they saw as a trend of women in horror stories portrayed as helpless or femme fatales. The game saw positive reviews, citing its atmosphere and immersion, its art style, and the weight of player choices.

== Gameplay ==
The player reads narration, and makes decisions that affect the direction of the plot and the player character's personality.

Werewolf: The Apocalypse – Heart of the Forest is a visual novel role-playing game with tabletop role-playing game-style mechanics. The gameplay is text based, and has the player read narration accompanied by audio and illustrations. The player can move to different locations by selecting them on a map.

Throughout the game, the player makes decisions that affect the player character's personality and goal, how other characters feel about her, the direction of the narrative, and what actions can be performed in different situations. Performing actions consumes two resources – rage, which allows the player to be brazen, direct and proactive, but possibly less open and empathetic, and willpower, which allows the player to make hard choices – meaning that the player must decide what moments are worth spending them on. Willpower is regained by taking steps toward the player character's goal, which is chosen by the player in the beginning of the game. The player character's personality, her health, and the condition of her mind and body are updated on an in-game character sheet.

In addition to affecting character statistics like spirituality and cunning, the player's choices end up assigning their character one of five auspices based on lunar phases, shaping what kind of person she is within the Garou werewolf society and what abilities she will have: the new moon is related to stealth and trickery; the crescent moon is related to spirituality; the half moon is related to balance and wise decision-making; the gibbous moon is related to story-telling and lore-keeping; and the full moon is related to viciousness and being a spirit warrior.

== Synopsis ==
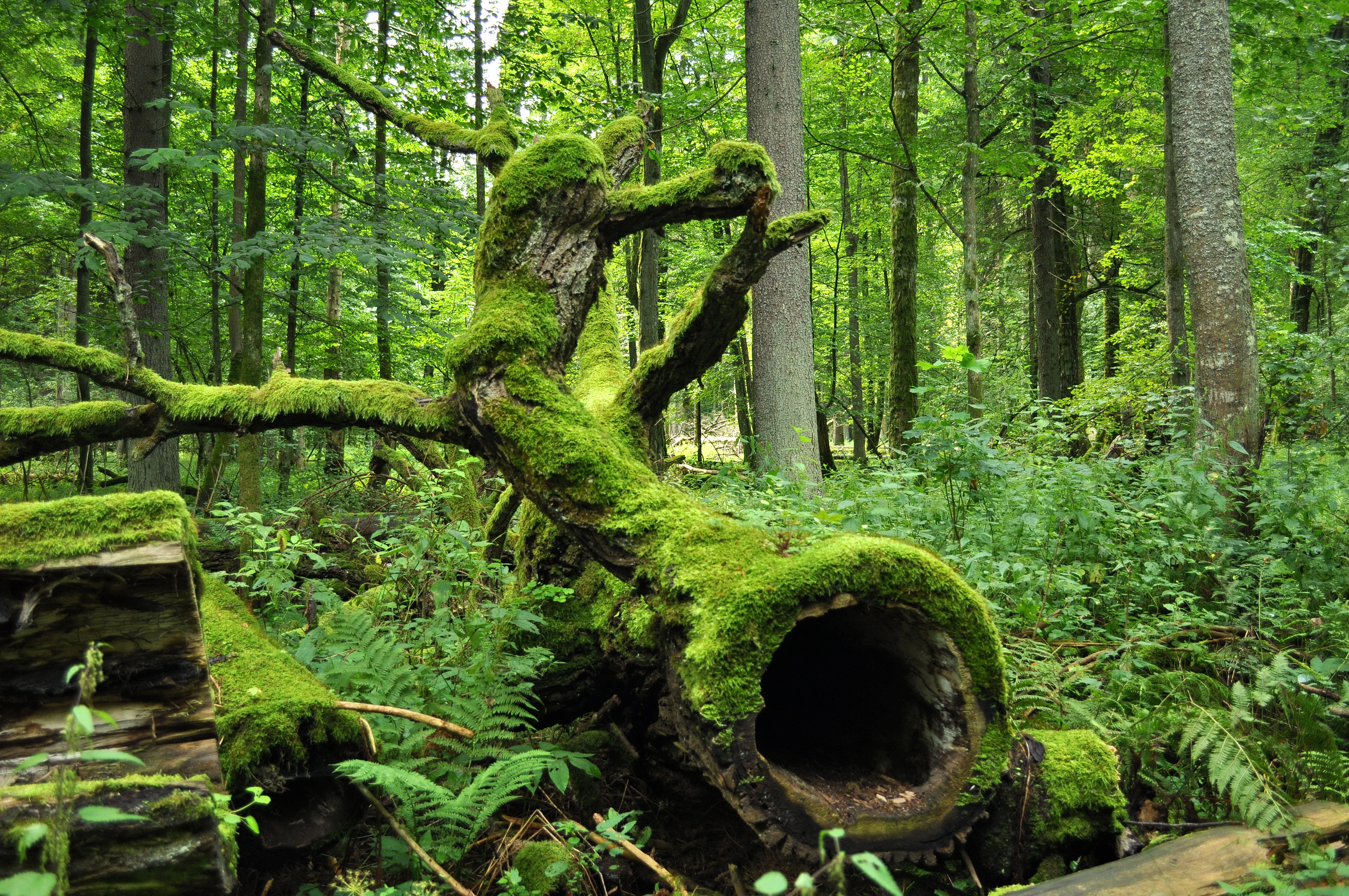
Maia travels to the Białowieża Forest, one of the last European primeval forests.

The story is set in Poland, in the World of Darkness, and has the player take the role of Maia Boroditch, a 24-year-old American woman of Polish descent. She has recurring nightmares of a forest, wolves, and blood, and feels a connection to the forest that drives her to travel to Białowieża in Poland to learn about her family history. There, she meets the guide Daniel, fellow student Anya, and the local resident Bartek, and explores the Białowieża Forest, one of the last remaining primeval forests in Europe, visiting sacred spots including an ancient burial site, an abandoned wolf den, and a ceremonial place of power.

== Development ==
Heart of the Forest was developed by Different Tales and published by Walkabout Games, and designed by Jacek Brzeziński and Artur Ganszyniec, who previously directed and wrote The Witcher. The writing team included Ganszyniec, Marta Malinowska, and Joanna Wołyńska-Ganszyniec, and the game's audio was directed by Brzeziński, with ambient tracks composed by Przemek Moszczyński, and melodic tracks by Robert Purzycki; the soundtrack also includes the song "Vaukalak" by the Belarusian music group Irdorath. The visuals, which include a mix of edited photographs, paintings, and illustrations, were created by Ireneusz Konior, Rafał Kucharczuk, Monika Lipińska, Magdalena Pankiewicz, and Waldemar Zdziebko.

Based on White Wolf Publishing's tabletop role-playing game Werewolf: The Apocalypse, the game was designed to adapt the experience of playing the tabletop role-playing game, with the game serving as the gamemaster guiding the player; it is however designed both with fans of the series and those new to it in mind. The game is themed around anger, activism and "savage resistance" in times of climate change and ecological disasters, portrayed through werewolf myths, and explores how rage can get things done. The Polish setting, which is entirely based on real-world locations in Poland, was decided on to emphasize the "world" in World of Darkness, showing that all parts of the world are reflected in the series' setting, not just the United States; the setting was also chosen as the developers saw the deforestation in Białowieża as thematically appropriate for a Werewolf: The Apocalypse adaptation. Also matching the Polish setting, the game takes influence from Polish werewolf legends.

Scriptwriting began with the creation of Maia as a character. The developers knew from the start that they wanted to write a game with a female protagonist, to go against what they saw as a trend of women in horror stories being relegated to damsel in distress and femme fatale types of roles, and show that it is a universal type of story that does not rely on characters having a certain gender. This choice was also in part made because most of the writers on the development team are women.

The game was announced in June 2020 with a teaser trailer during the Future Games Show, and was released on October 13, 2020 for Linux, MacOS, and Microsoft Windows. A Nintendo Switch version was released on January 7, 2021, and PlayStation 4 and Xbox One versions are planned to follow on February 24, 2021.

== Reception ==
Reception

Aggregate scores
| Aggregator | Score |
|---|---|
| Metacritic | PC: 78/100; PS4: 62/100; XONE: 76/100; NS: 73/100 |
| OpenCritic | 68% recommend |

Review scores
| Publication | Score |
|---|---|
| Adventure Gamers | 4.5/5 |
| Nintendo Life | 6/10 |
| RPGFan | 85/100 |

The game received mixed reviews by both players and critics. The review aggregator OpenCritic assessed that the game received strong approval, being recommended by 68% of critics.

Preview impressions were positive, praising its atmosphere, immersive writing, art style, and the weight of the player's choices. Comic Book Resources liked how the game is set outside of the United States, a common setting for World of Darkness stories.
