= Wolsung =

Polish tabletop role-playing game franchise

Wolsung is a Polish tabletop role-playing game franchise set in a steampunk-inspired fantasy world. Developed by Artur Ganszyniec and Maciej Sabat, and released by Kuźnia Gier, the game combines elements of Victorian-era aesthetics with magic, advanced steam technology, and pulp-fiction-style adventure.

Wolsung's primary medium is a role-playing game, but the setting has also been adapted to other media, including board games and two fiction anthologies. The first Wolsung medium, Wolsung: The Boardgame, was released in 2008, followed in 2009 by the Wolsung: Magia Wieku Pary roleplaying game; the latter was released in English in 2012 as the Wolsung Steam Pulp Fantasy.

== Setting ==
Wolsung presents a world that blends nineteenth-century inspirations with fantastical races, magic, and advanced steam-based technology. Common elements of the setting include steam-powered vehicles, difference engines, golem robots, flying creatures used as transportation. The setting draws heavily on recognizable historical and pop-cultural analogues, creating a world that is immediately accessible to players familiar with European history and adventure fiction (for example, the country of Morgowia is heavily inspired by Imperial Russia).

The setting places particular emphasis on spectacle, public reputation, and social conflict alongside physical danger.

== Media and reception ==
=== Board game ===
Wolsung: The Boardgame
- Designers: Artur Ganszyniec; Maciej Sabat; Maciej Zasowski; Michał Stachyra
- Publishers: Kuźnia Gier (2008)
- Players: 2-4
- Playing time: 30 minutes
- Age range: 12+

Wolsung: The Boardgame released in 2008. was the first media published in the Wolsung universe. It was developed by Artur Ganszyniec, Maciej Sabat, Maciej Zasowski and Michał Stachyra, and published by Kuźnia Gier. It is a standalone Euro-style economic board game for 2–4 players set in the same fictional universe. In the game, players take the role of inventors who compete constructing machines and managing resources.

The board game received mixed assessments. Krzysztof Księski who reviewed it for Paradoks assessed it at 5/6; Oskar Usarek reviewing it for Polter, gave it 6.5/10. Marcin Zawiślak reviewing it for Rebel Times gave it a score of 8/10.

Reviewers praised the game for production quality and visual design but had reservations regarding gameplay length and repetition. They noted that while the board game shares visual and thematic elements with the role-playing setting, its mechanics are largely abstract and typical of the Eurogame genre, with limited direct integration of narrative elements from the RPG.

=== Roleplaying game ===
Wolsung
- Designers: Artur Ganszyniec; Maciej Sabat
- Publishers: Kuźnia Gier
- Publication: 2009; 17 years ago
- Genres: fantasy, steampunk
- Systems: Wolsung
- Website: wolsung.org

Developed by Artur Ganszyniec and Maciej Sabat, Wolsung RPG - Wolsung: Magia Wieku Pary (lit. Wolsung: The Magic of the Steam Age) was published in late 2009 Polish by Kuźnia Gier after a prolonged development period that contributed to its reputation within the Polish role-playing community, as rumours about the system development have circulated in it for years, with one reviewer calling it "legendary" for years before it was even released. The core rulebook was released as a substantial volume, containing extensive setting material, rules, and ready-to-use adventure frameworks.

The Wolsung role-playing system is designed to support fast-paced, cinematic play and storytelling rather than detailed tactical simulation. The rules use dice, cards, and tokens to resolve conflicts, with mechanics that encourage dramatic twists and negotiated stakes rather than attritional combat.

Conflicts are divided into several broad categories, including physical combat, chases, and verbal or social confrontations. Social encounters and reputation play a significant mechanical and narrative role within the game, with player characters portrayed as exceptional individuals whose exploits attract public attention and shape the course of events within the setting.

The reviews of the game were generally positive. Olek Ryłko who reviewed it for Polter assessed it at 7.5/10; another anonymous reviewer at that site gave it a score of 7/10. Jakub Nowosad in his review for Paradoks gave it a score of 8/10. Mateusz Nowak reviewing it for Rebel Times gave it a score of 4/5. Miłosz Cybowski who reviewed it for Esensja called it one of the best role-playing games of the recent years.

Reviewers highlighted the book’s emphasis on providing guidance for game masters, including numerous plot hooks and structured campaign outlines. Regarding the system, they positively opined on the richness of its setting and the abundance of adventure ideas included in the core book, and praised the game’s support for cinematic storytelling and its clear guidance on how to run adventures within its genre conventions. Criticism focused on the setting’s heavy reliance on recognizable real-world analogues and the relative lack of entirely novel concepts when compared to other steampunk or pulp-inspired role-playing games.

In 2011, the game's translation to English was announced. The game was released in English in 2012 as Wolsung Steam Pulp Fantasy (co-published by Kuźnia Gier and Studio 2 Publishing); in 2013 it was nominated for ENNIE Awards in the Best Writing category. Wolsung's release in English was described by the designers as a first in the context of a large Polish RPG system being released in that language; however, several other Polish-designed RPG products have been published in English before, including De Profundis (in two editions: 2001 and 2010).

The game has released several expansions and sourcebooks:

- Wolsung: Operacja Wotan (2009). Reviews: Polter, Esensja, Rebel Times #29
- Wolsung: Lyonesse: Miasto, Mgła, Maszyna (2010). Reviews: Polter, Esensja, Rebel Times #59
- Wolsung: W pustyni i w puszczy (2010). Reviews: Polter, Esensja, Rebel Times #61
- Wolsung: Almanach Nadzwyczajny (2011). Reviews: Polter, Rebel Times #66
- Wolsung: Slawia, Rzeczpospolita Przeklęta (2013). Reviews: Polter
- Wolsung: Dzień, w którym zatonęła Urda (2016). Reviews: Polter

In 2013, revised core rulebook (1.5) was released. In 2022, edition 2.0, Wolsung: Nowy Wspaniały Wiek (lit: Wolsung: New Wonderful Age), developed by Artur Ganszyniec, was published digitally.

=== Miniature game ===
The third product in the Wolsung line was a 28 mm skirmish miniature wargame, designed by Wojciech Chroboczynski, Jan Cieslicki and Łukasz Perzanowski, and published in 2011 by Micro Art Studios.

=== Fiction ===
The Wolsung universe has been expanded through two short story anthologies published as the Wolsung: Antologia series, both published in 2015. Reviews of the first and second volumes describe them as collections of standalone stories set within the game world, intended to explore different aspects of the setting rather than form a single continuous narrative. Critics emphasized the diversity of styles and themes across the anthologies, noting that they function primarily as world-building supplements rather than adaptations of specific role-playing scenarios. Story "Simon" by Marcin Sergiusz Przybyłek from the second volume was nominated for the Janusz A. Zajdel Award (the most prestigious fantastika award in Poland). Other writers who contributed stories to the anthologies include Paweł Majka, Marcin Przybyłek and Jakub Ćwiek.

== See also ==
- Polish role-playing games
