= Wilcza zamieć =

Fantasy short story by Jarosław Grzędowicz

- Author: Jarosław Grzędowicz
- Language: Polish
- Genre: fantasy
- Publisher: Fabryka Słów
- Publication date: 2005, 2008
- Publication place: Poland

Wilcza zamieć (The Wolf Storm) is a fantasy short story by Jarosław Grzędowicz from 2005. It won the Janusz A. Zajdel Awards. It was first published in the anthology Deszcze niespokojne (The Restless Rains). Three years later, in 2008, it appeared in the collection Wypychacz zwierząt (The Taxidermist). Its content references Norse mythology and World War II.

== Plot ==
Wilcza zamieć combines elements of Norse mythology and Kriegsmarine within the context of Nazi occultism; it is a story about a German submarine at the end of World War II that is tasked with establishing contact with the Scandinavian afterlife.

== Reception and analysis ==
The story was well-received by critics. Adam Florczyk, writing for the portal Paradoks, praised it for its excellent combination of seemingly incongruous elements – the blend of realistic depiction of life on a submarine, the psychological portrayal of a demoralized German crew, contrasted with the humorous depiction of Norse gods, creates a stunning effect. Agnieszka Szady, writing for the zine Esensja, lauded the main character (the author has a talent for creating male characters... with realistic behaviors and motivations that engage the reader fully), the construction of the story (the writer skillfully builds tension and gradually reveals the secrets of the plot), and the background (an extraordinarily vivid, almost cinematic depiction of life and combat on a submarine). In the same zine, Jakub Gałka appreciated the "Lovecraftian" mood, characters, plot, well-used technical jargon, and reflections on attitudes towards war, though he criticized the poorly resolved ending, considering the story a weaker version of David Brin’s Thor Meets Captain America. Jan Bodakowski, writing for the portal Salon24.pl, noted references to the comic Thorgal. Bartosz Szczyżański for Polter.pl called it surprising and fascinating, also noting the perfect preparation of the writer in terms of naval knowledge, military details, and mythology. Michał Sołtysiak, also writing for Polter.pl, described it as a well-crafted war story and a masterpiece. Robert Ziębiński in Newsweek Polska considered it an engaging, fantastic variation on the famous 'Das Boot' by Lothar-Günther Buchheim.

Years later, in 2021, Maciej Parowski praised Wilcza zamieć, noting that it is a story with a strong atmosphere, where the nautical layer impressed with its expertise, and the mythological layer was frightening.
