= Rafał Dębski =

Polish writer

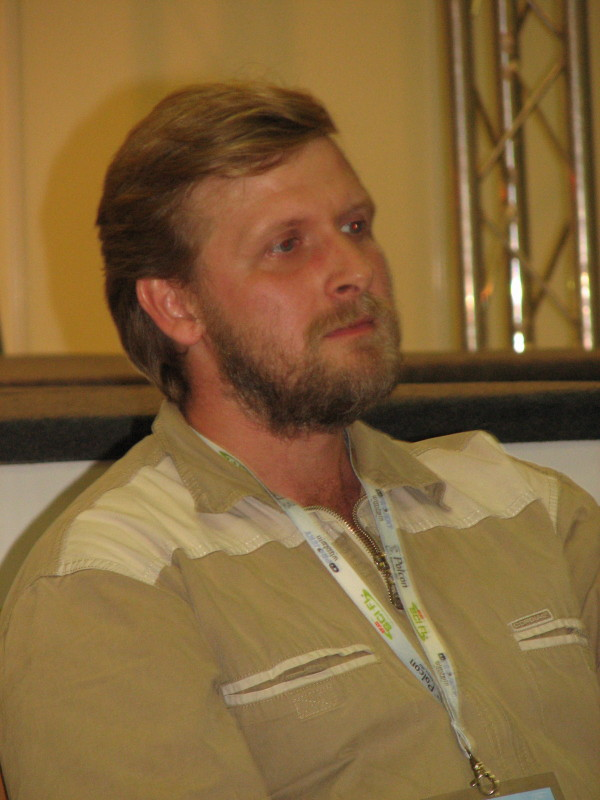

Rafał Dębski (born 1969) is a Polish writer of fantasy, historic, sensational and criminal novels. He works as a psychologist. Since June 2009 he has been editor in chief of the Science Fiction, Fantasy and Horror magazine.

He debuted in Nowa Fantastyka in its May 1998 issue with his tale "Siódmy liść".

In 2005 his first novel Łzy Nemezis was published. In the scope of fantasy literature he won the "Nautilus" award in 2007 for his novel Czarny Pergamin and in 2008 for Gwiazdozbiór kata. He published a series of criminal novels, in which the main character is police officer Michał Wroński. He also wrote a novel which takes place during the Russo-Chechen conflict.

== Bibliography ==
=== Books ===
- Łzy Nemesis, Copernicus Corporation, October 2005 (ISBN 83-86758-67-8)
- Czarny Pergamin, Fabryka Słów, October 2006 (ISBN 83-60505-12-8)
- Przy końcu drogi, Fantasmagoricon, October 2006 (ISBN 83-86758-68-6)
- Gwiazdozbiór kata, Wydawnictwo Dolnośląskie, May 2007 (ISBN 978-83-7384-643-2)
- Kiedy Bóg zasypia, Fabryka Słów, June 2007 (ISBN 978-83-60505-43-4)
- Pasterz upiorów, zbiór opowiadań, Fantasmagoricon, November 2007 (ISBN 978-83-925540-5-9)
- Wilki i Orły, Red Horse, February 2008 (ISBN 978-83-60504-45-1)
- Słońce we krwi, Red Horse, October 2008 (ISBN 978-83-60504-66-6)
- Serce teściowej, zbiór opowiadań, Fabryka Słów, November 2008 (ISBN 978-83-7574-018-9)
- Wilkozacy. Wilcze Prawo
- Wilkozacy. Krew z krwi

=== Series about police officer Wroński ===
- Labirynt von Brauna, Wydawnictwo Dolnośląskie, February 2007 (ISBN 978-83-7384-618-0)
- Żelazne kamienie, Wydawnictwo Dolnośląskie, September 2007 (ISBN 978-83-245-8522-9)
- Krzyże na rozstajach, Wydawnictwo Dolnośląskie, September 2008 (ISBN 978-83-245-8649-3)
