= Marcin Przybyłek =

Polish science-fiction writer

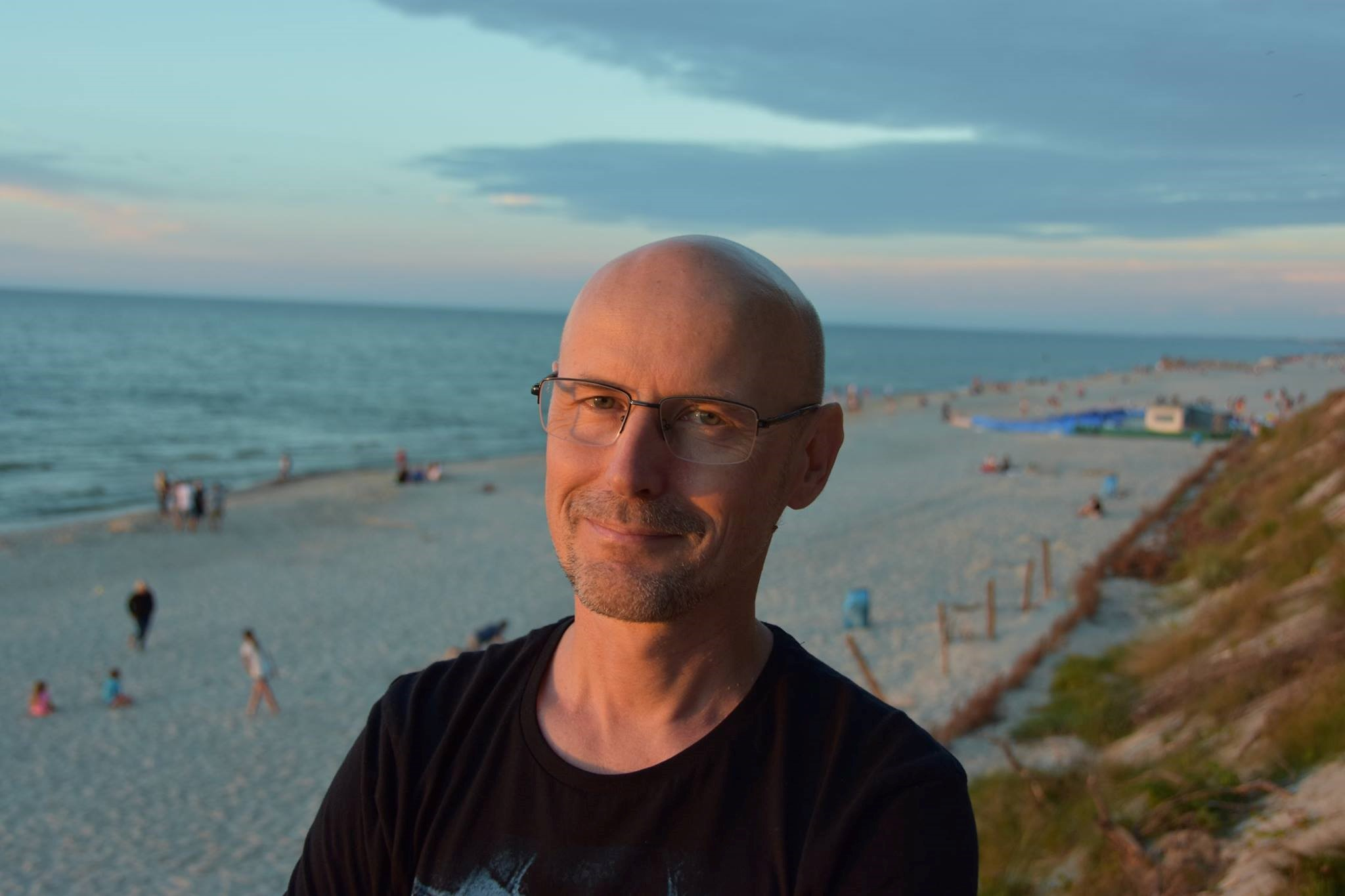
- Born: December 14, 1968 (age 57); Pułtusk
- Education: Medical University of Warsaw
- Notable work: Gamedec Saga
- Style: Science fiction
- Website: http://marcinprzybylek.pl/

Marcin Sergiusz Przybyłek (born December 14, 1968, in Pułtusk) is a Polish science fiction author, business trainer, coach, computer games designer and consultant, a medical doctor by education.

== Life ==
Marcin Przybyłek graduated from the Medical University of Warsaw. During his studies, he was a trainer at the Students' School of Mental Hygiene, a founding member of the Association for Active Personality Development, a participant in the Platonic Seminar and a lecturer at the Student Mental Hygiene Association. After obtaining a medical diploma, he worked for 6 years in the KRKA pharmaceutical concern, he later founded the training company Hekson, conducting trainings on personality development, creative thinking, leadership and management. Since 2017, he has been working closely with Anshar Studios, with which he creates the GAMEDEC computer game, based on his books. In 2018, he began to play in the "19+" series.

== Writings ==
Initially, he wrote texts in the field of psychology, including analyzes on male psychology, included in two books published by STAKROOS. He made his literary debut in June 2000 in the „Świat Gier Komputerowych” magazine, creating the column Grao Story. „Nowa Fantastyka” published his journalistic series and in November 2002 his first short story from the Gamedec series.

=== GAMEDEC Saga ===
Short story collection Gamedec. Granica rzeczywistości was his book debut published by superNOWA in 2004. It describes the adventures of gamedec Torkil Aymore. Gamedec is short for 'game detective' and this word was patented in 2017 by the European Union Intellectual Property Office.

The second volume of the story, Gamedec. Sprzedawcy lokomotyw was published in 2006.

The third part was originally divided into two volumes: Gamedec. Zabaweczki. Błyski and Gamedec. Zabaweczki. Sztorm, which were published by superNowa in 2008 and 2010 respectively.

In 2012, the fourth part of the saga was published by Fabryka Słów in two volumes: Gamedec. Czas silnych istot, ks.1 and Gamedec. Czas silnych istot, ks.2.

The last two volumes of the fifth part of the saga: Gamedec. Obrazki z imperium. Część 1 and Gamedec. Obrazki z imperium. Część 2 were published in 2015 by the "REBIS" Publishing House.

In 2016–2019, the REBIS publishing house resumed the release of all the first four parts of the Gamedec saga, which were revised and expanded. Parts 3 and 4 have been published as single volumes this time.

The genre of "Gamedec" evolves from crime fiction kept in the climate of cyberpunk and noir, through military fantasy, to space opera and utopia. The action begins in 2196 and ends around 2522. The series deals with transhumanist, psychological and sociological issues, describing the transformation of the individual and societies immersed in accelerated technological development.

=== Orzeł Biały Dylogy ===
Orzeł Biały and Orzeł Biały 2 are post-apocalyptic, jocular novels. Characters are real people who volunteered during the recruitment announced by the author, presented their ideas and suggested character traits. It also features famous people from the fandom and Polish science fiction writers.

== The Gamedec universe ==
Marcin Sergiusz Przybyłek invites artists of various fields to jointly create the Gamedec universe (Gamedecverse). The works of Marcin Jakubowski, Marek Okoń, Tomasz Maroński, which are a visualization of the world created by Przybyłek, have gained recognition from experts all over the world (published in "Digital Art Masters" and "Expo", among others). The result of cooperation with animators and graphic designers is a spot advertising books about Torkil Aymor. Composer Robert Letkiewicz has composed numerous pieces devoted to the saga, which he included in the albums "Gamedecverse", "Spaceport" and "Nigredo". Musician, keyboardist of the Votum band, Zbigniew Szatkowski, created the album "Morning Over Warsaw City".

=== Gamedec board game ===
Gamedec board game was published in 2013 by CDP.pl as a joint project of Marcin Przybyłek and Jan Madejski. Gamedec is an adventure game, players take on the roles of gamedecs, detectives operating both in the real world (realium) and virtual (sensory) worlds.

=== Gamedec computer game ===
Anshar Studios from Katowice has been working on creating a computer version of Gamedec since 2017. It is a single-player non-combat cyberpunk isometric RPG, planned to be released in 2021. The author of the saga actively participates in the process of its creation as a designer and consultant for the game world, he is also one of the scriptwriters, writes dialogues and interactions. The game has won numerous awards and nominations, including „Game of the Show" award on Gamescom 2019 and 1st place at the Devcom Indie Awards 2020.

== Fandom activity ==
Przybyłek is strongly associated with the fandom and often visits Polish fan conventions. He conducts lectures, workshops and participates in discussion panels. His interests are focused on the psychological, technological and humanistic aspects of human development.

In 2019, he was honored with the Skierka Prize, awarded since 2017 to writers who have been particularly appreciated by the organizers of the SkierCon convention held in Skierniewice.

Przybyłek's fans have been building a tactical area related to his novels at the Pyrkon fan convention.

== Nonliterary interests ==
=== Musical ===
Przybyłek wrote works devoted to contemporary music, incl. creations by professor Marian Borkowski "Muzyka Profesora Mariana Borkowskiego. Homeryckie dźwięki" in "Ekspresja Formy - Ekspresja Treści", ed. AM im. F. Chopina.

He used to compose electronic music - he won the first prize in the composition competition "Warsztaty muzyczne - ulica Francuska'97".

=== Painting ===
Przybyłek learned painting under the supervision of his father, a painter. He published graphics in the quarterly magazine "Albo - albo. Inspiracje jungowskie".

=== Psychology and business ===
As a business trainer, he consults on topics related to the psychological aspects of managing an organization in „Puls Biznesu".

== List of works ==
=== Books ===
- Postacie mężczyzn. Homer, Tolkien (STAKROOS 1995)
- Ojciec i syn czyli gwiezdne wojny (Nowa nadzieja – narodziny autonomii) (STAKROOS 1997)
- Gamedec. Granica rzeczywistości (superNowa 2004)
- Gamedec. Sprzedawcy lokomotyw (superNowa 2006)
- Sprzedaż albo śmierć. Antyporadnik (Olszewski & Kunikowski 2007)
- Gamedec. Zabaweczki. Błyski (superNowa 2008)
- Gamedec. Zabaweczki. Sztorm (superNowa 2010)
- Gamedec. Czas silnych istot, ks.1 (Fabryka Słów 2012)
- Gamedec. Czas silnych istot, ks.2 (Fabryka Słów 2012)
- CEO Slayer (REBIS 2014)
- Gamedec. Obrazki z imperium. Część 1 (REBIS 2015), nominated to Janusz A. Zajdel Award
- Gamedec. Obrazki z imperium. Część 2 (REBIS 2015)
- Gamedec. Granica rzeczywistości (REBIS 2016)
- Orzeł Biały (REBIS 2016)
- Orzeł Biały 2 (REBIS 2017)
- Gamedec. Sprzedawcy lokomotyw (REBIS 2017)
- Gamedec. Zabaweczki (REBIS 2018)
- Gamedec. Czas silnych istot (REBIS 2019)
- Symfonia życia (Wydawnictwo IX 2019)

=== Short stories ===
- Małpia pułapka („Nowa Fantastyka” 11/2002, zbiór Gamedec. Granica rzeczywistości, superNowa 2004, REBIS 2016)
- Zawodowiec („Nowa Fantastyka” 3/2003, zbiór Gamedec. Granica rzeczywistości, superNowa 2004, REBIS 2016)
- Syndrom Adelheima („Nowa Fantastyka” 7/2003, zbiór Gamedec. Granica rzeczywistości, superNowa 2004, REBIS 2016)
- Polowanie („Nowa Fantastyka” 9/2003, zbiór Gamedec. Granica rzeczywistości, superNowa 2004, REBIS 2016)
- Granica rzeczywistości („Nowa Fantastyka” 3/2004, zbiór Gamedec. Granica rzeczywistości, superNowa 2004, REBIS 2016)
- Błędne koło (zbiór Gamedec. Granica rzeczywistości, superNowa 2004, REBIS 2016)
- Rajska Plaża (zbiór Gamedec. Granica rzeczywistości, superNowa 2004, REBIS 2016)
- Finta (zbiór Gamedec. Granica rzeczywistości, superNowa 2004, REBIS 2016)
- Flashback (zbiór Gamedec. Granica rzeczywistości, superNowa 2004, REBIS 2016)
- 3 listopada (zbiór Gamedec. Granica rzeczywistości, superNowa 2004, REBIS 2016)
- Mrok (zbiór Gamedec. Granica rzeczywistości, superNowa 2004, REBIS 2016)
- Anna (zbiór Gamedec. Granica rzeczywistości, superNowa 2004, REBIS 2016)
- Ringerer („Nowa Fantastyka” 10/2004)
- Prośba („Nowa Fantastyka – wydanie specjalne” lato 2007, zbiór Gamedec. Granica rzeczywistości, REBIS 2016)
- Infigen („Science Fiction Fantasy i Horror” nr 29 marca 2008)
- Aquilla, Aguilla (antologia Jedenaście pazurów, superNowa 2010)
- Wymiar wewnętrzny (antologia Science fiction, Powergraph 2011)
- Żołnierz (Coś na progu nr 7, 2013, zbiór Gamedec. Granica rzeczywistości, REBIS 2016)
- Mała May (antologia Pożądanie, Powergraph 2013)
- Powrót do domu (zbiór opowiadań I żywy stąd nie wyjdzie nikt, Fabryka Słów 2014)
- Simon (antologia Wolsung, tom II, Van Der Book 2015), nominated to Janusz A. Zajdel Award
- Future Fame (zbiór opowiadań Na nocnej zmianie. Pióra Falkonu, Fabryka Słów 2016)
- Platforma („Fantom” nr 2, 2017)

=== Online short stories ===
- Wywiad (Obcy w Polsce, available at obcy.gadżetomania.pl)

=== Audiobooks ===
- Gamedec. Granica rzeczywistości, czyta Marcin Przybyłek (2014)
- Gamedec. Sprzedawcy lokomotyw, czyta Marcin Popczyński (2015)
- Sprzedaż albo śmierć. Antyporadnik, czyta Marcin Popczyński (2015)
- Gamedec. Zabaweczki. Błyski, czyta Marcin Popczyński (2015)
- Gamedec. Zabaweczki. Sztorm, czyta Marcin Popczyński (2015)
- Gamedec. Czas silnych istot, ks.1, czyta Marcin Popczyński (2015)
- Gamedec. Czas silnych istot, ks.2, czyta Marcin Popczyński (2015)
- Kalina i Kaj. Książka teoretycznie dla dzieci, czyta Marcin Popczyński (2015)
- CEO Slayer. Pogromca prezesów, czyta Roch Siemianowski (2015)
- Grao Story. The book, czyta Marcin Popczyński (2015)
- Gamedec. Obrazki z imperium. Część 1, czyta Marcin Popczyński (2016)
- Gamedec. Obrazki z imperium. Część 2, czyta Marcin Popczyński (2016)
- Orzeł Biały, czyta Wojciech Masiak (2017)
- Orzeł Biały 2, czyta Wojciech Masiak (2018)
- Gamedec. Granica rzeczywistości, czyta Wojciech Masiak (2019)
- Symfonia Życia, czyta Wojciech Masiak (2020)

=== Translations ===
- Gamedek. Hranice Reality (translated by Pavel Weigel, 2008)
- Gamedek. Prodavaci Lokomotiv (translated by Pavel Weigel, 2008)

=== Articles ===
- Co w duszy gra („Nowa Fantastyka” – from 01/2002 to 08/2002)
- Szaleństwa twórcze czyli twórcze szaleństwo („Nowa Fantastyka” 10/2004)
- Wirtualna śmierć („Czas Fantastyki" 02/2005)
- Rzeczy Oczy Wiste („Nowa Fantastyka” 07/2007)
- Business future („Czas Fantastyki" 02/2008)

== Bibliography ==
- Światy Polskiej Fantastyski Wojciech Sedeńko, Fundacja Pro Fantastica 2016, ISBN 978-83-65035-00-4
- Światotwórstwo w fantastyce. Krzysztof M.Maj, Universitas 2019, ISBN 97883-242-3613-8
- Wasz cyrk, moje małpy. Chronologiczny alfabet moich autorów. Tom 2. Maciej Parowski, Sine Qua Non 2019, ISBN 978-83-8129-632-8
