= Wanderlust Travel Stories =

2019 video game

- Developer: Different Tales
- Publisher: Walkabout Games
- Director: Jacek Brzeziński
- Writer: Artur Ganszyniec
- Platforms: Microsoft Windows; macOS; iOS; Nintendo Switch
- Release: 26 September 2019
- Genre: Text adventure
- Mode: Single-player

Wanderlust Travel Stories is a 2019 indie text-based adventure game developed by Different Tales and published by Walkabout Games. It was released worldwide on Windows, iOS and macOS on 26 September 2019, and is available on Steam, GOG.com, App Store, Mac App Store and Nintendo Switch. A spinoff of the game, Wanderlust: Transsiberian, was released April 9, 2020.

== Development ==
The game was created by Polish designers Artur Ganszyniec and Jacek Brzeziński, both known for their work on The Witcher series of games. Ganszyniec has stated that Wanderlust represents "slow gaming", a trend in game design that values thinking and feeling over skills and reflexes.

== Premise and gameplay ==
The game features a text-based narrative, original photography and a soundtrack. It tells the story of four strangers who meet on a remote island and share their travel memories. The player reads their accounts and, by making choices, influences their actions, their mood and their money reserve. This, in turn, affects the way the world is perceived by the characters and presented, leading to different outcomes.
