= Księga jesiennych demonów =

Collection of horror short stories by Jarosław Grzędowicz

- Author: Jarosław Grzędowicz
- Language: Polish
- Genre: horror fiction
- Publisher: Fabryka Słów
- Publication date: 2003
- Publication place: Poland
- Media type: anthology of short stories

Księga jesiennych demonów (The Book of Autumn Demons) is a collection of horror short stories by Jarosław Grzędowicz, published by Fabryka Słów in 2003.

The volume consists of the following stories: Prolog (Prologue), Klub Absolutnej Karty Kredytowej (The Club of Absolute Credit Card), Opowieść terapeuty (The Therapist’s Tale), Wiedźma i wilk (The Witch and the Wolf), Piorun (Lightning), Czarne motyle (Black Butterflies), and Epilog (Epilogue). The stories are set in contemporary Poland, and their common theme is variations on what happens when magic, which seems to promise to solve people's problems, enters everyday life, revealing the hidden price that must be paid.

This was Grzędowicz’s first collection of short stories and his debut book. The book received favorable reviews from critics.

== History of editions ==
The collection was first published by Fabryka Słów in October 2003; it has been reissued in 2007, 2010, 2014, and 2024.

Klub Absolutnej Karty Kredytowej was first published online in issue 3 of the e-zine Fahrenheit at the turn of 1997 and 1998; it was also nominated for the Elektrybałt Award from that zine. It was later included in the anthology Wizje alternatywne #4 (Alternative Visions #4) (Solaris 2002).

== Plot ==
In Prolog, Jacek Wolecki, a man whose life has just fallen apart (having lost his job, home, and girlfriend), visits a shop selling magical items run by a "city shaman". There, the shopkeeper tells him about people who have encountered supernatural forces – gaining wealth, love, and abilities through magic, but always having to pay a hidden price.

In Klub Absolutnej Karty Kredytowej, the main character has lost his job, is living with his wife and children at his parents' home, and embarks on a journey he can't afford, without a clear destination. Suddenly, he receives a magical credit card with seemingly no limit on its funds.

The protagonist of Opowieść terapeuty, a weary psychologist-psychotherapist, gains the power to heal his patients. The story also features a character representing God, depicted as a tired and amnesiac person.

Wiedźma i wilk presents a fantasy plot – the heroine, a witch, breaks up with a troublesome partner and tries to find – or create – a perfect partner, who turns out to be a werewolf. Unfortunately, the werewolf is uncomfortable in human form.

The main character in Piorun is a geneticist who suspects his wife of infidelity; while tracking her, he meets another woman, with whom he falls in love. Meanwhile, in the town where he lives, many people also encounter their ideal partners and then disappear without a trace.

In Czarne motyle, a widow living in the countryside reminisces about her husband, and unexpectedly a new, intriguing man enters her life. The narrative is partially conveyed through the spirit of the widow’s husband.

Epilog serves as the conclusion to Prolog.

== Reception and analysis ==
In 2003, the book was positively reviewed by a critic using the pseudonym pz for Notes Wydawniczy. The critic wrote that the texts deserve attention and that the collection is certainly worth reading. The author was praised for successfully building tension and atmosphere, and creating a suggestive atmosphere that inspires real fear, as well as for placing the stories in a contemporary reality.

Also in 2003, the anthology was reviewed by Janusz A. Urbanowicz for Esensja. The story Wiedźma i wilk was deemed postfeminist. The overarching theme of the stories in the collection was seen as loss, and the characters were described as losers – people who are eternally losing something in life. The collection was praised for its well-developed characters’ psychology and good descriptions, as well as the author’s literary craft; however, three stories were criticized as heavily inspired by other works. The collection was compared to The Shining by Stephen King, where horror arises less from supernatural elements and more from ordinary reality and human relationships.

In the same year, Agnieszka Kawula reviewed the book for the Poltergeist portal. The book was rated very positively (9.5/10), regarded as a great horror novel and simultaneously a psychological novel, as well as a metaphor for human fears and anxieties. According to the reviewer, Grzędowicz has mastered literary craft very well and skillfully combined King-like horror with Poe-like darkness. The use of various narrative styles (first, second, and third person) was noted as effective. The amazing atmosphere of the book was praised, and it was stated that the horror emanates from each story, with each tale being carefully planned and thought out. The reviewer also positively assessed the illustrations by Magdalena Miszczak.

In 2006, Tymoteusz Wronka reviewed the anthology for the Katedra portal. He considered Czarne motyle to be the best story in the collection. The story Klub Absolutnej Karty Kredytowej was seen as illustrating the saying money is not everything. The anthology was rated slightly above average (6/10), with the reviewer noting that all the stories, except the last one, were read without much emotion and that the stories’ plots do not stand up on their own.

In 2007, Daniel Elkader reviewed the book again for Katedra, rating it 7/10. The reviewer praised the author’s style: his prose is light and proficient... builds atmosphere very suggestively, and manages the action effectively. Grzędowicz was compared to Jacek Piekara. The created atmosphere of horror, which manifests through the tragedy of realistic life situations, was also commended. However, the lack of logical connections between stories and their weak link to the book’s title were criticized; many stories were noted to have weak endings. The book was summarized as good, but not exceptional.

Also in 2007, the book received a second review in Esensja, this time by Radosław Scheller. The book was praised for its artful and enchanting language and deemed worthy of recommendation, although it was noted as a pessimistic read. Grzędowicz’s prose was compared to Stephen King’s, with the comment that he builds horror masterfully... not with gallons of blood or nauseating murders, but with mundane everyday life. The weakest story in the collection was deemed Czarne motyle, which the reviewer felt verged on monotony, if not boredom.

Later that same year, Bartosz Szczyżański reviewed the book again for Poltergeist. The reviewer praised the graphic design of the second edition (considering the first edition’s cover terrible), as well as the language (fast, energetic), descriptions, and dialogues (perfectly balanced). The book was seen as a revelation and rated 9/10. A year later, in a review of another Grzędowicz collection, the reviewer reaffirmed his opinion, writing that Księga completely dazzled me – such strong, emotion-filled works had never been seen in Polish fantasy.

In 2009, Esensja reviewers included the book in the 10 best Polish short story collections. Almost all the stories (except Epilog/Prolog) were included in the ranking of the 100 best short stories in Polish fantasy. The anthology was described as a collection of contemporary stories with added fantasy motifs... exceptionally coherent... atmospheric... interesting [and] moving. The book was also included in the 50 books of the past decade worth knowing.

For the Paradoks portal, Ewelina Flis reviewed the book in 2014. She praised the book’s quality of production (binding, paper, illustrations) and the stories as pleasant to read. According to the reviewer, Grzędowicz presents worn-out schemes in surprising ways, although the endings of some stories are easy to predict.
