= Gamedec =

2021 video game

- Developer: Anshar Studios
- Publisher: Anshar Publishing
- Engine: Unreal Engine
- Platforms: Windows, Nintendo Switch, PlayStation 5
- Release: Windows; September 16, 2021; Nintendo Switch; July 1, 2022; PlayStation 5 February 23, 2023
- Genres: Adventure, role-playing
- Mode: Single-player

Gamedec is a point-and-click adventure role-playing video game developed by Anshar Studios and published by Anshar Publishing. It was released for Windows on September 16, 2021, followed by Nintendo Switch on July 1, 2022 and PlayStation 5 on February 23, 2023. The game takes place in Warsaw and features a cyberpunk universe and themes of film noir, tech noir, and transhumanism. The player controls a "game detective" or "gamedec" and participate in solving mysteries related to virtual-reality games, collecting clues and making deductions in order to drive the story forward.

== Gameplay ==
Gamedec features a protagonist with customizable appearance and background. The player may choose from a variety of starting personalities which influence their beginning number of points in each of the game's four personality categories. These points, earnable through dialogue choices, may be spent on skill tree nodes which will enable new dialogue options when interacting with the game's characters and various scripted events. Dialogue choices are permanent, as are "deductions", which are a core element of the game's progression system – players are presented with irreversible choices based on optional evidence, where the number of choices is fixed for each deduction, but the choices' availability is determined by progression. In this system it is possible for a player to select an answer without having examined the entire field of clues or unlocking every answer available, yet the story will continue regardless.

== Plot ==
The game is based on a collection of short stories by Polish science-fiction author Marcin Przybyłek, which portray the adventures of a "gamedec"—short for "game detective"—a private detective tasked with solving mysteries related to a variety of full sensory immersive virtual reality games.

== Reception ==
Reception

Aggregate score
Aggregator	Score
Metacritic	PC: 72/100; NS: 69/100

Review scores
Publication	Score
Nintendo Life	7/10
PC Gamer (US)	58/100
RPGamer	3.0/5
RPGFan	83/100
Shacknews	8/10
TouchArcade	3.5/5
Tom's Guide	4/5

Gamedec received "mixed or average" reviews according to review aggregator Metacritic. PC Gamer described it as "A cybersleuth RPG that wastes its great premise.", citing bugs and "inconsistencies" as part of the criticism, and Rock Paper Shotgun noted that the translation and in-universe terminology can make the dialogue difficult to process at times. Tom's Guide called it "… a fun and engaging decision-driven RPG", hailing its positive aspects as being "decisions that matter", "beautiful art design" and "plenty of replayability".
