= Felix, Net i Nika =

Book series by Rafał Kosik

Felix, Net i Nika ("Felix, Net and Nika") is a series of Polish language science fiction books for teenagers, written by Rafał Kosik.

It tells the adventures of three friends - Felix Polon, Net Bielecki and Nika Mickiewicz - who attend fictional Professor Kuszmiński Middle School in Warsaw. As of 2024, eighteen books have been published.

== Books ==
There are currently 18 books in the series:

- Felix, Net and Nika and the Gang of Invisible People - November 2004.
- Felix, Net and Nika and the Theoretically Possible Catastrophe - November 2005
- Felix, Net and Nika and the Palace of Dreams - November 2006
- Felix, Net and Nika and the Trap of Immortality - November 2007
- Felix, Net and Nika and the Orbital Conspiracy - November 2008
- Felix, Net and Nika and the Orbital Conspiracy 2: Small Army - May 2009
- Felix, Net and Nika and the Third Cousin - November 2009
- Felix, Net and Nika and the Rebellion of Machines - March 2011
- Felix, Net and Nika and the World Zero - November 2011
- Felix, Net and Nika and the World Zero 2. Alternauts - November 2012
- Felix, Net and Nika and the Extracurricular Stories - April 2013
- Felix, Net and Nika and the Secret of Czerwona Hańcza - November 2013
- Felix, Net and Nika and Curse of McKillian's House - November 2014
- Felix, Net and Nika and (un)Safe Growing up - November 2015
- Felix, Net and Nika and The End of The World as We Know It - November 2018
- Felix, Net and Nika and No Chance - November 2022
- Felix, Net and Nika and No Chance 2: other tomorrrow - 2023
- Felix, Net and Nika and Fantology - June 2024

== Film ==
A feature motion picture, Felix, Net i Nika oraz Teoretycznie Możliwa Katastrofa (Felix, Net and Nika and the Theoretically Possible Catastrophe) was released in Poland on September 28, 2012.

== Main characters ==
Felix Polon - a foresighted, fair-haired boy with dark brown eyes. He inherited the talent of constructing various things, especially robots, from his father- it saved his friends many times. He can make anything from nothing, always finds a way out of a situation; almost always has a plan. Together with his parents Marlene and Peter, grandmother Lucy, his dog Caban (a Black Russian Terrier) and Golem Golem a robot he built, Felix lives on Serdeczna Street in a small family house.

Net Bielecki is quite tall & slim, has blue eyes and a high IQ level. "Net" is his nickname; his true name is unknown. He is the most trendy and 'awesome' in his entire class. He is a human calculator and is excellent in mathematics. He hates dictations and spelling because he is dyslexic. He is also quite lazy, absent-minded and sometimes hysterical, or panicking. His dark blond hair looks like a heap of hay after a grenade explosion. He is best in ICT and writes many of his own programs. His love interest is Nika Mickiewicz. Together with his parents Lila and Mark, and their newborn twins nicknamed Pompek and Prumcia he lives on the top floor of a Penthouse apartment.

Nika Mickiewicz is a girl with a character. She is very brave and mature. She likes reading books. She has curly, red hair, green eyes and a few freckles. She is not very rich; she wears second-hand clothes and her only pair of black Dr. Martens shoes. She lives in a tiny apartment. She is an orphan, but hides that fact from people for almost 3 years. However, Felix and Net, her best and possibly only friends, find out about it. She also has abnormal abilities. She can move distant objects using her powers, ski uphill and knows some things by intuition. In other words, she is telekinetic.

Manfred is a friendly AI program started and never finished by Net's father, and mastered and programmed further by Net himself. He likes going on adventures and solving mysteries with the trio much more than his actual job, which is controlling the traffic lights. He helped out the three friends many times and is their reliable and faithful friend.

Morten is also an AI program, but he is the antagonist of the trio. He appears in all 6 books of Felix Net and Nika. In the first book, the trio thinks they finished him off for good, but as we find out later, he comes back in the third book. In the fifth/sixth book, he was the mastermind of the Orbital Conspiracy. Also, Morten's logo, appears in all 6 books and it is still a mystery what he has to do with each event.
