= Wojciech Świdziniewski =

Wojciech Świdziniewski (26 July 1975 – 17 September 2009) born in Białystok, is a Polish fantasy writer and columnist. His first short story, The Consecrated (Konsekrowany), was published in Fantastyka, Poland's leading fantasy literary magazine, in 1999. His another short stories were published in Polish magazine Science Fiction, ezine Fahrenheit and fanzine WIDOK z Wysokiego Zamku. His short story The Stone-Masons (Murarze) was nominated for Janusz A. Zajdel Award, in 2001. Świdziniewski died on 17 September 2009 about month before publishing his first fantasy novel Troubles in Hamdirholm (Kłopoty w Hamdirholm).
