= Wydawnictwo Dolnośląskie =

Wydawnictwo Dolnośląskie is a publishing company founded in 1986 with cooperation with Bertelsmann Media.
