= Rafał Kosik =

Polish writer (born 1971)

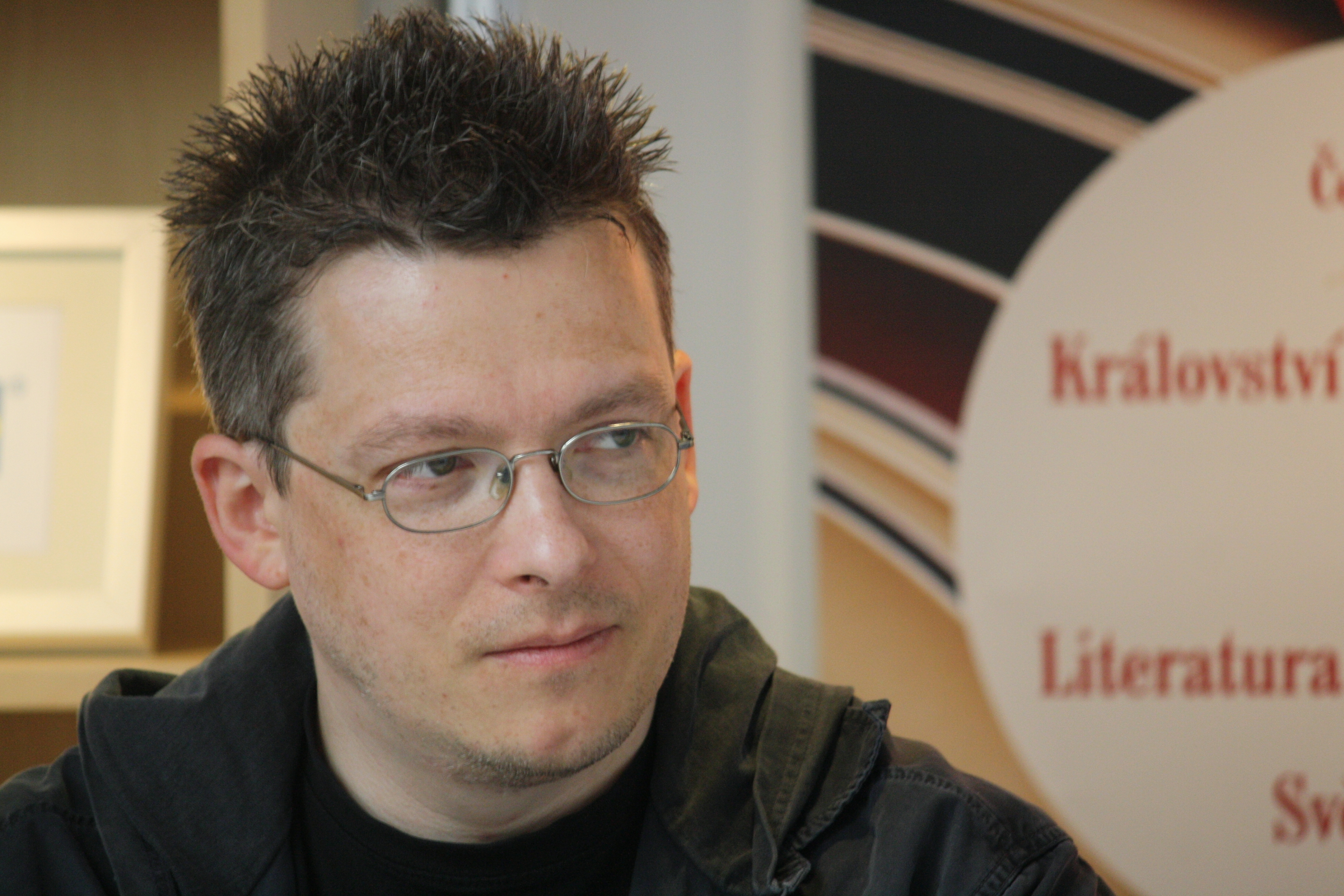
Rafał Kosik (2011)

Rafał Kosik (8 October 1971 in Warsaw, Poland) is a Polish science fiction writer.

A Polish-language film based on the series Felix, Net i Nika entitled Felix, Net i Nika oraz Teoretycznie Możliwa Katastrofa (Felix, Net, and Nika and Theoretically Possible Catastrophe) was released in Poland on 28 September 2012.

His 2008 novel Kameleon received the Janusz A. Zajdel Award and Jerzy Żuławski Literary Award. In 2018 he received the Janusz A. Zajdel Award for the novel Różaniec.

== Works ==
=== Standalone ===
- Mars (2003)
- Vertical (2006)
- Kameleon (2008)
- Różaniec (2017)
- Cyberpunk 2077: No Coincidence (2023)

=== Felix, Net and Nika ===
- Felix, Net and Nika and the Gang of Invisible People (2004)
- Felix, Net and Nika and the Theoretically Possible Catastrophe (2005)
- Felix, Net i Nika and the Palace of Dreams (2006)
- Felix, Net i Nika oraz Pułapka Nieśmiertelności (2007)
- Felix, Net i Nika oraz Orbitalny Spisek (2008)
- Felix, Net i Nika oraz Orbitalny Spisek 2: Mała Armia (2009)
- Felix, Net i Nika and Third Cousin (2009)
- Felix, Net i Nika oraz Bunt Maszyn (2011)
- Felix, Net i Nika and Zero World (2011)
- Felix, Net i Nika and Zero World 2. Alternauts (2012)
- Felix, Net i Nika and Extra-curricular Stories (2013)
- Felix, Net i Nika and Secret of Czerwona Hańcza (2013)
- Felix, Net i Nika and Curse of McKillian's House (2014)
- Felix, Net I Nika and (Un)safe Adolescence (2015)
- Felix, Net i Nika and the End of the World as We Know It (2018)
