= Witold Jabłoński =

Polish sinologist and professor

Witold Jabłoński (10 January 1901 – 7 July 1957) (Chinese name 夏伯龍) was a Polish sinologist, professor at the University of Warsaw.

Before the Second Sino-Japanese War, he was a professor at Tsinghua University. He made translations of Chinese classic works and modern Chinese literature. His nearly complete draft translation of Zhuangzi was burned in the Warsaw Uprising, but he published a translation in 1953. In 1955, he participated in discussions surrounding the Chinese Character Simplification Scheme. He died in Beijing in 1957.
