= Jakub Ćwiek =

Silesian author

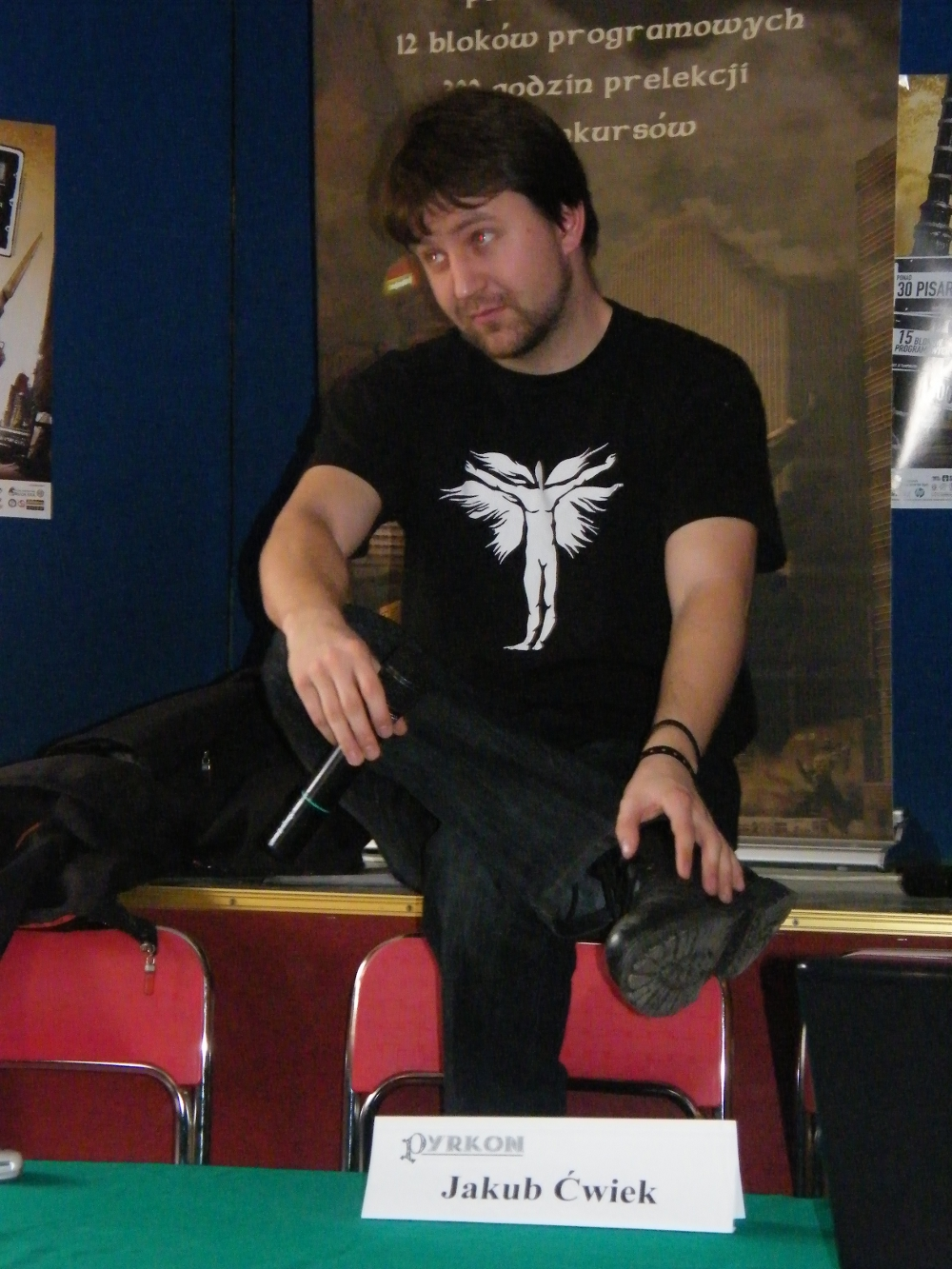
- Jakub during Pyrkon in 2009.
- Born: 24 June 1982 (age 43); Opole, Polish People's Republic
- Occupation: Writer
- Years active: 1989 - now
- Notable work: See: Bibliography

Jakub Ćwiek (born 24 June 1982 in Opole) is a Polish fantasy writer.

He debuted in 2005 with the short story collection Kłamca (transl. Liar). The short story Cicha noc (transl. Silent Night) contained in the book was nominated to the Janusz A. Zajdel Award.

== Bibliography ==
=== Short story collections ===
- Gotuj z papieżem. (2009)

=== Novels ===
- Liżąc ostrze. (2007)
- Ciemność płonie. (2008)
- Ofensywa szulerów. (2009)
- Krzyż Południa. Rozdroża. (2010)

==== Kłamca (The Liar) series ====
- Kłamca. (2005)
  - Anioł Stróż
  - Młot, wąż i skała
  - Samobójca
  - Krew Baranka
  - Cleaner
  - Przepowiednia
  - Galeria
  - Cicha noc
  - Egzorcysta
  - Głupiec na wzgórzu
- Kłamca 2. Bóg marnotrawny. (2006)
  - Okazja
  - Korona stworzenia
  - Odległość Anioła
  - Idźcie, jesteście posłani
  - Słudzy Metatrona
  - Bóg marnotrawny
- Kłamca 3. Ochłap sztandaru. (2008)
- Kłamca – audiobook by Krzysztof Banaszyk (2010)
- Kłamca 4. Kill'em all. (2012)
  - Część I: Wszyscy mają się dobrze
    - Rozdział 1-6
  - Część II: Ups... Już nie
    - Rozdział 7-10
  - Część III: Dokąd prowadzą wszystkie drogi
    - Rozdział 11-16
  - Część IV: Grand finale
    - Rozdział 17-18

== Awards ==
For the story Bajka o trybach i powrotach, Ćwiek received the award of Janusz A. Zajdel in the category of short story in 2011. The presentation of the statue took place at Polconia in Wrocław.

He was nominated for the award of Janusz A. Zajdel ten times:

- in 2015 for the novel Chłopcy 3: Zguba
- in 2012 for the novel: Kłamca 4: Kill 'Em All as well as the stories: Będziesz to prać!, Co było, a nie jest... i Kukuryku!
- in 2011 for the story: Bajka o trybach i powrotach (received the award)
- in 2010 for the novel: Krzyż Południa. Rozdroża and the story: Małpki z liści
- in 2006 for the story: Bóg marnotrawny
- In 2005 for the story: Cicha noc

Ćwiek was also nominated for Artist of the Year for Śląkfy for the year 2012.
