= Krzysztof Piskorski =

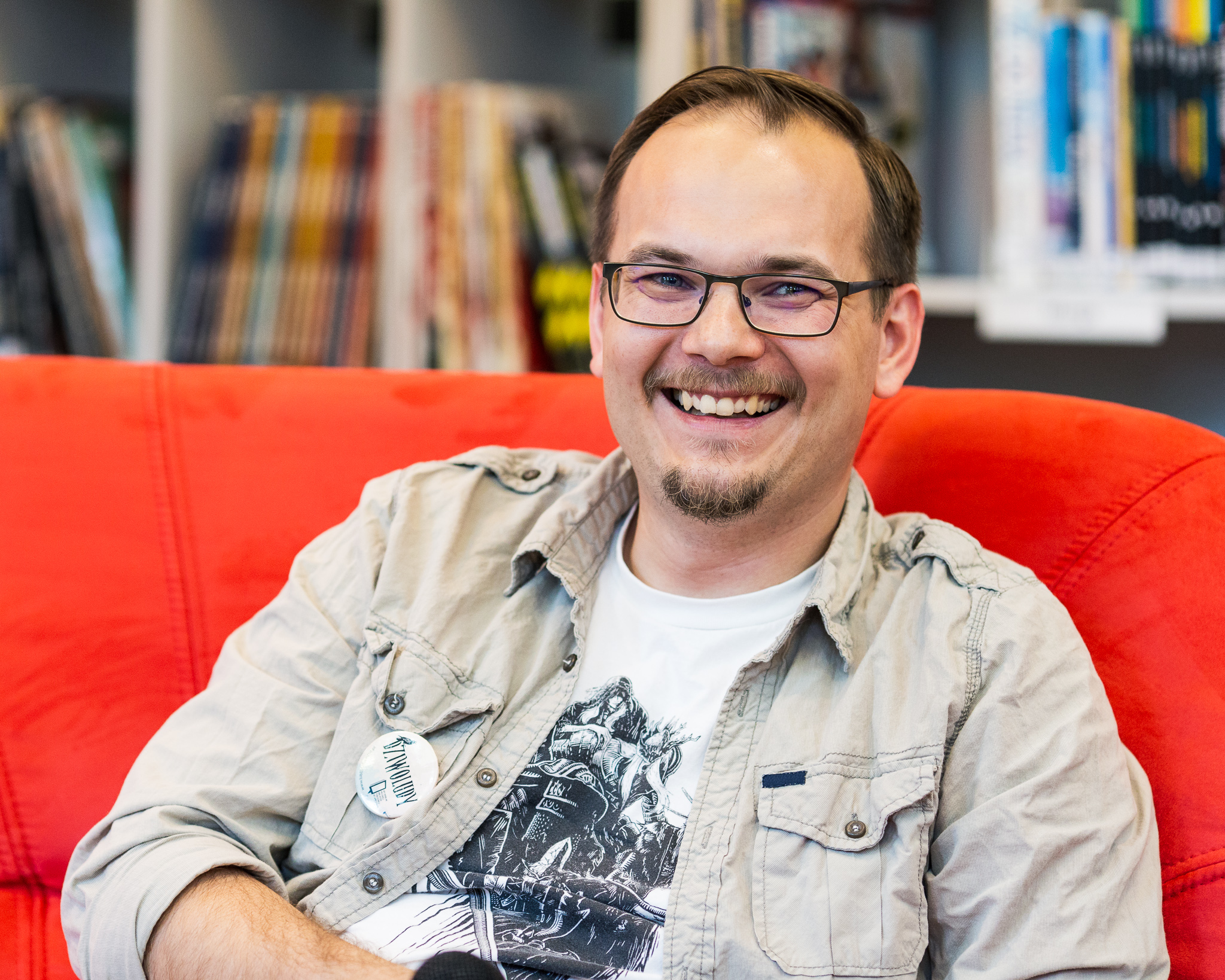
Krzysztof Piskorski in 2018

Krzysztof Piskorski (born 1982) is a Polish fantasy and science fiction writer. His books Cienioryt (2013) and Czterdzieści i cztery (2016) won the Janusz A. Zajdel Award. Piskorski has also worked in the board game industry, writing story elements and co-designing several board games by Polish game company Awaken Realms.

== Works ==
=== Books ===
- Wygnaniec (Runa 2005)
- Najemnik (Runa 2006)
- Prorok (Runa 2007)
- Poczet dziwów miejskich (Fabryka Słów 2007)
- Zadra, vol 1 (Runa 2008)
- Zadra, vol 2 (Runa 2009)
- Krawędź czasu (Runa 2011)
- Cienioryt (Wydawnictwo Literackie 2013)
- Czterdzieści i cztery Czterdzieści i cztery (Wydawnictwo Literackie 2016)

=== Board Games ===
- The Edge: Dawnfall (2018)
- Tainted Grail: The Fall of Avalon (2019)
- ISS Vanguard (2021)
- Tainted Grail: Kings of Ruin (2024)
- Lands of Evershade (2026)
