= Miroslav Žamboch =

Czech physicist and author (born 1972)

Miroslav Žamboch (born 13 January 1972) is a Czech physicist and author known for writing novels and short stories in the science fiction and fantasy genres.

A native of the Moravian town of Hranice, Miroslav Žamboch graduated with a degree in physics from the Department of Nuclear Sciences and Physical Engineering of the Czech Technical University in Prague. He works at the Institute for Nuclear Studies and, since the mid-1990s, has written over twenty novels and several collections of short stories.

In 2011, upon the occasion of his work translation to Korean, he has been described as a representative of the most recent generation of Czech science fiction and fantasy writers. As of 2013 at least seventeen of his books have been translated into Polish.

Žamboch is also known as an outdoorsman and physical fitness enthusiast, having participated in judo exhibitions, amateur boxing, mountain climbing and downhill cycling.

== Selected works ==
=== Series ===
- series Knižní (5 books as of 2014)
- series Bakly (5 books as of 2014)
- series Agent John Francis Kovář (11 books as of 2014)

=== Books not part of a series ===
- Poslední bere vše, Poutník, 2000
- Seržant, Poutník, 2002
- Meč proti sekeře, 2003
- Megapolis, 2004
- Líheň, two part novel:
  - Part 1.: Smrt zrozená v Praze, Wolf Publishing, 2004 (ISBN 80-239-3757-X),
  - Part 2.: Královna smrti, Wolf Publishing, 2005 (ISBN 80-239-4476-2),
  - Líheň, both parts, Triton, 2009 (ISBN 978-80-7387-277-9),
- Na křídlech tornáda, 2004
- Jennifer, Triton, Prague 2005, micro novel
- Maverick – Pěšec na odpis, Triton, Prague 2006, micro novel
- Basil – valašský vojvoda, Triton, Prague 2006, micro novel
- Drsný spasitel, 2007
- Predátoři, 2007
- Dlouhý sprint s ozvěnou, 2009
- Visio in Extremis, 2011
- Živí a mrtví, Freetim(e)publishing, Prague 2011, short stories, (ISBN 978-80-87538-22-7)
- Ve službách klanu, 2013
- Zakuti v oceli, Triton, Prague 2016, (ISBN 978-80-7553-175-9).
