= Nautilus Award =

Polish science fiction and fantasy award

Nautilus Award was a Polish science fiction and fantasy award created by Robert J. Szmidt of the Science Fiction magazine, awarded from 2003 to 2012.

Each year, five novels and short stories are recognized. The awards have been presented for years 2003–2007, 2009-2010 and 2012. The awards were not given out in 2008 due to magazine publisher change and in 2011 due to the magazine folding. The last edition of the award, in 2014, was cancelled due to controversies over vote counting, and the award has not been awarded since.
