= Jarosław Grzędowicz =

Polish writer

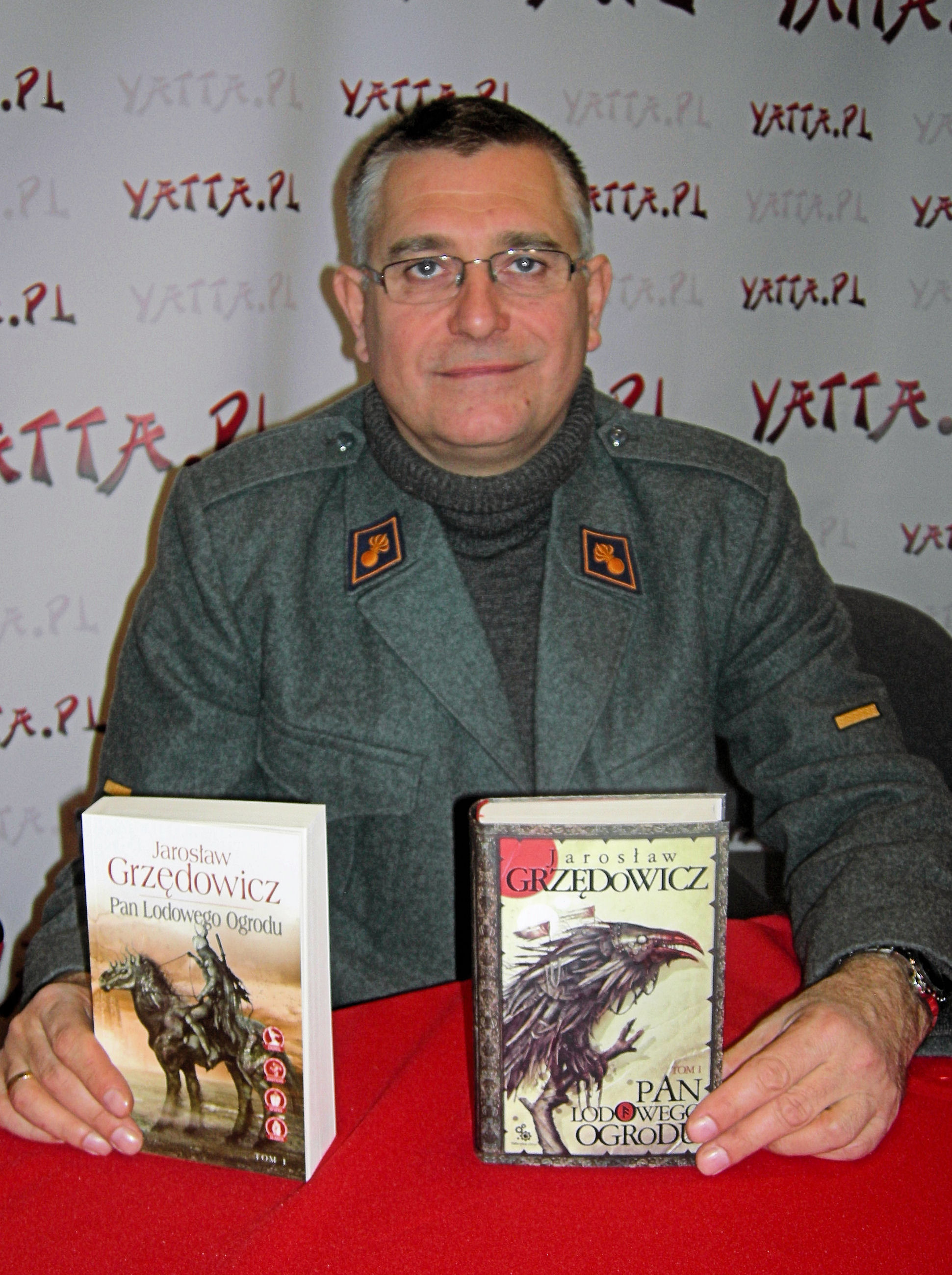
- Grzędowicz at the 2014 Multigenre Fan Convention Pyrkon
- Born: 3 May 1965 (age 61); Wrocław, Poland
- Occupations: Short-story writer; Novelist
- Spouse: Maja Lidia Kossakowska
- Writing career
- Genre: Fantasy

Jarosław Grzędowicz (born 3 May 1965) is a Polish science-fiction and fantasy writer. His first published piece was a short story in 1982. He was one of the founders of Fenix magazine in 1990 and its chief editor from 1993 till its suspension in 2001. In the meantime he has published several short stories and translated several comic books. He has been a journalist of Gazeta Polska. His first short story collection was published in 2003. His first novel (Pan Lodowego Ogrodu) was published in 2005, his second, Popiół i kurz, in 2006. In 2006 he received Janusz A. Zajdel Award in both possible categories: for novel Pan Lodowego Ogrodu, tom I and short story Wilcza zamieć, and in 2007 Popiół i kurz won in the novel category. He was married to fellow fantasy writer Maja Lidia Kossakowska until her death in 2022. Five of his books were published as part of Mistrzowie Polskiej Fantastyki (Masters of Polish Fantasy) collection in 2018.

== Bibliography ==
=== Novels and anthologies ===
- Księga jesiennych demonów (The Book of the Autumn Demons) - Fabryka Słów 2003, 2010, 2011
- Pan Lodowego Ogrodu - tom 1 (The Lord of the Ice Garden, vol. 1) - Fabryka Słów 2005, 2009, 2011
- Popiół i kurz. Opowieść ze świata Pomiędzy (Ash and Dust. A Tale from the In-Between World) - Fabryka Słów 2006, 2010
- Pan Lodowego Ogrodu - tom 2 (The Lord of the Ice Garden, vol. 2) - Fabryka Słów 2007
- Wypychacz zwierząt (The Animal Stuffer) - Fabryka Słów 2008
- Pan Lodowego Ogrodu - tom 3 (The Lord of the Ice Garden, vol. 3) - Fabryka Słów 2009
- Pan Lodowego Ogrodu - tom 4 (The Lord of the Ice Garden, vol. 4) - Fabryka Słów 2012
- Hel 3 Fabryka Słów, luty 2017
- Azyl (collection) (Refuge) - Fabryka Słów 2017
