= Fabryka Słów =

Polish publishing house specializing in fantasy and science fiction literature

- Status: Active
- Founded: 2001
- Founder: Eryk Górski, Robert Łakuta
- Country of origin: Poland
- Headquarters location: Lublin
- Distribution: Poland
- Publication types: Books
- Fiction genres: Fantasy
- Official website: fabrykaslow.com.pl

Fabryka Słów (English: Factory of Words) is a Warsaw-based Polish publishing house. It was founded in Lublin in 2001 by Eryk Adam Górski and Robert Łakuta who always wanted to publish good literature they liked reading themselves. It is focused on the fantasy and science fiction genres. Fabryka Słów also publishes historical novels and journalism for example Hubal by Jacek Komuda and Polactwo by Rafał Ziemkiewicz. It owns a number of popular series, most notably: Pan Lodowego Ogrodu, Achaja, Demonic Cycle, Seria o Przygodach Jakuba Wędrowycza, Inkwizytor Mordimer. Since 2013 they have been publishing a literary series of Fabryczna Zona (post-apocalyptic S.T.A.L.K.E.R universe).

The first book published by the Fabryka Słów was Kroniki Jakuba Wędrowycza by Andrzej Pilipiuk. So far there have been more than fifteen titles in this series. Other notable Polish authors who published in Fabryka Słów are: Andrzej Ziemiański, Eugeniusz Dębski, Jacek Komuda, Rafał A. Ziemkiewicz, Jarosław Grzędowicz, Maja Lidia Kossakowska, Jacek Piekara, Michał Gołkowski, Tomasz Kołodziejczak, Magdalena Kozak, Adam Przechrzta. Fabryka Słów publishes foreign authors too, for example: Peter V.Brett, Miroslav Żamboch, Angus Watson, Brian McClellan, Patricia Briggs, Ilona Andrews, R. F. Kuang, Roman Kulikow, and Jack Campbell.

In June 2009, the publishing house took over the magazine "Science Fiction". After changing the owner, Rafał Dębski became the editor in chief of the magazine (currently not existing).
