= Artur Ganszyniec =

Polish game designer (born 1977)

Artur Ganszyniec (born 17 December 1977) is a Polish role-playing game, board game and video game designer.

He is known for being the lead story designer on The Witcher, as well as the creator of the Wolsung steampunk role-playing game and board game. His other work includes The Witcher 2: Assassins of Kings, Call of Juarez: The Cartel, Another Case Solved and Wanderlust Travel Stories.

In June 2019, he wrote a slow gaming manifesto, based on the models of slow living and slow food movements.
