= Maja Lidia Kossakowska =

Polish writer (1972–2022)

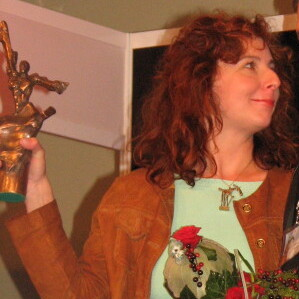
- Kossakowska in 2007 at Zajdel Awards
- Born: 27 February 1972; Warsaw, Poland
- Died: 23 May 2022 (aged 50); Stare Załubice, Masovian Voivodeship, Poland
- Education: University of Warsaw
- Occupation: Writer
- Spouse: Jarosław Grzędowicz

Maja Lidia Kossakowska-Grzędowicz (27 February 1972 – 23 May 2022) was a Polish fantasy writer. She was first published in 1997. She was nominated eight times for the Janusz A. Zajdel Award for her short stories and novels, and received it in 2007 for the short story Smok tańczy dla Chung Fonga. She also received several other awards. She is best known for using angel themes in her work. She was the author of thirteen books and many short stories.

She was the wife of another fantasy writer, Jarosław Grzędowicz. She died on 23 May 2022 in a house fire at the age of 50.
