= Katarzyna Gójska =

Polish journalist and publicist

- Born: 30 July 1977 (age 48)
- Occupations: Journalist; press columnist
- Years active: 1990s–present
- Employer(s): Gazeta Polska, TV Republika
- Known for: Conservative political commentary in Poland
- Spouse: Michał Rachoń (m. 2017)

Katarzyna Gójska (born 30 July 1977) is a Polish journalist, press, radio and television columnist, editor-in-chief of the monthly Niezależna Gazeta Polska – Nowe Państwo.

== Career ==
In the second half of the 1990s, she was active in the Polish right-wing and anti-communist organization Liga Republikańska. She collaborated closely with Mariusz Kamiński. She was employed in the editorial office of the weekly "Gazeta Polska". Gójska became the deputy editor-in-chief of this magazine, Tomasz Sakiewicz, as well as of the daily "Gazeta Polska Codziennie". She was the editor-in-chief of the quarterly "Nowe Państwo" and the monthly "Niezależna Gazeta Polska", since September 2009 merged into the monthly "Niezależna Gazeta Polska – Nowe Państwo". Since 2009, Gójska is the editor-in-chief of this right-wing monthly. She became a member of the management board of the Niezależne Wydawnictwo Polskie (Independent Polish Publishing House) and was appointed as an authorized signatory (commercial proxy) of Słowo Niezależne Sp. z o.o., the company publishing the monthly magazine "Niezależna Gazeta Polska" and the news website Niezalezna.pl.

Together with Witold Gadowski, she was the originator of the television series "Cienie PRL-u" (Shadows of the Polish People's Republic), broadcast on TVP1, hosted and co-authored by Bronisław Wildstein. In the years 2008–2023 she worked at Polskie Radio. Since 2008, she has been hosting the "Klub Trójki" program on Polskie Radio Program III. From October 2017 to December 2023, she was a co-host of the program "Sygnały dnia" on Polskie Radio Program I.

In January 2013, Gójska joined the supervisory board of Telewizja Niezależna S.A., managing the Telewizja Republika station. Since 2013, she has been co-hosting the program "Kulisy manipulacji" (Behind the Scenes of Manipulation) with Piotr Lisiewicz. From 2013 to 2020 she co-hosted the "Nowe pokolenie" (New Generation) program with Joanna Lichocka. Since 2015, he has been hosting the "W punkt" program in the evening broadcast. Since 2018, Gójska has hosted the "7x24" program, which features debates with politicians from all major parliamentary groups and was also broadcast on Polskie Radio 24. Since July 2025, she has been co-hosting the "Rewolwer" program.

Katarzyna Gójska is married to journalist Michał Rachoń. They live in the countryside near Warsaw. She declared herself to be a Catholic.
