= Wojciech Mucha =

Polish journalist and writer

- Born: 4 May 1983 (age 43)
- Education: Jesuit University Ignatianum in Krakow
- Occupations: Journalist; writer
- Years active: 2001–present
- Employer(s): Gazeta Polska Codziennie, Dziennik Polski, TVP, TV Republika
- Known for: Conservative political commentary in Poland

Wojciech Mucha (born 4 May 1983) is a Polish journalist and writer, former editor-in-chief of Dziennik Polski and Gazeta Krakowska.

== Career ==
Wojciech Mucha was born in Kraków on May 4, 1983. He completed cultural studies at the Ignatianum Academy in Kraków, where he met Janusz Kurtyka and Andrzej Waśko. He completed an internship at the Institute of National Remembrance. In the years 2011–2014 he was a journalist for "Gazeta Polska Codziennie". He was also responsible for correspondence from Ukraine in 2013–2015. He was a member of the editorial board of the quarterly "Fronda". He hosted "Cztery Strony" on TVP Info and "Twój Wybór" (Your Choice), "Chip – Cywilizacja, Historia i Polityka", "Echa Dnia" on the shared band of TVP3. In December 2016, together with Tomasz Sakiewicz, he interviewed President Andrzej Duda for "Gazeta Polska". From 2016 to 2020, as a member of the editorial team of "Gazeta Polska", he was in charge of the opinion section. He also wrote for the Hungarian daily "Magyar Hírlap". In 2021-2022, he was the editor-in-chief of "Dziennik Polski" and "Gazeta Krakowska". Together with Wojciech Pokora, he hosted the program "Demaskatorzy" on TVP Info. Mucha collaborates with TV Republika, where he participates in the evening program "Kulisy manipulacji" (Behind the Scenes of Manipulation). He is also a regularly invited television columnist.

== Selected publications ==
Mucha is the author of numerous articles and published press releases. He has also written or co-authored several books.

- 2014 – Krew i ziemia: o ukraińskiej rewolucji ISBN 978-83-64095-58-0
- 2017 – Matki niepokornych [co-authored with Jacek Liziniewicz and Anna Eliza Wasilewska] ISBN 978-83-61003-03-8
- 2019 – Miasto noży ISBN 978-83-60685-49-5
- 2025 – Kampania: jak wygrać wybory i nie dać się złapać [co-authored with Andrzej Gajcy] ISBN 978-83-974857-7-8
