= Michał Rachoń =

Polish journalist, publicist, and basketball player

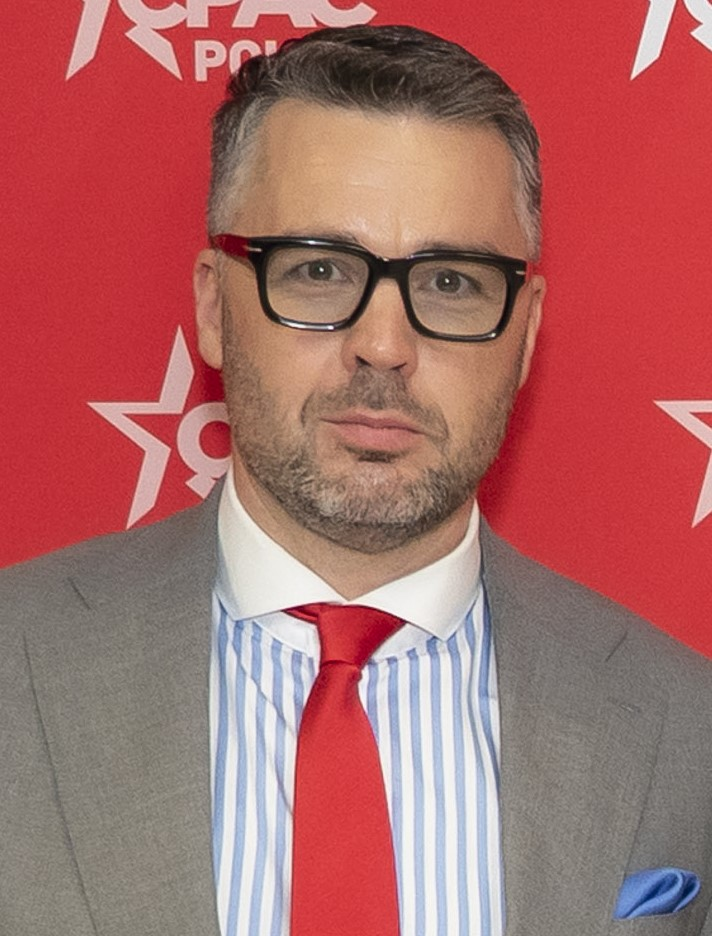
- Michał Rachoń, 2025
- Born: Michał Paweł Rachoń; 22 October 1978 (age 47)
- Education: University of Gdańsk, East European Studies at the University of Warsaw
- Occupations: Journalist; press columnist
- Years active: 1994–present
- Known for: Conservative political commentary in Poland
- Spouse: Katarzyna Gójska (m. 2017)
- Children: 3

Michał Paweł Rachoń (born 22 October 1978) is a Polish political activist, journalist, press, radio and television columnist, basketball player.

== Career ==
Rachoń graduated in political science from the Faculty of Social Sciences of the University of Gdańsk. He then completed postgraduate studies at the Centre for East European Studies at the University of Warsaw. He worked on tennis tournaments, regattas and a yacht rally called "Baltic Sail". He was an active basketball player (AZS Gdańsk University of Technology club). In 2011, he worked on the organization of the European Women's Basketball Championship.

According to press reports, he was initially close to the Civic Platform circles. In 2002 he became an activist of Law and Justice. Together with Jakub Świderski, he organized political happenings. In the 2004 European Parliament elections he led the campaign of Anna Fotyga (PiS). From March to August 2007 he served as the press spokesman for the Ministry of the Interior and Administration. From July 2008 to January 2012 he was the press spokesman for Law and Justice in Sopot. During this period, he was involved in the campaign before the referendum on the dismissal of the mayor of Sopot, Jacek Karnowski (May 17, 2009).

In 2012, he started collaborating with the weekly "Gazeta Polska", as well as with the related daily "Gazeta Polska Codziennie", the monthly "Niezależna Gazeta Polska – Nowe Państwo" and the internet portal Niezalezna.pl. Until March 2013 he was a member of the TVP Gdańsk program council. In 2013, he became the host of the morning program "Polska na dzień dobry" on Telewizja Republika. On this station he also hosted the program "Co wiemy" and "Republika na żywo". On January 13, 2016, he became deputy director of the Television Information Agency (Telewizja Polska). He was dismissed from this office on March 11, 2016. From February 14, 2016, to December 19, 2023, he hosted the "Woronicza 17" program on TVP Info. From March 14, 2016, to December 19, 2023, Rachoń hosted the program "Minęła dwudziesta" on TVP Info. From February 22 to May 9, 2016, he co-hosted the Monday edition of "Sygnały dnia" on Polskie Radio Program I.

In 2016, for conducting a live report in December 2014 of the testimony given in court by President Bronisław Komorowski, a witness in the so-called "afera marszałkowa" (Marshal's affair), he received the Grand Prize of Freedom of Speech from the Association of Polish Journalists (for saving the honor of Polish journalism in a situation where other news media failed).

In June 2019, he was a special envoy for Telewizja Polska covering the foreign visit of President Andrzej Duda and his wife to the United States. In the same month, he began hosting the current affairs program "Jedziemy" on TVP Info.

Together with historian Sławomir Cenckiewicz, he created the documentary series "Reset", which premiered in 2023 on TVP1 and TVP Info, and was later also broadcast by Telewizja Republika. For creating the series, they both received the Gazeta Polska Clubs Award for 2024. Rachoń, together with Cenckiewicz, also wrote a book entitled "Zgoda. Rząd i służby Tuska w objęciach Putina" (Consent: Tusk's Government and Services in Putin's Embrace), which was published in 2024.

Together with journalist Anna Bogusiewicz, he led a debate before the 2023 Polish parliamentary elections for Telewizja Polska.

From December 21, 2023, to February 2025, he hosted a revived version of his TVP program on Telewizja Republika, this time titled "#Jedziemy. Michał Rachoń". On December 28, 2023, he became the program director of this television station. On October 7, 2024, he interviewed US presidential candidate Donald Trump for Telewizja Republika. Since February 11, 2025, his program has been called "Michał #Rachoń". Since July 2025, Rachoń has been co-hosting the "Rewolwer" program.

== Views ==
Michał Rachoń protested against being called a politician despite his long-standing party activity in the Law and Justice party (PiS), including serving as a political spokesman. He admitted that he owes his views to historian and political scientist Jerzy Targalski (1952–2021).

In 2011, he expressed the opinion that "the technology that the people of the Soviet services learned in the crash of the Mozambican Tu-134 in 1986 was used in the crash of the Polish Tu-154 in Smolensk in 2010."

== Books ==
- Zgoda. Rząd i służby Tuska w objęciach Putina, Transatlantic Foundation, Warszawa 2024, [co-authored with Sławomir Cenckiewicz] ISBN 978-83-972668-0-3
- Reset – jak Tusk wprowadzał Rosję do Polski, Wydawnictwo Niezależne, 2026, [co-authored with Sławomir Cenckiewicz and Grzegorz Wierzchołowski] ISBN 978-83-972668-3-4

== Private life ==
Michał Rachoń comes from the city of Sopot. He is married to journalist Katarzyna Gójska. The couple has three daughters. They live in the countryside near Warsaw. Michał Rachoń declared himself to be a Catholic.
