= Jacek Liziniewicz =

Polish journalist and publicist

- Occupations: Journalist; press columnist
- Employer(s): Gazeta Polska, TV Republika
- Known for: Conservative political commentary in Poland

Jacek Liziniewicz is a Polish journalist, press and television columnist.

== Career ==
Liziniewicz publishes in the daily "Gazeta Polska Codziennie", the weekly "Gazeta Polska" and the monthly "Niezależna Gazeta Polska – Nowe Państwo". After 2015, he appeared as a publicist in various programs on TVP Info and TV Republika. In November 2019, a media industry website described Liziniewicz as one of the regular commentators on political events featured on Michał Rachoń's program #Jedziemy, appearing alongside Jarosław Jakimowicz and former police inspector Jacek Wrona.

Liziniewicz's body of work includes numerous columns, political commentaries, critical analyses of Poland's economy and environmental issues, as well as interviews.

In 2014, Liziniewicz collaborated with Anita Gargas on the production of the investigative documentary "Anatomia upadku 2" (Anatomy of a Fall 2) about the Smolensk air disaster in 2010.
