= Sunflower Student Movement =

2014 protest movement in Taiwan

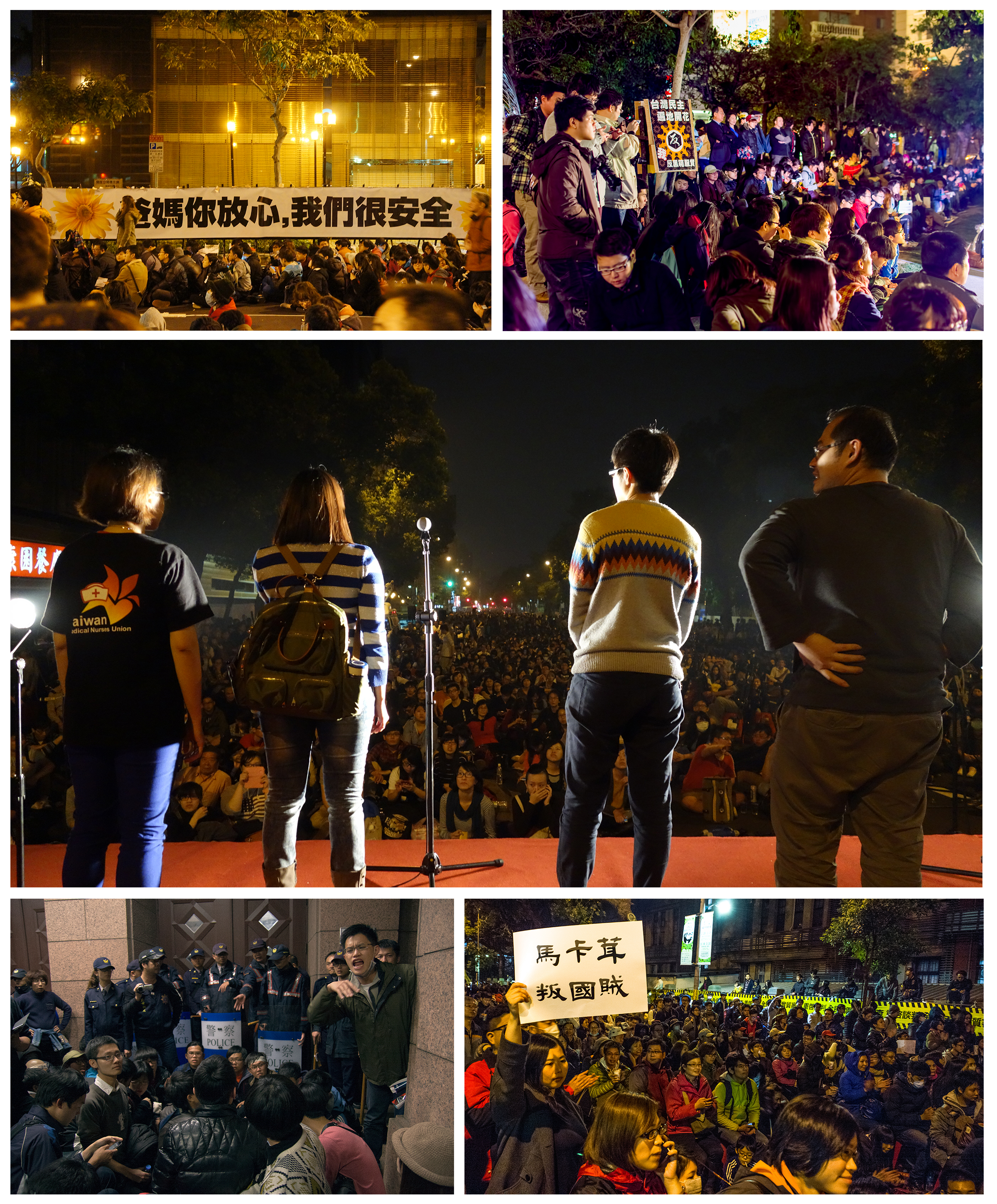
- Date: March 18 – April 10, 2014 (23 days)
- Location: Legislative Yuan; Zhongzheng District, Taipei City, Taiwan; 25°2′40″N 121°31′10″E
- Caused by: Cross-Strait Service Trade Agreement
- Goals: Halt the enforcement of Cross-Strait Service Trade Agreement; Legislate supervision on cross-strait agreements; Convene citizens' constitutional conference
- Methods: Sit-ins, occupation, strike actions, demonstrations, online activism, protest marches, civil disobedience, civil resistance, student activism
- Result: Implementation of the Cross-Strait Service Trade Agreement halted

Parties
| Students and civic groups: Black Island Nation Youth Front; Green Citizens' Action Alliance; Citizen Action Coalition 1985 | (Taiwan) Republic of China Government: National Police Agency; Kuomintang |

Lead figures
| Lin Fei-fan; Chen Wei-ting Huang Kuo-chang | Ma Ying-jeou (President); Jiang Yi-huah (Premier) |

Number
| Legislative Yuan: 400+ protesters in the chamber; 10,000+ protesters surrounding the Yuan | |

Sunflower Student Movement
- Traditional Chinese: 太陽花學運
- Simplified Chinese: 太阳花学运
- Literal meaning: Sunflower Student Movement
Transcriptions
Standard Mandarin
- Hanyu Pinyin: Tàiyánghuā Xuéyùn
- Bopomofo: ㄊㄞˋ ㄧㄤˊ ㄏㄨㄚ ㄒㄩㄝˊ ㄩㄣˋ
- Wade–Giles: T‘ai^{4}-yang^{2}-hua^{1} Hsüeh^{2}-yün^{4}
Hakka
- Pha̍k-fa-sṳ: Thai-yòng-fâ Ho̍k-yun
Yue: Cantonese
- Yale Romanization: Taaiyèuhngfā Hohk'wahn
- Jyutping: Taai^{3}-joeng^{4}-faa^{1} Hok^{6}-wan^{6}
Southern Min
- Hokkien POJ: Thài-iông-hoe Ha̍k-ūn
- Tâi-lô: Thài-iông-hue Ha̍k-ūn

Alternative Hokkien name
- Traditional Chinese: 日頭花學運
- Literal meaning: Sun Flower Student Movement
Transcriptions
Southern Min
- Hokkien POJ: Ji̍t-thâu-hoe Ha̍k-ūn
- Tâi-lô: Ji̍t-thâu-hue Ha̍k-ūn

The Sunflower Student Movement (Chinese: 太陽花學運) is associated with a protest movement driven by a coalition of students and civic groups that came to a head between March 18 and April 10, 2014, in the Legislative Yuan and later, the Executive Yuan of Taiwan. The activists protested the passage of the Cross-Strait Service Trade Agreement (CSSTA) by the then-ruling Kuomintang (KMT) at the legislature without a clause-by-clause review.

The protesters perceived the trade pact with the People's Republic of China would hurt Taiwan's economy and leave it vulnerable to political pressure from Beijing, while advocates of the treaty argued that increased Chinese investment would provide a "necessary boost" to Taiwan's economy, that the still-unspecified details of the treaty's implementation could be worked out favorably for Taiwan, and that to "pull out" of the treaty by not ratifying it would damage Taiwan's international credibility. The protesters initially demanded the clause-by-clause review of the agreement be reinstated but later changed their demands toward the rejection of the trade pact, the passing of legislation allowing close monitoring of future agreements with China, and citizen conferences discussing constitutional amendments. While the Kuomintang was open to a line-by-line review at a second reading of the agreement, the party rejected the possibility that the pact be returned for a committee review.

The KMT backed down later and said that a joint review committee could be formed if the Democratic Progressive Party (DPP) agreed to participate in the proceedings. That offer was rejected by the DPP, which asked for a review committee on all cross-strait pacts, citing "mainstream public opinion." In turn, the DPP proposal was turned down by the KMT.

The movement marked the first time that the Legislative Yuan had been occupied by citizens. Many Sunflower student activists became further involved in Taiwan's politics in the aftermath.

== Name ==
The term "Sunflower Student Movement" referred to protestors' use of sunflowers as a symbol of hope as the flower is heliotropic. The movement's name in Chinese is (Chinese: 太陽花; pinyin: taì yáng hua), a calque of the English word "sunflower", rather than the native term, (Chinese: 向日葵; pinyin: xiàng rì kuí) This term was popularized after a florist contributed 1000 sunflowers to the students outside the Legislative Yuan building. "Sunflower" was also an allusion to the Wild Lily Movement of 1990 which set a milestone in the democratization of Taiwan. The movement is also known as the "March 18 Student Movement" (318學運) or "Occupy Taiwan Legislature" (佔領國會事件).

The movement's anthem was "Island's Sunrise" by the indie band Fire EX. from Kaohsiung.

== Background ==
On March 17, 2014, Taiwan's ruling Kuomintang (KMT) attempted a unilateral move in the Legislative Yuan to force the Cross-Strait Service Trade Agreement (CSSTA) to the legislative floor without giving it a clause-by-clause review as previously established in a June 2013 agreement with the opposing Democratic Progressive Party (DPP). Previously, in September 2013, the two parties had agreed to hold 16 public hearings over the details of the trade agreement with academics, non-governmental organizations (NGOs) and relevant trade sector representatives. The KMT had chaired eight public hearings within a week, and several members of social groups, NGOs, and business representatives from impacted industries were either not invited or informed at the last minute. When academics and business sector representatives gave their opinions at the hearings, then presiding chair of the legislature's Internal Administrative Committee, KMT legislator Chang Ching-chung, said the agreement had to be adopted in its entirety and could not be amended. Legislative gridlock followed, as the opposing DPP had not completed the eight hearings they had agreed to chair by March 17. Chang, citing Article 61 of the Legislative Yuan Functions Act, announced that the review process had gone beyond the 90 days allotted for review. The agreement, in the KMT's view, should therefore be considered reviewed and should be submitted to a plenary session on March 21 for a final vote.

== Occupation ==
=== Legislative chamber's occupation ===
On March 18 around 9:00 p.m. local time, crowds of students, academics, civic organizations, and other protestors climbed over the fence at the legislature and entered the building. In the melee, one window of the Legislative Yuan was smashed and a police officer suffered serious injuries. A lawyer who was assigned to the protesters stated that six individuals had been arrested over the protest so far. While several hundred protesters remained outside the building, about 300 protesters occupied the legislative floor overnight and succeeded in preventing several attempts by police to expel them. The protesters demanded that the clause-by-clause review of the agreement be reinstated, otherwise they vowed to occupy the legislature until March 21, when the Yuan had scheduled to vote and pass the CSSTA. As night approached, the authorities cut water and electricity to the building. Premier Jiang Yi-huah ordered riot police be sent in to evict the protesters, but that directive was not followed.

Shortly after the movement began, thousands of riot police from the National Police Agency were mobilized across the country to surround the protesters. On March 20, Legislative Speaker Wang Jin-pyng promised not to use force against protesters.

On March 21, Speaker Wang refused to meet with President Ma Ying-jeou and Premier Jiang Yi-huah to discuss a response, stating that the president should listen to the people and that a compromise was needed among the lawmakers first. Premier Jiang met with demonstrators outside the legislature on March 22 but stated that the executive branch had no intention of dropping the trade pact. At a press conference on March 23, President Ma restated his resolve in passing the trade pact and affirmed he did not act following orders from Beijing.

=== Executive bureau occupation and eviction ===
In response to the press conference, a group of protesters led by Dennis Wei stormed and occupied the Executive Yuan around 7:30 p.m. local time on March 23. The protesters were evicted from the Executive Yuan by 5:00 a.m. on March 24, but some congregated again on Zhongxiao East Road. During the 10-hour eviction process, around 1000 riot police and other law enforcement personnel reportedly used excessive force, including water cannon and baton strikes to the head against the nonviolent protesters, while journalists and medics were ordered to leave. More than 150 people were injured and 61 were arrested. The Association of Taiwan Journalists accused the police of using violence against the media during the eviction process and violating freedom of the press, citing more than 10 cases of attacks on media reporters.

=== Attempted negotiations ===
On March 25, President Ma invited representatives of the student protests to his office for a dialog over the controversial trade agreement "without any preconditions", after the president said earlier he would not hold face-to-face talks. One of the student leaders Lin Fei-fan accepted the invitation initially and agreed no preconditions should be set for the meeting, but he said the students wanted to discuss whether Taiwan needed new legislation to monitor all cross-strait agreements, and whether the CSSTA should be postponed until that legislation was introduced. However, one day later, on March 26, the protest leaders rebuffed the invitation to meet despite earlier calling on President Ma to meet with them to answer their demands, as they feel Ma, who was the Chairman of the Kuomintang, was still controlling the Kuomintang legislators via the party regulations, so that the cross-party negotiations failed once again to reach a consensus on the protests and the pact.

On March 26, student protesters called for all legislators to support the establishment of a law for supervising cross-strait agreements before passing the recent trade in services pact. The student activists drafted an undertaking document and asked all lawmakers to sign the document to show their approval.

=== Rally ===
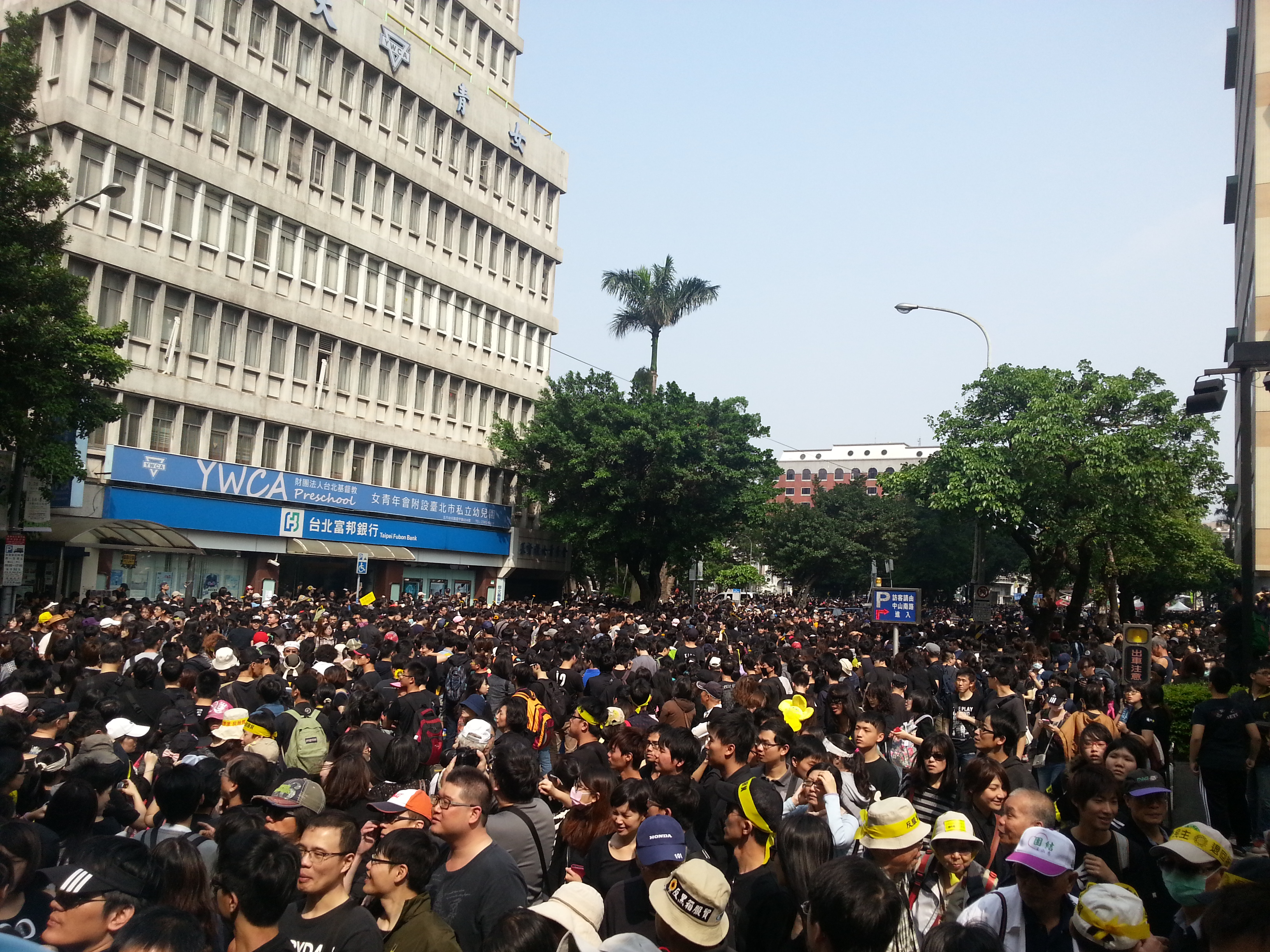
Protesters near NTU hospital

On March 27, Lin Fei-fan called for a March 30 rally filling the Ketagalan Boulevard leading from the Presidential Office to the legislature to put pressure on President Ma to heed the demonstrators' demands. The organizers behind the demonstration said around 500,000 people massed in the March 30 rally, while the police estimated the figure to be 116,000. Twenty-two NGOs also took part in the rally. Hundreds of people opposing the movement held a concurrent rally in the same area, but left before the students dispersed.

On April 1, hundreds of pro-China activists supporting the trade pact rallied against the parliament seizure. The group was organized by Chang An-lo, a prominent Taiwanese gang leader also known as "White Wolf", who was on bail after being arrested on his return to Taiwan from China, where he had fled 17 years previously. He faced charges relating to organized crime.

== Resolution ==
On April 6, Legislative Speaker Wang Jin-pyng visited the occupied parliament chamber and promised to postpone review of the trade pact until legislation monitoring all cross-strait agreements has been passed. However, Alex Fai, a deputy secretary of the KMT caucus, said at a news conference that Wang should have consulted with the KMT caucus in advance, rather than keeping them in the dark. DPP legislative whip Ker Chien-ming dismissed the KMT lawmakers' remarks as being a poor excuse to back down, noting that the KMT lawmakers surrounded Wang when the speaker read his announcement and shouted "Go, go Taiwan" along with Wang after his announcement. According to Presidential Office spokeswoman Garfie Li, President Ma Ying-jeou had no knowledge beforehand of either Wang's Sunday morning visit to protesters at the Legislative Yuan or his promise that the monitoring rules will be implemented before a review, and the president called again for an early passage of the trade pact with China. Premier Jiang Yi-huah has stated that the concessions are not realistic.

In response to the April 6 concessions from Speaker Wang, the protesters held a press conference on April 7 stating they would vacate the Legislative Yuan on April 10 at 6 p.m. local time, which they eventually did, and also continue the movement in the broader Taiwan society. President Ma supported the students' decision to leave the legislature. The legislative chamber was fully cleaned by students before they left.

== Aftermath ==
=== Legal ===
On April 21, Lin Fei-fan, Chen Wei-ting, Huang Kuo-chang and four other key members of the Sunflower Movement attended the Taipei District Prosecutors' Office voluntarily to explain what happened during their occupation of the legislature that began on March 18 and the attempted occupation of the Executive Yuan on March 23. Wellington Koo, one of the lawyers accompanying the group, said that, if charged, the defendants would enter a plea of not guilty. The prosecutors said that several protestors stood accused of a number of offenses, such as obstruction of justice.

By June 2014, over four hundred people had been questioned or investigated by prosecutors and the police for their role in the protest.

On July 30, 23 injured protesters filed suit against premier Jiang Yi-huah, National Police Agency Director-General Wang Cho-chiun, Taipei Police Commissioner Huang Sheng-yung and Zhongzheng First Police Precinct Chief Fang Yang-ning on charges of attempted murder, coercion and causing bodily harm. More than one hundred demonstrators massed outside the court, calling for Jiang to resign. Jiang's cabinet also sued 126 protesters involved with the storming of the Executive Yuan. Soon after taking office on May 20, 2016, the Tsai Ing-wen administration and new premier Lin Chuan dropped the charges.

In August 2014, a Taichung police officer was given a suspended 3-month prison sentence and fined for making an expletive-filled Facebook post against the protesting students. In May 2015, 39 protesters were charged with trespassing for their role in the occupation of the Executive Yuan. Three months later, the Taipei District Court found that police actions had violated the Act Governing the Use of Police Weapons, and ordered the Taipei City Government to pay NT$30,000 to a protester, Lin Ming-hui. In September, lawyers representing 30 other protesters petitioned Taipei City Government for NT$10 million in damages.

Court proceedings against 21 protesters began in June 2016. First to be charged with various offenses included Chen Wei-ting, Huang Kuo-chang, Lin Fei-fan and Wei Yang. In August, the Taiwan High Court overturned a decision by the Taipei District Court and found Chen Wei-ting and Tsay Ting-kuei not guilty of obstruction. In March 2017, the district court acquitted Chen, Huang and Lin of incitement charges. The High Court upheld that decision in March 2018 but in April 2020 overturned previous rulings on appeal and found seven protesters guilty of incitement, obstruction, theft, and damage of public property. The protesters appealed to the Supreme Court, arguing for their right to civil disobedience. A judicial panel found that their actions exceeded the bounds of civil disobedience. However, it also concluded that they did not incite crimes in others, only aided or abetted them, and therefore revoked the guilty rulings for the incitement charge. The case was then remanded to the High Court and closed because the Executive Yuan had decided to drop most of its charges by then. 11 other protesters have been convicted on charges of damaging public property and forcibly obstructing law enforcement.

=== Political ===
In a meeting with Taiwanese politician James Soong on May 7, 2014, General Secretary of the Chinese Communist Party Xi Jinping said that economic integration between China and Taiwan was mutually beneficial, would bring positive results for both sides and should not be disturbed. Xi appeared to address the Sunflower Movement indirectly, saying China wanted to know more about the concerns of people in Taiwan. Soong urged Beijing to be more tolerant of Taiwan's centrist and pluralist views.

On May 18, Lin Fei-fan, Chen Wei-ting and Huang Kuo-chang formed a new organization, Taiwan March. The organization aims to reform Taiwan's referendum laws and push for legislative review of the CSSTA, along with other cross-strait pacts and economic bills.

On May 21, DPP legislators criticized the Mainland Affairs Council for classifying the disadvantages of the trade accord and releasing only information it considers favorable to the agreement. Responding to the questions, Mainland Affairs Council Minister Wang Yu-chi said that the classified information was to be used for reference only within the government. Deputy Minister of Economic Affairs Cho Shih-chao said that research produced by academics is only used for internal reference for decision making. However, neither official explained why only poll numbers favorable to the government's position have been released to the public, while others were not.

On June 9, deputy economics minister Woody Duh confirmed that since April, China had frozen negotiations with Taiwan over the merchandise trade agreement originally projected to be signed at the end of 2014. Some observers attributed the freeze to the services pact logjam. The Legislative Yuan held an extraordinary session on June 13 to review the services trade pact and the draft bill to increase scrutiny of future cross-strait agreements. Duh urged the legislature to quickly approve the services trade pact and the new law to increase scrutiny of future agreements to avoid delaying the follow-up merchandise trade deal talks. President Ma called for progress to be made in the session.

==== Hillary Clinton comments ====
In an interview for Business Weekly published on June 25, former Secretary of State Hillary Clinton said that the United States does not want Taiwan's independence to be threatened or undermined. Referring to the Russo-Ukrainian war, she further warned that any loss of economic independence will affect Taiwan's political independence, and that over-reliance on China will leave Taiwan vulnerable.

While thanking Clinton for reminding Taiwan to act "carefully and smartly" when dealing with China, the Mainland Affairs Council said Taiwan's steady promotion of exchanges with China had not led to any such critical "reliance" on China, and that Taiwan had not lost its economic and political independence.

==== Local and general elections ====
In August 2014, leaders of the student movement visited the United States, meeting with the US Congress, Department of State and the American Institute in Taiwan. The delegation of students led by Lin Fei-fan reiterated their rejection of the One China policy, further commenting that if Taiwanese president Ma Ying-jeou met with Chinese leader Xi Jinping, students would protest again. Lin stressed that the movement was not controlled by either the Kuomintang or Democratic Progressive Party. Chen Wei-ting and Huang Kuo-chang both called the movement a "third force" in the politics of Taiwan.

The KMT suffered heavy setbacks in the 2014 local elections in December 2014. The party of then President Ma Ying-jeou lost to the DPP in many election contests for 11,130 mayors, councillors and town chiefs throughout the country.

On July 23, 2015, a protest related to the Sunflower Movement occurred, as high school students surrounded and briefly occupied the Ministry of Education due to proposed social studies curriculum changes as well as student distress about political corruption; it was referred to as the Anti Black Box Movement.

==== New Power Party ====
In 2015, the New Power Party emerged from the Sunflower Movement, advocating universal human rights, civil and political liberties, as well as Taiwan independence.

The KMT experienced losses in the 2016 Taiwan general election. One of the New Power Party founders, Freddy Lim defeated incumbent KMT legislator Lin Yu-fang in the 2016 Legislative Yuan election for the Zhongzheng–Wanhua constituency. The New Power Party won a total of five seats in the Legislative Yuan (including Lim); it became the third-largest political party of Taiwan.

=== Zhang Zhijun visit ===
To rebuild cross-strait ties after the Sunflower Movement protests, China's Taiwan Affairs Office Minister Zhang Zhijun arrived in Taiwan on June 25 for a four-day visit as part of the 2014 Wang-Zhang Meeting. Zhang met with his Taiwanese counterpart, Mainland Affairs Council Minister Wang Yu-chi at the Novotel Taipei Taoyuan International Airport hotel, with groups of protesters held back by police cordons. Zhang and Wang agreed to establish a direct communication mechanism heralded as the first of its kind, which allows concerned officials from both sides to cut through the bureaucracy and make direct calls to discuss important matters. During the visit, Zhang mentioned he wanted to hear different voices from the ground, but no meetings had been scheduled with leaders of the Sunflower Movement. Instead, Zhang met with a pre-selected group of students.

Before Zhang's arrival on June 25, the Novotel hotel had also been the scene for an incident which was condemned by the Taiwan Association for Human Rights. After members of protest organizations booked a room at the hotel, police and hotel staff reportedly entered the room without authorization and demanded the guests check out immediately. Hotel management said in a statement that the number of people staying in the room did not correspond with the number registered at the reception. The extra guests were seen moving around inside the hotel, and calls for an explanation remained unanswered, the hotel said. The activists later complained they had been unlawfully detained in their room after the forced entry, with no water or food allowed into the room.

When Zhang arrived at a casual meeting with Wang Yu-chi at Sizihwan Sunset Beach Resort in Xiziwan, Gushan District on June 27 around 8:10 pm, protesters organized by Taiwan Solidarity Union and Black Island National Youth Front greeted the motorcade by spraying white paint and throwing ghost money, shouting slogans such as "One Country on Each Side" and "Zhang Zhijun get out of here". The white paint did not hit Zhang but did hit his body guards.

In August 2014, a reporter who covered the Zhang visit sued police over an alleged infringement of press freedom. He claimed to be there covering the protest and did not take part, but was still barred from recording the scene after showing his press credentials.

== Reactions ==
=== In Taiwan ===
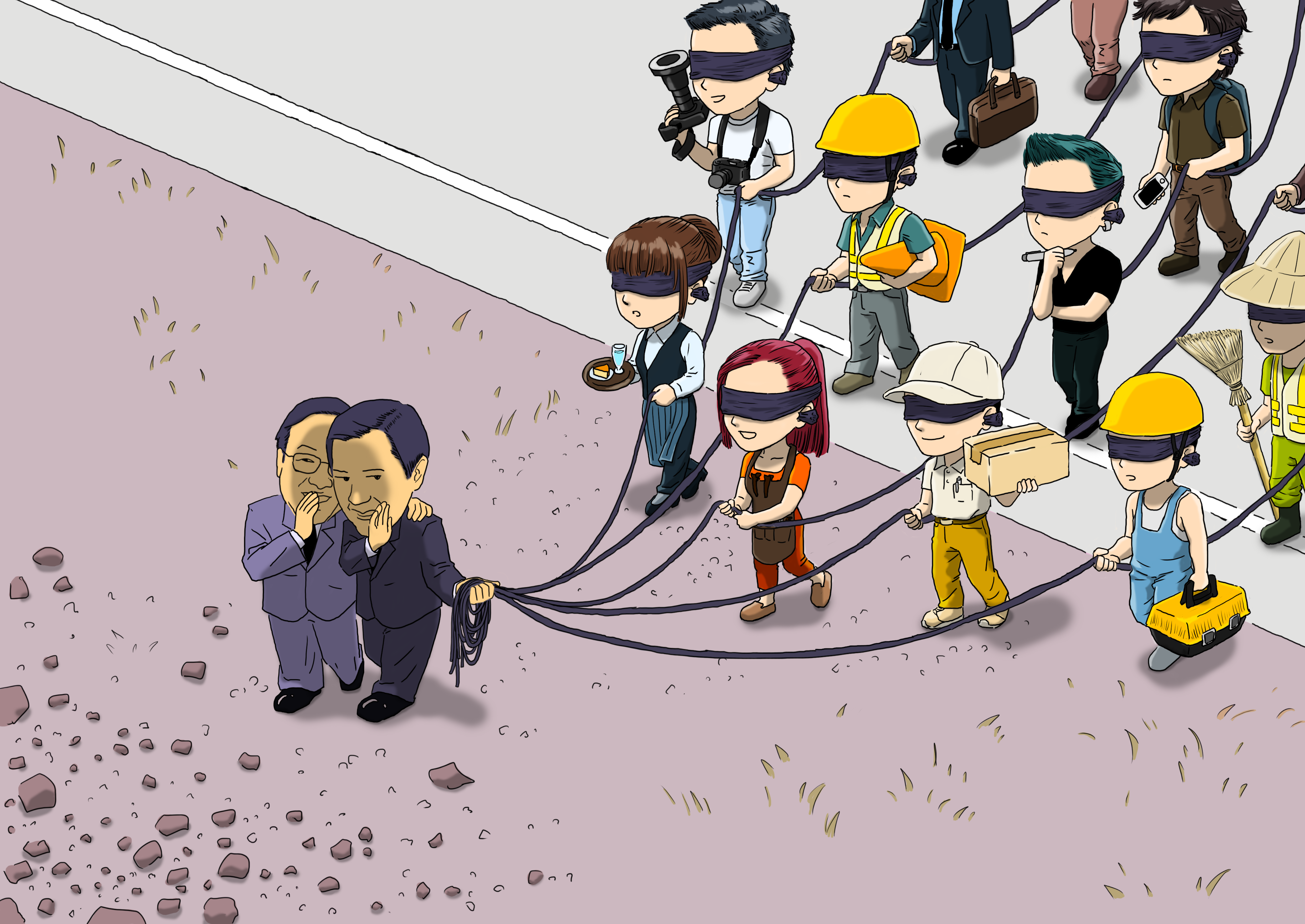
Activists representation of CSSTA

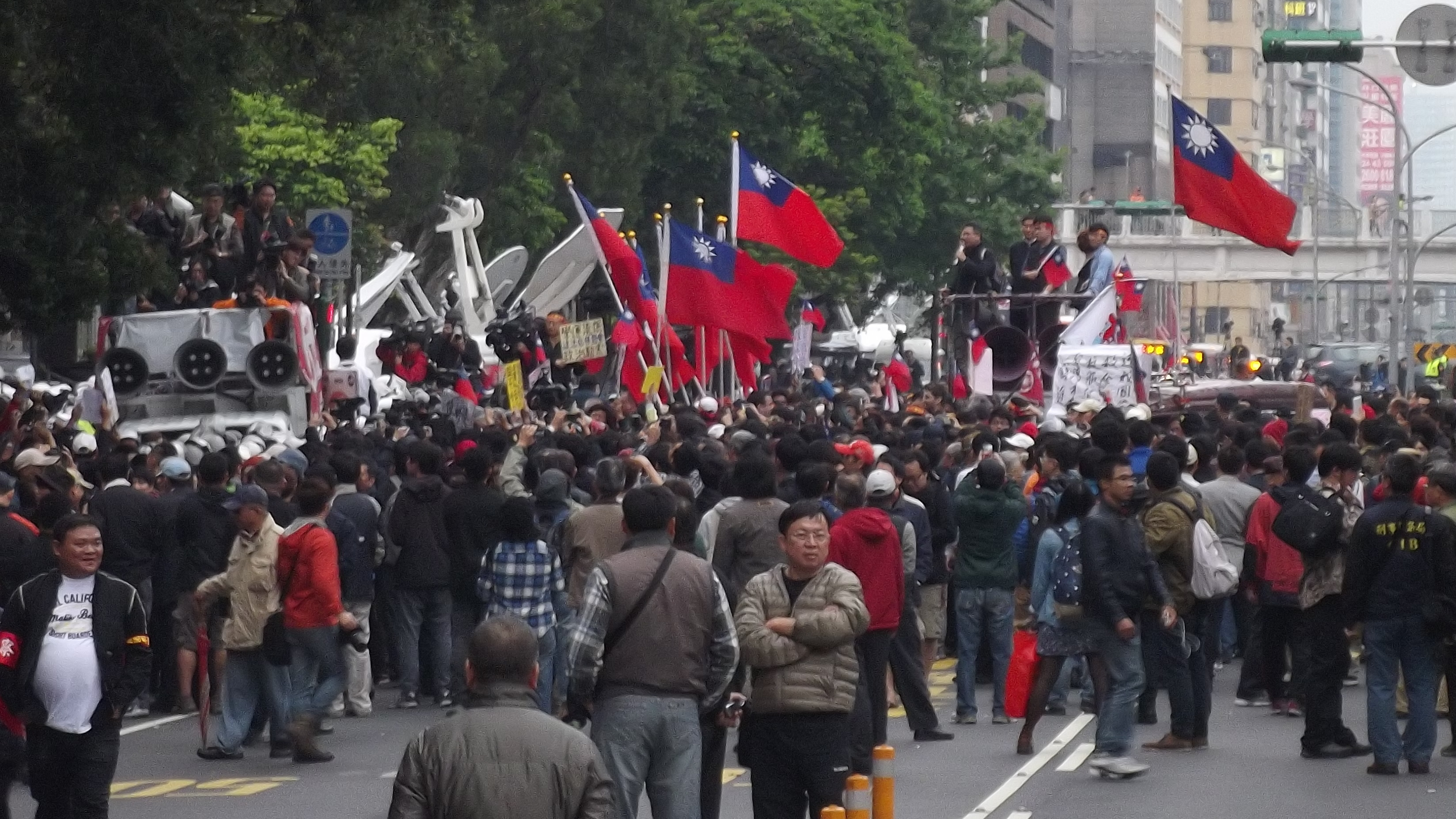
Chinese Unification Promotion Party and other Chinese nationalist and pro-communist supporters clashing with protestors during the Sunflower Student Movement in Taipei

More than 200 professors and industry experts issued joint statements and held panel discussions warning the national security risks raised in the opening of the type II telecommunication services outlined in the trade pact. The National Communications Commission denied the liberalization of telecommunication services would pose security threats.

On March 21, a group of presidents from the 52-member Associations of national universities of Taiwan issued a joint statement calling on President Ma Ying-jeou to respond to the student-led protesters' demands, and urged Ma to engage in talks with student protest leaders as soon as possible to defuse the situation. 25 of 34 professors at the National Taiwan University Mathematics Department also issued another statement declaring their support for the protesting students and the public, stating that:

We are not against the signing of the service trade agreement per se, since we do live in a world being swept by globalization, but the signing and review processes must be transparent and executed with due process. This is why we support what the students are demanding, which is rejecting any agreement signed 'in a black box.

The statement also criticized remarks made earlier by a high-ranking Ministry of Economic Affairs official, who described the agreement as "beneficial to the students because after its implementation, they can work in China and earn NT$52,000 a month, rather than [the] NT$22,000 [they would make in Taiwan]." In the statement, the professors also asked if "sending [Taiwan's] educated youth to China for work [was] the government's only solution for the nation's low wage and wealth gap problems."

The National Alliance of Parents Organization issued a statement on March 22 that supported the students, called for dialog, and praised the students' civic consciousness.

Multiple Taiwanese entertainers, including Deserts Chang, Giddens Ko, and Lin Cheng-sheng criticized the government's eviction of students from the Executive Yuan.

On March 22, Premier Jiang Yi-huah met with protesters but declined to withdraw the deal or agree to legislation monitoring future cross-strait agreements, saying that the two issues required the involvement of the Executive Yuan and President Ma Ying-jeou. Jiang stated that there is no need to enact new laws monitoring cross-strait agreements since "the governing party the Kuomintang has already proposed measures pertaining to the monitoring of such agreements by the legislature and the public that are supported by Legislative Yuan Speaker Wang Jin-pyng. Therefore, there is no need for new legislation."

On March 23, in a speech addressing the students, President Ma Ying-jeou applauded the students but questioned their decision to occupy government offices, asking:

Is this the sort of democracy we want? Must the rule of law be sacrificed in such a manner? Do we not take pride in our democracy and our respect for rule of law?

The students' association at National Taiwan University called for an education strike, so students could attend protests without disciplinary action from the school. Alumni of the university petitioned for the resignation of Premier Jiang Yi-huah, a former professor there. The sociology departments at National Tsing Hua University and National Taipei University canceled classes in response to the protests. Later, the sociology department of National Sun Yat-Sen University followed suit. In total, 45 student organizations from 18 universities backed the call to strike.

The General Chamber of Commerce of the Republic of China (ROCCOC) held a press conference with representatives from 50 impacted service industries on March 26 to express their support for the trade pact. There are 122 associations covering more than 100,000 businesses within ROCCOC. Approximately 85 percent of ROCCOC's members might be impacted by the cross-strait pact. ROCCOC chairman Lai Chang-yi said Taiwan should not be afraid of competing with global businesses. By establishing bases in China, he stated, Taiwan's businesses have the opportunity to globalize. The Bankers Association of the Republic of China (BAROC) held a supervisors and management meeting on March 27, and the chairman of BAROC Lee Jih-Chu on behalf of all members of BAROC issued three statements to support the trade pact after the meeting.

The Ministry of Economic Affairs held presentations explaining the Cross-Strait Service Trade Agreement at multiple universities across northern Taiwan.

Some protesters feared the agreement would eventually result in the absorption of Taiwan by China, mirroring the accession of Crimea to the Russian Federation.

In a speech to the Chinese National Association of Industry and Commerce on June 10, then Premier Jiang Yi-huah criticized the movement, saying protestors were people who "complain all day long about the government" and "blame others for their failures."

=== In China ===
China's state-run Xinhua News Agency criticized the student-led protests for being violent.

=== Other countries ===
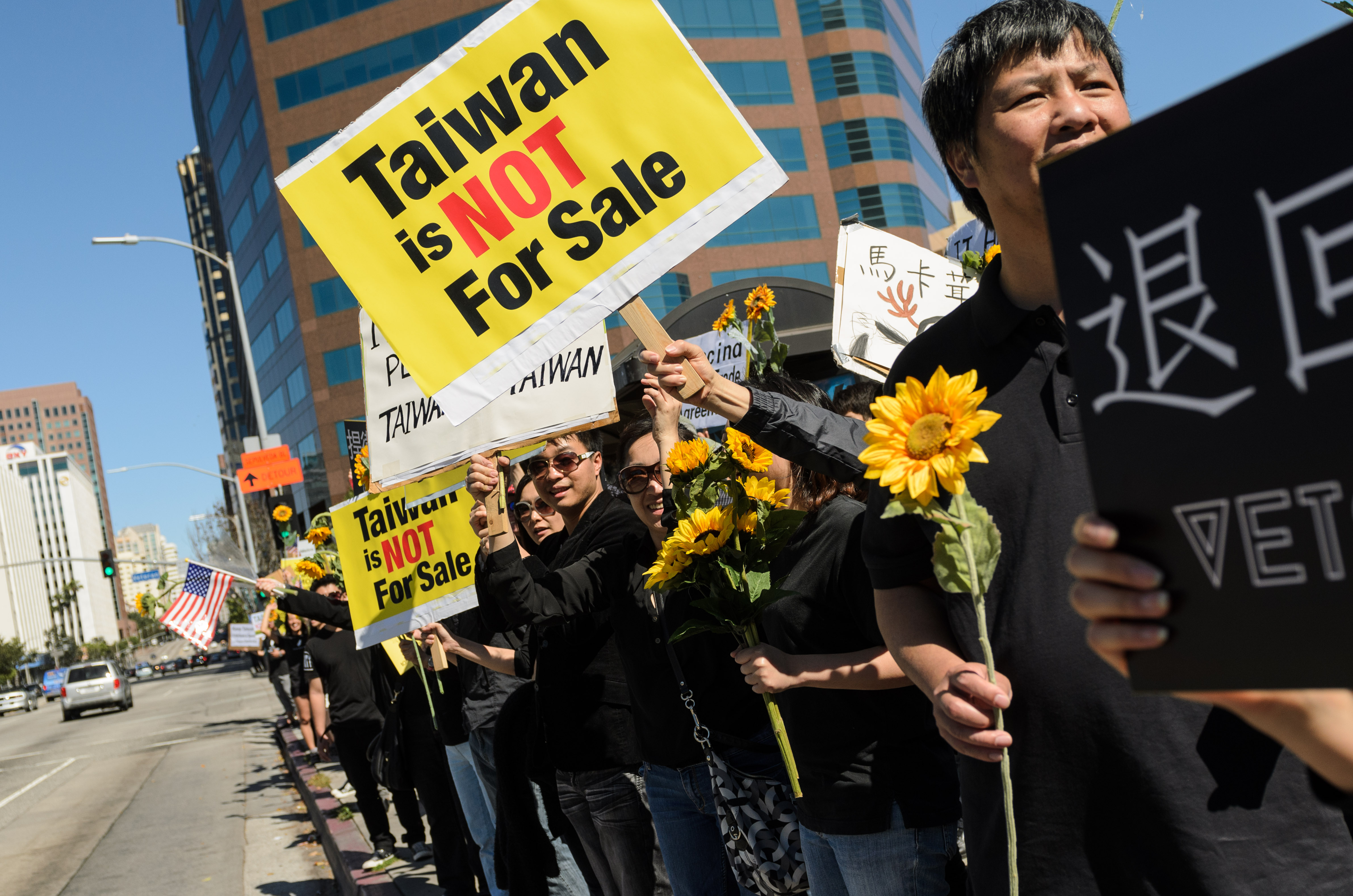
Sunflower Movement supporters in Los Angeles, California

On March 24, the U.S. State Department commented on the issue, saying that the U.S. hopes discussions on the trade pact can be carried out civilly and peacefully. U.S. Senator Sherrod Brown, who is a founding member of the Congressional Taiwan Caucus, urged Ma to ensure a non-violent, peaceful resolution:

My thoughts are with Taiwanese students and other protesters expressing opposition to a proposed economic pact with China. The world is watching these courageous students. The message to President Ma is that when you try to jam a trade agreement through, people will resist.

Amnesty International issued a statement on March 19 urging restraint in the police response.

Overseas Taiwanese in the United States and the United Kingdom have demonstrated in support of the student movement. On March 29 and 30, rallies were held in 49 cities in 21 countries to show support for the Sunflower Movement.

The BBC commented that this movement could be a further democratization of Taiwan, with additional safeguards to let the people, not any political party, decide the fate of Taiwan.

Polish media group Niezalezna – which owns several print and online news outlets in Poland, including the daily Gazeta Polska Codziennie, the weekly Gazeta Polska and the monthly Nowe Panstwo — received a letter from the Taipei Economic and Cultural Bureau in Poland, protesting its use of an analogy between the occupation of the Executive Yuan compound by protesters and the consequent violent crackdown by police and the occupation of the central square, Maidan, in the Ukrainian capital, Kyiv, by protesters who were also treated brutally by the police. Hanna Shen, the journalist who wrote the story and other reports about the movement, expressed shock about receiving the letter:

My newspaper has been publishing articles very critical of the governments of Russia, China and the former Ukrainian government, but we never received any letter from the representative offices of those countries asking us to retract anything. I personally think this letter, as an attempt to influence, to control the way media in free and democratic Poland writes about Taiwan, is not acceptable. [M]any media outlets around the world – including in Germany and in the US – have also made the same analogy in their reports.

Tang Prize recipient Yu Ying-shih expressed support for the movement in a speech on September 20, 2014. He lauded the students' intentions and further commented that all citizens of a democracy should make their concerns known and vote.

== Longer term impact ==
Following the election of DPP candidate Tsai Ing-Wen to president in 2016, China quickly cut all links with her government. Tsai stepped down as chair of the DPP while remaining president of Taiwan; however, the DPP retained control of the National Legislature. In the 2018 local elections, the KMT had a stronger showing;

The Sunflower Movement involved many enthusiastic activists who wanted to create movement parties, often with the goal of greater independence from China. The New Power Party was the most successful of these, and managed to retain three seats in the legislature following the 2020 national election. By then, many members were maturing into young politicians and joining the DPP or TPP. No NPP candidates survived the 2024 national elections. The total party vote was only 2.57 percent.

According to Ho Ming-sho, professor of sociology at National Taiwan University (writing in Think China):

As one of the most consequential social protests in postwar Taiwan, the Sunflower Movement left behind many longstanding impacts... My assessment is that the Sunflower legacy largely stayed intact, in that the unprecedented three presidential wins in a row [of Tsai Ing-wen] signify a strong determination to reject being locked into a China-centered political economy.

== Gallery ==
See also: A Visual Dialogue of the 2014 Sunflower Movement, 5 Years Later
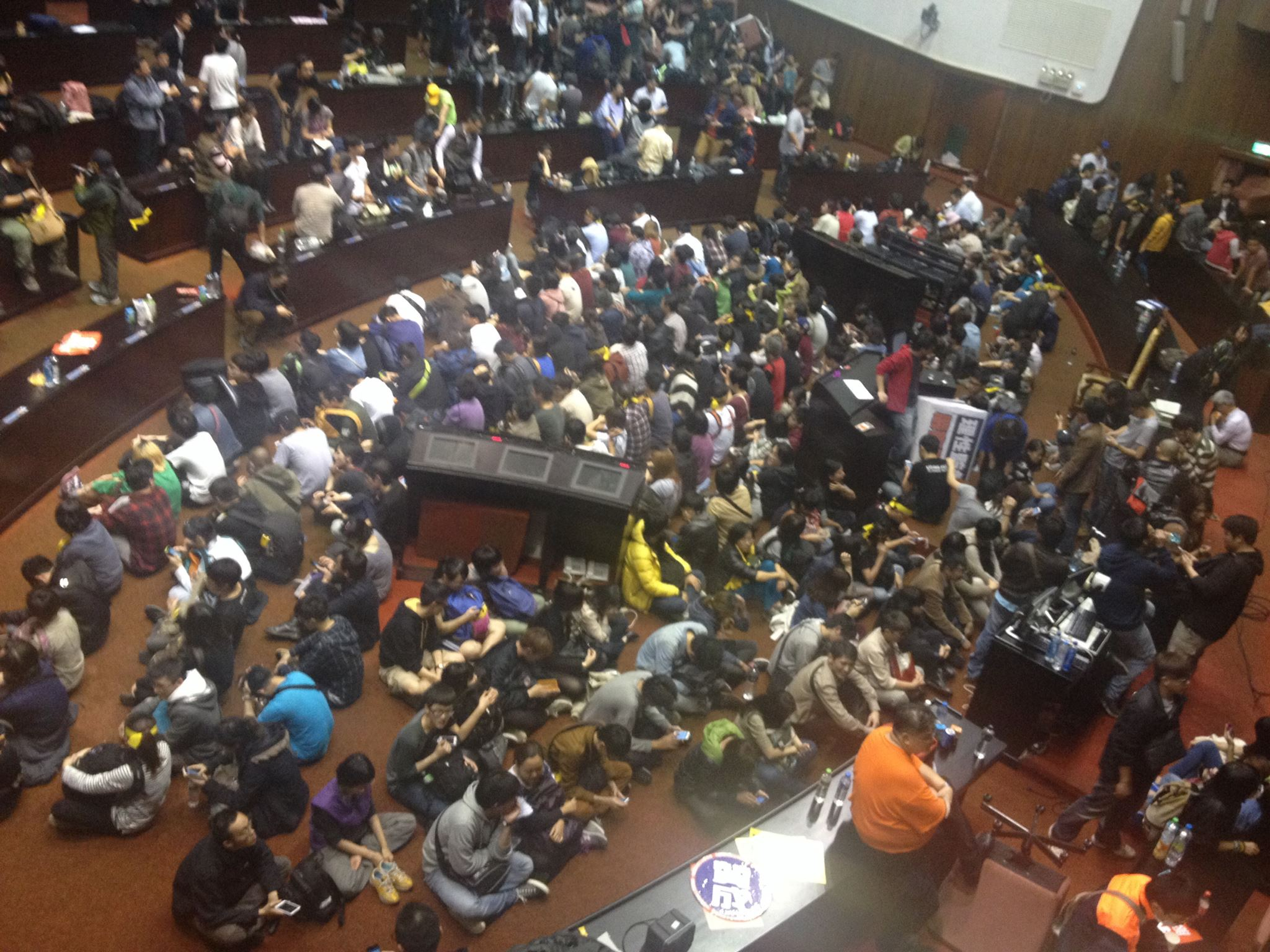
View from above

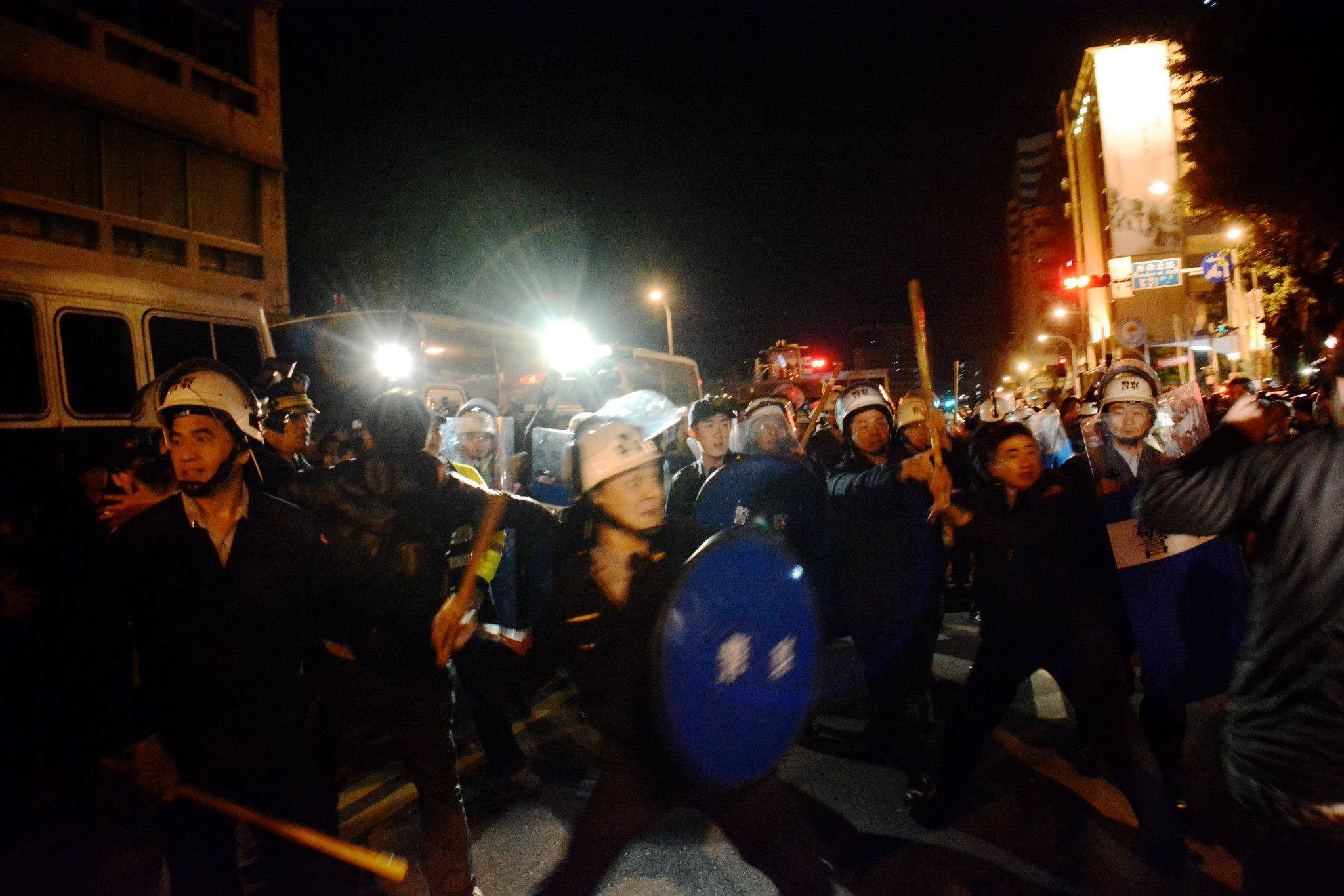
Police evicting protesters outside of EY

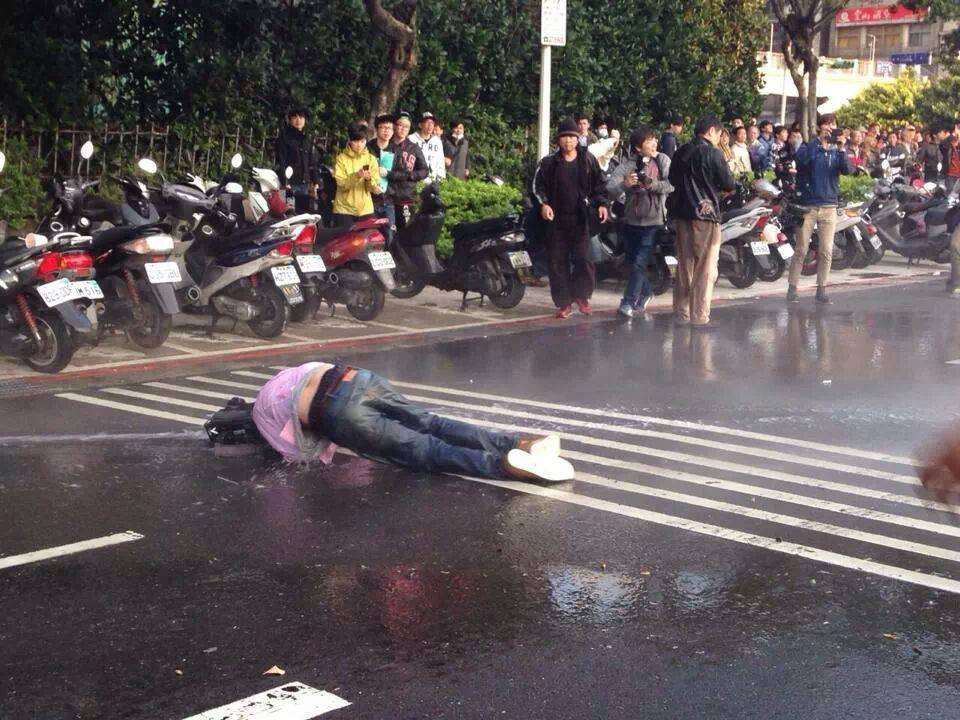
Protester struck by water cannon
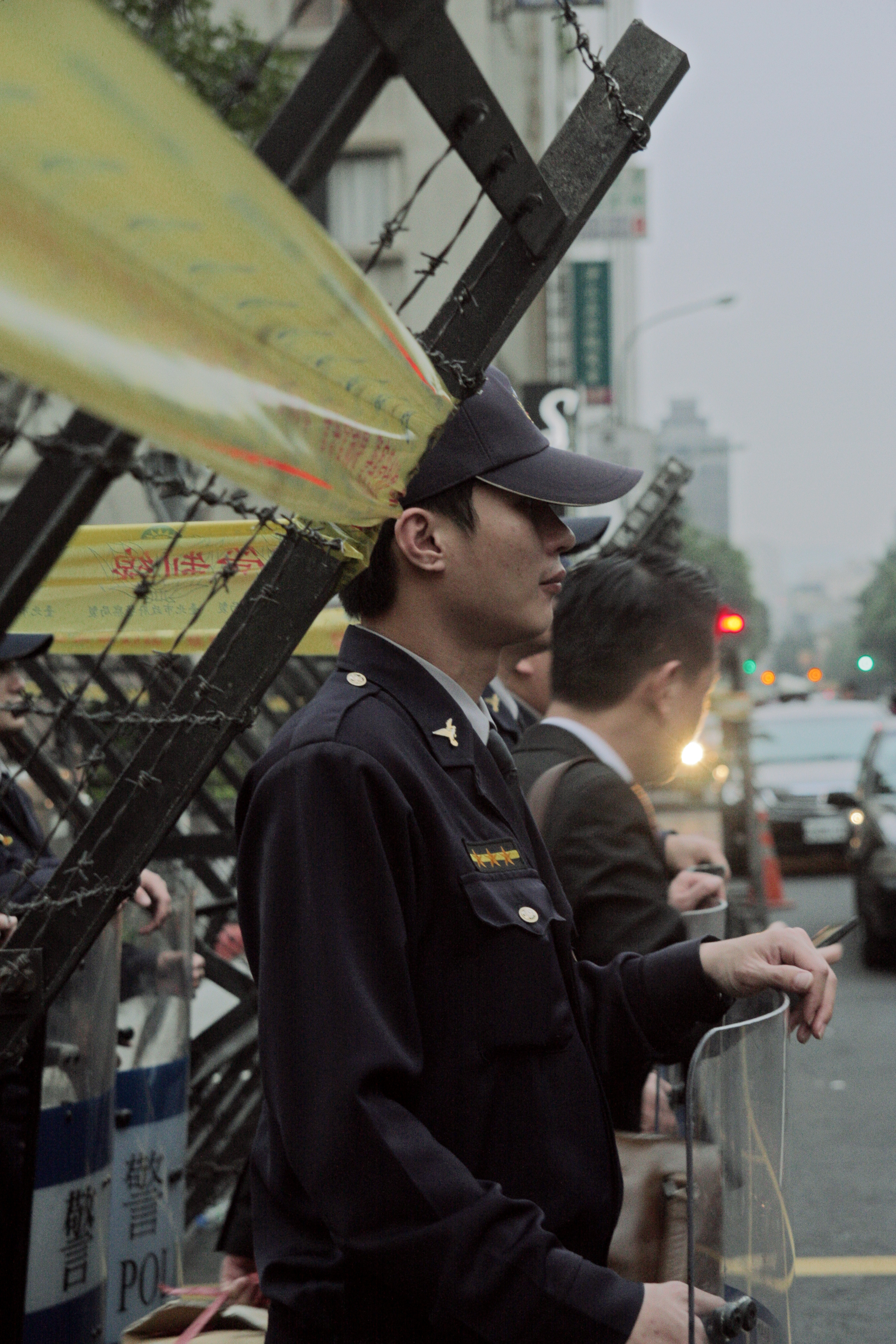
A police officer stands guard

== See also ==
- Cross-Strait relations
- Digital democracy in Taiwan
- Wild Lily student movement
- Wild Strawberries Movement
- May 1968 events in France, Paris, France
- Referendums in Taiwan
- February 28 Incident
- Umbrella Movement
- 2020 Thai protests
- List of protests in the 21st century
- Today Hong Kong Tomorrow Taiwan - The slogan of this movement.
