= Jerzy Janicki Bench =

Sculpture in Warsaw, Poland

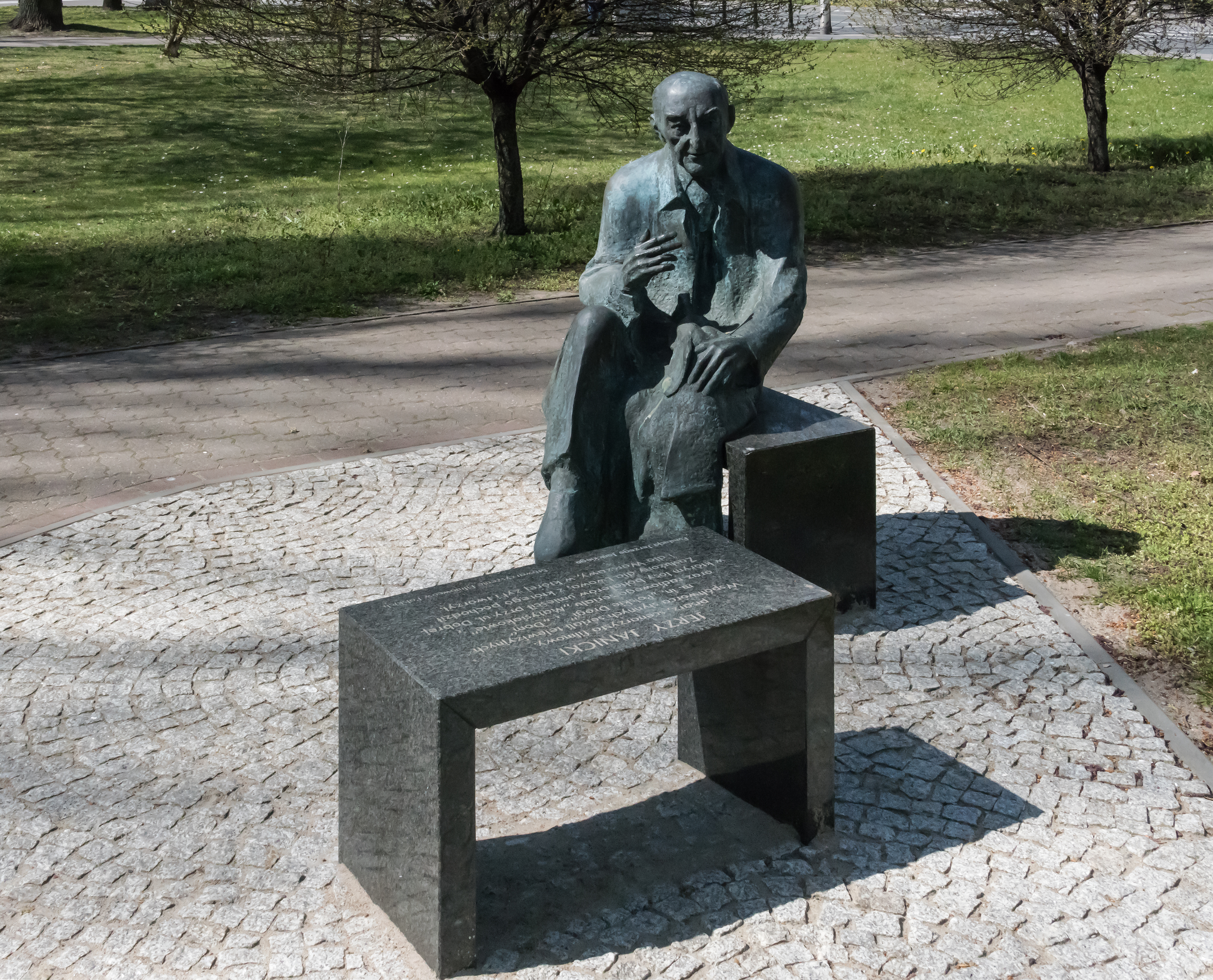
- The sculpture 2020.
- Interactive map of Jerzy Janicki Bench
- Location: Downtown, Warsaw, Poland
- Coordinates: 52.230350°N 21.034044°E
- Designer: Antoni Janusz Pastwa
- Type: Statue, bench monument
- Material: Bronze (statue); Granite (bench)
- Opening date: 10 October 2019
- Dedicated to: Jerzy Janicki

The Jerzy Janicki Bench (Polish: Ławeczka Jerzego Janickiego) is a bronze statue in Warsaw, Poland, located at the intersection of Czerniakowska and Ludna Streets, within the neighbourhood of Solec, in the Downtown district. The monument is dedicated to Jerzy Janicki, a 20th-century scriptwriter, best known for his work at television series Polish Roads and Home, as well as radio drama series The Matysiaks. It was designed by Antoni Janusz Pastwa, and unveiled on 10 October 2019.

== History ==
The monument was dedicated to Jerzy Janicki (1928–2007), a 20th-century scriptwriter, best known for his work at television series Polish Roads and Home, as well as radio drama series The Matysiaks. The sculpture was proposed and financed by the Polish Filmmakers Association and the Jerzy Janicki Foundation. The sculpture designed by Antoni Janusz Pastwa, and unveiled on 10 October 2019, at a small garden square named after Janicki, at the intersection of Czerniakowska and Ludna Streets.

== Design ==
The monument consists of a bronze statue depicting Jerzy Janicki, wearing a winter coat, sitting on a granite one-person bench, in a pose shown talking, and petting a dog sitting next to him. Next to the sculpture is placed an identical small bench. It bears a Polish inscription which reads:

Polish inscription

Jerzy Janicki
pisarz, scenarzysta filmowy
Współtwórca słynnych seriali telewizyjnych
m. in. „Polskie drogi”, „Dom”
oraz radiowego serialu „Masysiakowie”
w którym losy bohaterów umieścił przy ulicy Dobrej
Zasłużony dla Lwowa, z którego pochodził
i dla Warszawy, w której żył i tworzył
Stowarzyszenie Filmowców Polskich

Translation:
English translation

Jerzy Janicki
Writer, film scriptwriter
Co-creator of famous television series
such as "Polish Roads", "Home",
and radio drama "The Matysiaks",
which characters' lives he placed at Dobra Street
Distinguished to Lviv, from which he came,
and to Warsaw, where he lived and created
Polish Filmmakers Association

== Gallery ==
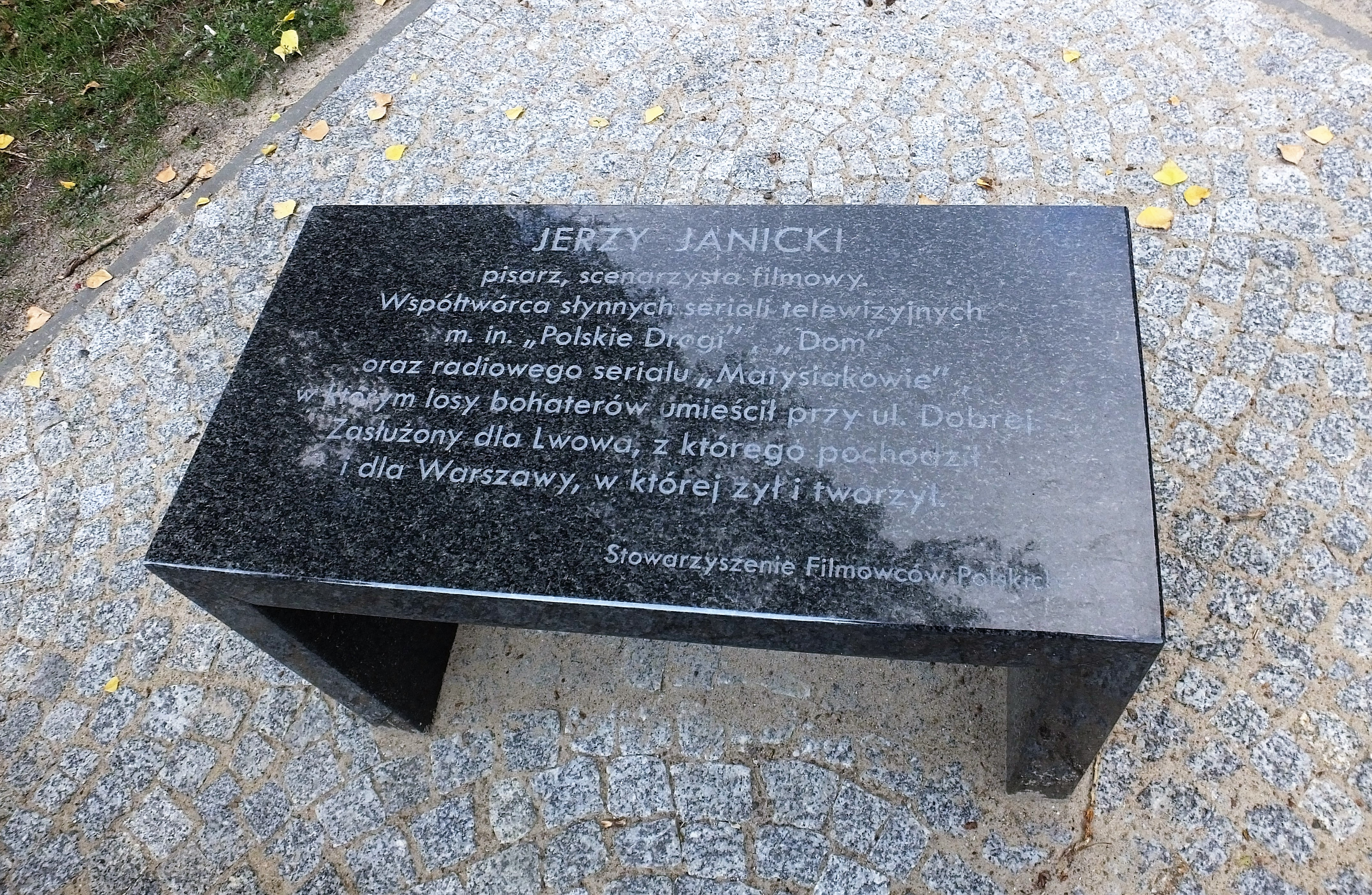
Inscription on a bench.
