= Jedynka =

Jedynka may refer to:

- Polskie Radio Program I, a Polish radio station also called Radio Jedynka
- TVP1, a Polish television station also called Jedynka
