= Polactwo =

2004 book by Rafał A. Ziemkiewicz

- Author: Rafał Ziemkiewicz
- Publisher: Fabryka Słów
- Publication date: 2004
- ISBN: 9788389011411

Polactwo (literally "Polackness") is a book by Rafał Ziemkiewicz, published in 2004 and 2007.

The author tries to explain what happened with Poles after the fall of communism and the toxic influence of decades of communism and the destruction it brought to Poland. He tells about the destructive force of people gathered around Adam Michnik – an argument which he follows in his book Michnikowszczyzna. Zapis choroby. He tries to describe the reasons and effects of low self-esteem of Poles as a nation, who regard themselves low in sociological studies.

According to Ziemkiewicz, the reasons are processes that shaped the society through the years of partitions and communism. He says the social situation is similar to that of other post-communist countries, and also post-slavery societies.
