= W Jezioranach =

1960 Polish radio drama

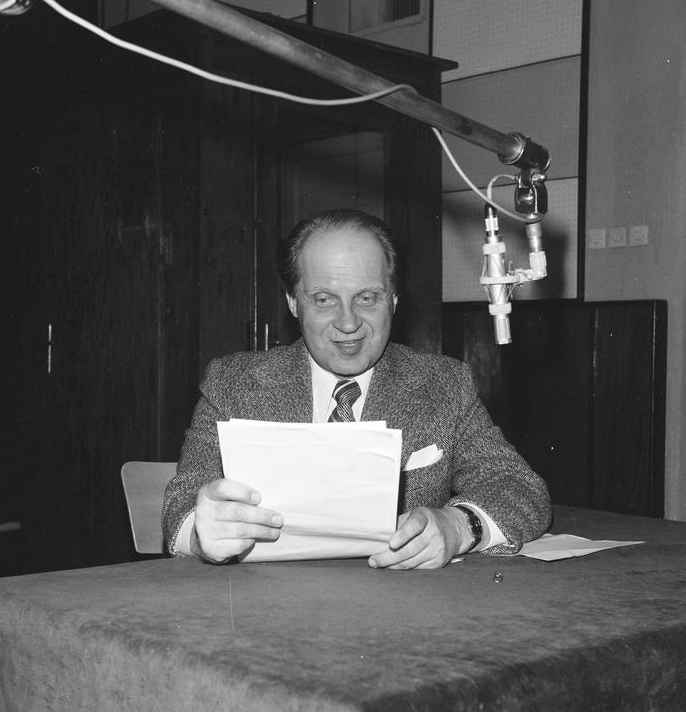

W Jezioranach (In Jeziorany) is a popular Polish radio drama. It began in 1960 and has continued to the present with one 30-minute episode every week on Program 1 of Polskie Radio. The series tells a story of an average Polish rural family, in the fictional village of Jeziorany, near Puławy. It was conceptualized as a rural counterpart to urban Matysiakowie.

Alongside Matysiakowie it has been called one of the most enduring Polish radio dramas. Due to its long running status the show has been called "legendary" and described as having a "cult status".

3,376 episodes have aired as of July 12, 2026.
