= Sakiewicz =

Sakiewicz is a Polish surname. Notable people with the surname include:

- Nick Sakiewicz (born 1961), American business executive
- Tomasz Sakiewicz (born 1967), Polish right-wing activist and journalist
