= Miłosz Kłeczek =

Polish journalist and publicist

- Miłosz Kłeczek, 2020
- Born: Miłosz Krzysztof Kłeczek; 15 January 1987 (age 39); Częstochowa
- Occupations: Journalist; reporter
- Years active: 2008–present
- Employer(s): TVN24, TVP, TV Republika
- Known for: Conservative political commentary in Poland

Miłosz Krzysztof Kłeczek (born 15 January 1987) is a Polish journalist, reporter and television columnist.

== Career ==
Kłeczek is a Polish television journalist, reporter, and presenter of news and current affairs programs, professionally affiliated with Telewizja Polska (2016–2023) and TV Republika (after 2023). Urodził się 15 stycznia 1987 roku w Częstochowie. His professional career in the media began in 2008. Early in his career, he worked for the radio station Jedynka, as well as the television channels TVN24, TVN Meteo, and TTV. At TVN Meteo, he hosted, among other things, the news program Meteo News. From 2014 to 2016, he worked as a reporter for Superstacja, where he covered political and social events. In February and March 2014, he served as a correspondent for Superstacja in Ukraine, where he reported on events related to the political situation in the country at that time. In June 2016, he began working as a reporter for Telewizja Polska, joining the news team at TVP Info. At TVP Info, he focused primarily on parliamentary affairs, and in October 2019, he made his debut as a presenter for the channel’s news segments. In the first half of 2020, he hosted the program Kasta (Caste), broadcast on TVP Info, which focused on issues surrounding the functioning of the justice system. From October 2021, he hosted his own current-affairs program, Układ (The Backroom Deal), broadcast on TVP3. During his time at TVP, he also hosted the programs Woronicza 17 and Strefa starcia (Conflict Zone) on the TVP Info channel. In August 2023, he became the host of the current affairs program Polska mówi (Poland Speaks), broadcast on TVP1 in the period leading up to the parliamentary elections. In 2023, he also co-hosted the program Arena poglądów (Arena of Views) alongside Magdalena Ogórek, which focused on current political and social issues. In 2021, he was nominated for a Public Media Award in the "Image" category for standing up in defense of those who have been wronged while hosting the program Kasta.

In September 2021, the Media Ethics Council, upon reviewing his hosting of the program O tym się mówi (People Are Talking About This), concluded that the principles of journalistic objectivity and fairness had been violated in the manner in which an interview with Senator Kazimierz Kleina was conducted. In March 2022, the Media Ethics Council determined that a report prepared by Kłeczek regarding workplace bullying in the Senate of the Republic of Poland violated the principles of truth, objectivity, the separation of news from commentary, and respect and tolerance.

After ending his collaboration with TVP at the end of 2023, he joined the team at TV Republika in January 2024, taking on the roles of parliamentary reporter and host of current affairs programs. In February 2024, he was given two original current-affairs programs on TV Republika: Miłosz Kłeczek zaprasza (Miłosz Kłeczek Invites), aired from Tuesday to Friday, and Wysokie napięcie (High Voltage), broadcast on Sundays. In May 2024, he began hosting the program Miłosz Kłeczek. W ruchu (Miłosz Kłeczek. In Motion), which combines conversations with invited politicians with physical activity; for this work, he received an award from the Association of Polish Journalists in 2026. In September 2026, he announced that his afternoon program on TV Republika would be renamed Miłosz Kłeczek. Z półobrotu ("Miłosz Kłeczek. With a Roundhouse Kick"), indicating that it would continue to cover political topics, albeit in a modified format.
