= Stanisława Perzanowska =

Polish actress (1898–1982)

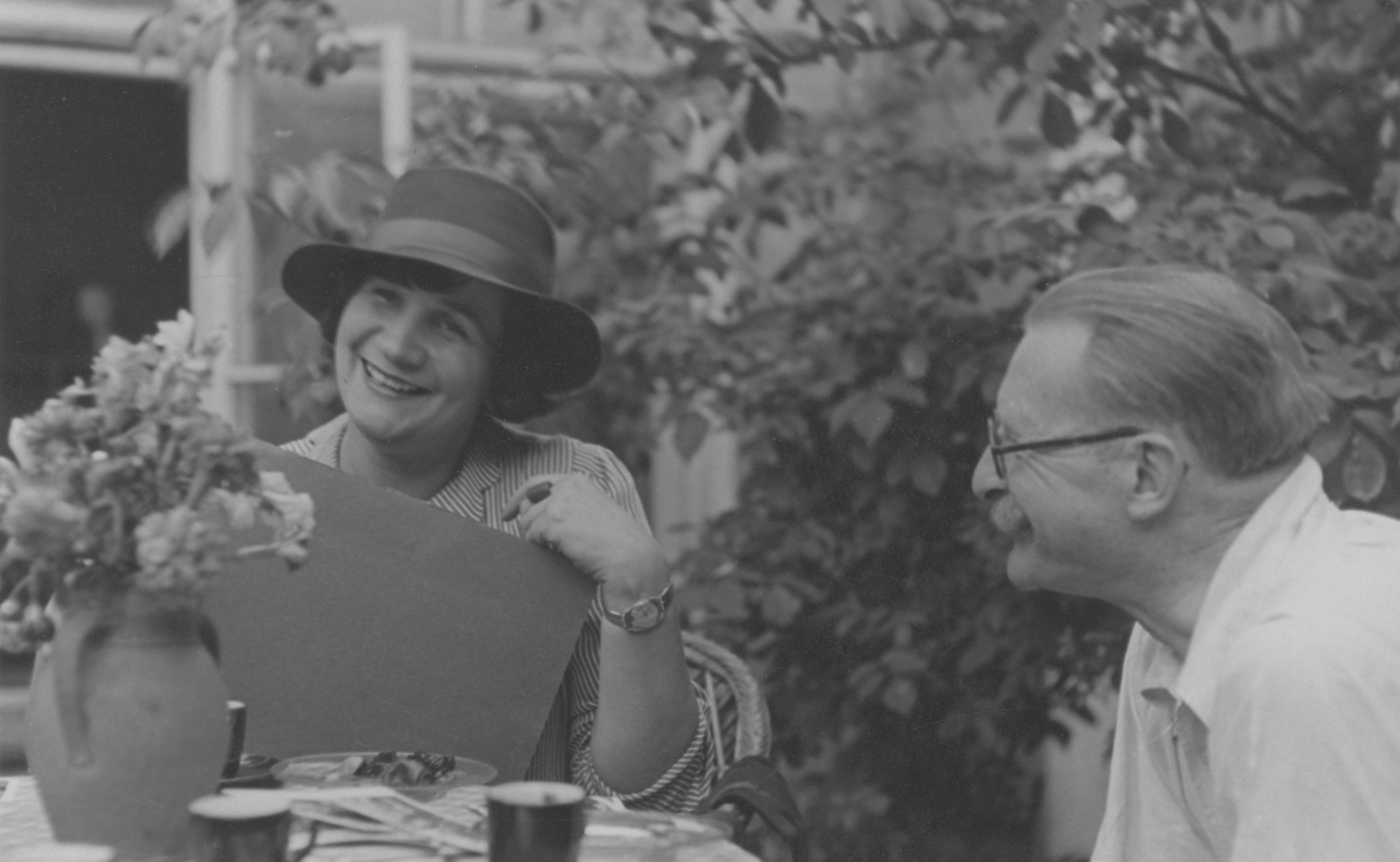
- Born: 2 July 1898; Warsaw
- Died: 24 May 1982 (aged 83); Warsaw
- Occupations: Actress, director
- Spouse: Zygmunt Chmielewski

Stanisława Perzanowska (2 July 1898 in Warsaw – 24 May 1982 in Warsaw) was a Polish actress, theater and film director, professor at the National Higher School of Theatre in Warsaw.

== Education and Career ==
She graduated from the Warsaw Dramatic School in 1919 and immediately started working for the Warsaw-based Teatr Reduta. She also collaborated with the Ateneum Theatre in Warsaw, Polish Theater in Vilnius, Silesian Theatre in Katowice, National Theatre and Teatr Współczesny in Warsaw.

Stanisława Perzanowska starred in several films, both before and after World War II. She was also well known for his role as Helena Matysiak in the popular radio drama The Matysiaks .

== Selected filmography ==
Actress

- 1933: Romeo i Julcia
- 1934: Córka generała Pankratowa
- 1954: Niedaleko Warszawy

Director

- 1936: Jego wielka miłość (directed by Stanisława Perzanowska and Mieczysław Krawicz)
