= Today Hong Kong, Tomorrow Taiwan =

Taiwanese political slogan

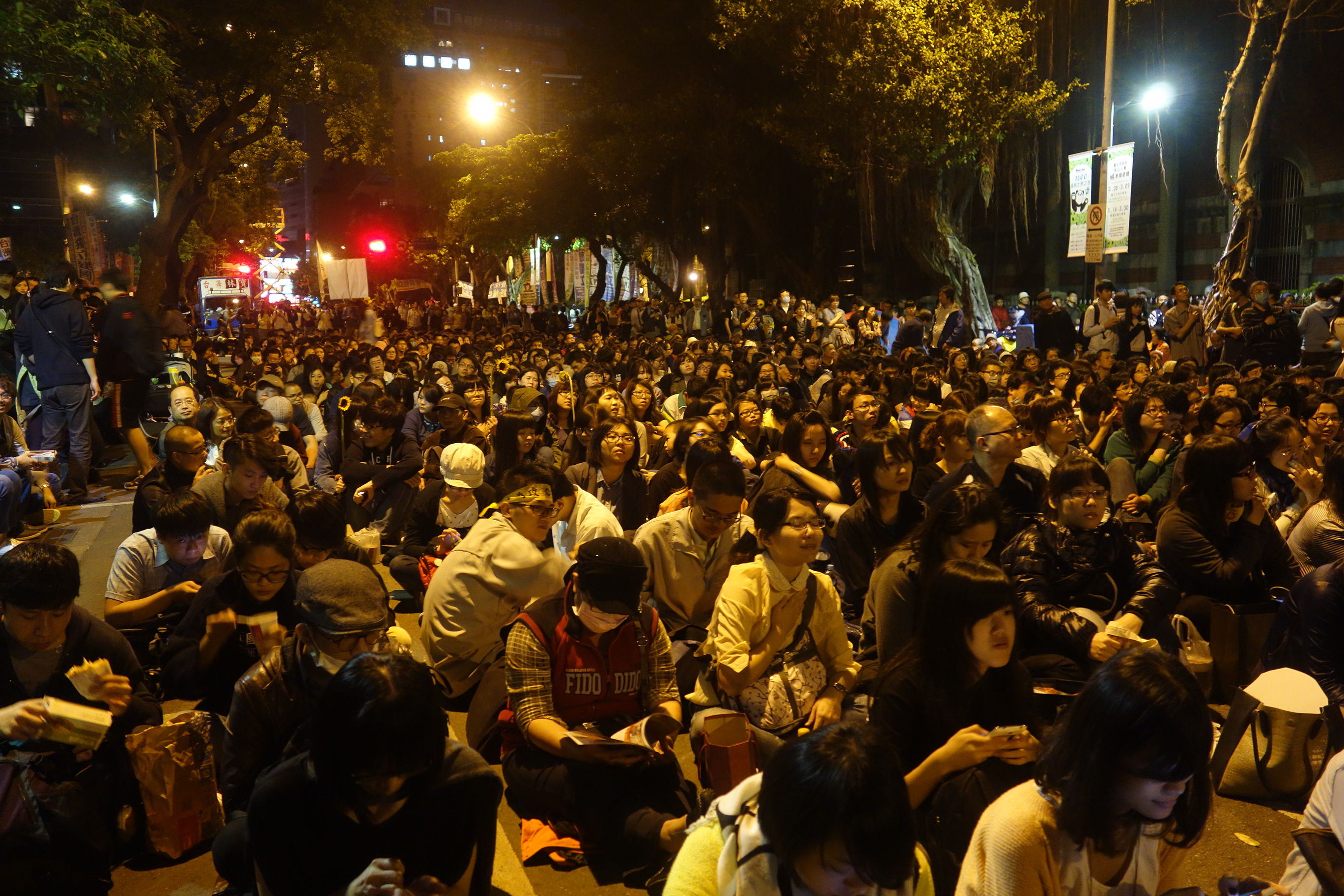
- Traditional Chinese: 今日香港，明日臺灣 or 台灣
- Simplified Chinese: 今日香港，明日台湾
Transcriptions
Standard Mandarin
- Hanyu Pinyin: jīnrì xiānggǎng, míngrì táiwān
- Wade–Giles: chin^{1}jih^{4} Hsiang^{1}kang^{3} ming^{2}jih^{4} Tʻai^{2}wan^{1}
Yue: Cantonese
- Jyutping: gam1jat6 hoeng1gong2，ming4jat6 toi4waan1

Today Hong Kong, Tomorrow Taiwan was a slogan used during Taiwan's Sunflower Student Movement in April 2014, expressing concerns over Taiwan's future relationship with China and drawing parallels with developments in Hong Kong after its handover to China.

The slogan emphasized the need for Taiwan to be cautious about potential negative impacts of the Cross-Strait Service Trade Agreement (CSSTA), including the risk of economic dependency on China. The movement highlighted issues in Hong Kong, such as suppressed wages, the property bubble, worsening wealth inequality, Beijing's influence on Hong Kong's policies and conflicts between mainland China and Hong Kong across various sectors. Eventually, this slogan became a symbol of the shared destiny of Hong Kong and Taiwan.

Li Yi, the founder of The Seventies, a monthly magazine, reflected on the 30-year evolution of the phrase, comparing Hong Kong's development in the 17 years post-handover with developments in Taiwan. He noted that while Taiwan's democracy seemed unimpressive and its economic development lagged behind mainland China and Hong Kong, Taiwan's civil society was maturing with greater autonomy. This contrasted with the regression seen in Hong Kong's civil society and government institutions under pressure from the Chinese Communist Party and mainland Chinese interests. The Sunflower Movement resonated amongst Hongkongers, who shared messages of support and sympathy through Facebook and was heavily covered in local news.

In response to the 2014 Sunflower Movement, another slogan emerged: "Today Taiwan, Tomorrow Hong Kong." The president of the Chinese University of Hong Kong's Student Union, Tommy Cheung Sau-yin, suggested that after Taiwan using Hong Kong's situation as a warning, it was probable that Hong Kong would experience its own social movement, possibly following a similar model. He predicted Hong Kong could use similar protest tactics to prepare for the occupation of Central, with Taiwan's protests serving as a template for Hong Kong. The Sunflower Movement, sparked by the CSSTA, reminded Hongkongers of the negative feelings they had towards the Mainland and Mainland and Hong Kong Closer Economic Partnership Arrangement (CEPA).

According to Ta Kung Pao, Hong Kong opposition groups threatened to adopt the methods of Taiwan's Sunflower Movement to occupy the Hong Kong Legislative Council, under the slogan "Today's Taiwan, Tomorrow's Hong Kong". Commentator Tsang Chi-ho described Hong Kong as a "demonstration unit" where, after being reclaimed by mainland China, human rights, freedoms, and the rule of law were replaced by the slogan "Love Socialist China". He hoped Taiwan would become a model for Hongkongers to emulate in their own struggle, flipping the narrative to "Today's Taiwan, Tomorrow's Hong Kong".

The same year the 2014 Legislative Council occupation incident happened in Hong Kong.

In Japan, a new slogan was adapted from the phrase: "Today Hong Kong, Tomorrow Taiwan, Day After Tomorrow Okinawa".

== See also ==
- Sunflower Student Movement
- Umbrella Movement
