= Pieprzony los Kataryniarza =

1995 novel by Rafał A. Ziemkiewicz

Pieprzony los Kataryniarza ("The Screwed-up Fate of an Organ-Grinder") is a 1995 science fiction novel by the Polish science fiction writer Rafał Ziemkiewicz. It was published in Poland by superNOWA. The novel received the prime Polish award for science-fiction literature, Janusz A. Zajdel Award, in 1995.

The novel has a cyberpunk theme. It is set in the 21st century Poland, and its protagonist is a hacker who suddenly stumbles upon documents that may affect the future of Europe and the world.

In the world of the novel, "organ-grinder" is a slang term for the "indirect controller", an operator of the World Net, whose actions resemble the kranking of the street organ.

== Reviews ==
- (in Polish) Wojciech Orliński, "Pieprzony los kataryniarza" Rafała A. Ziemkiewicza, 9 October 2003, Gazeta Wyborcza
- (in Polish) Kawerna.pl
