= Rafał Ziemkiewicz =

Polish writer

Rafał A. Ziemkiewicz
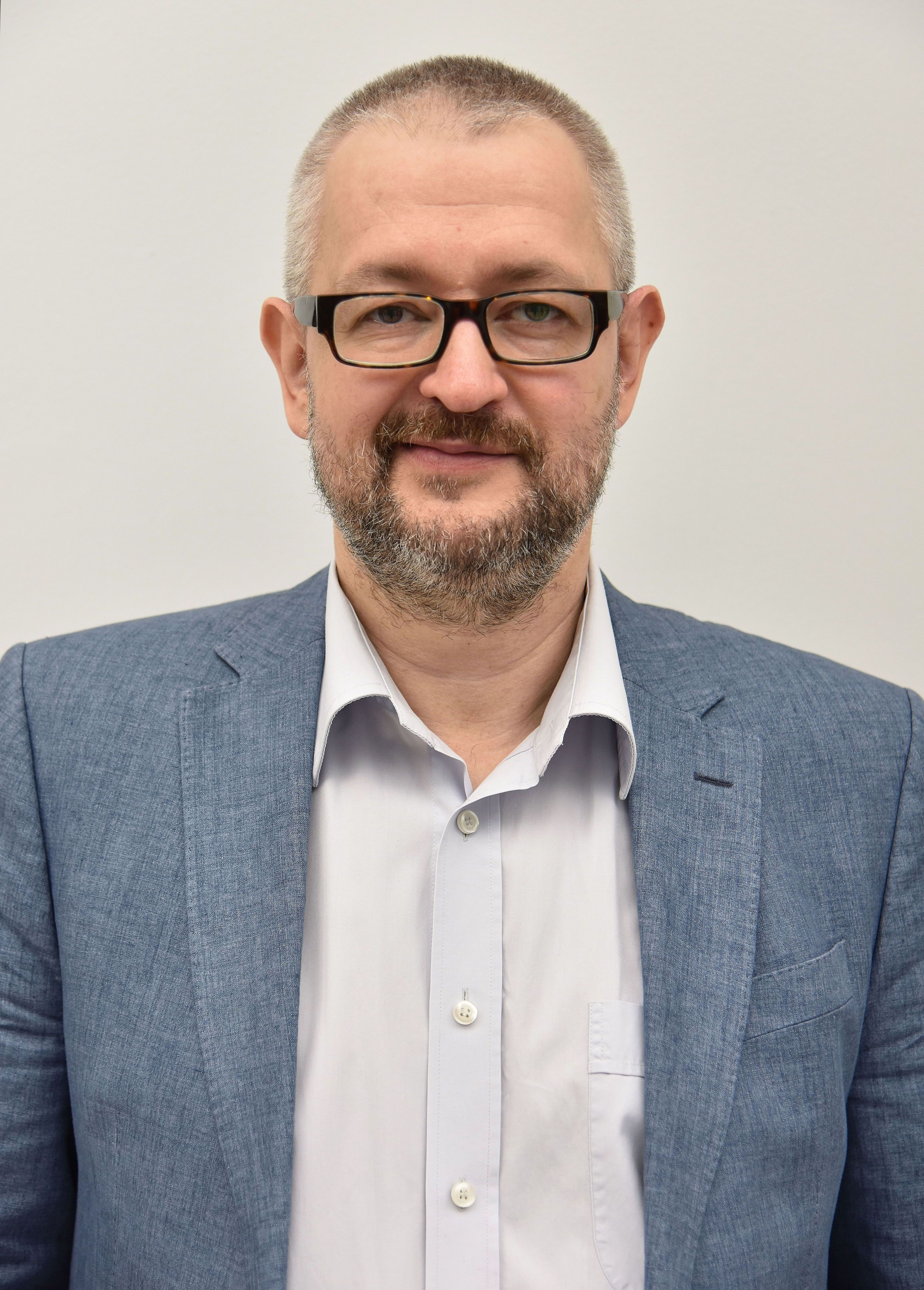
- Born: Rafał Aleksander Ziemkiewicz; 13 September 1964 (age 62); Piaseczno, Poland
- Education: University of Warsaw
- Occupation: Writer
- Spouse: Aleksandra Ciejek
- Children: 2 (daughters)
- Writing career
- Genres: Political fiction, science fiction, journalist

Signature
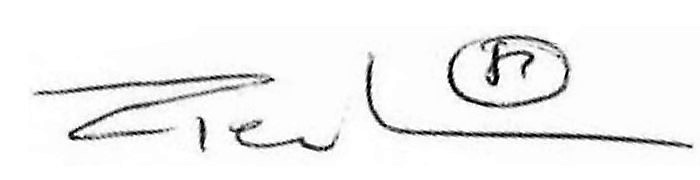

Rafał Aleksander Ziemkiewicz (born 13 September 1964, in Piaseczno) is a Polish political and science fiction author and right-wing publicist. Winner of the Janusz A. Zajdel Award (1995, 1998 in novels category and 1996 for short stories). Recipient of the ESFS award for Best Author for 1997.

== Biography ==
=== Science-fiction writer ===
In 1984, during his studies at the University of Warsaw (Polish language and literature), he joined SFAN science fiction fan association and started writing short stories. His first science-fiction short story was Z palcem na spuście (1982), followed by his book debut Władca szczurów (Warsaw) (1987). He also worked for two Polish science-fiction magazines: Fantastyka (1986–1990) and as a chief editor for Fenix (1990–1993). For his novels Pieprzony los kataryniarza (1995) and Walc stulecia (1998), as well as his short story Śpiąca królewna (1996), he was awarded the Zajdel Award, the most prestigious Polish award for science fiction and fantasy literature. He was also awarded Śląkfa for Writer of a Year in 1990 and 1998.

A popular theme in his works is the fate of Poland and more broadly, Europe, in the near future (from several to several dozen years). His books often paint the future in dark colors, showing the Commonwealth of Independent States disintegrate into a civil war, European Union becoming powerless in the face of Islamic terrorism, and predatory capitalism and political correctness taken ad absurdum leading to the erosion of morality and ethics. Thus his books are often classified as political fiction and social science fiction, although they are not seen as dystopian fiction.

=== Journalist and publicist ===
After the fall of communism, Ziemkiewicz became a conservative journalist and essayist. He began this career in the early 1990s as a publicist for Najwyższy Czas! weekly magazine. Until February 1997, Ziemkiewicz wrote political and socio-economical essays for Gazeta Polska (1993–1997). He was also a columnist of the Polish magazine Wprost (2001–2003) and the Polish edition of Newsweek (2003–2007), and occasionally published essays in Polityka. Currently his columns are being published in Rzeczpospolita, Uważam Rze, Gazeta Polska, Niezależna Gazeta Polska and Interia.pl webportal. Many of his essays have been collected and published in book format. In 2001 he won the Kisiel Prize.

Ziemkiewicz has worked as a radio journalist, working for Radio WAWA and Polskie Radio Program IV in the 1990s, Radio TOK FM in the early 2000s, later with Radio VOX FM and Program 1 Polskiego Radia. He hosts a television talkshow on TVP Info and a program on TVP Historia.

He was a spokesman for the Real Politics Union (Unia Polityki Realnej) party (1993–1994). In 1995, as a stipendiary of the National Forum Foundation he worked for the Republican Party in the United States.

In September 2006, Ziemkiewicz published an article in the Polish edition of Newsweek criticizing the editor-in-chief of Gazeta Wyborcza, Adam Michnik; Michnik brought a civil suit against Ziemkiewicz, which was settled in 2007 after Ziemkiewicz agreed to publish an apology.

In 2018, he cancelled a planned speaking tour in the UK following appeals by activists and politicians to the Home Office to block his entry due to hate speech concerns. In the wake of the event, Ziemkiewicz tweeted that he would no longer be coming to the UK, describing Britain as “fascist”.

The same year, the Kantor Center at Tel Aviv University published an annual report on antisemitism, which included, among others, Ziemkiewicz's statements. According to Ziemkiewicz, he was being regularly included on “Jewish lists”, and from his perspective it was a “professional success - something like winning the "crown of Sinai”. At the same time, he stated that the content of the report that concerned him was untrue. Ziemkiwiecz also attacked Rafał Pankowski, a Polish sociologist and political scientist, by calling him a “snitch”, as he was the one who stood for the Polish part of the report. He also attacked Pankowski on public TV in 2019.

In 2019 during a talk show his statements were judged to be defamatory, but his conviction was overturned by presidential pardon in 2023.

In 2020, he published Cham niezbuntowany which some considered antisemitic and instigating hatred. The anti-racist watchdog Open Republic Association said that the book contained examples of criminal hate speech, such as when it describes Israeli children as being molded into "killing machines" by "Holocaust, or rather myth of Holocaust" which they interpreted as Holocaust denial. Ziemkiewicz denied the accusations and said that the main themes of his books are completely different. Addressing the accusations, he further stated that he never denied the Holocaust, and that he simply wrote that, in addition to the Holocaust, there is also a myth of the Holocaust. He argued that, if he writes about the myth of the Polish Warsaw Uprising, he is not denying the fact of the Uprising.

== Bibliography ==
=== Fiction ===
- Władca szczurów Warsaw, 1987 (short stories anthology)
- Skarby stolinów Warsaw, 1990 (second edition in 1993) (short stories anthology)
- Zero złudzeń Białowieża, 1991 (short stories anthology)
- Wybrańcy Bogów Warsaw, 1991 (second edition in 2000)
- Pieprzony los Kataryniarza Warsaw, 1995
- Czerwone dywany, odmierzony krok Warsaw, 1996
- Walc Stulecia Warsaw, 1998 (second edition in 2010)
- Cała kupa wielkich braci Lublin, 2002 (short stories anthology)
- Ciało obce Warsaw, 2005
- Ognie na skałach Lublin, 2005
- Coś mocniejszego Lublin, 2006 (short stories anthology)
- Żywina (2008)
- Zgred (2011)
- Władca Szczurów (juvenilia), 2012

=== Non-fiction ===
- Zero zdziwień Warsaw, 1995 (essays)
- Viagra mać Warsaw, 2002 (essays)
- Frajerzy Lublin, 2003 (essays)
- Polactwo Lublin, 2004 (essays)
- Michnikowszczyzna. Zapis choroby Lublin, 2006
- Czas wrzeszczących staruszków Lublin, 2008
- W skrócie, 2009
- W sieci, 2009
- Wkurzam salon, 2011
- Myśli nowoczesnego endeka, 2012
- Jakie piękne samobójstwo, 2014
- Złowrogi Cień Marszałka 2017
- Sanacja czy demokracja?, 2018 (essays)
- Cham niezbuntowany, 2020

=== Translations to English ===
His story "Dobra wróżka" has been translated to English by Jolanta Pers and David J. James as “A Fairy” in the Chosen by Fate: Zajdel Award Winners Anthology (2000).

== Awards ==
| Preceded by Andrzej Sapkowski | ESFS award for Best Author; 1997 | Succeeded by James White |

Winner of the Janusz A. Zajdel Award (1995, 1998 in novels category and 1996 for short stories).
