= Walc stulecia =

1998 novel by Rafał A. Ziemkiewicz

Walc Stulecia (Polish for "Waltz of the Century") is a social science fiction novel published in 1998 by the Polish science fiction writer Rafał Ziemkiewicz. It was published in Poland by superNOWA. The novel received the Janusz A. Zajdel Award in 1998.

The book contrasts the society of Belle Époque and a fictional vision of a 21st-century society. Painted in a pessimistic tone, it follows the story of a game developer working on the game entitled "Walc stulecia".
