= Michnikowszczyzna. Zapis choroby =

2006 nonfiction book by Rafał Ziemkiewicz

- Author: Rafał Ziemkiewicz
- Publication date: 2006

Michnikowszczyzna. Zapis choroby is a book written by a Polish right-wing journalist Rafał Ziemkiewicz in 2006. The title might be translated as Michnikism. Medical History. It presents a negative analytical and critical view of Adam Michnik, the founder and editor-in-chief of Gazeta Wyborcza (second biggest daily newspaper in Poland), and Michnik's role within Polish society and in the transformation in Poland after 1989.

In the view of the author, the neologism "Michnikowszczyzna" refers to both Michnik himself, his apprentices and the views presented by Gazeta Wyborcza, The term can be loosely translated as 'Michnikitis'. Ziemkiewicz describes in detail their—in his opinion—excessive and negative impact on the shape of politics in Poland, especially during the 90s. The book and author's thesis were criticized by some authors, especially those associated with Gazeta Wyborcza.

Released in December 2006, it ranked 6th on the January 2007 list of Polish bestselling books. The book has received numerous reviews in Poland, including in Wprost and one in Michnik's own Gazeta Wyborcza by Ewa Milewicz.

== See also ==
- Post-communism
