= Jerzy Janicki =

Polish writer, journalist and scriptwriter

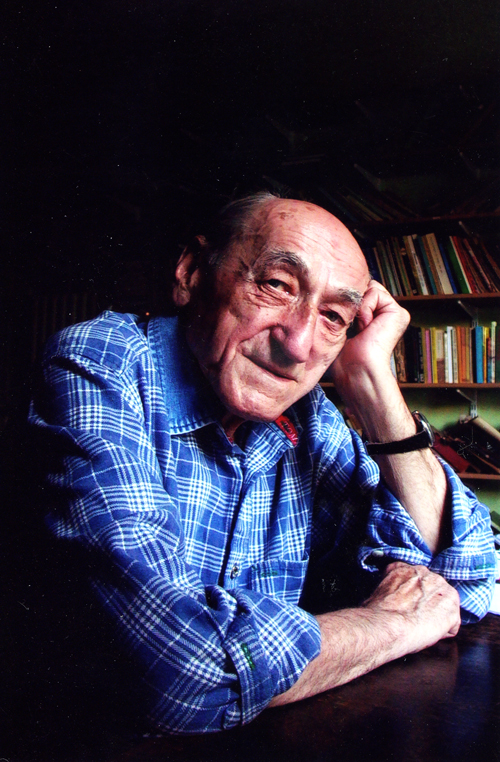
Jerzy Janicki

Jerzy Janicki (1928–2007) was a Polish writer, journalist and scriptwriter. He was the writer of many radio programs, among them the most famous is the radio drama Matysiakowie. He also wrote many books about Kresy, particularly about the city of Lwów (now Lviv, Ukraine).

== Biography ==
Janicki was born on 10 August 1928 in Chortkiv, Podolia and was raised in the Łyczaków district of Lviv.

In 1954, he got a job at Polish Radio. He became a pioneer of the radio soap opera, co-writing "Matysiakowie" (1956–), which was broadcast in other European countries. He was also a writer for the radio programs "W Jezioranach" and Parnasik and the television shows "Dom" and "Polskie Drogi".

Janicki was also the author of numerous books, including "Biografia w valizce" and a collection of radio plays called "Bow to the Trees" as well as film scripts, the most well-known films being "Przerwany Lot" (Interrupted Flight), "Trzech krok po ziemi" (Three Steps on Earth), and "Tragarz puchu" (The Down Carrier).

== Personal life and death ==
Janicki was married to Krystyna, Czechowicz-Janicka. His wife is a doctor and university lecturer. The couple had two daughters.

Janicki died on 15 April 2007 in Warsaw.
