= Telewizja Republika =

- Logo used from 2017
- Country: Poland
- Broadcast area: Nationwide (Poland), United States, Worldwide (via YouTube, and Digital)

Programming
- Picture format: 1080i HDTV (downscaled to 16:9 576i for the SDTV feed)

Ownership
- Owner: Telewizja Republika SA

History
- Launched: 10 April 2013; 13 years ago

Links
- Website: tvrepublika.pl

Availability

Terrestrial
- Emitel (MUX8): Channel 51
- TVT (Rybnik, Ornontowice): Channel 23 and 53
- TVL (Lubin, Głogów): Channel 54

Streaming media
- YouTube: Watch live

Telewizja Republika or TV Republika is a Polish Television station, whose editor-in-chief is Tomasz Sakiewicz. The channel can be received via satellite, via the Internet and terrestrial in the DVB-T system (Katowice and the surrounding area), as well as in the DVB-T2 system (Warsaw, Wrocław and the vicinity of these cities). From 2022, the channel broadcasts its program 24 hours a day. The live portion of its output in Polish is broadcast every day, from 5:30 a.m. to 1:40 a.m., while late nights, the programs of the English-speaking editorial staff of the channel are broadcast.

The station is seen as right-wing, inspired by the American station Fox News and supportive of the Law and Justice political party.

The channel can be received via satellite or the Internet, among others, on YouTube and terrestrial in the DVB-T2 system on selected local multiplexes.

== Ownership structure ==
The joint-stock company managing the television did not publish the exact shareholder structure. The television is 40% owned by Dariusz Szymański (a businessman living in Switzerland). The remaining shareholders with a share exceeding 5% include, according to information from the station's website, Jolanta Siwczyk, Niezależne Wydawnictwo Polskie (publisher of Gazeta Polska) and Słowa Niezależne – a company related to Srebrna and the Lech Kaczyński Institute. According to Sakiewicz, Słowa Niezależne holds less than 10% of the shares.

== History ==
=== 2012 to 2023 ===
The creation of the channel has been ongoing since 2012. The seat of the owner and the station is Warsaw. From the beginning, the station was managed by Telewizja Niezależna Spółka Akcyjna, of which Piotr Barełkowski became the president of the management board. Bronisław Wildstein and Tomasz Sakiewicz (for marketing and subscriber market) became vice-presidents of the management board, and the following members of the company's supervisory board included: Anita Gargas-Wojciechowska, Katarzyna Gójska-Hejke, Cezary Gmyz, Piotr Kwiecień, Rafał Ziemkiewicz. The company's share capital amounted to PLN 100,000, paid in quarters.

The founders of the station cited as inspiration the American station Fox News.

At the end of 2012, Bronisław Wildstein became the editor-in-chief of the station. The television project was announced as a "supra-environmental" initiative. The team of journalists included representatives of the press ("Do Rzeczy", "Gazeta Polska") and internet portals (Niezalezna.pl, Fronda.pl), who were active on television in the past: Bronisław Wildstein (editor-in-chief, former president of Telewizja Polska), Tomasz Sakiewicz, Ewa Stankiewicz (artistic director), Rafał Ziemkiewicz, Piotr Lisiewicz, Joanna Lichocka, Anita Gargas, Cezary Gmyz, Katarzyna Hejke, Piotr Gociek, Marek Magierowski, Tomasz Terlikowski, Marcin Wolski and Krzysztof Masłoń. The TV journalistic and production team consisted of approximately 50 people in total.

The station's studio was blessed on February 18, 2013 by Father Krzysztof Stępowski, Redemptorist, archdiocesan pastor of the Extraordinary Form of the Roman Rite.

The station's initial budget was expected to be approximately PLN 4–5 million. Financial results from operations in the first half of 2013 showed that losses outweighed revenues; in August 2013, the station had 58 employees. In mid-October 2013, the station's authorities started the public sale of shares with a total value of PLN 8.5 million.

From July 1, 2013, the management of the station was formally taken over by the joint-stock company Telewizja Republika (successor to Telewizja Niezależna S.A.).

At the end of 2013, it was possible to purchase shares in the station's broadcaster, Telewizja Niezależna, as part of a public share offering; and the owners intended to spend the obtained funds on investments in television.

From the beginning of the station's existence, its headquarters was located at 73 Farbiarska Street in Warsaw. At the beginning of January 2014, the studio was moved to Dzielna 58 Street in Warsaw.

On March 31, 2014, Piotr Barełkowski resigned from the position of president of the station's management board. On April 7, 2014, Radosław Dobrzyński took over as the station's general director.

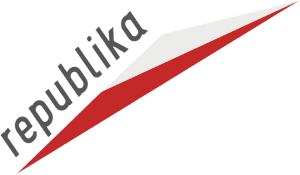
TV Republika's logo from 2013 to 2017

On September 18, 2014, Tomasz Terlikowski became the new editor-in-chief of the station, and Anita Gargas became his deputy. Bronisław Wildstein, who had previously held this position, resigned from both positions and from hosting his program.

In 2016–2017, many journalists and publicists left the station and started cooperation with Telewizja Polska and Polskie Radio.

On May 8, 2017, Tomasz Terlikowski stopped managing the channel, remaining on its management board as program director. On that day, Dorota Kania took over as editor-in-chief. Her successor was Tomasz Sakiewicz, who a month later also became the president of Telewizja Republika SA.

On August 30, 2020, the station's headquarters was flooded by a downpour.

=== Since December 2023 ===
The station has been very supportive of the Law and Justice political party, and receiving financial support from the Polish government during the years that party was in power.

In December 2023, Telewizja Republika was critical of the changes initiated in public media in Poland. The channel reported events from the headquarters of Telewizja Polska, Polskie Radio, the Television Information Agency and the Polish Press Agency, showing, among others, change of authorities in the seats, actions resulting from the intervention of parliamentarians selected from the lists of Law and Justice and from meetings whose participants opposed changes made in the public media.

The broadcast of the events meant that on December 25–26, 2023, according to Nielsen Media, Telewizja Republika was watched by over 400,000 viewers in the evenings, which made it the most watched news television in Poland. In the first week of changes in public media, from December 20 to 26 of the same year, the channel achieved 2.68% market share, thus being the second most watched news station in Poland after TVN24, which had less than 7% daily share in the same period of the year.

After the changes at TVP, several former TVP Info employees began to host programs on the station, including Michał Rachoń (previously journalist of Telewizja Republika in 2013–2016), host of the program Jedziemy, who became the new director of programming of the channel on December 28, 2023.

On December 29, 2023, Danuta Holecka became one of the hosts of Dzisiaj and Gość Dzisiaj. Her live debut was watched on TV by over 556,000 viewers, and another 20 thousand watched the broadcast on YouTube. During the program, the channel's website crashed for several minutes due to server overload. Within 24 hours after the broadcast, the edition was viewed by over 250,000 unique users. The program Gość Dzisiaj, whose guest was Mateusz Morawiecki, was watched by 760,000 people. viewers, and the conversation with Mariusz Błaszczak over 800,000. people.

On January 9, 2024, Miłosz Kłeczek, who worked at Telewizja Polska in 2016–2023, became the presenter of current affairs programs and a reporter of the station. On that day, according to Nielsen Media data, the channel's audience was over 300,000 people, and in the evening (from 7:00 p.m. to 11:00 p.m.) over 815,000 people. At its peak, Telewizja Republika was followed by over a million viewers. That evening, at 7:30 p.m., an interview with Jarosław Kaczyński, president of Law and Justice, was broadcast. The coverage of the arrest of Maciej Wąsik and Mariusz Kamiński was the most watched live broadcast on the YouTube account in the station's history. At the moment of peak interest, the broadcast was watched by nearly 73,000 Internet users.

On January 10, 2024, Adrian Borecki, who worked at Wiadomości from 2016 to 2023, became the reporter of the main news program Dzisiaj. On the same day, Edyta Hołdyńska, a former consular officer in Washington, also became a reporter of the news service.

On January 11, 2024, Telewizja Republika was the only station in Poland to broadcast live the entire March of Free Poles (Marszu wolnych Polaków). The demonstration held in Warsaw was an expression of opposition to some of the actions of Tusk's government, including those regarding changes at Telewizja Polska. The protesters also demanded the release of Law and Justice politicians, Mariusz Kamiński and Maciej Wąsik. On that day, according to Nielsen Media data, the channel gained 6.06% share in the television market, and the station was watched by over 3 million viewers (the main edition of Dzisiaj alone gathered over 911,000 viewers). On the same day, the intro and graphics of the main news service Dzisiaj, broadcast on the station, were changed.

From January 12 to 23, 2024, the channel reported, including live, protests taking place every evening in front of prisons in Radom and Przytuły Stare, where Mariusz Kamiński and Maciej Wąsik, Law and Justice politicians, were incarcerated. The people demonstrating there demanded their immediate release. Thanks to the pardon granted by President Andrzej Duda, they were released on January 23 this year. They were repeatedly referred to as "political prisoners" on the station.

In January 2024, the channel released a new self-promotional spot titled House of Free Speech (Dom Wolnego Słowa), where the station's main journalists appeared, including: Danuta Holecka, Michał Rachoń, Aleksander Wierzejski, and Miłosz Kłeczek. The material is broadcast on Telewizja Republika and is available on the Internet, among others, on YouTube.

From February 1, 2024, Rafał Patyra, who worked at Telewizja Polska (2003-2023), TV Puls and TVN in past, hosts a daily news program Express Republiki, which is a competitor to Teleexpress.

On March 18, 2024, channel launched new programmes: Po 9:00 hosted by Adrian Klarenbach and Express Plus, an information program that supplements the main issue of Express Republiki.

On June 21, 2024, the National Broadcasting Council (KRRiT) granted the station a license to broadcast on the eighth multiplex of digital terrestrial television. On June 28, 2024, a test broadcast began on it, which was completed on the day of the official launch on July 12, 2024. On April 9, 2025, the Voivodeship Administrative Court in Warsaw ruled to reverse the decision (not in force - KRRiT's chairman announced appeal).

In December 2024, TV Republika moved to a new headquarter with up-to-date production equipment.

== Controversies ==
In 2015, the National Broadcasting Council, in its report on the method of covering the 2015 election campaign, identified the most biased materials broadcast by the Dzisiaj news service. The analysis of information materials was performed by the Media Research Laboratory of the University of Warsaw.

=== From December 2023 ===
==== Jan Pietrzak's remark (2023) ====
Jan Pietrzak said on December 31, 2023:

"I have a cruel joke with these immigrants that they count on Poles being prepared because we have barracks. We have barracks for immigrants: in Auschwitz, Majdanek, Treblinka, Stutthof. We have a lot of barracks built here by the Germans. And that's where we will keep these immigrants, illegally pushed to us by the Germans, because people who escape to a better world are not illegal. The authorities that let them in are illegal, i.e. the Germans are illegal. Their slogan welcoming the newcomers was illegal, outside the treaty, and inconsistent with any laws. This is illegal German activity. We should be sensitive to this in the coming year, because it seems that it is starting to bother us a lot."

The Minister of Justice and Attorney General Adam Bodnar asked the prosecutor's office to address the statement. A spokesman for the District Prosecutor's Office in Warsaw said that proceedings in this case were initiated on January 2, 2024. They also sent their complaint to the National Broadcasting Council, among others: Krzysztof Luft (in 2010–2016 a member of the National Broadcasting Council) and Tadeusz Kowalski (current member of the National Broadcasting Council), in which they also demand punishment of Telewizja Republika, on which these words were said.

The lack of a firm reaction condemning Jan Pietrzak's statement by Katarzyna Gójska, who was interviewing him, and the station's opening line defending Pietrzak, emphasizing that during World War II his father was murdered in one of the German concentration camps, were highly criticized.
