= The Matysiaks =

Polish radio drama

The Matysiaks (Polish: Matysiakowie), also known as The Matysiak Family, is a Polish radio drama. The series follows the fictional Matysiak family from Powiśle, Warsaw. It premiered in December 1956 and has been broadcast weekly on Polskie Radio Program 1, making it one of the longest-running radio dramas in the world. Each episode lasts approximately 25 minutes. 3,612 episodes have aired as of July 11, 2026.

== History ==
The series was created and principally written by Jerzy Janicki. Other scriptwriters included Stanisław Stampf’l, Władysław Żesławski, and Dżennet Półtorzycka. More than 250 actors have appeared in the series, including Jerzy Bończak, Tadeusz Fijewski, Mieczysława Ćwiklińska, Edmund Fetting, Stanisława Perzanowska, Krzysztof Chamiec, Mieczysław Czechowicz, Hanka Bielicka, Maciej Damięcki, and Jan Englert. In recent years, episodes have also been distributed as podcasts by Polskie Radio.

Created in December 1956, shortly after the events of the Polish October, the series opened with an episode in which the family members donate to a charity for Hungarians after the suppressed Hungarian Revolution of 1956.

During its early years, Polskie Radio did not officially announce the show, leading some listeners to believe it was a reality show rather than a scripted drama. A study by the Centre for Public Opinion Research in 1968 identified it as the most popular radio drama in Poland, with an estimated audience of 12 million.

The program faced censorship under the People’s Republic of Poland; for example, references to church marriages were prohibited in the 1970s. It was also suspended for six months during the period of martial law in 1981. No character was depicted as a member of the Polish United Workers' Party. Despite these restrictions, the series has generally focused on everyday issues such as living on low wages and pensions, children’s education, and local events in Warsaw, with occasional storylines addressing broader social or political topics, including lustration.

The series distinguishes itself from the conventions of soap operas by focusing on social issues rather than major dramatic events or romantic storylines. Characters age within the series, with younger generations replacing older ones over time. The Matysiak family is portrayed as having participated in key historical events, including the Siege of Warsaw (1939), the Warsaw Uprising, and the Battle of Monte Cassino. Listener engagement with the series has also led to organized charitable and commemorative initiatives, including the establishment of a nursing home in the 1960s and the erection of monuments to Bolesław Prus (1970s) and Ignacy Jan Paderewski (1980s). More recently, the program has been associated with support for animal rights initiatives.
