= Gazeta Polska Codziennie =

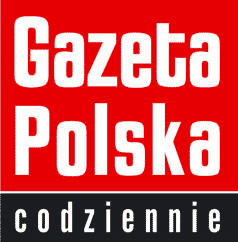
- Type: Daily newspaper
- Format: tabloid
- Publisher: Forum S.A.
- Editor-in-chief: Tomasz Sakiewicz
- Founded: 2011; 14 years ago
- Language: Polish
- Headquarters: Warsaw, Poland
- Circulation: 18,747 (October 2016)
- ISSN: 2083-7119
- Website: gpcodziennie.pl

Gazeta Polska Codziennie (Polish: [ˈd͡ʑɛn.ɲik ˈpɔl.ska t͡sɔˈd͡ʑɛn.ɲɛ], Gazeta Polska Daily) is a Polish right-wing daily newspaper issued since September 9, 2011.

During its announcement, its editor-in-chief, Tomasz Sakiewicz, said that its editorial staff was planned to be about 60 persons, including half of the staff of Gazeta Polska weekly, with the majority being new people.
