= Polskie Radio Program I =

Polish national radio station

Polskie Radio Program I (PR1)
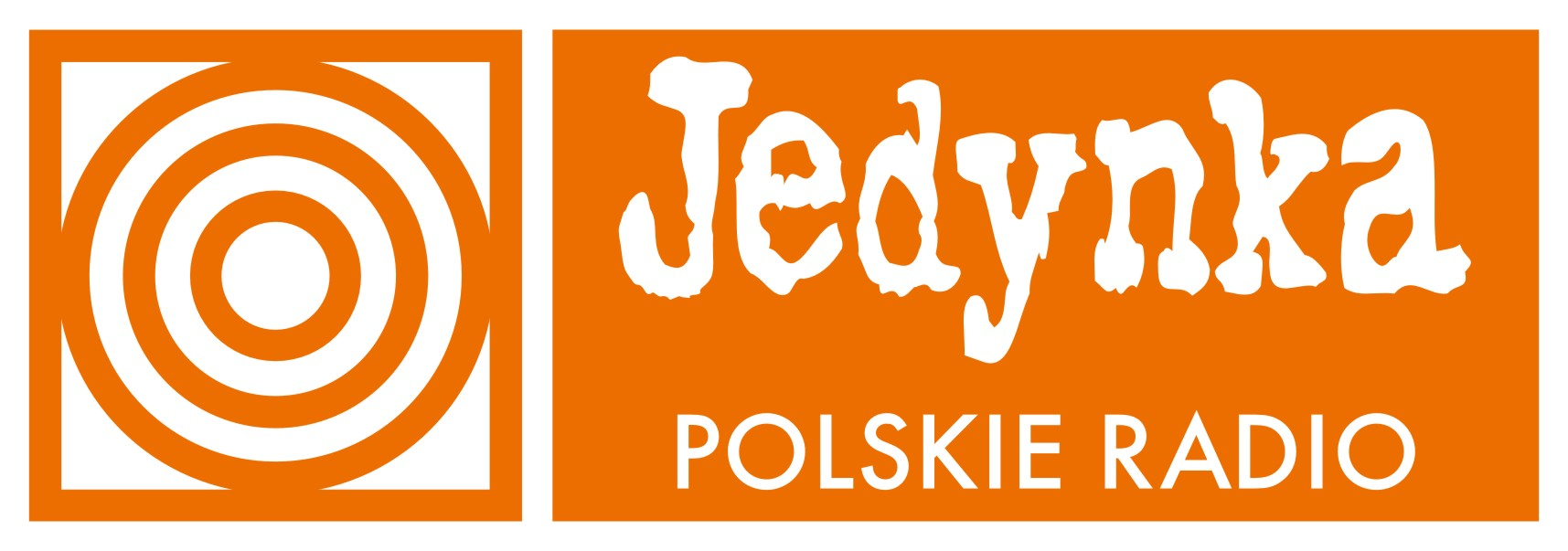
- Warsaw; Poland
- Broadcast area: Poland: Nationally on analogue FM and longwave, digital DAB+ & via online streaming Internationally; United States: DirecTV; Canada: Bell Satellite TV and Germany, Slovakia, Czech Republic, Denmark, Sweden, Lithuania, Kaliningrad, Belarus, Ukraine
- Frequencies: LW: 225 kHz; FM: 92.4 MHz (Warsaw), various in the whole country DAB+: Block 6B (Warsaw), various blocks DirecTV (USA): 2174; Bell Satellite TV (Canada): 987
- Branding: Jedynka (One)

Programming
- Language: Polish
- Format: News, current affairs, talk, culture, science, music, entertainment, easy listening, soft AC

Ownership
- Owner: Polskie Radio
- Sister stations: Dwójka; Trójka; Czwórka

History
- First air date: 18 April 1926; 100 years ago

Links
- Webcast: Live Stream
- Website: jedynka.polskieradio.pl

Polskie Radio Program I, known also as PR1 or radiowa Jedynka is a radio channel broadcast by the Polish public broadcaster, Polskie Radio. It is dedicated to information and easy listening music. Some of its broadcasts have decades-old traditions and are quite famous, such as Matysiakowie and W Jezioranach.

== History ==
Program I began test transmissions on 1 February 1925, and began regular transmissions on 18 April 1926 (as Polskie Radio Warszawa), one year after its parent company, Polskie Radio was founded.

In 1924 the Post, Telegraph, and Telephone Act was passed, and in February of the following year, a broadcasting station built already in Poland started operation. Several months later (18 August), a privately owned company Polish Radio received a license for broadcasting a radio program. In 1935, the Polish government bought 96% of its shares and so the radio became the property of the state.

== Overview ==
Jedynka broadcasts a program of universal character, addressed to a wide range of listeners, distinguished by a large amount of information, which is prepared, among other things, by the News Editorial Board. The program is broadcast on long waves in the amplitude modulation system on a frequency of 225 kHz from the Radio Broadcasting Center in Solec Kujawski and on VHF waves from transmitters throughout Poland, digitally, as well as via the Internet, HbbTV and satellite in the digital system without encryption (FTA broadcast). The radio station can be listened to using a telephone link - number +48 (22) 645 91 00.

Jedynka's total reception range in the VHF band (as of July 2012) covered 92.33% of the country's population and 90.19% of Poland's area. It is complemented by long-wave broadcasting which often can be received in foreign countries.

== See also ==
- Eastern Bloc information dissemination
