= Tomasz Sakiewicz =

Polish journalist

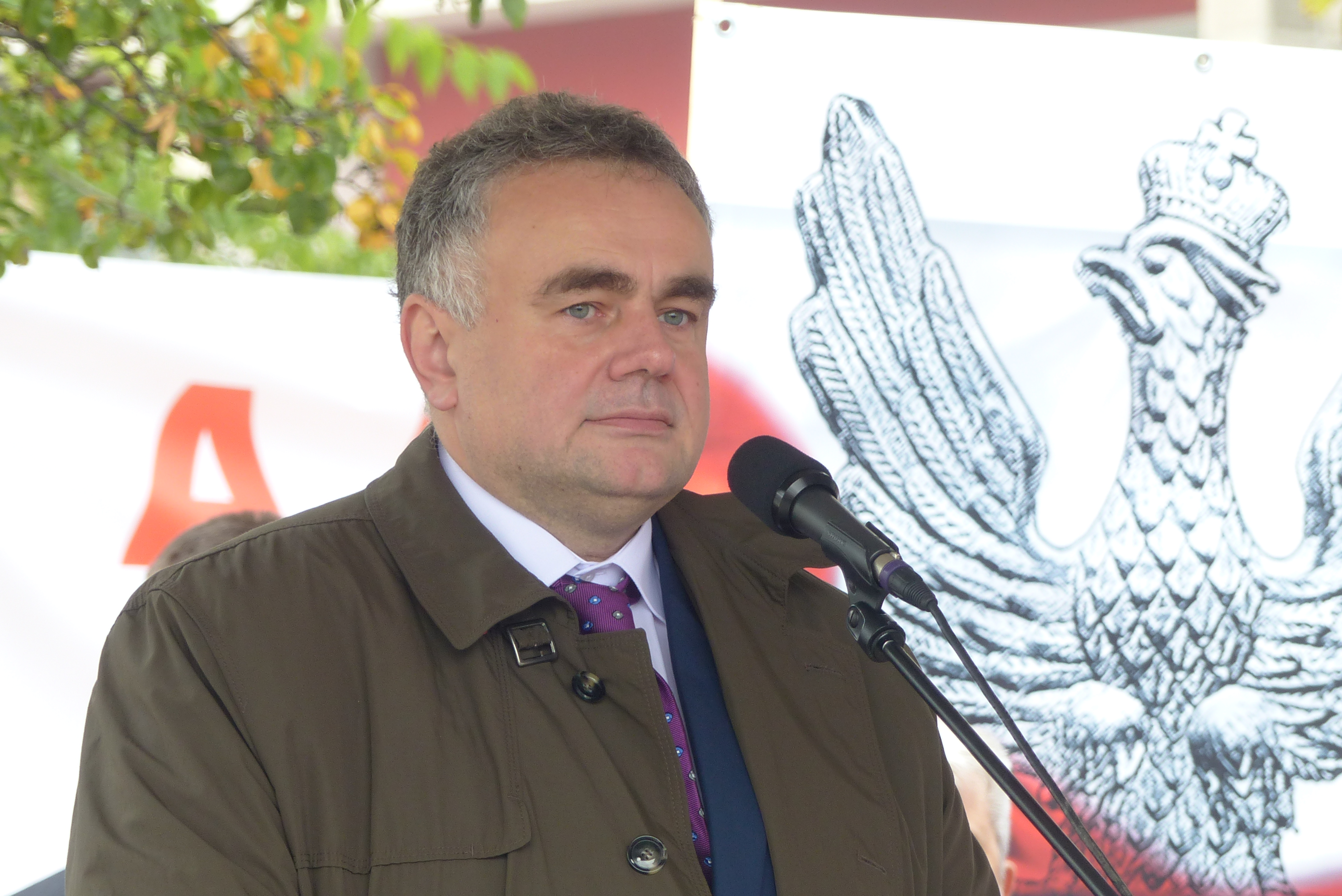
Tomasz Sakiewicz

Tomasz Józef Sakiewicz (born 31 December 1967, in Warsaw) is a Polish right-wing activist, journalist, publicist, and the editor-in-chief of Gazeta Polska.
