= Gazeta Polska =

Polish weekly newspaper (1993–)

- Chief editor: Tomasz Sakiewicz
- Political alignment: right-wing populist to far-right, conservative
- Categories: Political magazine
- Frequency: Weekly
- Circulation: 96,246 (October 2016)
- Founded: 1993; 33 years ago
- Company: Niezależne Wydawnictwo Polskie Sp z o.o.
- Based in: Warsaw
- Language: Polish
- Website: Official website
- ISSN: 1230-4581

Gazeta Polska (lit.: Polish Newspaper) is a Polish language pro-United Right right-wing populist to far-right weekly magazine published in Poland.

== Profile and history ==
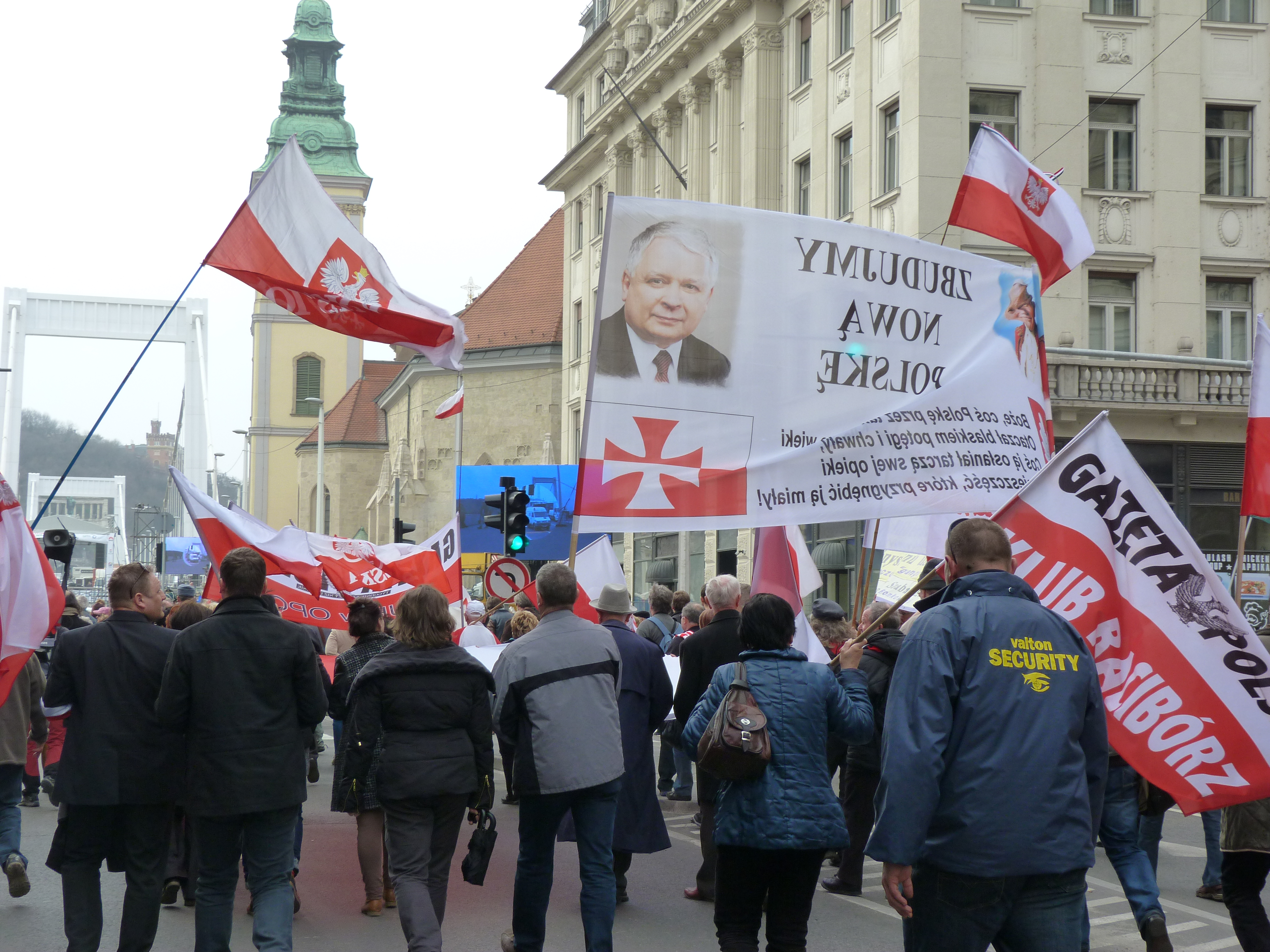
Support demonstration in Budapest, 15 March 2014

Gazeta Polska was founded in 1993 and its editor-in-chief is Tomasz Sakiewicz. Its contributors include: Piotr Lisiewicz, Jacek Kwieciński, Eliza Michalik, Robert Tekieli, Krystyna Grzybowska, Maciej Rybiński, Jacek Łęski, Piotr Semka, Jerzy Targalski, Marcin Wolski, Tadeusz Isakowicz-Zaleski (2011–2014) and Rafał A. Ziemkiewicz.

The print and e-edition circulation of Gazeta Polska was 40,660 in August 2014.

The description of its political orientation ranges from conservative to right-wing, extreme right-wing and nationalist on the far-right. Gazeta Polska is said to offer "a good representation of the sympathies of PiS supporters".

Gazeta Polska maintains a number of clubs (Kluby Gazety Polskiej), which are located not only in Poland, but also abroad, in places where Polonia is present (Chicago, New York, London, Dublin, Paris, Leeds, Vancouver, Frankfurt, Berlin, Sydney). The clubs organise meetings with writers, politicians and public figures, rallies and demonstrations. On 15 March 2012 Gazeta Polska organized "The Great Trip to Hungary" (Wielki wyjazd na Węgry). A reserved train left Warsaw Central Station, stopping on the way to Hungary at Radom, Kielce, Kraków, Tarnów and Nowy Sącz. Altogether, 3,000 people went to Budapest, to demonstrate in support of Viktor Orbán.

On 1 March 2019, French minister of Higher Education Frédérique Vidal complained to the Polish government for the fact that the New Polish School of Holocaust Scholarship seminar held at the School for Advanced Studies in the Social Sciences, in Paris, has been roughly disrupted "on a very organized manner" by Polish activists for the "Gazeta Polska" weekly. Vidal further stated that Polish state representatives (Institute of National Remembrance) supported the disruption.

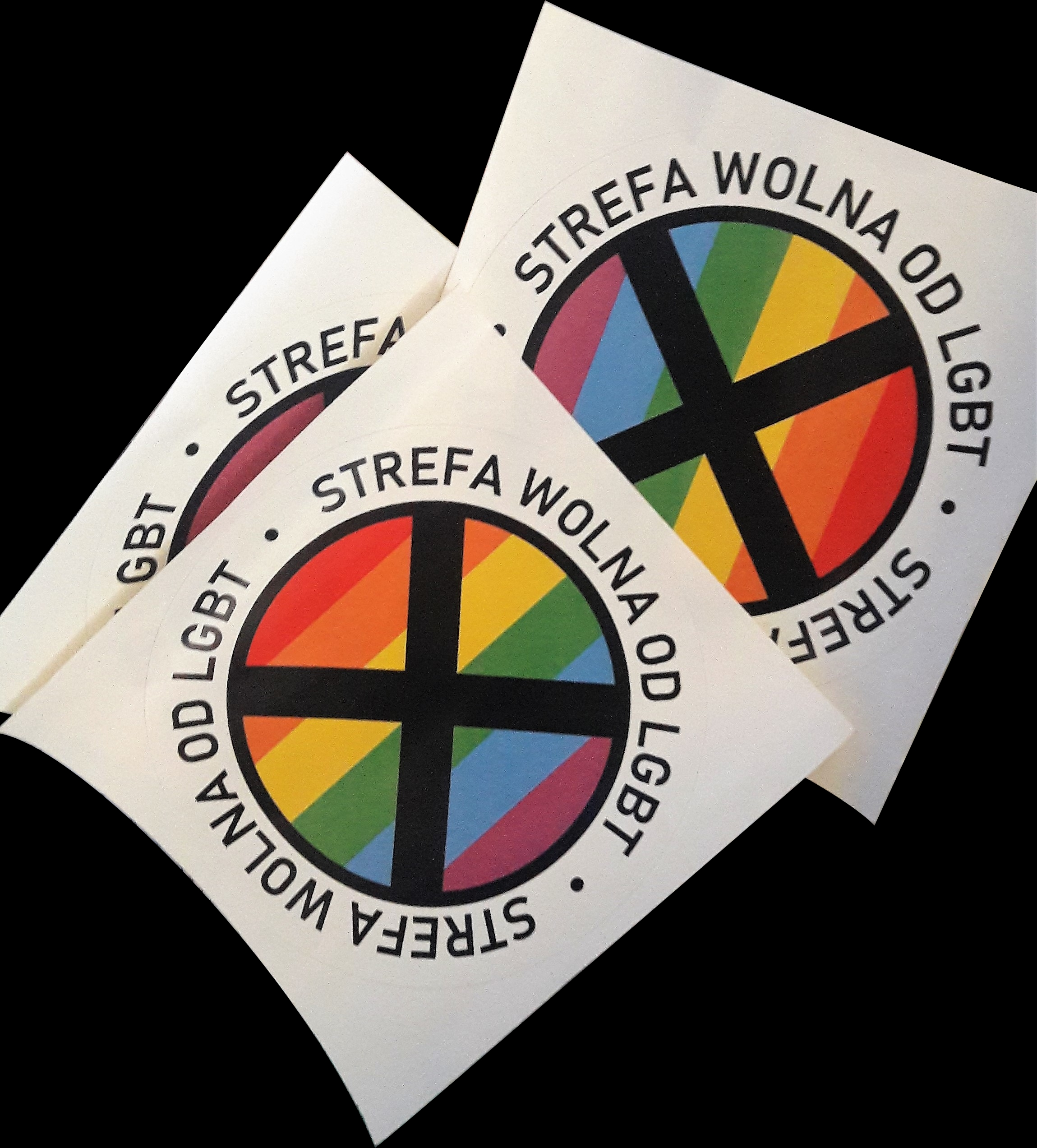
LGBT-free zone stickers distributed by Gazeta Polska

In 2019, Gazeta Polska announced plans to distribute stickers proclaiming an "LGBT-free zone" to its readers. Gazeta Polska said it would include the stickers, which feature an image of a black cross over a Pride flag alongside the slogan. On 25 July, a District Court in Warsaw ordered the Gazeta Polska weekly to withdraw the anti-LGBT stickers from circulation. However, the editor of the magazine dismissed the ruling saying it was "fake news" and censorship, and that the paper would continue distributing the sticker. Gazeta Polska continued distribution of the stickers, but modified the decal to read "LGBT Ideology-Free Zone".

In July 2020, Empik, Poland's largest media chain, refused to stock Gazeta Polska after it issued the stickers. In August 2019, a show organized by the Gazeta Polska Community of America scheduled for 24 October in Carnegie Hall in New York was cancelled after complaints of anti-LGBT ties led to artists pulling out of the show.

== See also ==
- List of magazines in Poland
