= Start International Polska =

Polish dubbing studio

- Industry: Dubbing and subtitling
- Founded: 1995
- Headquarters: Warsaw, Poland
- Website: Start International Polska

Start International Polska is a Polish dubbing and voice-over translation studio based in Warsaw.

The studio was founded in 1995. The company commissions voice-over translations of content for DVD distributors and TV channels. Start International Polska is also one of the dubbing studios that Nickelodeon (Poland) works with, the other being Master Film.

== Clients ==
- Cartoon Network Poland
- Canal+ Poland
- Nickelodeon (Poland)
- Ale Kino!
- Cinema City Poland
- Cyfrowy Polsat
- Disney Character Voices International
- Disney Channel Poland
- Forum Film Poland
- Monolith Films
- Nelvana
- SPI International Polska
- Kuchnia.tv
- Planète Poland
- Universal Studios
- United International Pictures
- Warner Bros.
- Telewizja Polska
- TVN (Poland)
- DreamWorks
- ZigZap
- MiniMini
- and more

== Staff ==
=== Directors ===
- Bartosz Wierzbięta
- Agata Gawrońska-Bauman
- Andrzej Chudy
- Marek Klimczuk
- Artur Kaczmarski
- Elżbieta Kopocińska
- Marek Robaczewski
- Wojciech Paszkowski
- Paweł Galia
- Anna Apostolakis

=== Sound and assembly ===
- Hanna Makowska
- Janusz Tokarzewski
- Michał Skarżyński
- Jerzy Wierciński
- Sławomir Czwórnóg
- Paweł Tymosiak
- Piotr Kamiński

== Content ==
=== Cartoons ===
- Angelina Ballerina: The Next Steps
- South Park
- Pingu
- Hey Arnold! (old and new dubs)
- 101 Dalmatians: The Series
- Angel's Friends
- Anthony Ant
- The Wild Thornberrys
- Camp Lazlo
- Sitting Ducks
- Droopy, Master Detective
- Kampung Boy
- Codename: Kids Next Door
- Martin Mystery
- Dora the Explorer
- Dastardly and Muttley in Their Flying Machines (new dub)
- The Cramp Twins (season 1 and 2)
- Charlie and Lola (episodes 1–16)
- The Angry Beavers
- Dex Hamilton: Alien Entomologist
- Go, Diego, Go!
- It's a Big Big World
- Generation O!
- Wide-Eye
- 2 Stupid Dogs
- Fantômette
- Fimbles
- Winx Club (seasons 3–7, specials)
- George Shrinks
- Dumb and Dumber
- Globtrotter Grover
- The Magilla Gorilla Show (new dub)
- Fat Dog Mendoza
- Jacob Two-Two
- Johnny Bravo
- Hong Kong Phooey
- Egyxos

=== Live action series ===
- Goosebumps (Episodes 47–66)
- iCarly
- Big Time Rush
- True Jackson, VP
- Bear in the Big Blue House

== Voice artists ==
- Brygida Turowska
- Modest Ruciński
- Wit Apostolakis-Gluziński
- Monika Pikuła
- Dominika Kluźniak
- Jaroslaw Boberek
- Justyna Bojczuk
- Maksymilian Michasiów
- Aleksandra Traczyńska
- Krzysztof Szczerbiński
- Marcin Hycnar
- Tomasz Bednarek
- Janusz Wituch
- Agnieszka Matysiak
- Wojciech Paszkowski
- Anna Sztejner
- Olga Zaręba
- Agnieszka Kunikowska
- Mirosława Krajewska
- Robert Tondera
- Joanna Pach
- Ewa Serwa
- Grzegorz Drojewski
- Adrian Perdjon
- Wojciech Machnicki
- Krzysztof Bednarek
- Piotr Makarski
- Artur Kaczmarski
- Radosław Popłonikowski
- Włodzimierz Bednarski
- Klaudiusz Kaufmann
- Tomasz Steciuk
- Damian Kulec
- Jacek Mikołajczak
- Zdzisław Wardejn
- Krzysztof Cybiński
- Jonasz Tołopiło
- Jacek Kopczyński
- Marcin Kudełka
- Robert Więckiewicz
- Arkadiusz Bazak
- Leszek Zduń
- Piotr Janusz
- Cezary Kwieciński
- Jacek Bończyk
- Barbara Zielińska
- Paweł Ciołkosz
- Andrzej Chudy
- Anna Sroka
- Miłogost Reczek
- Joanna Jeżewska
- Izabela Dąbrowska
- Paweł Szczesny
- Włodzimierz Press
- Grzegorz Kwiecień
- Marek Bocianiak
- Barbara Kałużna
- Małgorzata Puzio
- Elżbieta Gaertner
- Jan Kulczycki
- Jacek Wolszczak
- Franek Boberek
- Łukasz Lewandowski
- Arkadiusz Jakubik
- Jakub Truszczyński
- Adam Pluciński
- Mirosław Zbrojewicz
- Tomasz Marzecki
- Janusz Bukowski
- Jolanta Zykun
- Zuzanna Galia
- Izabella Dziarska
- Jolanta Mrotek
- Jolanta Wilk
- Joanna Jędryka
- Hanna Kinder-Kiss
- Józef Mika
- Krzysztof Strużycki
- Krzysztof Królak
- Ewa Telega
- Tomasz Kot
- Joanna Jabłczyńska
- Mirosława Dubrawska
- Barbara Melzer
- Monika Błachnio
- Wojciech Duryasz
- Joanna Orzeszkowska
- Natalia Jankiewicz
- Kajetan Lewandowski
- Cezary Nowak
- Mirosław Wieprzewski
- Joanna Szczepkowska
- Julia Kołakowska
- Agata Kulesza
- Aleksandra Koncewicz
- Elżbieta Kopocińska
- Magdalena Walach
- Małgorzata Foremniak
- Edyta Jungowska
- Lucyna Malec
- Stanisław Brejdygant
- Marta Czarkowska
- Iwona Rulewicz
- Andrzej Gawroński
- Dominika Sell
- Mikołaj Klimek
- Marta Zgutczyńska
- Przemysław Stippa
- Jacek Rozenek
- Jakub Molęda
- Piotr Bajtlik
- Katarzyna Kozak
- Rafał Kołsut
- Joanna Kudelska
- Julia Hertmanowska
- Beata Jankowska-Tzimas
- Marek Robaczewski
- Małgorzata Kożuchowska
- Dorota Lanton
- Elżbieta Jędrzejewska
- Magdalena Różczka
- Tomasz Jarosz
- Maciej Miecznikowski
- Artur Żmijewski
- Jacek Lenartowicz
- Angelika Kurowska
- Cezary Pazura
- Błażej Wójcik
- Marcin Dorociński
- Marcin Perchuć
- Anna Ułas
- Przemysław Sadowski
- Hanna Śleszyńska
- Hania Stach
- Daniel Olbrychski
- Piotr Warszawski
- Sonia Bohosiewicz
- Małgorzata Sadowska
- Andrzej Grabowski
- Piotr Bąk
- Marek Obertyn
- Przemysław Nikiel
- Łukasz Nowicki
- Jarosław Domin
- Paweł Iwanicki
- Mirosław Baka
- Artur Dziurman
- Tomasz Borkowski
- Aleksander Wysocki
- Dariusz Kowalski
- Katarzyna Skolimowska
- Klementyna Umer
- Bartosz Obuchowicz
- Włodzimierz Szaranowicz
- Maria Pakulnis
- Cezary Morawski
- Łukasz Zagrobelny
- Jan Janga-Tomaszewski

== See also ==
- Studio Sonica
- Master Film
