= Studio Sonica =

Polish dubbing studio

- Industry: Dubbing
- Founded: 1993
- Headquarters: Warsaw, Poland
- Website: sonica.com.pl

Studio Sonica is a Polish dubbing studio that was founded in 1993. The studio not only commissions dubbed versions of content for its clients, but also lectured versions.

== Clients ==
- Warner Bros.
- 20th Century Fox
- DreamWorks
- Canal+ Poland
- ITI Cinema
- Disney Character Voices International
- Minimax (now known as ZigZap)
- BBC Worldwide
- MiniMini

== Content ==
- Fantastic Four (2005 film)
- Asterix and Obelix vs Caesar
- Astro Boy
- A Bug's Life
- E.T. the Extra-Terrestrial
- Good Boy!
- The Polar Express
- Ice Age
- Ice Age: The Meltdown
- Ice Age: Dawn of the Dinosaurs
- Eragon
- Garfield: The Movie
- Star Wars: The Clone Wars
- Star Wars: Episode III – Revenge of the Sith
- Cheaper by the Dozen
- Horton Hears a Who!
- Harry Potter and the Philosopher's Stone
- Harry Potter and the Chamber of Secrets
- Meet Dave
- Braceface
- 6teen
- Atomic Betty
- The Spooktacular New Adventures of Casper
- Battle B-Daman
- The Jetsons
- Duel Masters
- Cubix
- Ed, Edd n Eddy
- Huntik: Secrets & Seekers
- Super Hero Squad Show
- The Large Family
- Titeuf
- Supa Strikas
- Ruby Gloom
- The Green Squad
- Lou!
- Alvin and the Chipmunks
- Alvin and the Chipmunks: The Squeakquel
- Alvin and the Chipmunks: Chipwrecked
- Winx Club (Seasons 4 and 8)
- Monsters and Pirates (TV edition)
- The Iron Giant
- Rockin' with Judy Jetson
- ¡Mucha Lucha!
- NASCAR 3D: The Imax Experience
- Raa Raa the Noisy Lion
- Ice Age: A Mammoth Christmas
- Total Drama
- Hey Duggee
- Eliot Kid
- Penguins of Madagascar
- The Bob's Burgers Movie
- Aquaman
- Justice League
- Zack Snyder's Justice League
- The Batman
- Black Adam
- Blue Beetle
- Shazam!
- Wonder Woman
- Gus the Itsy Bitsy Knight
- DC Super Hero Girls
- Skunk Fu!
- Chop Socky Chooks
- The Simpsons Movie
- Peter Pan & Wendy

== Staff ==
=== Managers ===
- Roman Szafrański
- Olga Szlachcic

=== Directors ===
- Miriam Aleksandrowicz
- Jerzy Dominik
- Magdalena Gnatowska
- Piotr Kozłowski
- Andrzej Mastalerz
- Jacek Kopczyński
- Jacek Rozenek
- Piotr Zelt
- Jarosław Boberek

== Voice actors ==
- Janusz Wituch
- Jerzy Dominik
- Miriam Aleksandrowicz
- Anna Apostolakis
- Tomasz Bednarek
- Grzegorz Hardej
- Grzegorz Drojewski
- Jarosław Boberek
- Jarosław Domin
- Jonasz Tołopiło
- Mirosława Niemczyk
- Anna Sztejner
- Jan Radzikowski
- Elżbieta Jędrzejewska
- Karina Szafrańska
- Witold Wysota
- Dariusz Kurzelewski
- Anna Ułas
- Aleksander Czyż
- Modest Ruciński
- Agata Buzek
- Katarzyna Godlewska
- Maciej Zakościelny
- Anna Sroka
- Jacek Bończyk
- Marcin Przybylski
- Brygida Turowska
- Agnieszka Kunikowska
- Łukasz Talik
- Beata Deskur
- Jan Aleksandrowicz
- Michał Głowacki
- Agnieszka Kudelska
- Joanna Górniak
- Dorota Furtak
- Waldemar Barwiński
- Katarzyna Łaska
- Michał Maciejewski
- Miłogost Reczek
- Joanna Pach
- Robert Kudelski
- Hanna Kinder-Kiss
- Klementyna Umer
- Piotr Kozłowski
- Katarzyna Pysiak
- Monika Węgiel
- Monika Ambroziak
- Beata Deskur
- Paweł Ciołkosz
- Marta Zygadło
- Magdalena Stużyńska
- Karolina Dryzner
- Mieczysław Morański
- Jerzy Mazur
- Jacek Czyż
- Agata Gawrońska-Bauman
- Adam Bauman
- Paweł Szczesny
- Sławomir Pacek
- Arkadiusz Jakubik
- Olga Bończyk
- Beata Wyrąbkiewicz
- Aleksandra Rojewska
- Elżbieta Kopocińska
- Krystyna Kozanecka
- Joanna Jabłczyńska
- Adam Pluciński
- Jakub Truszczyński
- Wit Apostolakis-Gluziński
- Mateusz Narloch
- Monika Pikuła
- Robert Tondera
- Krzysztof Szczerbiński
- Marcin Łabno
- Ewa Dałkowska
- Wiesława Mazurkiewicz
- Maria Peszek
- Magdalena Karel
- Lucyna Malec
- Julia Kołakowska
- Magdalena Różczka
- Joanna Jędryka
- Julia Malska
- Edyta Jungowska
- Agnieszka Fajlhauer
- Katarzyna Owczarz
- Kamilla Baar
- Wojciech Duryasz
- Aleksander Gręziak
- Włodzimierz Bednarski
- Przemysław Stippa
- Leszek Zduń
- Krzysztof Gosztyła
- Marian Opania
- Jan Prochyra
- Kajetan Lewandowski
- Kacper Kuszewski
- Damian Walczak
- Sergiusz Żymełka
- Mateusz Maksiak
- Andrzej Chudy
- Artur Pontek
- Iwo Fajlhauer
- Tomasz Steciuk
- Jan Aleksandrowicz-Krasko
- Andrzej Andrzejewski
- Krzysztof Banaszyk
- Waldemar Barwiński
- Jakub Wieczorek
- Jolanta Wołłejko
- Matylda Damięcka
- Katarzyna Tatarak
- Sebastian Cybulski
- Stefan Knothe
- Łukasz Nowicki
- Aleksander Wysocki
- Jerzy Łapiński
- Olga Sawicka
- Karina Szafrańska
- Magdalena Krylik-Gruziel
- Dominika Kluźniak
- Joanna Wizmur
- Agnieszka Matysiak
- Julia Kornacka
- Justyna Bojczuk
- Izabella Bukowska
- Wojciech Malajkat
- Marcin Perchuć
- Cezary Pazura
- Piotr Fronczewski
- Dariusz Toczek
- Ryszard Olesiński
- Andrzej Zieliński
- Tomasz Kot
- Jacek Sołtysiak
- Janusz Zadura
- Antoni Pawlicki
- Maciej Falana
- Michał Piela
- Mariusz Kiljan
- Borys Szyc

== See also ==
- SDI Media Group (fellow dubbing company which also has an office in Warsaw, Poland)
- Start International Polska
- Master Film (Poland)
