= Marcin Mortka =

Fantasy author

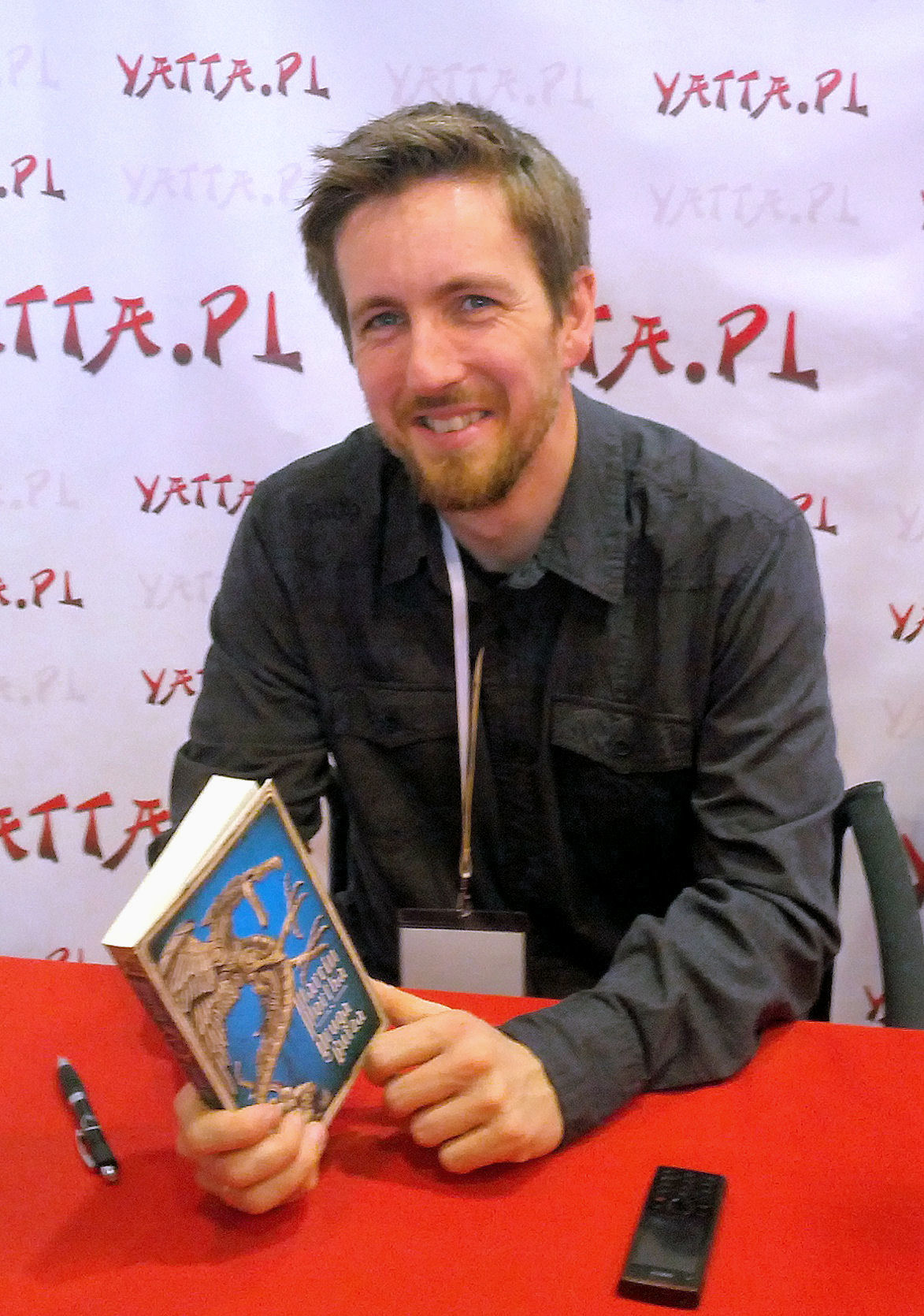
- Mortka in 2014.
- Born: 5 April 1976 (age 50); Poznań, Poland
- Occupations: Novelist, translator, language teacher
- Writing career
- Period: 1996–present
- Genres: fantasy, historical fiction, children's literature, young adult fiction

Marcin Mortka (Polish: [ˈmar.t͡ɕin ˈmɔrt.ka]; born 5 April 1976) is a Polish fantasy, historical fiction, children's literature, and young adult fiction author, writing in Polish language. He is also a translator of English, and a teacher of English and Norwegian.

== Biography ==
Marcin Mortka was born on 5 April 1976 in Poznań, Poland. He is an alumnus of the Faculty of Modern Languages and Literatures at the Adam Mickiewicz University in Poznań, where he studied the Scandinavian studies. While studying, he began writing articles for the role-playing game magazines. From 1996 to 2000, he wrote for Magia i Miecz, and from 2000 to 2003, for Portal.

From 2002 to 2015, he translated books from English to Polish. The first book he had translated was HMS Surprise by Patrick O'Brian.

His first book, wrote in the fantasy genre and titled Ostatnia saga, was published in 2003 by Runa publishing house. The book had been followed up with Wojna runów in 2004, and Świt po bitwie in 2007. In 2005 and 2006, he published a fantasy duology series Karaibska krucjata. They were the last books published by him in Runa, with his next works being since then published by Fabryka Słów. His next works were duology series Ragnarok 1940 published in 2007 and 2008, historical fantasy trilogy Miecz i kwiaty, published between 2008 and 2010, and Przygody Madsa Voortena, with books Martwe Jezioro in 2011, and Druga Burza in 2012.

In 2012, Morkta had published his first children's book, titled Przygody Tappiego z Szepczącego Lasu, with Zielona Sowa publishing house. The book was well-received and begun a series of books titled Opowieści o wikingu Tappim, and a spin-off series, Tappi i przyjaciele, both featuring Viking Tappi, who, together with his friends, have various adventures. The main series have seven books, while the spin-off series, eight. Some of the books were also translated into Russian language. In 2019, the book series were adopted into the animated television series titled Tales of Tappi the Viking, with Mortka becoming a writer on all of its 13 episodes. They were animated by EGoFILM and distributed by Telewizja Polska via TVP VOD. Mortka

In 2012, he published horror fiction book Miasteczko Nonstead with Fabryka Słow. Between 2013 and 2016, he published trilogy of science fiction children's books, titled Zagubieni, with Zielona Sowa, with books Inwazja in 2013, Zwiad in 2014, and Misja ratunkowa in 2016. Between 2013 and 2015, he published young adult fiction trilogy titled Pod Pękniętym Niebem, with Zielona Sowa, with books Dom pod Pękniętym Niebem in 2013, Droga pod Pękniętym Niebem in 2014, and Wojna pod Pękniętym Niebem in 2015. In 2013 and 2015, he published fantasy books Morza Wszeteczne and Wyspy Plugawe with Uroboros publishing house. In 2013, he had also published Listy lorda Bathursta, a historical fiction book published by Fabryka Słow, and Ostatni rycerz, a fantasy book published by Wilga publishing house. In 2014, he published a children's book duology titled Przygody rycerza Valdemara, with Wilga, with books Worek pełen duchów and Podskakujący zamek.

In 2016, he published fantasy book Projekt Mefisto in W.A.B. publishing house. In 2017, he published fantasy book Królewska Talia with Zielona Sowa.

Between 2021 and 2022, Mortka, with SQN publishing house, had published five fantasy books in the series titled Nie ma tego Złego. They were: Nie ma tego Złego, Głodna puszcza, Przed wyruszeniem w drogę, Skrzynia pełna dusz, and Koszyczek dla Doli. In 2021, he continued his books Morza Wszeteczne and Wyspy Plugawe, with book Zaułki St. Naarten, published with SQN. In 2022, he had continued his books Martwe Jezioro and Druga Burza, with the book Mroźny szlak. Straceńcy Madsa Voortena. Tom 1, published with SQN.

He also works as a tour guide and a teacher and English and Norwegian languages. He owns Szkoła Językowa "Willows" language school in Poznań, Poland.

== Private life ==
Mortka has a wife and children and lives in Poznań, Poland.

== Bibliography ==
=== Novels ===
==== Trylogia nordycka ====
- 2003: Ostatnia saga (Runa, reedited and republished by Uroboros in 2015)
- 2004: Wojna runów (Runa, reedited and republished by Uroboros in 2015)
- 2007: Świt po bitwie (Runa, reedited and republished by Uroboros in 2015)

==== Karaibska krucjata ====
- 2005: Karaibska krucjata. Płonący Union Jack (Runa, republished in 2011 by Fabryka Słów)
- 2006: Karaibska krucjata. La Tumba de los Piratas (Runa republished in 2011 by Fabryka Słów)

==== Ragnarok 1940 ====
- 2007: Ragnarok 1940, tom 1 (Fabryka Słów)
- 2008: Ragnarok 1940, tom 2 (Fabryka Słów)

==== Miecz i kwiaty ====
- 2008: Miecz i kwiaty, tom 1 (Fabryka Słów)
- 2009: Miecz i kwiaty, tom 2 (Fabryka Słów)
- 2010: Miecz i kwiaty, tom 3 (Fabryka Słów)

==== Przygody Madsa Voortena ====
- 2011: Martwe Jezioro (Fabryka Słów)
- 2012: Druga Burza (Fabryka Słów)
- 2022: Mroźny szlak. Straceńcy Madsa Voortena. Tom 1 (Sine Qua Non)

==== Opowieści o wikingu Tappim ====
- 2012: Przygody Tappiego z Szepczącego Lasu (Zielona Sowa)
- 2013: Podróże Tappiego po Szumiących Morzach (Zielona Sowa)
- 2014: Wędrówki Tappiego po Mruczących Górach (Zielona Sowa)
- 2015: Tarapaty Tappiego w Magicznym Ogrodzie (Zielona Sowa)
- 2016: Wyprawa Tappiego na Ognistą Wyspę (Zielona Sowa)
- 2018: Ekspedycja Tappiego w Wielkie Nieznane (Zielona Sowa)
- 2020: Powrót Tappiego do Szepczącego Lasu (Zielona Sowa)

==== Tappi i przyjaciele ====
- 2013: Tappi i urodzinowe ciasto (Zielona Sowa)
- 2013: Tappi i pierwszy śnieg (Zielona Sowa)
- 2014: Tappi i niezwykłe miejsce (Zielona Sowa)
- 2014: Tappi i poduszka dla Chichotka (Zielona Sowa)
- 2015: Tappi i wielka burza (Zielona Sowa)
- 2015: Tappi i wspaniała przyjaźń (Zielona Sowa)
- 2015: O tym, jak na Szepczący Las padł czar (Zielona Sowa)
- 2018: Tappi i tajemnica bułeczek Bollego (Zielona Sowa)

==== Zagubieni ====
- 2013: Zagubieni. Inwazja (Zielona Sowa)
- 2014: Zagubieni. Zwiad (Zielona Sowa)
- 2016: Zagubieni. Misja Ratunkowa (Zielona Sowa)

==== Pod Pękniętym Niebem ====
- 2013: Dom pod Pękniętym Niebem (Zielona Sowa)
- 2014: Droga pod Pękniętym Niebem (Zielona Sowa)
- 2015: Wojna pod Pękniętym Niebem (Zielona Sowa)

==== Morza Wszeteczne ====
- 2013: Morza Wszeteczne (Uroboros)
- 2015: Wyspy Plugawe (Uroboros)
- 2021: Zaułki St. Naarten (Sine Qua Non)

==== Przygody rycerza Valdemara ====
- 2014: Worek pełen duchów (Wilga)
- 2014: Podskakujący zamek (Wilga)

==== Nie ma tego Złego ====
- 2021: Nie ma tego Złego (Sine Qua Non)
- 2021: Głodna puszcza (Sine Qua Non)
- 2022: Przed wyruszeniem w drogę (Sine Qua Non)
- 2022: Skrzynia pełna dusz (Sine Qua Non)
- 2022: Koszyczek dla Doli (Sine Qua Non)

==== Other novels ====
- 2012: Miasteczko Nonstead (Fabryka Słów)
- 2013: Listy lorda Bathursta (Fabryka Słów)
- 2013: Ostatni rycerz (Wilga)
- 2016: Projekt Mefisto (W.A.B.)
- 2017: Królewska Talia (Zielona Sowa)

=== Short stories ===
- 2003: Smocze Nasienie (Science Fiction, issue 31, October 2003)
- 2003: 1410 czyli cała prawda o Grunwaldzie (Fahrenheit, issue 32)
- 2004: Czas bohaterów (Science Fiction, issue 43, October 2004), story related to book Wojna runów
- 2006: Smok, dziewica i salwy burtowe, part of anthology Księga Smoków (Runa)
- 2010: Antyplacebo (Science Fiction, Fantasy i Horror, issue 51, January 2010)
- 2011: Pasażer (Science Fiction, Fantasy i Horror, issue 69, July 2011)
- 2011: Impostorzy, part of anthology Strasznie mi się podobasz (Fabryka Słów)
- 2012: Błędny Rycerz, story written as part of promotional campaign of video game Risen 2: Dark Waters
- 2012: Wieczór przed egzekucją, oryginally written for book Listy lorda Bathursta, yet not included in final version, and published on Secretum web portal
- 2013: Czytając w ogniu, part of anthology Science fiction po polsku 2 (PaperBack)
- 2022: Zrzut, part of anthology Szepty (Sine Qua Non)

=== Translations to Polish ===
- 2002: HMS Surprise by Patrick O'Brian (Zysk i S-ka)
- 2003: The Mauritius Command (Polish title: Dowództwo na Mauritiusie) by Patrick O'Brian (Zysk i S-ka)
- 2004: The Far Side of the World (Polish title: Pan i władca) by Patrick O'Brian (Zysk i S-ka)
- 2004: Desolation Island (Polish title: Zapomniana wyspa) by Patrick O’Brian (Zysk i S-ka)
- 2004: Straydog (Polish title: Włóczęga) by Kathe Koja (Zysk i S-ka)
- 2005: Buddha Boy (Polish title: Młody Budda) by Kathe Koja (Zysk i S-ka)
- 2006: The Fortune of War (Polish title: Wojenne losy) by Patrick O'Brian (Zysk i S-ka)
- 2008: The Surgeon's Mate (Polish title: Mat lekarza pokładowego) by Patrick O'Brian (Zysk i S-ka)
- 2008: The Painted Man (Polish title: ''Malowany człowiek) by Peter V. Brett (Fabryka Słów)
- 2009: The Ionian Mission (Polish title: Jońska misja) by Patrick O'Brian (Zysk i S-ka)
- 2010: Treason's Harbour (Polish title: Port zdrady) by Patrick O'Brian (Zysk i S-ka)
- 2010: The Desert Spear (Polish title: Pustynna Włócznia) by Peter V. Brett (Fabryka Słów)
- 2010: The Mammoth Book Of Sorcerer's Tales (anthology) (Polish title: Wielka księga opowieści o czarodziejach) (Fabryka Słów)
- 2010: The Man Who Never Missed (Polish title: Człowiek, który nigdy nie chybiał) by Steve Perry (Fabryka Słów)
- 2010: Matadora by Steve Perry (Fabryka Słów)
- 2011: The Mammoth Book of Seriously Comic Fantasy (anthology) (Polish title: Wielka księga fantastycznego humoru) (Fabryka Słów)
- 2011: The Mammoth Book of Extreme Science Fiction (anthology) (Polish title: Wielka księga ekstremalnego SF (Fabryka Słów 2011)
- 2011: The Reverse of the Medal (Polish title: Druga strona medalu) by Patrick O'Brian (Zysk i S-ka)
- 2012: Legend (Polish title: Legenda. Rebeliant) by Marie Lu (Zielona Sowa)
- 2012: Prodigy (Polish title: Legenda. Wybraniec) by Marie Lu (Zielona Sowa)
- 2013: The Daylight War (Polish title: Wojna w blasku dnia) by Peter V. Brett (Fabryka Słów)
- 2013: Throne of Glass (Polish title: Szklany tron) by Sarah J. Maas (Uroboros 2013)
- 2013: W.A.R.P. The Reluctant Assassin (Polish title: P.R.A.S.K. Księga 1. Niechętny zabójca) by Eoin Colfer (W.A.B.)
- 2013: The Assassin and the Pirate Lord (Polish title: Zabójczyni i władca piratów) by Sarah J. Maas (Uroboros)
- 2014: The Assassin and the Desert (Polish title: Zabójczyni i Czerwona Pustynia) by Sarah J. Maas (Uroboros)
- 2014: Champion (Polish title: Legenda. Patriota) by Marie Lu (Zielona Sowa)
- 2014: Crown of Midnight (Polish title: Korona w mroku) by Sarah J. Maas (Uroboros)
- 2014: The Assassin and the Underworld (Polish title: Zabójczyni i podziemny świat) by Sarah J. Maas (Uroboros)
- 2014: The Letter of Marque (Polish title: List kaperski) by Patrick O'Brian (Zysk i S-ka)
- 2015: The Arrivals (Polish title: Przybysze) by Melissa Marr (Uroboros)
- 2015: The Assassin and the Empire (Polish title: Zabójczyni i imperium Adarlanu) by Sarah J. Maas (Uroboros)
- 2015: Tarkin by James Luceno (Uroboros)

=== Articles ===
- 1996: Drzwi do lasu (Magia i Miecz, August 1996)
- 1996: Warhammer a storytelling (Magia i Miecz, September 1996)
- 1996: Wsi spokojna, wsi wesoła (Magia i Miecz, August–September 1996)
- 1997: Wszystkie drogi prowadzą do Liczyrzepy (Magia i Miecz, October 1997)
- 1998: Krasnoludy nie gęsi (Magia i Miecz, January 1998)
- 1998: Sesja (Magia i Miecz, April 1998)
- 1998: Krew na nadmorskim piasku (Magia i Miecz, September 1998)
- 1999: King Size (Magia i Miecz, February 1999)
- 1999: Warhiwum X (Magia i Miecz, August–September 1999)
- 1999: Krasnoludologia (Magia i Miecz, October 1999)
- 2000: O końcu świata opowieść smętna (Magia i Miecz, September 2000)
- 2000: Teraz ja o niekonwencji (Magia i Miecz, October 2000)
- 2002: Nie będzie Kislev pluł nam w twarz (Portal, issue 8, May 2002)
- 2002: Wczasy u wód (Portal, issue 11, November 2002)
- 2003: Klucz do Świątyni Salomona (Portal, issue 12, January 2003)
- 2003: Słońce, kurz i zakute łby (Portal, issue 13, March 2003)
- 2003: Special Effects (Portal, issue 17, November 2003)

== Filmography ==
=== Screenwriter ===
- 2019: Tales of Tappi the Viking (13 episodes)
