= Tales of Tappi the Viking =

2019 children's animated series

- Official poster
- Based on: Tappi the Viking by Marcin Mortka
- Written by: Marcin Mortka; Marcin Graj
- Voices of: Piotr Fronczewski; Antoni Pawlicki
- Composer: Rafał Rozmus
- Country of origin: Poland
- Original language: Polish
- No. of seasons: 1
- No. of episodes: 13

Production
- Producer: Ewelina Gordziejuk
- Running time: 11 minutes
- Production company: EGoFILM

Original release
- Network: Telewizja Polska
- Release: 6 December – 18 December 2019

Tales of Tappi the Viking (Polish: Wiking Tappi), also known as Viking Tappi, is a Polish-language children's animated series based on the series of children's books Tappi the Viking by Marcin Mortka. The series was developed by EGoFILM studio, and distributed by Telewizja Polska via TVP VOD streaming service. The show has one season with thirteen episodes. It premiered from 6 to 18 December 2019.

== Premise ==
Tappi the Viking lives in the Whispering Forest, which stretches along the banks of the Gulf of Ice. Tappi is in fact a defender whispering forest and all its inhabitants, including his friends, Chichotek the reindeer, Paplak the Raven, hunter Haste, and blacksmith Sigurd.

== Cast ==
- Piotr Fronczewski as Tappi the Viking
- Antoni Pawlicki as Chichotek
- Jerzy Słonka as Brzuchacz the Bear (episode 1)
- Cezary Kwieciński as Pasibrzuch the Merchant (episode 1)
- Tomasz Marzecki:
  - Gburek the Troll (episode 1)
  - Paplak (episodes 2–3, 6–10, 13)
- Julia Kołakowska as Śmigaczka the Squirrel (episode 1)
- Dariusz Błażejewski as the wind (episode 1)
- Jakub Wieczorek as the oak (episode 2)
- Piotr Bąk:
  - mountains (episode 2)
  - giant (episode 2)
  - spruce (episode 3)
- Przemysław Glapiński as the Beaver (episode 3)
- Kamil Pruban:
  - rock (episode 3)
  - male villager (episode 4)
  - bandit (episode 8)
  - Głabrzych (episode 10–11)
- Andrzej Chudy:
  - Pasibrzuch the Merchant (episodes 3–4, 7, 11)
  - gnome (episode 8)
- Karolina Kalina-Bulcewicz:
  - Anna (episode 3)
  - female villager (episode 4)
  - aquatic warbler (episode 5)
- Jacek Kopczyński:
  - storyteller (episode 4)
- Surkol (episode 6)
- Jacek Król as Gburek (episoded 4–5, 10–11)
- Joanna Pach:
  - elf (episode 4)
  - female guard (episode 6)
- Agnieszka Kunikowska as elf (episode 4)
- Maciej Kosmala as Kapuch (episode 5)
- Janusz German:
  - Sigurd (episodes 5–6)
  - Wodnik (episodes 5–6)
- Karol Osentowski:
  - gnome (episode 6)
  - bandit (episode 7)
- Grzegorz Kwiecień:
  - male guard (episode 6)
  - Nils (episode 6)
- Elżbieta Jędrzejewska:
  - Miss Sowa (episode 6)
  - Skrzypicha (episode 7)
- Leszek Zduń:
  - eagle (episode 6)
  - Węchacz (episode 8)
  - Magnus (episode 8)
- Bartosz Wesołowski:
  - bandit (episode 8)
  - gnome (episode 10)
  - Magnus (episode 10)
- Agnieszka Fajlhauer as female gnome (episode 8)
- Robert Jarociński:
  - gnome (episode 8)
  - Grzmocich (episode 11)
- Michał Konarski as Haste (episode 8)
- Mikołaj Klimek:
  - Buuulgot (episodes 9, 13)
  - Chrapak (episode 13)
- Marek Robaczewski as Batochlast (episode 9)
- Artur Dziurman as Ciastkożer the Chief (episode 10)
- Katarzyna Kozak as Skrzypicha (episodes 10–11)
- Anna Ułas as Grzmocichowa (episodes 11)
- Maksymilian Bogumił as Bum (episode 12)
- Tomasz Olejnik as Ciach (episode 12)
- Maksymilian Michasiów as Łup (episode 12)

== Production ==
The television series were based on the series of children's books about Tappi the Viking by Marcin Mortka. They were produced by Ewelina Gordziejuk, and written by Marcin Mortka and Marcin Graj. The episodes were directed by Andrzej Piotr Morawski, Tessa Moult-Milewska, Maciej Kur, Marian Cholerek, Ewa Borysewicz, Marcin Podolec, Kacper Zamarło, Łukasz Kacprowicz, and Marcin Graj. The music was done by Rafał Rozmus. The television series were produced by EGoFILM and distributed by Telewizja Polska via TVP VOD streaming service. Its first season has 13 episodes, each lasting 11 minutes, which aired from 6 to 18 December 2019.

== Episodes ==
No.	Title	Directed by	Written by	Storyboarded by	Original release date
1	"Zamieszanie z zimowymi zapasami"	Andrzej Piotr Morawski	Marcin Mortka	Andrzej Piotr Morawski	6 December 2019
2	"Przeogromny kłopot"	Andrzej Piotr Morawski	Marcin Mortka; Marcin Graj	Andrzej Piotr Morawski	7 December 2019
3	"Magiczna kołyska"	Andrzej Piotr Morawski	Marcin Mortka; Marcin Graj	Andrzej Piotr Morawski	8 December 2019
4	"Opowieść gawędziarza"	Tessa Moult-Milewska	Marcin Mortka; Marcin Graj	Paweł Modzelewski	9 December 2019
5	"Awantura z wodnikami"	Maciej Kur	Marcin Mortka; Marcin Graj	Piotr Bednarczyk	10 December 2019
6	"Podstęp Jarla Surkola"	Marian Cholerek	Marcin Mortka; Marcin Graj	Marian Cholerek	11 December 2019
7	"Czary wiedź Szkrzypichy"	Andrzej Piotr Morawski	Marcin Mortka; Marcin Graj	Andrzej Piotr Morawski	12 December 2019
8	"Obrońcy wioski Dębinki"	Maciej Kur	Marcin Mortka; Marcin Graj	Agata Mianowska	13 December 2019
9	"W obronie przed śnieżycą"	Ewa Borysewicz	Marcin Mortka; Marcin Graj	Piotr Bednarczyk	14 December 2019
10	"Bitwa o Szepczący Las"	Marcin Podolec	Marcin Mortka; Marcin Graj	Tomasz Kaczkowski	15 December 2019
11	"Kiepski poranek olbrzyma Grzmocicha"	Łukasz Kacprowicz	Marcin Mortka; Marcin Graj	Oleksandr Baranov	16 December 2019
12	"Leśna pułapka"	Marcin Graj	Marcin Mortka; Marcin Graj	Piotr Bednarczyk	17 December 2019
13	"Telenty Tappiego"	Tessa Moult-Milewska	Marcin Mortka; Marcin Graj	Paweł Modzelewski	18 December 2019
