= Teletoon (disambiguation) =

Teletoon is a Canadian TV channel that launched in 1997 as a bilingual service. The French-language version, Télétoon, was launched on September 8, 1997. Its English-language counterpart, now known as Cartoon Network (Canadian TV channel), launched the following month on October 17.

Teletoon may also refer to:

- Teletoon+, the streaming platform for Cartoon Network Canada
- Teletoon+, formerly Minimax Poland and ZigZap; a Polish TV channel
- Télétoon+, formerly Télétoon; a French TV channel that launched in 1996
