= How I Fell in Love with a Gangster =

- Polish: Jak pokochalam gangstera
- Directed by: Maciej Kawulski
- Written by: Krzysztof Gureczny; Maciej Kawulski
- Starring: Tomasz Wlosok; Aleks Kurdzielewicz; Antoni Królikowski
- Production company: Open Mind Production
- Distributed by: Netflix
- Release date: 12 January 2022
- Country: Poland
- Language: Polish

How I Fell in Love with a Gangster (Polish: Jak pokochałam gangstera) is a 2022 Polish film directed by Maciej Kawulski, written by Krzysztof Gureczny and Maciej Kawulski and starring Tomasz Wlosok, Aleks Kurdzielewicz and Antoni Królikowski.

== Plot ==
The film tells the story of the rise and fall of Nikodem 'Nikoś' Skotarczak. Nikoś was born in Gdańsk, to a father who abused and beat him. As he grows up, he gathers around him a gang of delinquents, led by his good friend 'Komo'. At first, Nikoś and his gang engage in petty crime, but later they begin stealing cars from Germany and selling them in Poland. This business yields them enormous profits and turns Nikoś into the underworld ruler of the Polish coastal area.

== Cast ==
- Tomasz Włosok as Nikodem 'Nikoś' Skotarczak
- Aleks Kurdzielewicz as Young Nikodem Skotarczak
- Antoni Królikowski as 'Komo'
- Agnieszka Grochowska as Milena 'Czarna'
- Magdalena Lamparska as Halina Ostrowska
- Krystyna Janda as Rita
- Klaudiusz Kaufmann as Karl
- Eryk Lubos as 'Kleks'
- Sebastian Fabijański as 'Silvio'
- Julia Wieniawa as Nikita
- Mikolaj Kubacki as Piotr Kamcz
- Dawid Ogrodnik as Andrzej 'Pershing' Kolikowski

== Reception ==
Marc Miller of Ready Steady Cut called the film "an utterly ridiculous Goodfellas wannabe". He criticized the lack of detail surrounding Nikoś's criminal activities and describes it as over formulaic. Aurora Amidon, writing for Paste, called the film "groundbreaking" but "derivative". Barbara Jaros of Onet.pl criticized the film's "mythologization of criminal life" and called it a male fantasy. She also noted the portrayal of women as "submissive [and] passive [...] grateful for every crumb of interest".

The last wife of real Nikodem Skotarczak sued Maciej Kawulski, Open Mind Production and Netflix due to the fact that the film "How I Fell in Love with a Gangster" infringes her personal rights such as dignity, good name, privacy and the cult of memory of a deceased person.
