= The Daylight War =

2013 fantasy novel by Peter V. Brett

- Author: Peter V. Brett
- Cover artist: Larry Rostant
- Language: English
- Series: The Demon Cycle
- Genre: Fantasy, Horror
- Publisher: HarperCollins (UK); Del Rey Books (US)
- Publication date: February 12, 2013
- Publication place: United Kingdom
- Media type: Print (hardback)
- Pages: 704
- ISBN: 978-0-34-552415-7
- Preceded by: The Desert Spear
- Followed by: The Skull Throne

The Daylight War is a fantasy novel written by American writer Peter V. Brett. It is the third book in the Demon Cycle series. It was released on February 12, 2013.

== Reception ==
Starburst's Alister Davison praised Brett's character development and noted that "there's never a dull moment" in the novel. SF Site's Dominic Cilli noted the series was filled with "fantasy clichés and borrowed ideas", but still found the book highly enjoyable. Tor.com's Robert H. Bedford "enjoyed the novel immensely", and only had a few quibbles with the writing such as the abrupt ending. It has been nominated for the David Gemmell Awards for Fantasy.
