= Marzenna Adamczyk =

Polish politician

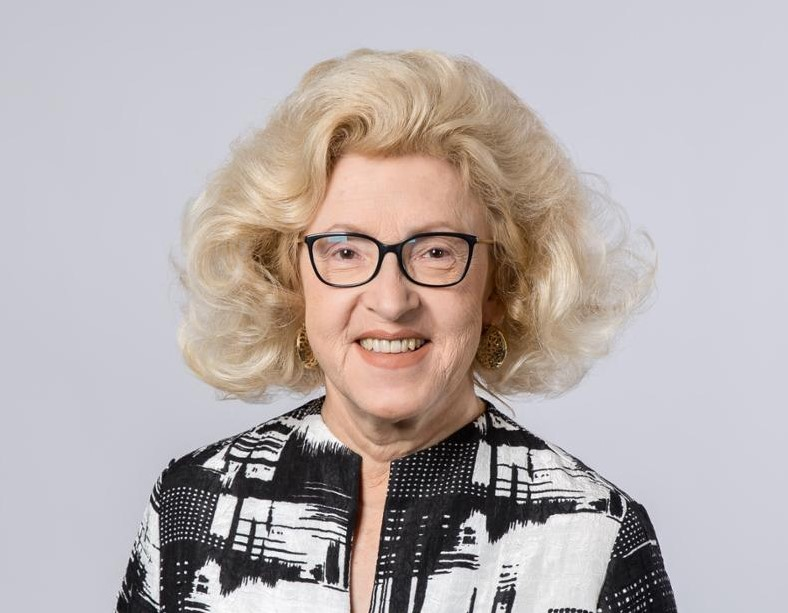

Poland Ambassador to Cuba
- In office 2007–2010
- Preceded by: Tomasz Turowski
- Succeeded by: Małgorzata Galińska-Tomaszewska

Poland Ambassador to Spain
- In office 2016 – 31 August 2021
- Preceded by: Tomasz Arabski
- Succeeded by: Anna Sroka

Personal details
- Born: 1956 (age 69–70)
- Education: University of Warsaw
- Profession: Diplomat, academic

Marzenna Adamczyk (Polish pronunciation: [maʐ'ɛnna ad'amt͡ʂɨk]; born 1956) is a Polish translator and diplomat, who served as Poland Ambassador to Cuba (2007–2010) and Spain (2016–2021).

== Life ==
Adamczyk graduated from Hispanic studies at the University of Warsaw (M.A., 1980). Following her studies, she taught Spanish history and language at the university. She was also a translator of Spanish-language literature and editor at several book publishing companies, including Polish Scientific Publishers PWN.

In 1999, she joined the Polish diplomatic service. Between 1999 and 2005 she was First Secretary and culture Counsellor at the embassy in Madrid. At that time she was awarded by the Spanish Theatre Directors Association “Tarasca”. Following her work at the embassy, she was deputy director of the University of Warsaw Institute of Iberian and Ibero-American Studies (2005–2007).

In 2007, she was nominated as the Polish ambassador to Cuba, presenting her credentials on 19 October 2007. She ended her term on 15 September 2010. During her tenure, she managed to carry out visit of Polish minister in Cuba, first since 1989. Between December 2010 and 2013 she was Consul General in Barcelona. After that she was back at the University of Warsaw, working as a lecturer. In October 2016 she became Polish ambassador to Spain, presenting her letter of credence to the king Felipe VI of Spain on 19 January 2017. On 3 March 2017 she was accredited to Andorra as well. She ended her term on 31 August 2021.

== Languages spoken ==
Besides Polish, she speaks English, Spanish, Portuguese and Russian languages.
