= Hyper+ =

Former Polish television programming block broadcast on Teletoon+

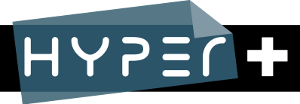
- Network: Teletoon+
- Launched: September 1, 2001
- Closed: July 1, 2014
- Country of origin: Poland
- Owner: ITI Neovision SA
- Formerly known as: Hyper (until 1 October 2011)
- Format: Computer gaming, Esports, Anime
- Official website: www.hyperplus.pl

Hyper+ (formerly Hyper) was a Polish television programming block broadcast on Teletoon+ from 1 September 2001 to 1 July 2014. At launch, it replaced Game One-branded block, which was broadcast on the channel from 1 August 1999 (when the channel was known as Minimax at the time) until 31 August 2001. It showed the computer gaming and Japanese anime series. It was shown every night from 10pm to 2am, Polish time.

== History ==
Hyper first appeared on television screens on September 1, 2001, replacing the similarly themed channel Game One. In accordance with the administration of the Canal+, Hyper was intended to be an adult complement to the children's television channel MiniMax (later ZigZap, currently Teletoon+). Hyper was initially broadcast from 8:00 p.m to 12:00 a.m., from March 2005 to August 2011 it was broadcast from 9:00 p.m. to 01:00 a.m., while in the final years of its existence it was broadcast from 9:00 p.m. to 12:00 a.m. (September 2011 – August 2012), from 21:30 to 01:00 (September 2012 – August 2013) and from 10:00 p.m. to 2:00 a.m. (September 2013 – June 2014). On April 1, 2010, the Hyper programming block changed its logo and graphics and began broadcasting all programs in 16:9 format. On November 11, 2011, the "+" sign was appended to the channel name and an HDTV version of the channel was launched. On September 1, 2012, Hyper+ changed its broadcasting time from 9:30 p.m. to 1:00 a.m. On September 1, 2013, Hyper+ changed its broadcast time from 10:00 p.m. to 2:00 a.m. On July 1, 2014, Teletoon+ enlarged its broadcast hours at the expense of Hyper+, thus disestablishing the block.

== Logos ==
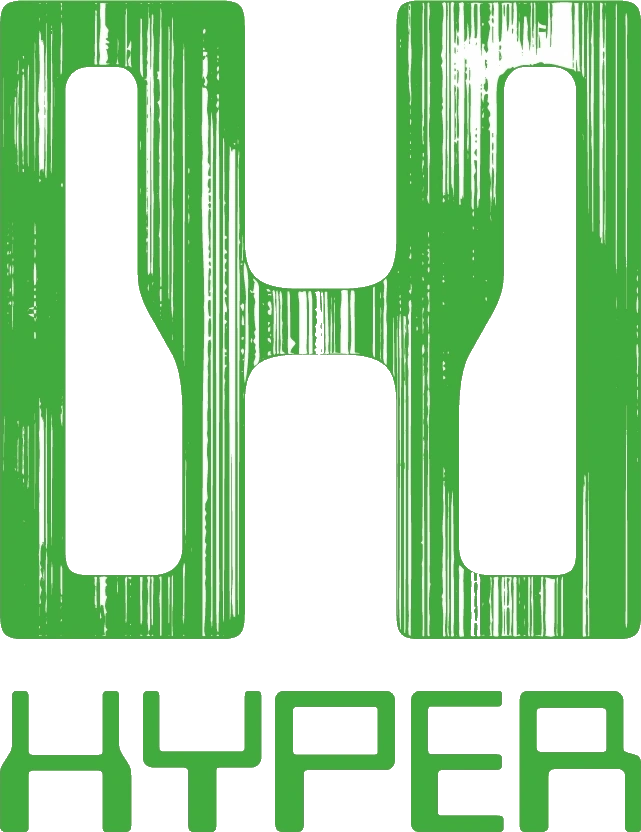
2001-2010

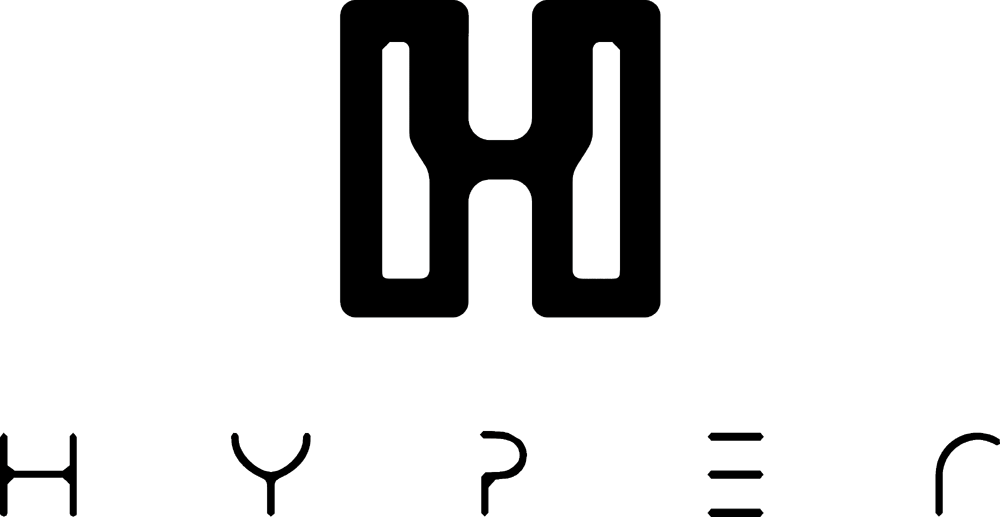
2010-2011

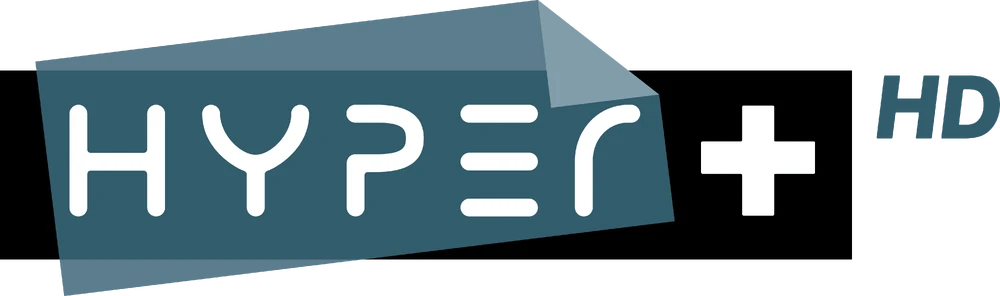
HD 2011-2014

2011-2014
