= Peter V. Brett =

American writer (born 1973)

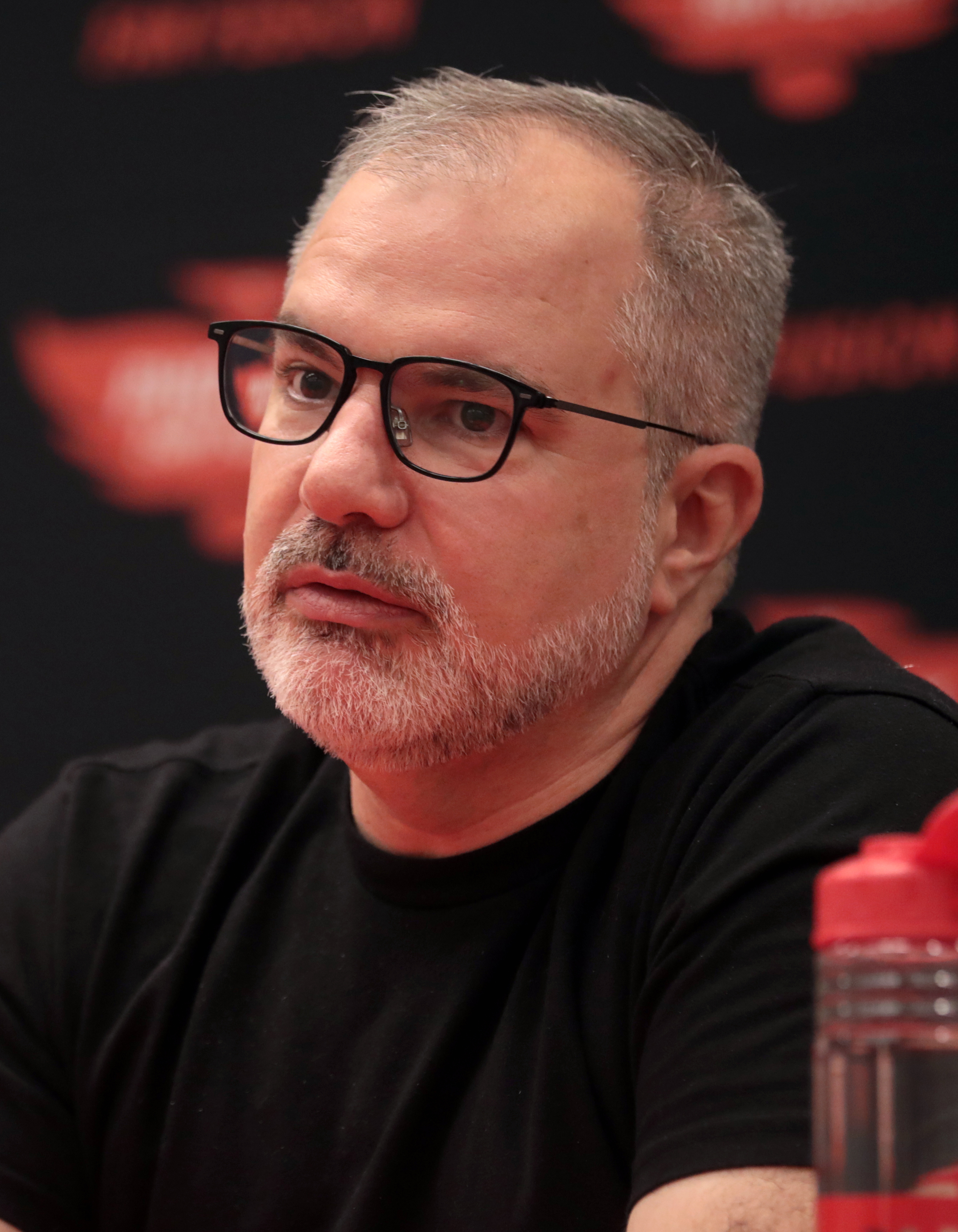
- Brett at the 2022 Phoenix Fan Fusion
- Born: February 8, 1973 (age 53); New Rochelle, New York, U.S.
- Education: University at Buffalo (BA)
- Occupation: Novelist
- Website: http://www.petervbrett.com

Peter V. Brett (born February 8, 1973) is an American fantasy novelist. He is the author of the Demon Cycle, whose first volume was published in the UK by HarperCollins's Voyager imprint in 2008 as The Painted Man and in the US by Del Rey Books as The Warded Man.

== Early life ==
Peter Brett studied English Literature and Art History at the University at Buffalo, graduating in 1995. He developed an interest in fantasy, comic books, and role-playing games from an early age. He then spent more than ten years working in medical publication before resigning to become a full-time writer after his royalty income surpassed his salary.

== Career ==
Brett wrote his 2008 novel The Painted Man (The Warded Man in the US) and much of his second novel on his HP iPaq 6515 while commuting on the New York City subway. Following its publication, the novel achieved commercial success, leading to his placement on the New York Times Best Seller list.

The novel takes place on a formerly advanced civilization world that has now been reduced to a dark age by the attacks of demons known as Corelings. These are powerful beings with magical abilities and differing elemental natures, and each night they emerge from the planet's core to feed on humans, who must take care to be indoors before dark. Against this backdrop the three main characters Arlen, Leesha, and Rojer, pass into maturity and begin individual quests to bring an end to the terror. The book and its sequels have been translated into twenty three languages, including German, French, Greek, Japanese, Russian, Polish, Czech, Spanish, Portuguese, Indonesian, Chinese, Dutch, Korean, Estonian, Turkish, Italian, Serbian, Bulgarian, Hungarian, Romanian, Brazilian Portuguese and Danish.

In The Desert Spear two men are claimed by their own followers to be humanity's prophesied Deliverer. One is Arlen Bales, formerly of a small hamlet who, after many hard lessons, has become the Warded Man (so called because he has covered himself in demon-warding runes). Another contender is a desert warrior, a former friend and betrayer of Arlen, who carries a mystical spear (stolen from Arlen) and heads a vast army intent on a holy war against the demons and anyone else who stands in the way.

Brett's novellas include the 2010 book The Great Bazaar and Other Stories, the 2011 book Brayan's Gold, and the 2014 book Messenger's Legacy.

The Demon Cycle novel has sold over 3.5 million copies worldwide.

=== Writing process and themes ===
The primary narrative arc of The Demon Cycle centers around the clash of civilizations and the evolving relationship between its core protagonists, Arlen Bales and Ahmann Jardir. Brett outlines his works extensively in advance; the resolution and major story beats of the five-book main series were established in 2007, prior to the publication of the first novel.

In addition to novels, Brett has expanded his work into comic book writing, notably working on Dynamite Entertainment's Red Sonja, an experience he noted required a distinct narrative skillset. Among his unpublished works is an unreleased 100-page erotic novella set in the universe of The Demon Cycle.

Polish illustrator Dominik Broniek created the illustrations for the Polish editions of his books published by Fabryka Słów, which were subsequently adopted for international releases worldwide.

== Personal life ==
Brett lives in Manhattan with his wife Lauren and his child Phoenix and daughter Sirena. He also enjoys comics and role playing games.

== Bibliography ==
=== The Demon Cycle ===
1. The Painted Man (UK title; Voyager, 1 September 2008) (US title The Warded Man; Del Rey, March 2009)
2. The Desert Spear (Del Rey, March 27, 2010)
3. The Daylight War (Del Rey, February 12, 2013)
4. The Skull Throne (Del Rey, March 31, 2015)
5. The Core (Del Rey, October 3, 2017)

Novellas

- The Great Bazaar and Brayan’s Gold (2015)

(Takes place during “The Painted Man”)

- Messenger's Legacy (2014)

(Takes place between “Daylight War” and “The Skull Throne”)

- Barren (2018)

(Takes place during “The Core”, with significant flashbacks to before “The Painted Man”)

Short Story

- Mudboy, included in Unfettered from Grim Oak Press (May 2013) (Included in “Messenger’s Legacy” Novella)

=== The Nightfall Saga ===
Set 15 years after The Core

1. The Desert Prince (August 3, 2021)
2. The Hidden Queen (March 5, 2024)
3. The Demon King (April 7, 2026)

=== Comic Books ===
- Red Sonja:
  - Red Sonja: Unchained, published by Dynamite Comics (March 19, 2014)
