= Wojciech Paszkowski =

Polish actor (1960–2024)

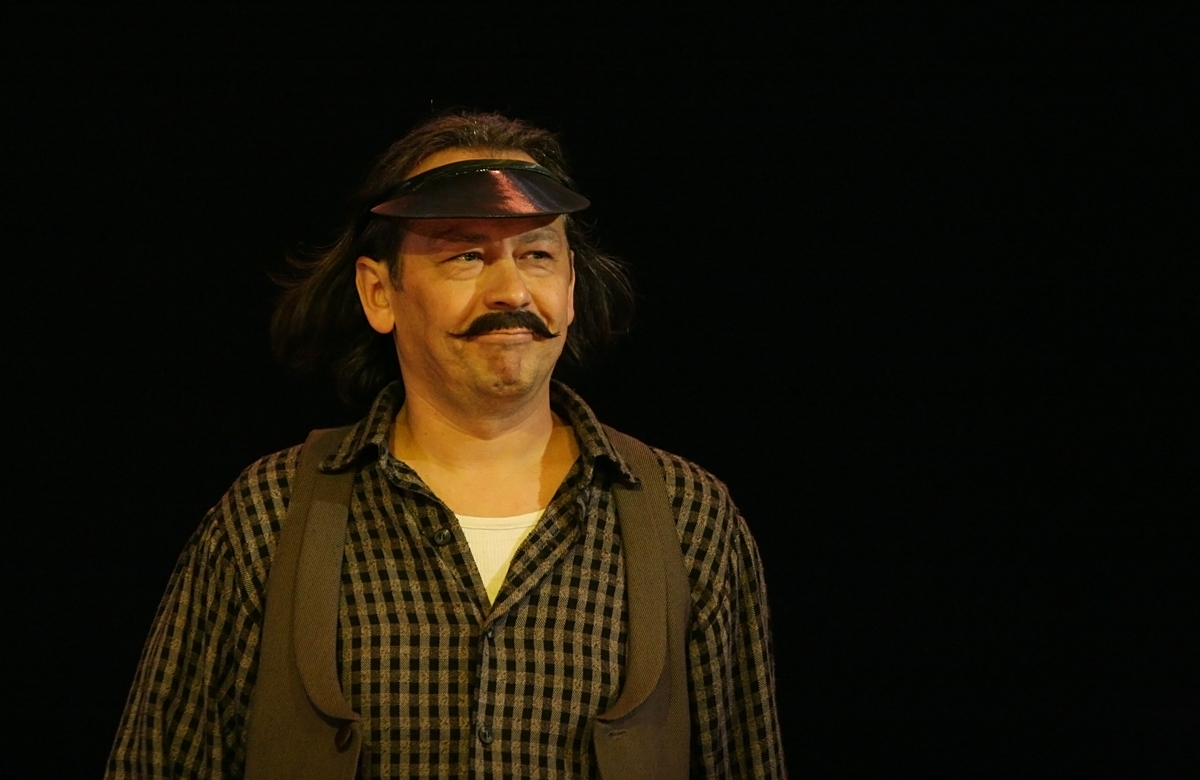
- Paszkowski on stage in 2008
- Born: 28 February 1960; Warsaw, Poland
- Died: 23 August 2024 (aged 64)
- Resting place: Skolimów Parish Cemetery, Konstancin-Jeziorna, Poland
- Education: Aleksander Zelwerowicz National Academy of Dramatic Art
- Occupations: Actor; dubbing director
- Years active: 1985–2024

Wojciech Paszkowski (Polish: [ˈvɔj.t͡ɕɛx paʂˈkɔf.ski]; 28 February 1960 – 23 August 2024) was a stage, film, television and voice actor, and dubbing director.

== Biography ==
Wojciech Paszkowski was born on 28 February 1960 in Warsaw, Poland.

In 1986 he graduated from the Aleksander Zelwerowicz National Academy of Dramatic Art in Warsaw, with a degree in acting. He debuted theatrically in 1985, in the play Złe zachowanie directed by Andrzej Strzelecki, in the Ateneum Theatre in Warsaw.

He spent most of his career in Warsaw. From 1985 to 1987 he performed in the Stołeczna Estrada, and from 1987 to 2000 in the Rampa Theatre. He also performed occasionally in Ateneum Theatre (1984–1986), Roma Musical Theatre (2000–2004, 2015–2021), and Studio Buffo (2004, 2011–2015), as well as outside the city, in the Danuta Baduszkowa Musical Theatre in Gdynia (1996), the Wojciech Bogusławski Theatre in Kalisz (1996), and the Grand Theatre in Łódź (2009).

Paszkowski also acted in television series such as The Clan (1998–1999, 2017–2018), L for Love (2001–2003, 2010, 2017), Król przedmieścia (2002), Plebania (2003–2005), Na Wspólnej (2005, 2015–2016), Mrok (2006), Na dobre i na złe (2006, 2020), Faceci do wzięcia (2007–2008), and Father Matthew (2015). Paszkowski was also a voice actor involved in Polish-language dubbing. Among his notable roles, he Andy Anderson in Life With Louis, Heinz Doofenshmirtz in Phineas and Ferb, Mike Wazowski in Monsters, Inc. and Monsters University, Maurice in Madagascar, Julius Caesar in Asterix & Obelix: Mission Cleopatra, and Boba Fett and clone troopers in Star Wars: Episode II – Attack of the Clones and Star Wars: Episode III – Revenge of the Sith. He also was a director of numerous dubbing productions for films and television series.

He suffered a stroke in 2018 and 2022. Following the first attack, he limited his professional activity, and underwent a rehabilitation.

Paszkowski died on 23 August 2024, at the age of 64. He was buried at the Skolimów Parish Cemetery in Konstancin-Jeziorna near Warsaw.

== Filmography ==
=== Films ===
Year	Title	Role	Notes
1984	Kilka scen z życia Glebowa		Television play
1985	Rośliny trujące	Wedding guest	Feature film
1986	Przygody Sindbada żeglarza i jego wuja Tarabuka	Ship crewmember	Television play
1988	Czarodziej z Harlemu		Feature film
1989	Małżeństwo Marii Kowalskiej	Lieutenant	Television play
1991	Kolejka		Television play
1993	Three Colours: White	Police officer	Feature film
1993	Love		Television play
1994	Żółta szlafmyca albo kolęda na nowy rok	Christmas caroller	Television play
1996	Film		Television play
2003	O krasnalach i Wigilii		Feature film; voice
2004	The Secret of Fern Flower	Boss	Feature film; voice
2006	Mokra bajeczka		Short film; voice
2008	Król i królik	Narrator	Short film; voice
2009	Złoty środek	Robert	Feature film
2010	Esencja dnia	Correspondent	Short film; voice
2012	Stypan		Short film
2018	La Campanella		Short film

=== Television series ===
Year	Title	Role	Notes
1998–1999, 2017–2018	The Clan	Stanisław Kowalik	19 episodes
1999	Czternaście bajek z Królestwa Lailonii Leszka Kołakowskiego	Ubi	Voice; episode: "Jak bóg Maior utracił tron" (no. 8)
2000	Pucuś	Journalist	3 episodes
2001–2003	L for Love	Police officer, Jacek Milecki's friend	6 episodes
2010	L for Love	Bożena Chojnacka's friend	Episode no. 726
2017	L for Love	Franciszek Halicki	2 episode
2002	Król przedmieścia	Veterinarian	Episode: "Zdrowie" (no. 6)
2002	Król przedmieścia	Medium	Voice; episode: "Strefa X" (no. 13)
2002	Baśnie i bajki polskie	Wizard	Voice; episode: "Szklana góra" (no. 1)
2002	Baśnie i bajki polskie	Antoni	Voice; episode: "Szklana góra" (no. 1)
2003	Baśnie i bajki polskie	Black swan / Prince	Voice; episode: "Lodowa góra" (no. 5)
2003	Baśnie i bajki polskie	Kacper	Voice; episode: "Żywa woda" (no. 6)
2003	Baśnie i bajki polskie	Dragon	Voice; episode: "Żywa woda" (no. 6)
2004	Baśnie i bajki polskie	Nobelman	Voice; episode: "O kowalu i diable" (no. 7)
2004	Baśnie i bajki polskie	Bird	Voice; episode: "O kowalu i diable" (no. 7)
2004	Baśnie i bajki polskie	Blacksmith Ostroga	Voice; episode: "Bazyliszek" (no. 8)
2004	Baśnie i bajki polskie	Dragon	Voice; episode: "Bazyliszek" (no. 8)
2004	Baśnie i bajki polskie	Animal trainer	Voice; episode: "Smok Wawelski" (no. 10)
2005	Baśnie i bajki polskie	Older prince	Voice; episode: "O królewnie zaklętej w żabie" (no. 13)
2005	Baśnie i bajki polskie	Senator Gruby	Voice; episode: "O królewnie zaklętej w żabie" (no. 13)
2003	Psie serce	Dog	Voice; 3 episodes
2003	Kosmici	Mundek Ludzikiewicz	3 episodes
2003	Plebania	Fake police officer	Episode no. 261
2005	Plebania	Polish person	Episode no. 498
2005	Chicken Soup Fortune	Ruszkowski	Episode: "Zmiana klimatu" (no. 46)
2005	Na Wspólnej	Danielewicz	3 episodes
2015–2016	Na Wspólnej	Jurek Kamys	11 episodes
2006
2006	Mrok	Trup	Episode: "Temida" (no. 8)
2006	Kochaj mnie, kochaj!	Mistrz 69	
2006	Na dobre i na złe	Janusz Szażyłło	Episode: "Kocia mama" (no. 252)
2020	Na dobre i na złe	Gruchała	Episode: "Gorzkie curkierki" (no. 788)
2007–2008	Faceci do wzięcia	Stefan Makowski	3 episodes
2008	Fantazy the Bear	Fat Bill	Voice; episode: "Busola Latariusza" (no. 12)
2008	Fantazy the Bear	Name Stealer	Voice; episode: "Imieniny Fantazego" (no. 13)
2013	Hotel 52	Party attendant	Episode no. 91
2015	Father Matthew	Zygmunt Jakiewicz	Episode: "Rave party" (no. 185)
2016	Bodo	Pianist	Episode no. 6
2023	Kitty Kotty	Robber	Voice; episode: "Kitty Kotty Becomes a Policewoman" (no. 2)
2023	Kitty Kotty	Microwave voice	Voice; episode: "Kitty Kotty in Space" (no. 5)
