= The Painted Man =

2008 fantasy novel by Peter V. Brett

- UK edition of The Painted Man
- Author: Peter V. Brett
- Cover artist: Larry Rostant
- Language: English
- Series: The Demon Cycle
- Genre: Fantasy, Horror
- Publisher: HarperCollins Publishers (UK); Del Rey Books (US)
- Publication place: United Kingdom, United States
- Media type: Print (hardback)
- Pages: 544
- ISBN: 978-0-00-727613-4
- Followed by: The Desert Spear

The Painted Man (titled The Warded Man in the US) is a fantasy novel written by American writer Peter V. Brett. It is the first part of the Demon Cycle. It was first published by HarperCollins's Voyager imprint in the United Kingdom on 1 September 2008, and was published in the United States under the title of The Warded Man in March 2009. It has been translated into German, Japanese, Polish, Czech, French, Spanish, Dutch, Portuguese, Serbian, Estonian and Turkish. There is also a Graphic Audio production of the book.

== Summary ==
The novel follows three POV characters in their passage from childhood to maturity. They are inhabitants of a world plagued by the attacks of demons known as Corelings, which rise from the planet's core each night to feast upon humans. There are many different kinds of corelings, each associated with a particular element and each with different capabilities and strengths.

The ongoing attrition of these attacks have reduced humanity from an advanced state of technology to a dark age. The only defense against the corelings are wards (magical runes) that can be drawn, painted, or inscribed to form protective barriers around human settlements. These are, however, fragile and prone to failure unless properly maintained.

As the novel progresses, the protagonists each embark upon his or her own hero's journey in an effort to save humanity.

In writing the tale, Brett was keen to move beyond a simple adventure story, to present a fantasy novel about fear and its impact. He was particularly interested in the effect of fear "causing some to freeze up and others to leap into action."

== Major characters ==
=== Arlen ===
Arlen is introduced in the aftermath of a coreling attack that claims 27 lives. Those happen often, usually due to marred or misplaced wards. He realizes that humans have been mostly on the defensive, hiding behind wards. During an attack which endangers his family he overcomes his fears of the corelings and attempts to fight them off, though with little success. He is disgusted by his father's cowardice after his mother is attacked, and leaves his home to seek training as a messenger, a traveling warrior-nomad responsible for maintaining trade and communication links between villages. As he matures he becomes determined to hone his skills and help turn the tide against the corelings. In the second half of the story, Arlen discovers the lost combat wards inscribed in the ruins of Anoch Sun. Betrayed by the men of Krasia, he uses the wards on himself, becoming "The Painted Man".

=== Leesha ===
Leesha is a thirteen-year-old girl who lives with her abusive mother and downtrodden father. After a slanderous rumor spread by her fiancé seems to destroy her chances of a respectable marriage and shows the true nature of many of her friends and the hypocrisy of the villagers, she devotes herself to learning the ways of herb gathering to care for the sick.

=== Rojer ===
Rojer enters the narrative as a toddler, the only member of his family to survive a coreling attack. He is rescued and adopted by an alcoholic jongleur, a type of roaming jester that frequently travels with messengers and performs in villages on the messenger's route. Rojer has a crippled hand, caused by the loss of two fingers in the coreling attack that killed his parents. This limits his ability to juggle but does not hinder him in the least when he plays his favorite instrument, the fiddle. He later remembers that the jongleur that adopted him actually caused the death of his mother, he confronts him on the road about this later, and the jongleur, in a fit of drunken rage, pushes him into the corelings. He then sees his mistake, and dies in order to save Rojer's life. With his fiddle Rojer can entrance the corelings with his music causing the corelings to follow him, anger them to rage, make them oblivious to others, or drive them away with jarring music. Rojer tries without success to teach others his skills with the fiddle. Rojer harbors strong unrequited feelings for Leesha.

== Reception ==
The novel was selected by Amazon.co.uk as one of the Top 10 Science Fiction & Fantasy books of 2008. and has been nominated for the first David Gemmell Awards for Fantasy.

== Sequels ==
The second volume of the Demon Cycle, The Desert Spear, was released in April 2010, published by Del Rey Books in the US and Canada, and Voyager in the UK. The third volume, entitled The Daylight War, was released 12 February 2013 by Del Rey in the United States. The fourth volume, entitled The Skull Throne, was released 31 March 2015 by Del Rey in the United States. The fifth and final volume, The Core, was released on 3 October 2017 in the United States. There are also three novellas related to the story. "The Great Bazaar", "Brayan's Gold" and "Messenger's Legacy", each released in limited edition by Subterranean Press. Peter V. Brett has stated that he has one more book left in his publishing contract, which will be set in the same world as the Demon Cycle and may grow into a new series.

== Film adaptation ==
It has been confirmed that the Demon Cycle has been optioned for film production by director Paul W. S. Anderson and longtime producing partner Jeremy Bolt, the duo behind the Resident Evil film franchise. A 2016 update at Peter V. Brett's webpage stated that Anderson and Bolt are no longer involved in the film production.
