= The Desert Spear =

2010 fantasy novel by Peter V. Brett

- Author: Peter V. Brett
- Cover artist: Larry Rostant
- Language: English
- Series: The Demon Cycle
- Genre: Fantasy, Horror
- Publisher: HarperCollins (UK); Del Rey Books (US)
- Publication date: April 13, 2010
- Publication place: United Kingdom
- Media type: Print (hardback)
- Pages: 608
- ISBN: 0-345-50381-3
- Preceded by: The Painted Man
- Followed by: The Daylight War

The Desert Spear is a fantasy novel written by American writer Peter V. Brett. It is the second book in the Demon Cycle series. It was released on April 13, 2010.

== Reception ==
The novel entered at no. 35 in the New York Times Hardcover Fiction Best Seller List in April 2010. It has ranked in the top 15 of The Times Hardback Fiction Bestseller List since its release in April.

== Sequels ==
The third volume, entitled The Daylight War, was released February 12, 2013. Following the events of The Desert Spear, the books main characters must fight against an army of demons. According to Brett, The Daylight War precedes two more planned novels (in addition to novellas) in the series, making it a quintet.

== Film adaptation ==
It has been confirmed that the Demon Cycle has been optioned for film production by the major Hollywood director Paul W. S. Anderson and longtime producing partner Jeremy Bolt, the duo behind the Resident Evil film franchise.
