= Jerzy Dominik =

Polish speed skater

Personal information
- Nationality: Polish
- Born: 5 December 1964 (age 60); Zakopane, Poland

Sport
- Sport: Speed skating

Jerzy Dominik (born 5 December 1964) is a Polish speed skater. He competed in three events at the 1988 Winter Olympics.
