= Justyna Bojczuk =

Polish actress

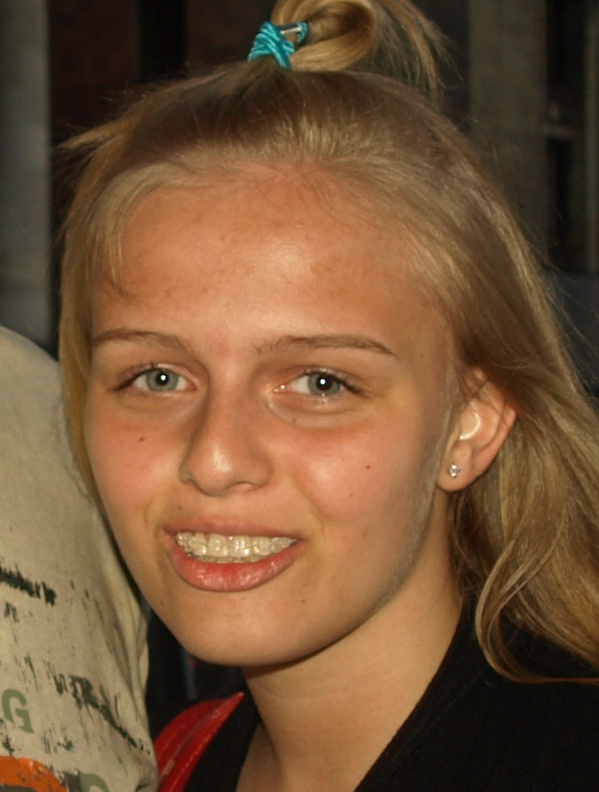
- Born: 21 August 1995 (age 30); Warsaw, Poland
- Occupation: Actress

Justyna Bojczuk (born 21 August 1995) is a Polish actress. She contributes to voicing characters in cartoons, anime, movies, sitcoms, and videogames.

== Career ==
Bojczuk is well known for providing the voice of Darby in the Polish language dub of the animated series My Friends Tigger & Pooh, Isabella Garcia-Shapiro in the Polish language dub of the animated series Phineas and Ferb. She also provides the voice of the character Iris in the Polish language dub of the anime series Pokémon.

Bojczuk works at SDI Media Polska, Start International Polska, and other dubbing studios in Poland.

== Filmography ==
=== Television ===
- Beatka in Do dzwonka
- Alicja Kramer in Warsaw Pact
- Żaneta Mikiciuk in Barwy Szczęścia
- Matilda in Violetta

== Voice work ==
=== Anime and animation ===
- Isabella Garcia-Shapiro in Phineas and Ferb
- Isabella Garcia-Shapiro/Isabella-2 in Phineas and Ferb the Movie: Across the 2nd Dimension
- Iris and Leona in Pokémon
- Iris in Pokémon the Movie: Black—Victini and Reshiram and White—Victini and Zekrom
- Sweetie Belle in My Little Pony: Friendship Is Magic (MiniMini edition)
- Flo in Puppy in My Pocket: Adventures in Pocketville
- Toph in Avatar: The Last Airbender
- Wadi (First voice) in The Secret Saturdays
- Shelly in Sammy's Adventures: The Secret Passage
- Zoe in Animalia
- Penny in Despicable Me
- Darby in My Friends Tigger & Pooh
- Linny the Guinea Pig in Wonder Pets
- Zephie in Chuggington
- Ivy in The Wish That Changed Christmas
- Rosie and Bridget Hatt in Thomas and Friends
- Raa Raa the Noisy Lion
- Priscilla in Rango
- Sheena in Hey Arnold! (Nickelodeon edition)
- Sam McCloud (voice) in Stoked
- Impy in Impy's Island
- Ben and Holly’s Little Kingdom
- Peaches in Ice Age: A Mammoth Christmas
- Pepper Potts (season 2) in Iron Man: Armored Adventures

=== Live-action shows and films ===
- Carly Shay in iCarly
- Zora Lancaster and Dakota in Sonny with a Chance
- Zora Lancaster in So Random!
- Talia, Lisa Cucuy, Tina, and Jackie Evancho in Wizards of Waverly Place
- Katara in The Last Airbender
- Max and Holly O'Neil in The Suite Life of Zack & Cody
- Megan Parker in Drake & Josh
- Nim Rusoe in Nim's Island
- Mei Ying in The Karate Kid (2010 film)
- Emily in Johnny Tsunami
- Nikki Fletcher in Ice Princess
- Ginger Falcone (Second voice) in Zeke and Luther
- Rosebud in Space Buddies
- Will in The Search for Santa Paws
- Olive Doyle in A.N.T. Farm
- Sadie Jenkins in Sadie J
- Cat Valentine in Victorious and Sam & Cat

=== Video games ===
- Amata Almodovar in Fallout 3
- Pandora in God of War III
