= Anna Sroka =

Polish political scientist

Anna Sroka Ph.D.
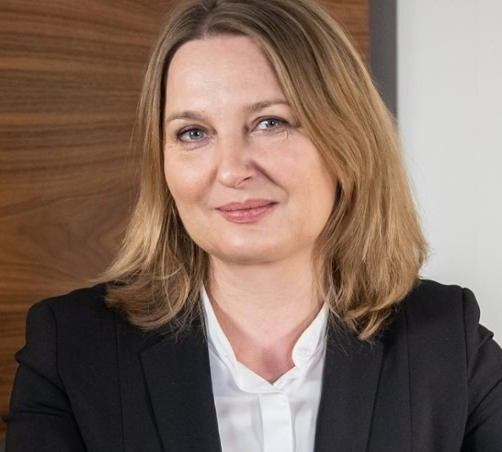

Poland Ambassador to Spain
- In office 7 June 2022 – July 2024
- Preceded by: Marzenna Adamczyk
- Succeeded by: Anna Krzepkowska

Personal details
- Education: University of Wrocław
- Profession: Political scientist, academic

Anna Marta Sroka is a Polish political scientist, who serves as Poland Ambassador to Spain (2022–2024).

== Life ==
Anna Sroka has graduated from Political Science at the University of Wrocław (2001). She studied also in Berlin (1999–2000; 2002–2003) and on the Autonomous University of Madrid. In 2006, she defended a Ph.D. thesis on the model of autonomy in Spain. In 2015, she received habilitation degree at the University of Warsaw. She specializes on quality of democracy.

She was working as a lecturer at the Nebrija University, Madrid (2006–2008), and the National University of Distance Education, Madrid. Following her studies, she taught Spanish history and language at the university. In 2008, she became assistant professor at the Department of European Institutions, Institute of Political Science, University of Warsaw. In 2019, she joined the Department of Internal Security, Faculty of Political Science and International Studies, University of Warsaw. She has been member of the Executive Committee of the European Consortium for Political Research and head of the Polish-Spanish Net of Scientific Research.

On 5 April 2022, she was nominated ambassador to Spain, accredited also to Andorra. She started her term on 7 June 2022. She ended her mission in July 2024.

Besides Polish, she speaks the English, Spanish, and German languages.
