= Klaudiusz Kaufmann =

Polish actor (born 1978)

Klaudiusz Kaufmann (born 8 April 1978 in Gliwice) is a Polish-German film, stage and dubbing actor. He has appeared since 2015 as Wiktor Krol in the famous German series Polizeiruf 110.

== Selected filmography ==
- Pfarrer Braun - Kur mit Schatten
- Großstadtrevier - Freifahrt
- Polizeiruf 110: Feindbild
- Spies of Warsaw
- The Passing Bells
- Polizeiruf 110: "Grenzgänger"
- Polizeiruf 110: "Der Preis der Freiheit"
- Hochzeitspolka (2010)
- The Zone of Interest (film)
- Joanna
- Hans Kloss. Stawka większa niż śmierć
