= Tomasz Marzecki =

Tadeusz Tomasz Marzecki
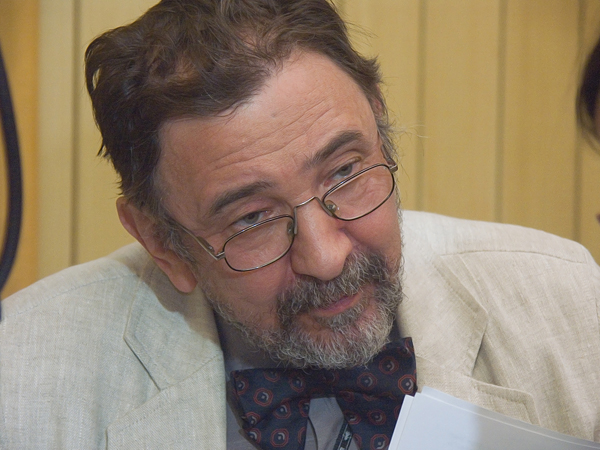
- Born: 16 April 1949 (age 77)
- Education: The Aleksander Zelwerowicz National Academy of Dramatic Art in Warsaw
- Occupation: Voice actor
- Awards: Cross of Merit (Poland)

Tadeusz Tomasz Marzecki (born 16 April 1949) is a Polish voiceover provider, narrator and dubbing director who rarely appears in person on TV or in film.

== Biography ==
In 1972 he graduated from the Aleksander Zelwerowicz National Academy of Dramatic Art in Warsaw.

For many years he has been associated with Polish Radio, and has participated in dozens of radio dramas. His most well-known role is in Matysiakowie as Tom Piekarski (1985–present). He is also known for providing the voice for Xardas in the Gothic video game series.

He provided the voice of the Air Conditioner in the Polish dub of The Brave Little Toaster.

His voice can be heard on TVP1's "Ktokolwiek widział, ktokolwiek wie", as well as for various other occasions (e.g. national holidays) broadcast on the same channel - a state owned network.

During the funeral of President Lech Kaczynski and his wife Maria on 18 April 2010, broadcast by TVP, he read fragments of Juliusz Słowacki's poetry.

In the fictionalized film about General Tadeusz Rozwadowski "The Forgotten General" - Zapomniany generał (2012) he played the lead character.

He was awarded the Gold Cross of Merit in 2001.

== Bibliography ==
- Tomasz Marzecki at IMDb
- Tomasz Marzecki on filmweb.pl (pol.)
- Tomasz Marzecki on filmpolski.pl (pol.)
