= Leszek Zduń =

Polish actor

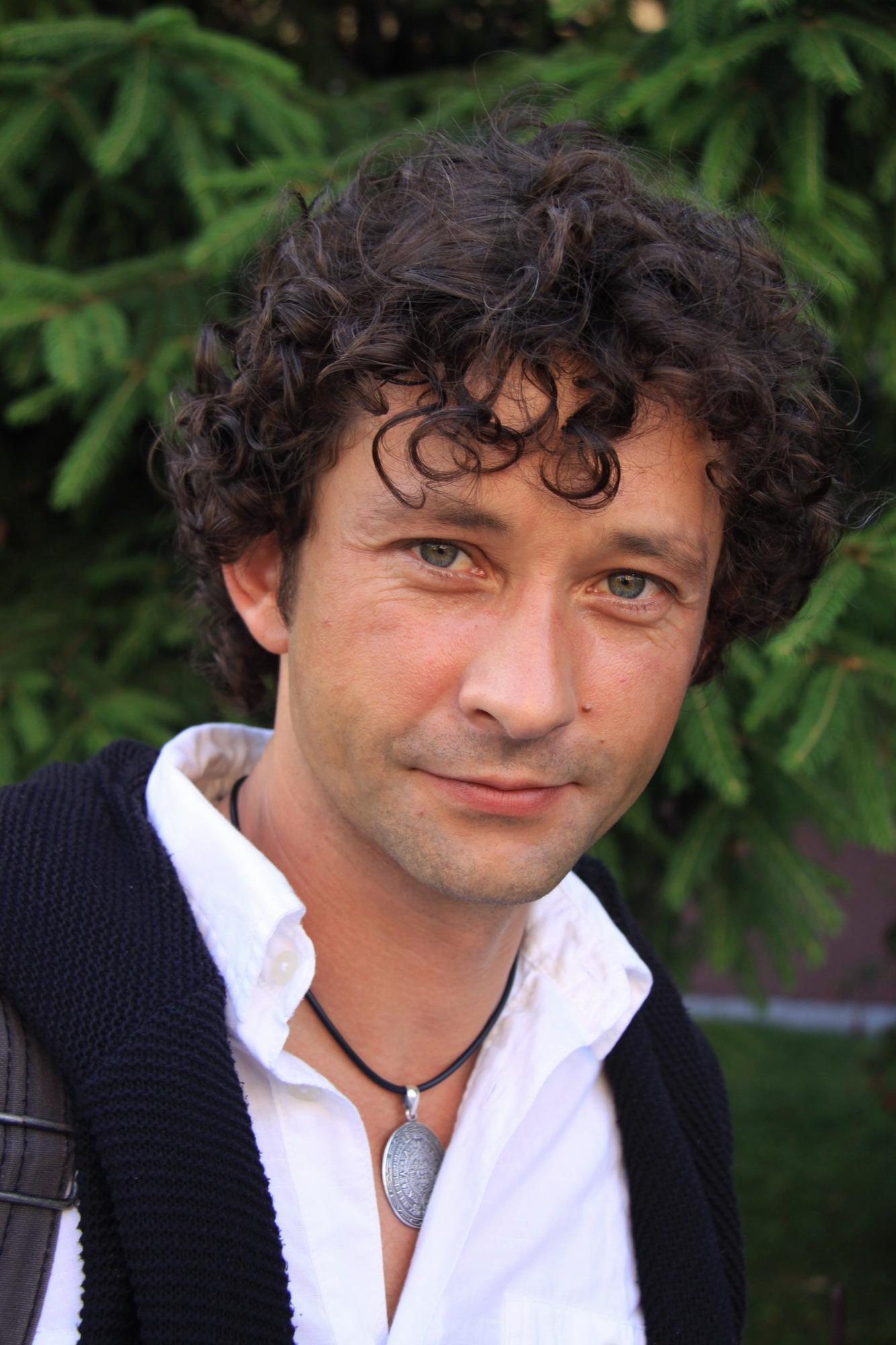
- Leszek Zduń in 2010.
- Born: 1972 (age 53–54); Myślenice, Poland
- Education: National Academy of Theatre Arts
- Occupation: Actor
- Years active: 1993–present
- Spouse: Joanna Kwiatkowska-Zduń
- Children: 3

Leszek Zduń (Polish: [ˈlɛ.ʂɛk ˈzduɲ]; born 1972) is a Polish film, television, stage, and voice actor.

== Biography ==
Leszek Zduń was born in 1972 in Myślenice, Poland.

He debuted on stage in 1993. In 1995, he graduated from the National Academy of Theatre Arts in Kraków, Poland. In 1994, he was a member of the Juliusz Słowacki Theatre, in 1993, and from 1995 to 1997, he was a member of the Helena Modrzejewska National Old Theater in Kraków, from 1997 to 2009, of the National Theatre in Warsaw. He also played in Polonia Theater, and Och-Teatr in Warsaw.

== Personal life ==
He is married to actress Joanna Kwiatkowska-Zduń, with whom he has three children: two daughters and a son.

== Filmography ==
=== Films ===
Year	Title	Role	Notes	Ref.
1994	Reverted	Miner		
1994	Śmierć jak kromka chleba	Miner		
1995	Spis cudzołożnic	Student		
1995	Biały Łabędz	Young prince	Television play	
1996	Urodziny	Marcel	Television play	
1996	Markiz von Keith	Herman Casimir	Television play	
1996	Nieposłuszna mama		Television play	
1996	Mąż stanu	Michał Claverton-Ferry	Television play	
1997	Dzień wielkiej ryby	Emil		
1998	Skarb ze snu	Jakub	Television play	
1999	Niedobra miłość	Julek	Television play	
1999	...powinniście być wdzięczni Stalinowi	Narrator	Voice; documentary film	
2000	Operacja "Koza"	Man		
2000	Noc świętego Mikołaja	Jędruś Groniec		
2003	Biała sukienka	Jędruś Groniec		
2004	Nigdy w życiu!	Goral		
2006	Son of Stars	Boy	Voice; short film	
2006	Son of Stars	Raven	Voice; short film	
2007	Cud mniemany, czyli Krakowiacy i Górale	Mergal	Television play	
2007	Kongola	Waldek	Short film	
2011	Wojna żeńsko-męska	Michał		
2014	Obywatel	Friend from a creamery		
2014	Gods	Physician		
2015	Anatomia zła	Journalist		
2015	Malucholandia. Co w ciele piszczy?	Father	Voice; short film	
2017	Tato		Short film	
2017	Brat naszego Boga	Lucjan	Television play	
2018	Landszaft	Film director	Short film	
2019	Hiranmoy Ghoshal. Nurtem dwóch rzek		Documentary film	
2020	Jan Szczepanik. Artysta wynalazku		Documentary film	
2020	W czeluściach Gusen	Narrator	Voice; documentary film	
2020	W odmętach Ravensbrück	Prisoner	Voice; documentary film	
2020	Hetman	Tomasz Zamoyski	Voice; short film	
2023	Kultura. Giedroyc i inni...		Documentary film	
2023	Powrót posła	Chamberlain	Television play	

=== Television series ===
Year	Title	Role	Notes	Ref.
1996–1997	Bar Atlantic	Józek	3 episodes	
1997	Sława i chwała	Władzio Sobański	Episode: "Wojenka" (no. 3)	
1998	Z pianką czy bez	Sylwek Andrzejewski	3 episodes	
1998	Siedlisko	Józek	Episode no. 1	
2001	Miodowe lata	Painter	Episode: "Remont" (no. 90)	
2001	Kocham Klarę	Assistant director	Episode: "Gwiazda reklamy" (no. 6)	
2001	Garderoba damska	Stylist	Episode: "Nagłe zastępstwo" (no. 10)	
2002	Kasia i Tomek	Goral in the passport office	Voive; episode no. 26	
2002	Baśnie i bajki polskie	Lutek	Voice; episode: "Złota kaczka" (no. 2)	
2003	Baśnie i bajki polskie	Bartek	Voice; episode: "O Bartku doktorze" (no. 4)	
2003	Baśnie i bajki polskie	Jan	Voice; episode: "Żywa woda" (no. 6)	
2004	Baśnie i bajki polskie	Smykałka	Voice; episode: "Smok Wawelski" (no. 10)	
2008	Baśnie i bajki polskie	Bolko	Voice; episode: "Król kruków" (no. 14)	
2008	Baśnie i bajki polskie	Staś	Voice; episode: "Korale czarownicy" (no. 15)	
2003	Zaginiona	Photographer	4 episodes	
2004–2005	Na dobre i na złe	Konrad, Julia's friend	5 episodes	
2004–2009	Foster Family	Kuba Potulicki	Main role (season 7–18); 106 episodes	
2006	Oficerowie	Artur Żmijewski	Episode: "Stinger" (no. 1)	
2006–2010	Złotopolscy	Franciszek Wysocki	Recurring role; 57 episodes	
2007	Crime Detectives	Mariusz Szajny	Episode: "Eksperyment" (no. 73)	
2007	Faceci do wzięcia	Man	Episode: "Nie wciskaj mi PIT-u" (no. 48)	
2009	Naznaczony	Physician	Episode: "Sprawy niedokończone" (no. 6)	
2010	Daleko od noszy	Momot	Episode: "Milion dolarów za Nobla" (no. 192)	
2010	Father Matthew	Radek Górski	Episode: "Talent" (no. 51)	
2013	Father Matthew	Marcin Bukowski	Episode: "Rezydencja" (no. 124)	
2020	Father Matthew	Rajmund Ciszek	Episode: "Ciało" (no. 294)	
2011	Unia serc	IT specialist	Episode no. 11	
2013	Medics	Neurologist	Episode: "Zaplątani" (no. 31)	
2013	Na krawędzi	Police technician	6 episodes	
2014	Na krawędzi 2	Former police technician	2 episodes	
2014	Na sygnale	Olaf	Voice; episode no. 15	
2014	Komisarz Alex	Olaf Kaczmarek	Episode: "Gra pozorów" (no. 60)	
2017	Komisarz Alex	Patryk	Episode: "Opętanie" (no. 116)	
2017	Komisarz Alex	Jakub Jusiński	Episode: "Śmiertelne złoto" (no. 122)	
2015	O mnie się nie martw	Andrzej	Episode no. 29	
2017	First Love	Film director		
2017	Druga szansa	Police officer	Episode: "Pomóż mi" (no. 35)	
2017	Lekarze na start	Husband	2 episodes	
2018	W rytmie serca	Kamil Mirecki	Episode: "Rozstanie" (no. 19)	
2018–2019	Tales of Tappi the Viking	Eagle	Voice; episode: "Podstęp jarla Surkola" (no. 6)	
2018–2019	Tales of Tappi the Viking	Węchacz	Voice; episode: "Obrońcy wioski Dębinki" (no. 8)	
2018–2019	Tales of Tappi the Viking	Magnus	Voice; episode: "Obrońcy wioski Dębinki" (no. 8)	
2019	The Crown of the Kings	Jan of Czarnków	22 episodes	
2022	Bunt!	Historian	5 episodes	
