= Jacek Kopczyński =

Polish actor

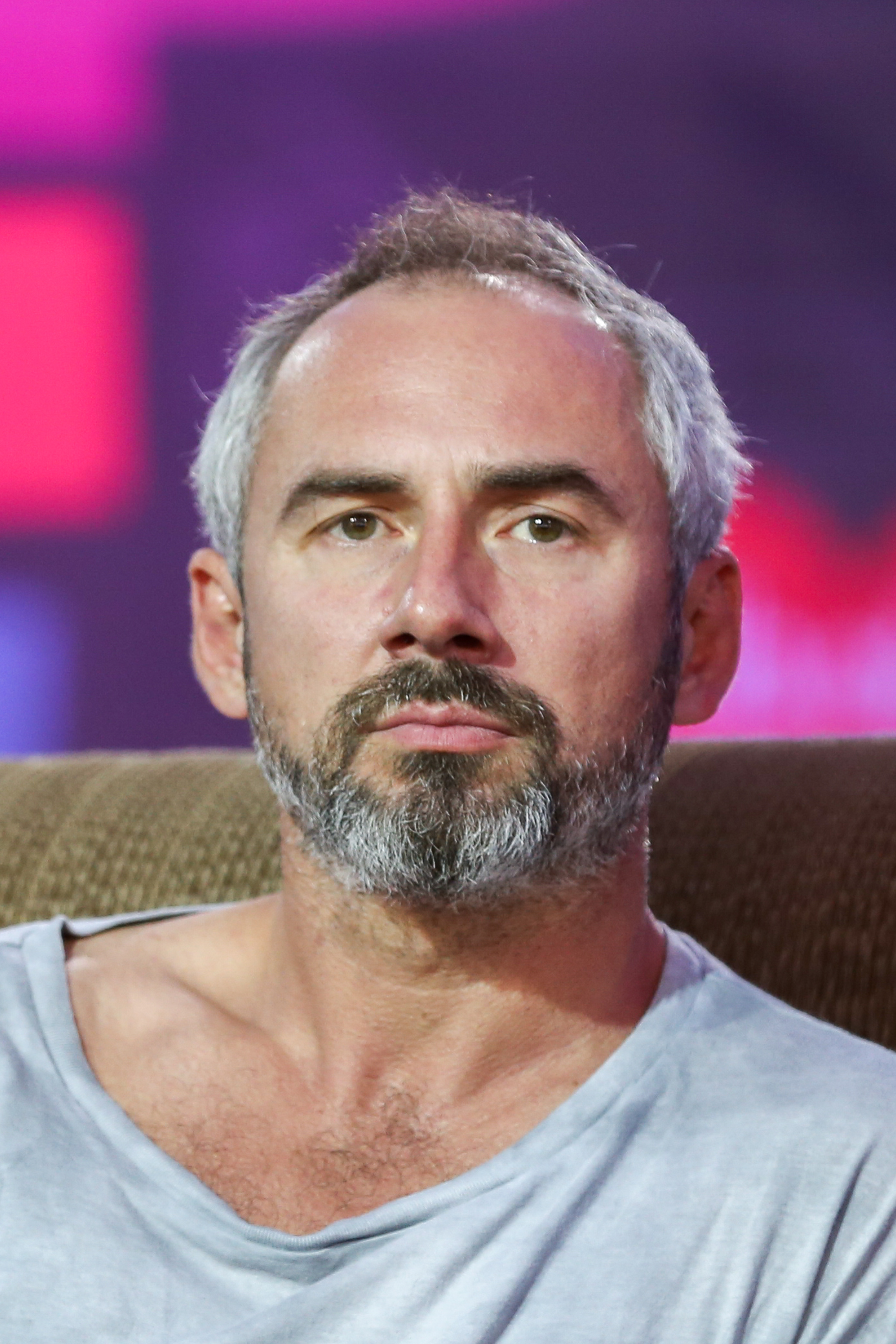
- Born: August 11, 1971 (age 55); Łódź, Poland
- Occupation: Actor
- Years active: 1992-present
- Spouse: Patrycja Markowska
- Children: 2

Jacek Kopczyński (born 11 August 1971) is a Polish actor. He also provides voice-overs on television programs, like those broadcast on Hyper+. He is most known as the official Polish voice actor of Fred Jones in Scooby-Doo and the original voice of Dandelion (Jaskier) in The Witcher video games.

== Biography ==
In 1994 he graduated from the Acting Department at the Polish National Film, Television and Theatre School in Łódź. From 1994 to 1999 he worked at the Dramatic Theatre in Warsaw, and is currently not connected permanently to any theater.

In May 2025, he instigated a brawl with parliamentarians in the Sejm, following a controversy over former minister Ziobro.

He is married to Patrycja Markowska, with whom he has a son (born 9 January 2008).
