= Disney Character Voices International =

Corporate division of The Walt Disney Company

Disney Character Voices International, Inc.

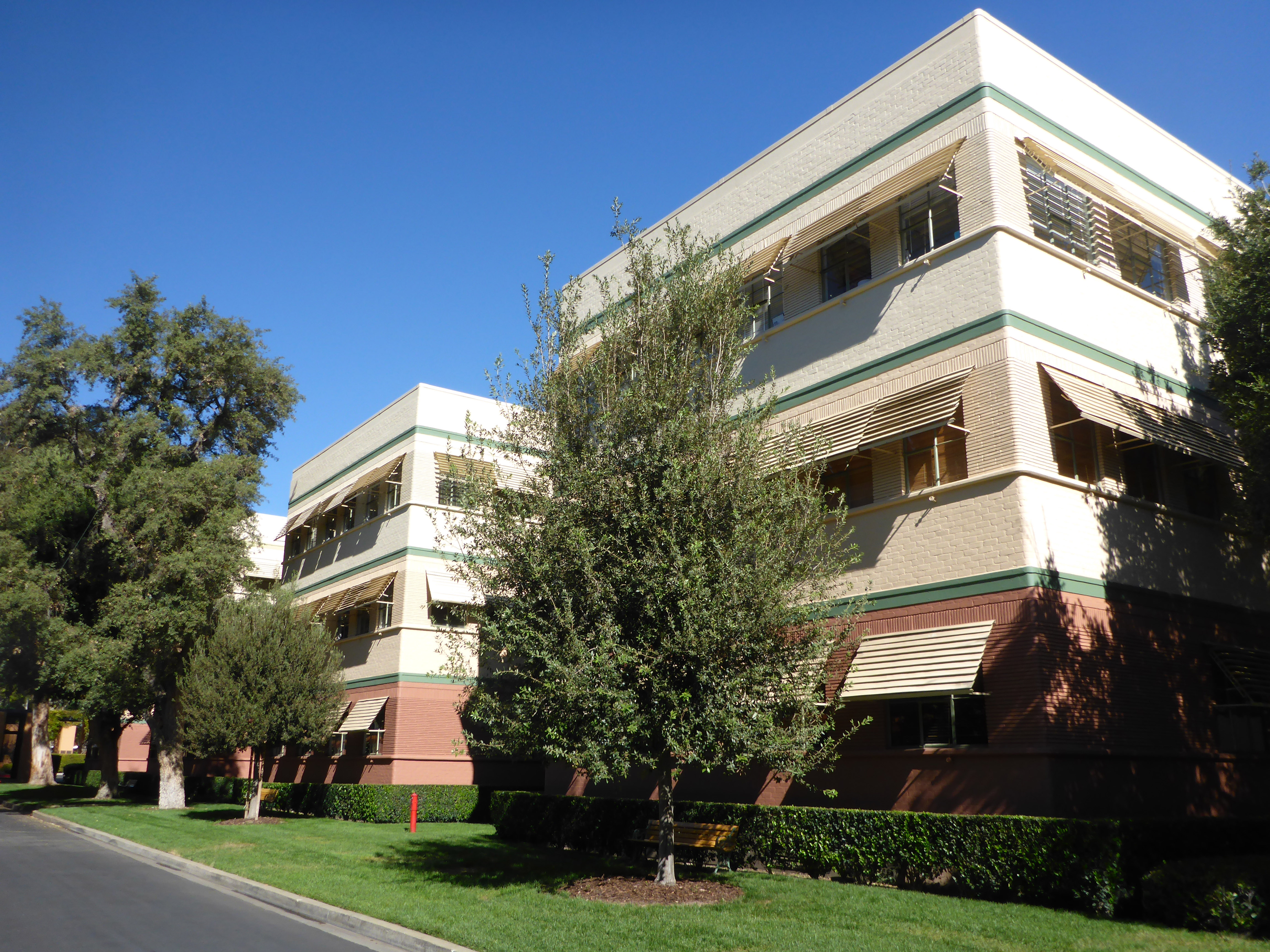
- Headquarters of DCVI at the old Animation Building at the Walt Disney Studios in Burbank, California
- Type: Subsidiary
- Founded: 1988; 38 years ago
- Founder: Michael Eisner
- Headquarters: Burbank, California, United States
- Owner: The Walt Disney Company

Disney Character Voices International, Inc. is a subsidiary of The Walt Disney Company with primary responsibility for the provision of translation and dubbing services for all Disney productions including those by Walt Disney Studios Motion Pictures, Disney Music Group, and Disney Platform Distribution. This division also supervises dubbings for Disney theme parks and derived games. An office of the division is present in several countries around the world.

== History ==
The first dubbing issued for a Disney movie was Snow White and the Seven Dwarfs, which was originally distributed in 1938 in various Western languages. Walt Disney expressed to Tatiana Angelini, Swedish voice of Snow White, that she was his personal favorite international voice for the character. The movie premiered at the 6th Venice International Film Festival, winning the Grand Art Trophy special award. Disney was unable to secure distribution in Nazi Germany. To make a German-language version for Austria and Switzerland, Disney recorded native German voice talent in Amsterdam.

In the 1940s, Jimmy Johnson named Jack Cutting, Disney animator since 1930, responsible for the dubbing of Disney movies foreign languages. In 1948, Disney received a Special Achievement Award at the 5th Golden Globe Awards for succeeding in producing a Hindustani dubbing of Bambi right after the end of the Indian independence movement, for "furthering the (American) influence of the screen". While Bambi was the first movie to be dubbed in Hindustani, it is unknown whether more movies followed, or if the next dubbings produced by Disney India had to wait for Aladdin to be released in 1993 in Hindi, Tamil and Telugu. The DCVI affiliate branch itself was founded in 1988, when Michael Eisner decided to set up a dubbing department, directed by Roy Disney.

In July 2024, actor labor union Screen Actors Guild-American Federation of Television and Radio Artists (SAG-AFTRA), which also has numerous video game voice actors as members, would initiate a labor strike against a number of video publishers, including Disney Character Voices, over concerns about lack of A.I. protections concerning not only video game voice actors, but also the use of A.I to replicate an actor's voice, or create a digital replica of their likeness.

== Cast selection ==
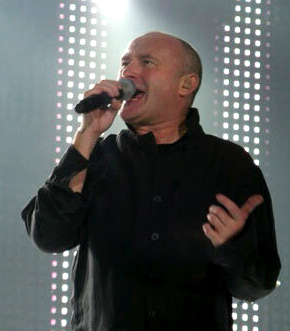
Phil Collins was selected to sing songs from the soundtrack of Tarzan also in French, German, Italian and Spanish for marketing reasons.

To keep the whole production under control, Disney established a centralized system to hold auditions from actors all over the world, for which the Walt Disney Company was awarded a 2017 Technology and Engineering Emmy Awards. Rick Dempsey, Senior Vice President of DCVI, said he specifically makes the casting decisions for countries that make the top 14 percent of the box office, which sets the blueprint of the character’s voice with the director of the particular language hub. Local offices placed in countries whose voices are directly selected by DCVI will have competence over a specific geographical area, and they will cast the rest of the region in comparison to the selected voices. According to Dempsey, the voices do not have to be identical to the original English voices, but they must match the character, letting them shine through. Especially since 2000s, local celebrities can sometimes be chosen for their appeal to their respective market more than their ability to match or accentuate the character, to make the movie more appealing to the local audience.

== Languages ==
Disney movies are usually released in theaters in a set of languages, which varies depending on the product. All Disney animated movies are systematically dubbed and distributed in a fixed group of languages. However, there are languages covered by the department on an irregular basis, which varies depending on the movie.

=== Dubbings systematically released ===
Over the years, the set of languages covered by DCVI has expanded, with a typical animated tentpole being nowadays distributed in theaters in 39 to 43 territories, an average live-action movie numbering 12 to 15 languages, and a four-quadrant live-action film like Pirates of the Caribbean being dubbed into about 27 tongues. The number of languages involved in the dubbing process varies in accordance with the kind of product, with animation movies covering the largest number, and it has expanded throughout the years.

Following the Russian invasion of Ukraine in 2022, Disney temporarily suspended all business in Russia, cancelling and removing the production of dubbings issued by The Walt Disney Company CIS, and shifting the location of the production of Russian theatrical film dubbings to Kazakhstan, though these official dubs have at times been imported into Russia via parallel imports. Meanwhile, Red Head Sound took upon the task of producing Russian dubs in Russia without Disney's permission with established Russian dub voice acting talent.

=== Dubbings irregularly or occasionally released ===
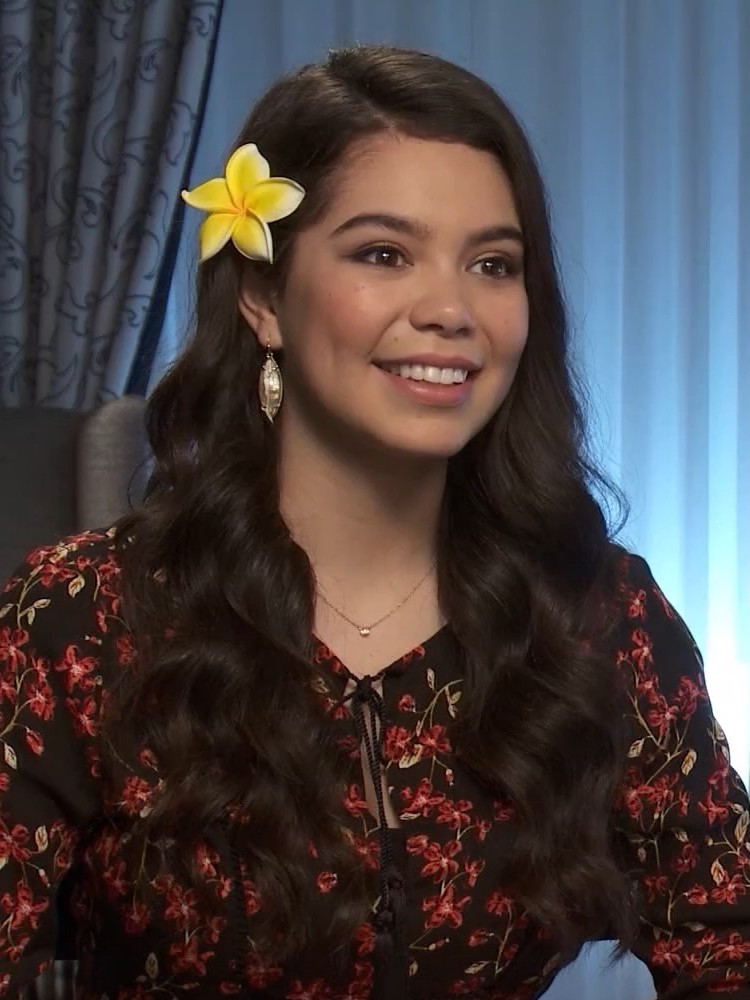
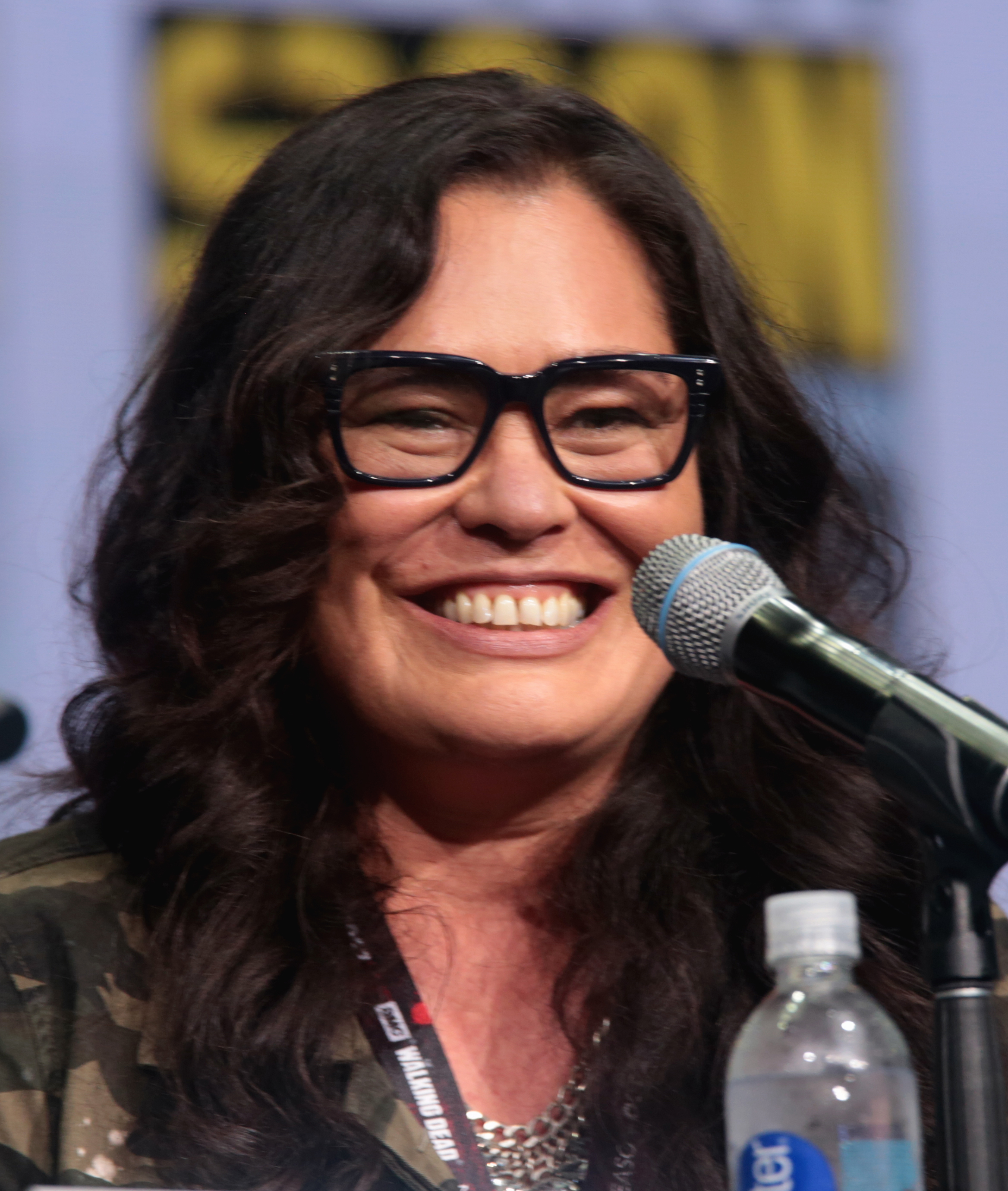
Auliʻi Cravalho and Rachel House reprised their roles in the movie Moana in the Hawaiian and Māori versions respectively.

Moana was released in 2016, which received a total of three special dubbings in Polynesian languages in the space of two years from its original release date. Following upon the success of these three productions, a special Northern Sámi dubbing was also made for the movie Frozen II, while no dubbing in this language was made for the first chapter of the series. A peculiar case in one-time dubbings are the Arapaho version of Bambi, released in 1994 and the Navajo version of Finding Nemo, released in 2016, made in collaboration with the Wyoming Indian Schools and the Navajo Nation Museum respectively. Differently from the rest of special dubbings, these two movies are not linked in any ways to the Arapaho and Navajo cultures, but they were rather chosen as a means to preserve these two languages, teaching them to young generations through a popular Disney movie. But while the Navajo version of Finding Nemo is a complete dubbing, which includes even a Navajo version of the end-credits song "Beyond the Sea" performed by Fall Out Boy's lead singer Patrick Stump, the Arapaho version of Bambi is only a partial dubbing, where the spoken parts were dubbed, but the songs were left in English.

Irregularly issued:

- Filipino
- Indonesian
- Kazakh
- Malay
- Tamil
- Telugu

Occasionally issued:

- Albanian
- Arabic (Saudi Arabia)
- Armenian
- Belarusian
- Bengali
- Galician
- German (Austria)
- Hindustani
- Kannada
- Malayalam
- Māori
- Marathi
- Persian
- Spanish (Argentina)
- Spanish (Mexico)

Special editions:

- Arapaho (Bambi)
- Hawaiian (Moana, Moana 2)
- Navajo (Finding Nemo)
- Sámi (Frozen II)
- Samoan (Moana 2)
- Tahitian (Moana, Moana 2)
- Zulu (The Lion King)
