= Dominika Kluźniak =

Polish actress

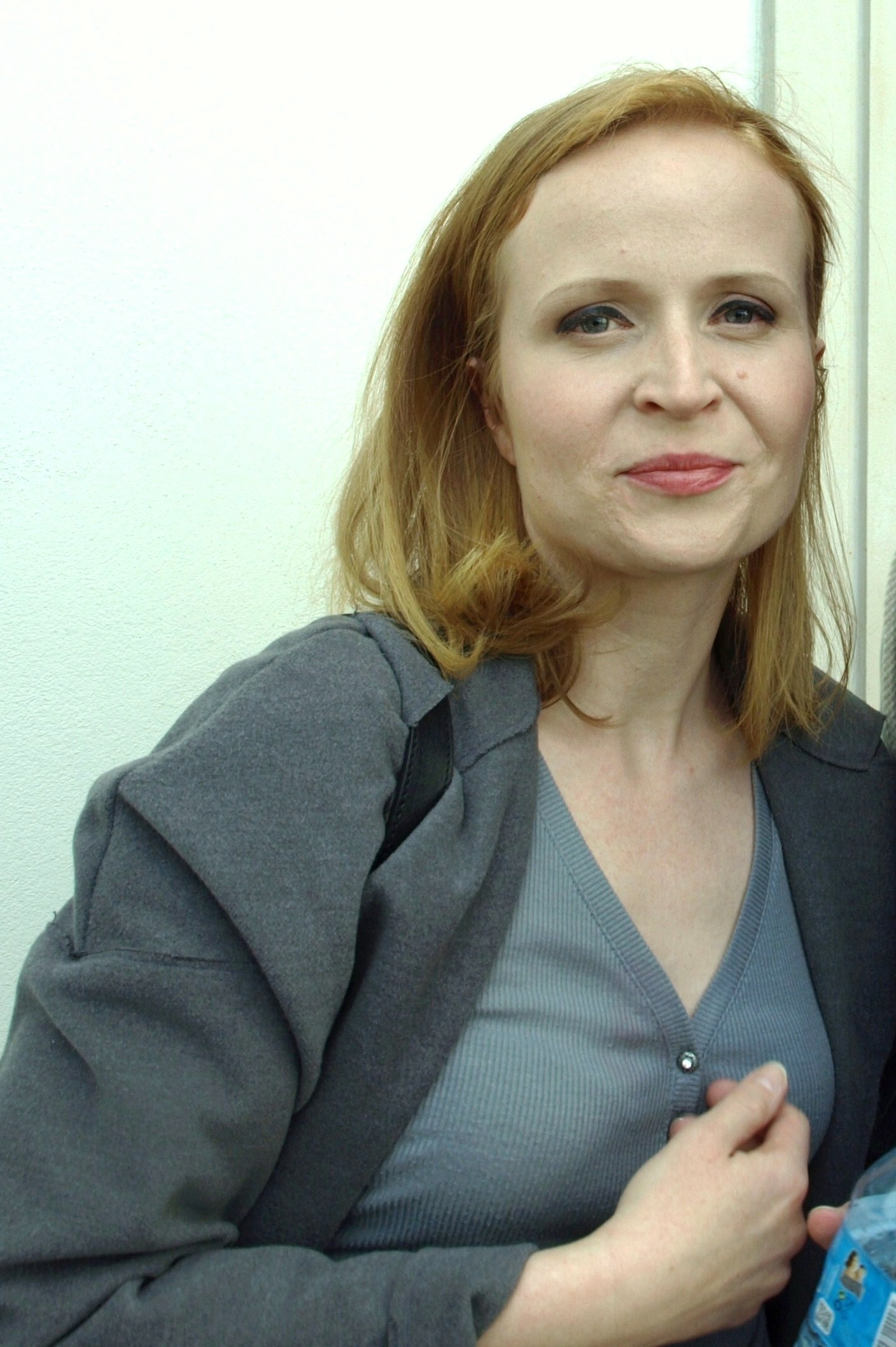
Dominika Kluźniak in 2015

Dominika Kluźniak (born July 10, 1980, in Wrocław, Poland) is a Polish theater, film and dubbing actress.

== Biography ==
Dominika Kluźniak was born July 10, 1980, in Wrocław, Poland. In 2003, she graduated from the Aleksander Zelwerowicz National Academy of Dramatic Art in Warsaw. Since then, she has been associated with the Dramatic Theater in Warsaw. In 2007, she played there in "Pippi Longstocking" (Pippi), for which she was awarded with the Warsaw Felix Award and the Award named after Aleksander Zelwerowicz for the 2007/2008 season. She awarded by the editors of the monthly "Teatr". Moreover, she was awarded with the Warsaw Felix Award for playing in "Obsługiwałem angielskiego króla" and "Sztuka bez tytułu". From the 2010/2011 season, she also plays on the stage of the National Theater in Warsaw.

Mother of two daughters.
