= Teletoon+ =

- Logo used since 2014
- Country: Poland
- Broadcast area: Nationwide

Programming
- Language: Polish
- Picture format: 16:9 1080i (HDTV); 16:9 576i (SDTV)

Ownership
- Parent: Canal+ (Polish TV provider)
- Sister channels: MiniMini+

History
- Launched: 16 April 1999
- Former names: Minimax (16 April 1999-16 October 2004); ZigZap (16 October 2004-1 October 2011)

Links
- Website: www.teletoonplus.pl

Teletoon+ (stylised as teleTOON+ or teleToON+ formerly Minimax and ZigZap) is a Polish television channel owned and operated by the French company Canal+ International through its Polish branch Canal+ Polska SA, available on Platforma Canal+. The channel targeted at children, carrying various animated films and television series.

== History ==
After the original Minimax channel was replaced by Fox Kids in Spain on 15 November 1998, the current Central European iteration of Minimax began on 16 April 1999

The channel was launched in Poland on Cyfra+. On 16 October 2004, the channel was renamed to ZigZap. However, Minimax continues to be broadcast in Hungary (since 6 December 1999), Romania, Moldova (since 1 June 2001), the Czech Republic, Slovakia (since 1 January 2004) and ex-Yugoslav countries (since 2007).

On 1 October 2011, when all Canal+ channels in Poland were relaunched to bear the „+” suffix in their names, ZigZap was renamed Teletoon+, taking the name from the similarly named channel in France. The French Télétoon was previously operated by Groupe TPS until 2007 when TPS merged with Canal+, and it took the new Télétoon+ name earlier in May 2011.

On 11 November 2011, the channel launched a high definition simulcast feed.

== Programming ==
=== Late night ===
From 1 August 1999 until 31 August 2001, Minimax aired a late night programming block titled Game One. It took the name from the French television channel of the same name which Canal+ operated until 2001. The station was localized French version with the same programming.

On 1 September 2001, the channel launched a new programming block titled Hyper, which carried the programmes about video gaming, and showed animated series from Japan. It was carried over well into the ZigZap era until 11 November 2011, when it was renamed Hyper+. The block ended on 1 July 2014.

Teletoon+ still broadcasts video game shows in the late night slot, but no particular branding is practised on such programmes.

=== Other ===
From 2000 to 2004, Minimax had two programming blocks. MiniKaruzela (karuzela means carousel in Polish) premiered on 24 December 2000 and MaxiStrefa (strefa means zone) premiered in January 2002. MiniKaruzela was intended for preschool and early school age children, while MaxiStrefa was intended for older viewers over 12 years of age. MiniKaruzela ended on 10 April 2004, after MiniMini (known since 2011 as MiniMini+) was launched on 20 December 2003. All the programmes from the block were moved to that channel. However, MaxiStrefa continued to air until 16 October 2004 when Minimax was replaced by ZigZap.

== Logos ==
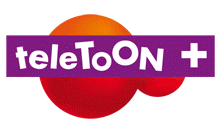
2011–2014

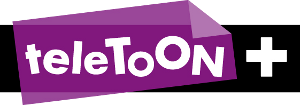
2011-2014

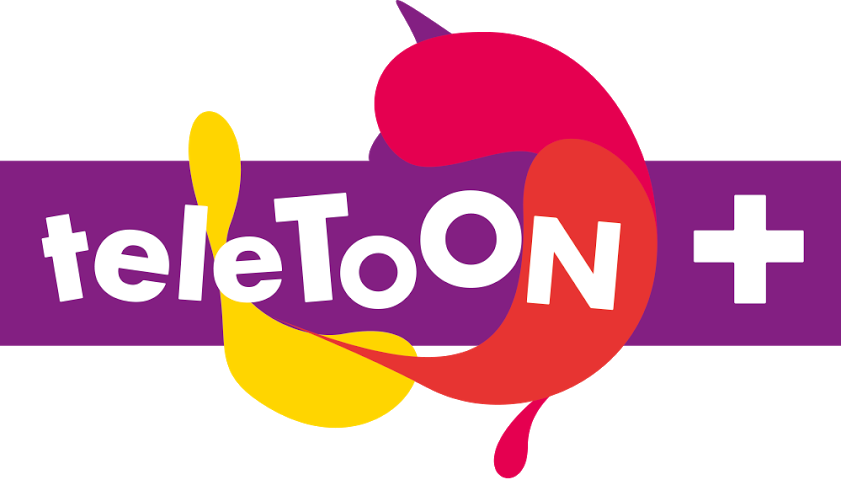
2014-present
