= Polish speculative fiction =

Aspect of fiction

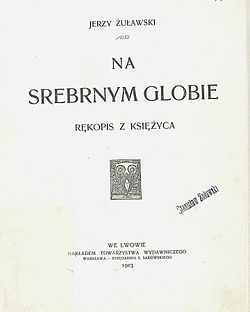
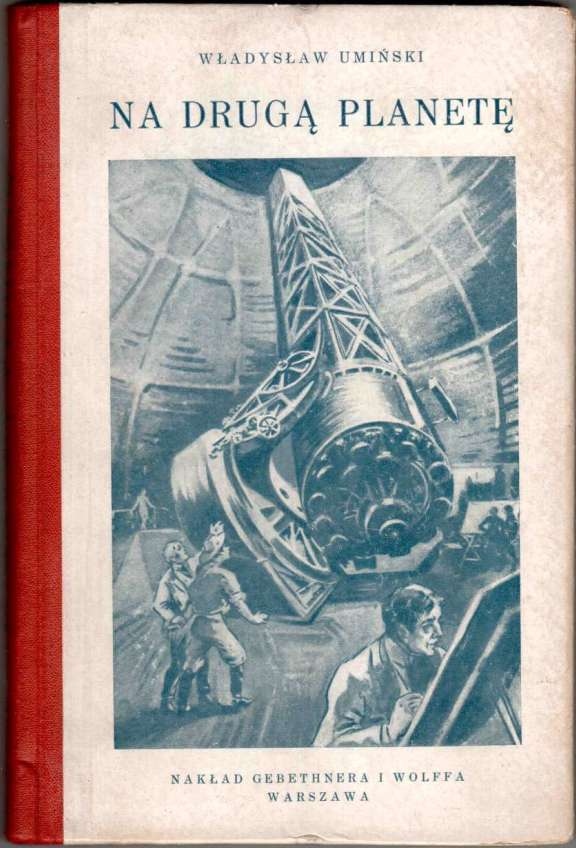
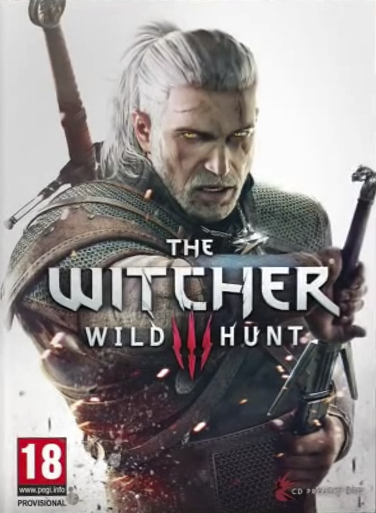
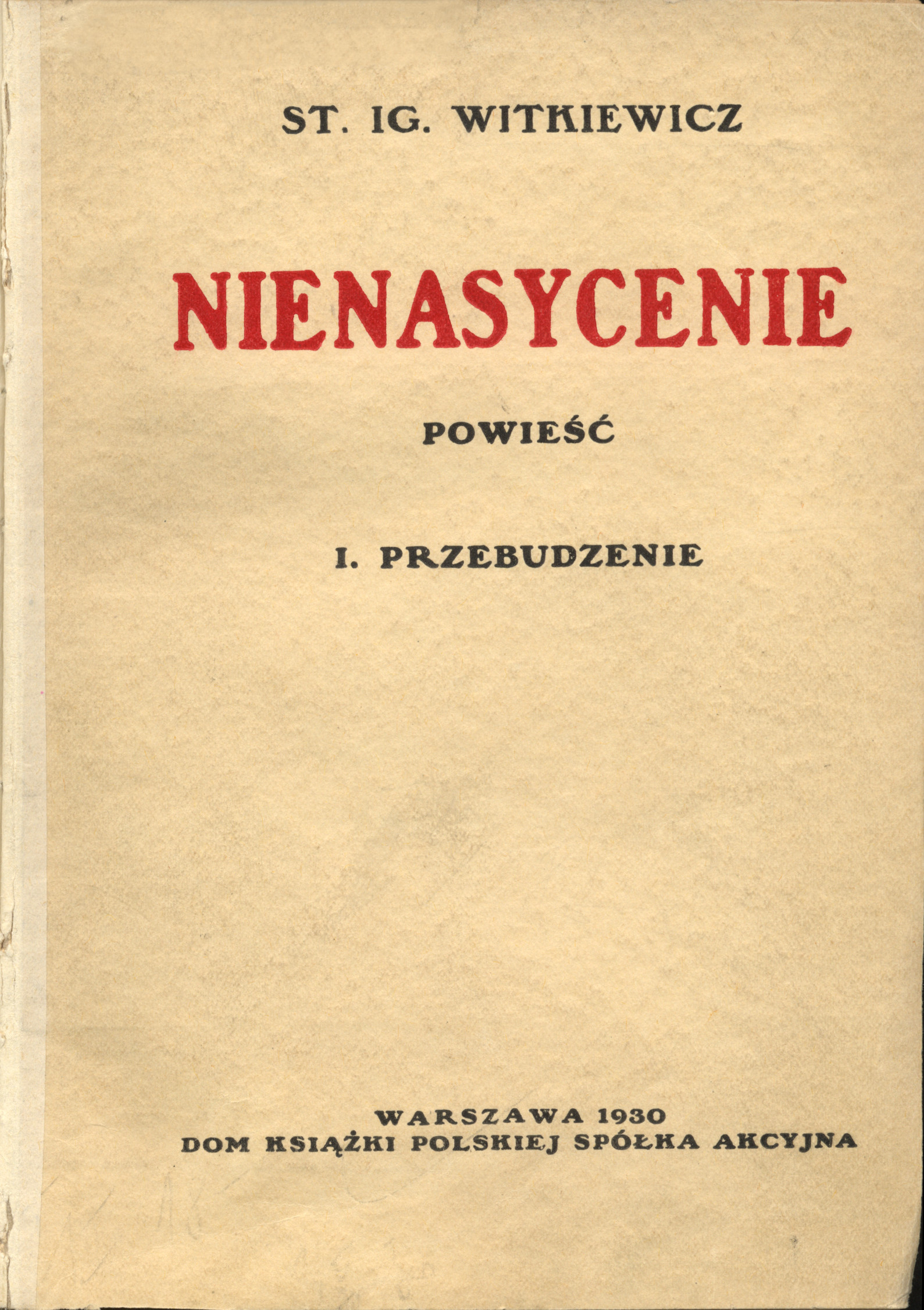
Notable examples of Polish speculative fiction, clockwise from top left: On the Silver Globe (1903), Na drugą planetę (1929), Insatiability (1930), and The Witcher 3: Wild Hunt (2015)

Polish speculative fiction dates to the late 18th century. However, science fiction as a genre in Polish literature truly began to emerge at the end of the 19th century under the influence of Jules Verne's work. During the latter years of the People's Republic of Poland, a very popular genre of science fiction was social science fiction. Later many other genres gained prominence.

Poland has many science-fiction writers. Internationally, the best-known Polish science-fiction writer is Stanisław Lem. The term science fiction was first used in a review of one of Lem's books, and he is widely regarded as the most prominent representative of Polish science fiction literature. As elsewhere, Polish science fiction is closely related to the genres of fantasy, horror and others. In the 1970s, the first fandom organizations appeared in Poland, along with the publication of the earliest zines. While many English-language writers have been translated into Polish, relatively little Polish-language science fiction or fantasy has been translated into English. Several science fiction, fantasy, and horror films and games have been made in Poland.

In the 21st century, Polish fantasy and science fiction works have gained international popularity. The Witcher franchise of fantasy literature by Andrzej Sapkowski has gained global popularity and received multiple adaptations, and the Polish video game studio CD Projekt has gained global recognition and positive reception for its Witcher video games and Cyberpunk 2077.

== History ==
=== Until 1918 ===
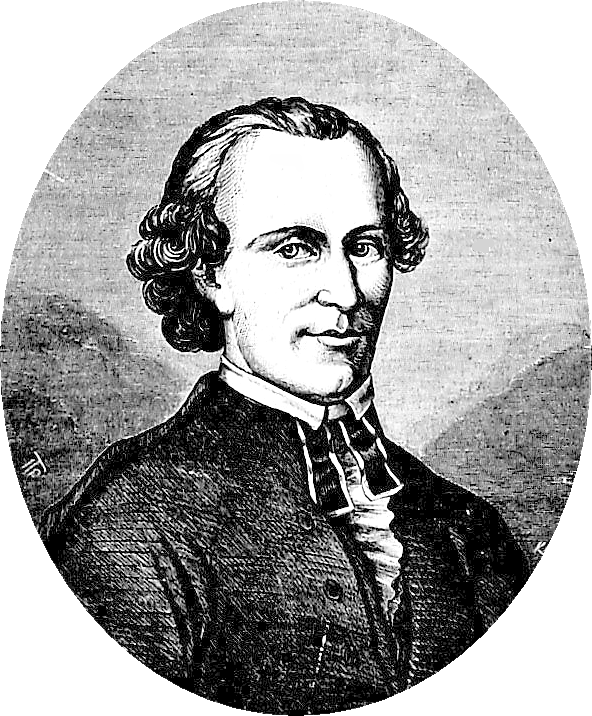
Michał Dymitr Krajewski – author of the first description of a journey to the Moon in Polish literature

Polish science fiction grew out of utopian literature, and it started in the late 18th century during the Polish Enlightenment, when Michał Dymitr Krajewski wrote a novel about the adventures of a Pole on the Moon. His work, Wojciech Zdarzyński, życie i przypadki swoje opisujący (Wojciech Zdarzyński, Describing His Life and Adventures), was the first Polish literary work to describe a journey to the Moon, using a balloon as the means of travel to lend credibility to the narrative. Descriptions of flying machines, rapid-fire weapons, and future medicine can be found in Podróż do Kalopei, do kraju najszczęśliwszego na świecie (Journey to Kalopea, the Country of the Happiest People in the World) by Wojciech Gutkowski from 1817. In Polish Enlightenment literature, fantastical elements were typically debunked by the end of the work, as seen in The Manuscript Found in Saragossa by Jan Potocki, where the appearance of ghosts serves as a satire of superstitions by the rational author.

In the mid-19th century, during the age of romanticism in Poland, Adam Mickiewicz, regarded by many as Poland's greatest poet, also worked on a Verne-like science fiction novel A History of the Future, but never published it (only a few fragments remain). Fantastical elements can also be found in works inspired by folk literature, such as Adam Mickiewicz's Ballads and Romances or Juliusz Słowacki's Balladyna, as well as in Gothic novels. Mickiewicz was interested in the "future" and planned to write a utopia where technology would play an important role. In the 1840s, the Bohemian Warsaw literary group drew on fantastical motifs from folk literature and German Romanticism, particularly the works of Ernst Theodor Amadeus Hoffmann. One of the works from this period that is close to the conventions of science fiction is the historical novel Sędziwoj by Józef Bohdan Dziekoński from 1845. In 1858, Podróż po Księżycu odbyta przez Serafina Bolińskiego (Journey to the Moon Undertaken by Serafin Boliński) by Teodor Tripplin anticipated positivist novels about inventions. Science fiction of the positivist era included popular science lectures with educational purposes (e.g., Baśń o niezgodnych królewiczach by Maria Julia Zaleska or Gucio zaczarowany by Zofia Urbanowska) and works about "wondrous inventions", e.g., Niewidzialny by Sygurd Wiśniowski or the Parisian episode in The Doll by Bolesław Prus, perhaps the most famous Polish writer of the time. Similar themes are seen in the works of Prus' colleague, Stefan Żeromski, with his 'houses of glass' in Przedwiośnie, and his death rays in Róża. Both trends stemmed from the positivists' program, which included promoting natural sciences.

In the early 20th century, Jerzy Żuławski was probably the most popular Polish science fiction author, with his Lunar Trilogy (Trylogia księżycowa), a masterpiece for its time and place of composition. According to Antoni Smuszkiewicz:

For many years, Polish science fiction developed somewhat in the shadow of Jerzy Żuławski, but no work until Stanisław Lem's era matched the trilogy either in the weight of the issues discussed or in literary quality.

Science fiction of the Young Poland period was associated with the era's interests in paranormal phenomena and the causes of personality disorders. For example, Antoni Lange rationalized spiritualistic phenomena in his works and showed an interest in contemporary science. Władysław Umiński’s work was more subdued and in the older positivist style (e.g., Na drugą planetę [To the Second Planet], 1895).

=== 1918–1939 ===
In Polish science fiction of the interwar period, grotesque elements began to be used, mainly for satirical purposes. New authors and new issues emerged. Among the new themes, the concept of a miraculous invention was particularly explored (e.g., Eliksir profesora Bohusza [Elixir of Professor Bohusz] by Stefan Barszczewski from 1923), a motif that also appeared in crime novels (e.g., Błękitny szpieg [The Blue Spy] by Jerzy Bohdan Rychliński from 1926) and adventure stories (e.g., Wyspa elektryczna [The Electric Island] by Edward Krüger from 1925, Wyspa Mędrców [The Island of the Wise] by Maria Buyno-Arctowa from 1930). The catastrophism of the era led to the creation of future-oriented novels from the 1920s onward, in which disaster often played a central role, sometimes on a cosmic scale. In popular literature, this catastrophe was either reversible or one from which representatives of the highest values of a dying civilization were saved (an exception being Ostatni na Ziemi [The Last on Earth] by Wacław Niezabitowski), reinforcing beliefs in the possibility of overcoming any failure, often thanks to the actions of characters of Polish descent. In high literature, the theme of catastrophe was presented in the form of grotesque (e.g., Nienasycanie [Insatiability] by Stanisław Ignacy Witkiewicz, S.O.S. by Jalu Kurek). In the 1930s, the threat of armed conflict led to the decline of popular prose dedicated to cataclysms, and it was replaced by a few artistic works (e.g., Dwa końce świata [The Two Ends of the World] by Antoni Słonimski from 1937). The conventions of science fiction were also referenced by authors such as Stefan Żeromski (e.g., the "Dana rays" from Róża [The Rose] from 1909; the "glass houses" from The Spring to Come from 1924).

=== 1945–1989 ===
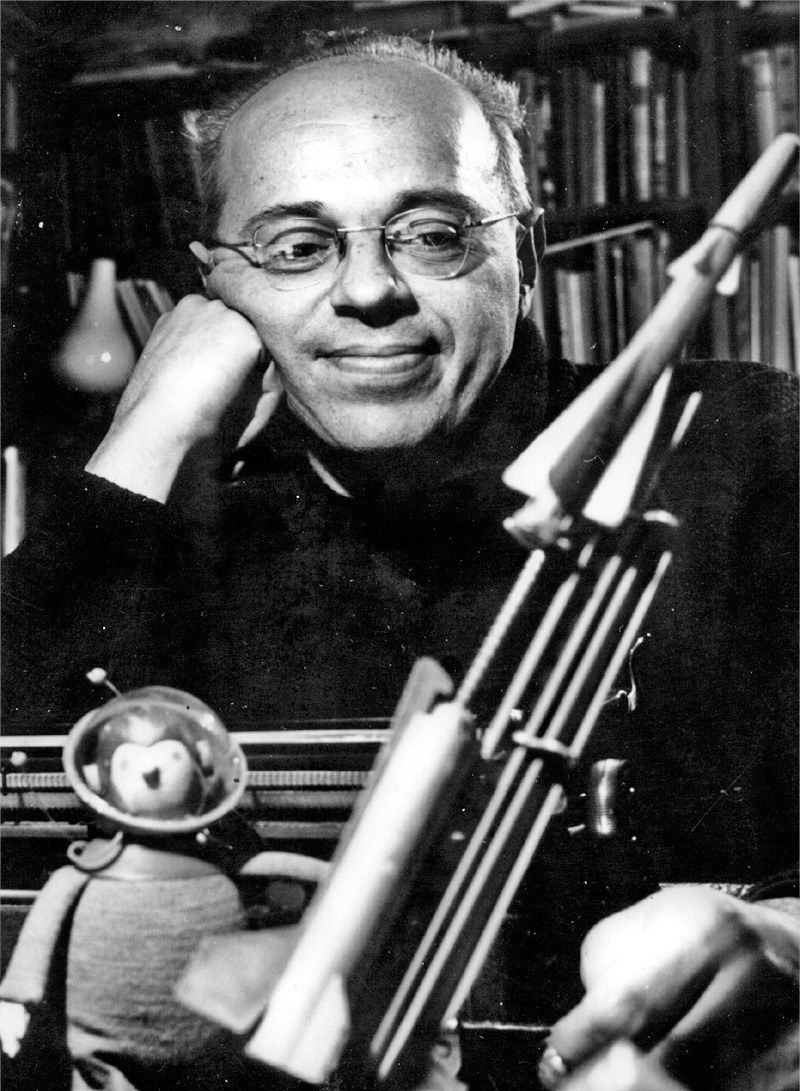
Stanisław Lem, a prominent Polish science fiction writer

After World War II, in the first decade of the People's Republic of Poland, science fiction was used as a propaganda tool by the communist regime, with its main purpose being to show the "bright future" of communism. Only after Joseph Stalin's death were Polish writers to gain more leeway and start questioning the reality around them, albeit always struggling against censorship. Science fiction literature was treated with caution by the authorities of the Polish People's Republic. Despite this, in 1946, Stanisław Lem's first novel, The Man from Mars, was published in the magazine Nowy Świat Przygód. The first post-war science fiction book was Schron na Placu Zamkowym (The Shelter on Castle Square) by Andrzej Ziemięcki from 1947; that same year, Baczność! A.R. 7: Powieść o atomie (Attention! A.R. 7: A Novel About the Atom) by Kazimierz Wroczyński was also published. A slight increase in interest in science fiction was sparked by the anthology Polska nowela fantastyczna (Polish Fantastic Novel) published in 1949 by Julian Tuwim. In 1951, Lem made his book debut with The Astronauts, and in 1955, he published The Magellanic Cloud. At that time, he was an undisputed leader of Polish science fiction, first questioning the regime's actions in his Memoirs Found in a Bathtub. He was followed by Janusz A. Zajdel, Konrad Fiałkowski and Czesław Chruszczewski, and from the mid-70s for a short period by the acclaimed writings of Adam Wiśniewski-Snerg. The principles of socialist realism adopted in 1949 meant that some works were written in a tendentious and sometimes even caricatural manner.

The Polish October led to changes in cultural policy, allowing the publication of novels written many years earlier – in 1956, Zaziemskie światy (Worlds Beyond Earth) by Władysław Umiński, a veteran of Polish science fiction, and Ludzie ery atomowej (People of the Atomic Age) by Roman Gajda (both completed in 1948) were released. The literature of this period is characterized by an optimistic vision of a future society that, having satisfied its needs on Earth, decides to "reach for the stars". Before 1960, several more novels of varying quality were published, such as Przez ocean czasu (Across the Ocean of Time) by Bohdan Korewicki, W pogoni za Czarnym Karłem (In Pursuit of the Black Dwarf) by Eugeniusz Morski, Aspazja (Aspasia) by Andrzej Ostoja-Owsiany, Katastrofa na „Słońcu Antarktydy” (The Disaster on the "Sun of the Antarctic") by Adam Hollanek, and the final part of the Boruń and Trepka trilogy, Kosmiczni bracia (Cosmic Brothers). Finally, Poland began to print science fiction works by Western authors (the first American anthologies, W stronę czwartego wymiaru [Toward the Fourth Dimension] and Rakietowe szlaki [Rocket Trails], were published in 1958 through the efforts of Julian Stawiński).

The 1960s marked the flourishing of Lem's work, during which he published such novels as Eden (1959), Solaris, Return from the Stars, and Memoirs Found in a Bathtub (all in 1961), The Invincible (1964), and His Master's Voice (1968). Simultaneously, Lem's works began to include grotesque elements that referenced the philosophical tales of earlier authors (e.g., The Star Diaries, Księga robotów [The Book of Robots], The Cyberiad). This period also saw the crystallization of the conventions of Polish science fiction, accomplished by writers such as Lem, Krzysztof Boruń, Konrad Fiałkowski, Maciej Kuczyński, and Witold Zegalski. During this time, several new authors debuted, including Edmund Wnuk-Lipiński and Janusz Zajdel, while Jerzy Broszkiewicz and Alfred Szklarski published fantastic works for young readers.

In the 1970s, writers such as Bohdan Petecki, Wiktor Żwikiewicz, and Adam Wiśniewski-Snerg published their first works, with Wiśniewski-Snerg's debut novel Robot causing a significant stir in the literary community. In the late 1970s, the genre social science fiction (Polish: fantastyka socjologiczna) arose in the People's Republic of Poland. At these times it focused on the development of societies dominated by totalitarian governments. The genre is dominated by Janusz A. Zajdel (Limes Inferior, Paradyzja), Edmund Wnuk-Lipiński (Apostezjon trilogy), Adam Wiśniewski-Snerg and Marek Oramus. Some works by Stanisław Lem can also be classified within this genre. The fantastical settings of books of this genre were usually only a pretext for analysing the structure of Polish society, and were always full of allusions to reality.

In 1976, the third Eurocon was held in Poznań. The 1984 Polish science fiction comedy film Sexmission became a cult classic in Poland and has been widely aired abroad. Other examples of Polish speculative fiction films include the films of Piotr Szulkin.

=== 1989–present ===
The systemic transformation that took place in 1989 also affected the position of fantasy literature in the country. State-owned publishing houses lost their monopolistic positions. Newly established, often short-lived companies sought to make up for many years of backlog by massively publishing Western science fiction literature, which was often of low quality. The genre largely transformed itself into political fiction, represented by writers such as Rafał A. Ziemkiewicz, although an echo is visible in the 1990s dystopia/hard sf duology by Tomasz Kołodziejczak.

After 1989, new stars of Polish science fiction emerged, including figures such as Jacek Dukaj, Marek Huberath, Rafał Kosik, Szczepan Twardoch, Wit Szostak, and Łukasz Orbitowski. Changes also affected the only magazine on the market, Fantastyka. The fall of the state publisher meant that the editorial team took over the magazine, with Lech Jęczmyk becoming the editor-in-chief, followed by Maciej Parowski for a longer period.

In the 1990s, a group of young creators centered around the Trust group (later the Klub Tfurców, including Rafał Ziemkiewicz and Jarosław Grzędowicz) began publishing the monthly magazine Fenix. There was also an explosion of translations, primarily from the Western (English language) literature. The major Polish publishing house specializing in Polish science fiction and fantasy literature was SuperNOWA. The scene was transformed around and after 2002, with SuperNOWA losing its dominant position, and many new Polish writers, the "2002 generation", appearing.

Much of contemporary Polish science fiction and fantasy resembles that familiar to English-language writers. There are many science fiction writers as well as fantasy writers in Poland, and their works vary from alternate histories to hard science fiction. The best internationally known Polish science fiction writer is undoubtedly Stanisław Lem, although many others can be considered world-class.

A trailer for the 2015 video game The Witcher 3: Wild Hunt

The Witcher franchise of fantasy literature by Andrzej Sapkowski has gained global popularity and received multiple adaptations. In the late 2010s, the video game series, developed by the Polish company CD Projekt, became a best-seller worldwide. A live-action television adaptation was created by Lauren Schmidt Hissrich for Netflix, first releasing in 2021. The Netflix series inspired the animated films Nightmare of the Wolf and Sirens of the Deep. Aside from The Witcher series, CD Projekt is also known for Cyberpunk 2077, a science fiction video game in the cyberpunk subgenre. The game won over 100 awards at E3 2018, including Best Game, Best Xbox One Game, Best PC Game, Best RPG, and People's Choice at IGN, Best Role-Playing Game and Game of the Show at Game Informer, Best of E3 at PC Gamer, and Game of the Show at GamesRadar+. Cyberpunk: Edgerunners, an anime spin-off collaboration co-produced by CD Projekt Red and Trigger, premiered on 13 September 2022 on Netflix. A sequel to Cyberpunk 2077 was announced in October 2022.

== Publishers ==
Iskry Publishing House released its first science fiction book in 1953 (two Soviet novels were published that year: Nowa planeta [The New Planet] by Viktor Saparin and Plutonia by Vladimir Obruchev). Starting in 1966, the publisher launched the first Polish series dedicated to science fiction, Fantastyka-Przygoda (Fantasy-Adventure), which continued until the mid-1990s and released over 100 volumes. Lech Jęczmyk later became its editor.

Nasza Księgarnia published its first science fiction title in 1954 (a reprint of Bakteria 078 by Marian Leon Bielicki). This publisher made a mark in history by releasing the first science fiction anthology on the Polish market, Posłanie z piątej planety (A Message from the Fifth Planet) in 1964, the result of an international reader competition, with a foreword by Zbigniew Przyrowski. This esteemed publisher, known as the Hugo Gernsback of Polish science fiction, also edited other anthologies that reflected the development and history of Polish science fiction: Nowa cywilizacja (New Civilization), Wołanie na Mlecznej Drodze (The Call on the Milky Way), and Drugi próg życia (The Second Threshold of Life). Starting in 1974, Nasza Księgarnia published the series Stało się jutro (Tomorrow Has Come) with 33 volumes by 1990.

Wydawnictwo Poznańskie also had its own science fiction series. The first few titles were published in a short-lived series called Przygoda. Awantura. Sensacja (Adventure. Intrigue. Sensation), which included works such as W pogoni za Czarnym Karłem (In Pursuit of the Black Dwarf, 1957) by Eugeniusz Morski and Krater czarnego snu (The Crater of the Black Dream, 1960) by Witold Zegalski. A second series, marked with the letters SF, began in 1975 and mostly featured niche Polish science fiction (such as works by Czesław Chruszczewski and Jacek Sawaszkiewicz). It also included significant historical works, such as Antoni Smuszkiewicz's Zaczarowana gra. Zarys dziejów polskiej fantastyki naukowej (The Enchanted Game: An Outline of the History of Polish Science Fiction) and the Leksykon polskiej literatury fantastycznonaukowej (Lexicon of Polish Science Fiction Literature) by Niewiadowski and Smuszkiewicz.

In 1974, the Krajowa Agencja Wydawnicza launched the series Fantazja–Przygoda–Rozrywka (Fantasy–Adventure–Entertainment), with 33 volumes and 12 booklets published by 1985. The Czytelnik Publishing House made its mark by releasing Stanisław Lem's first science fiction novel, The Astronauts. After departing from Iskry Publishing House in 1978, Lech Jęczmyk began editing the Seria Z kosmonautą (Cosmonaut Series) at Czytelnik, which published 40 volumes by the early 1990s. In 1980, the series won the Premio Europeo at the 5th Eurocon in Stresa, and two years later, it received the Prix Européen at the 6th Eurocon in Mönchengladbach. The Kraków-based Wydawnictwo Literackie, the main publisher of Stanisław Lem's works, occasionally published science fiction under the series Fantastyka i Groza (Science fiction and Horror). Political issues prevented the publisher from successfully launching a series of fantastic literature under Lem's patronage — only four books were released under the Stanisław Lem poleca series.

There are two major Polish publishing houses specializing in Polish science fiction and fantasy, Fabryka Słów and Runa. SuperNOWA, once a dominant publishing house on that field, has now lost much of its position. MAG and Solaris (since 2019, Stalker Books) publish mostly translations, and in what is seen as boom for the Polish science fiction and fantasy market, mainstream publishing houses are increasingly publishing such works as well. A book with a circulation of over 10,000 is considered a bestseller in Poland. In the 21st century, Poland has seen an increase in manga publishing companies; in 2019, there were seven, with over 400 titles published that year.

=== Journals ===
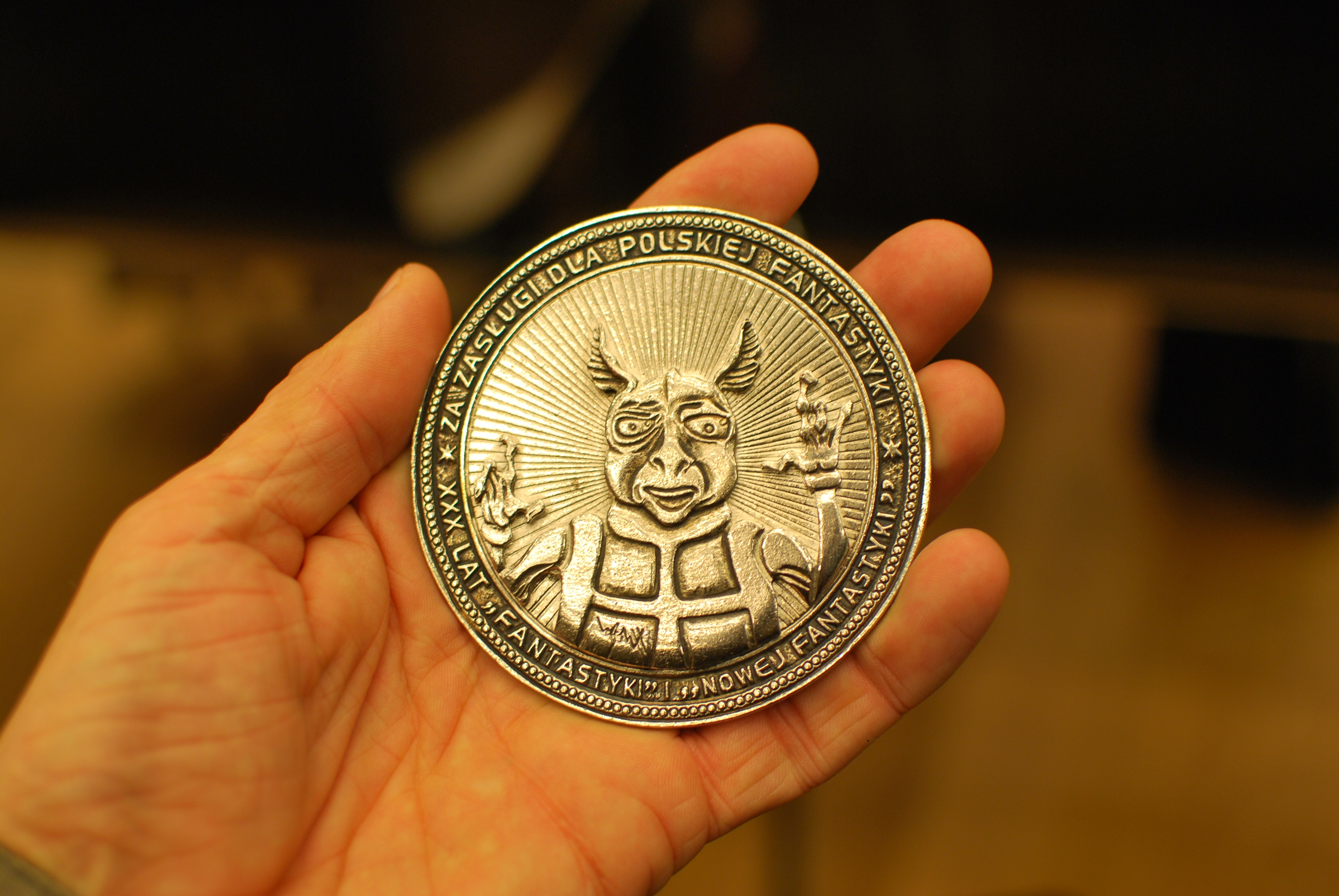
30th anniversary of Fantastyka plaque, Festival of Comics in Łódź, 2012

In the second half of the 1970s, a nationwide magazine dedicated to science fiction was attempted by the Poznań-based writer and activist Czesław Chruszczewski, but the endeavor was unsuccessful. Andrzej Wójcik recalls that the idea for creating such a magazine came from a member of the National Club of Fantasy and Science Fiction Enthusiasts, Andrzej Pruszyński. After years of effort, aided by contacts with Polish United Workers' Party activists Hieronim Kubiak and Karol Rodek (the father of fandom activist Jacek Rodek), a group of enthusiasts received permission to launch the magazine in May 1982. However, the authorities did not agree to appoint Krzysztof Boruń as the editor-in-chief, so Adam Hollanek was named instead.

The first issue of the magazine – the monthly Fantastyka, later renamed to Nowa Fantastyka – was published in October 1982. Its launch became a milestone for Polish fantasy enthusiasts and creators. It gained a cult following and became a training ground for some of the most prominent fantasy and sci-fi writers in Poland, including Andrzej Sapkowski (The Witcher series). Among the editorial team, Maciej Parowski is particularly noteworthy for having significantly shaped the image of Polish fantasy in the years that followed. Since its first publication in 1982, Fantastyka became, in terms of circulation, the leading magazine in Europe and the second worldwide dedicated to fantasy, reaching 140,000 copies.

Another major Polish science fiction and fantasy monthly magazine, founded in 2001 and active until 2012, was Science Fiction, which published mainly new Polish works and had fewer translations than Fantastyka. SFinks As of 2006, both had a circulation of about 8,000–15,000. Other significant, discontinued magazines include Fenix (1990–2001), SFinks (1994–2002) and Magia i Miecz (1993–2002). Several are published online in ezine form, including Fahrenheit (1997–) and Esensja (2000–).

== Literary criticism ==
Research on the scientific romance began in the early 20th century. Na srebrnym globie. Rękopis z Księżyca (On the Silver Globe: Manuscript from the Moon), the first volume of Żuławski's Trylogia księżycowa (Lunar Trilogy), received a critical review in 1903. Reviews and commentaries were published in Prawda, Kurier Literacko-Naukowy, Museion, Chimera, Książka, Kurier Naukowy, and Tygodnik Illustrowany. Between World War I and World War II, Polish writers on the subject of fantasy included Karol Irzykowski (Fantastyka, 1918), Stanisław Baczyński (O pojęciu fantastyczności [On the Concept of Fantasy], 1927), Kazimierz Czachowski (Obraz współczesnej literatury polskiej [The Picture of Contemporary Polish Literature], 1934–1936, which featured a chapter on science fiction), and Ignacy Fik (Dwadzieścia lat literatury polskiej [Twenty Years of Polish Literature], 1939, which included a genre breakdown). Post-war criticism initially regarded science fiction as Western entertainment literature. The first novels by Lem were defended by critics such as Andrzej Kijowski, Ludwik Flaszen, and Adam Hollanek. Lem himself expressed his position in articles like O współczesnych zadaniach i metodzie pisarstwa fantastyczno-naukowego [On the Contemporary Tasks and Methods of Science Fiction Writing] (Nowa Kultura, No. 39, 1952) and Imperializm na Marsie [Imperialism on Mars] (Życie Literackie, No. 7, 1953). From this point onward, literary criticism became dominated by "the creative reflection of Lem".

== Fandom ==
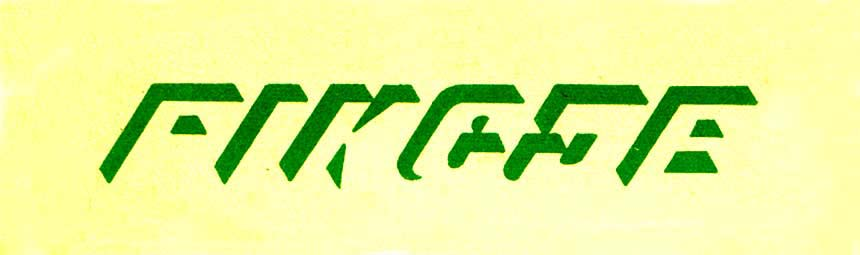
Logo of Fikcje magazine

Zines dedicated to science fiction appeared in Poland alongside the formation of the first organizations that united fans of the genre in the 1970s. Some of the earliest zines were Informator miłośników fantastyki (published since 1976 by the National Club of Fantasy and Science Fiction Enthusiasts), Somnambul (several issues published between 1978 and 1979 by the Science Fiction Enthusiasts' Club at the Medical University of Silesia), Materiały (a monthly published between 1979 and 1980), and Pulsar (the first issue, dedicated to the history and criticism of science fiction, was released in July 1979). Other zines from the Polish People's Republic era include Fikcje, Kurier Fantastyczny, Tachion, No Wave, Kwazar (published from 1979 to 1985; recognized as the best zine at the 7th Eurocon in Ljubljana in 1983), SFanzin, Radiant (1978–1981), Spectrum (1982–1984), Wizje (2 issues in 1981), and XYX.

There is also a prominent anime and manga fandom in Poland that has developed since the 1990s and several anime and manga conventions exist in the country. By the beginning of the 2000s, there was typically one convention held per month, and within a few years, the annual number reached around 30. By the end of the 1990s, the Polish manga and anime community was estimated to consist of around 10,000 to 15,000 individuals. By the mid-2010s, this number had grown to 100,000.

=== Organizations ===
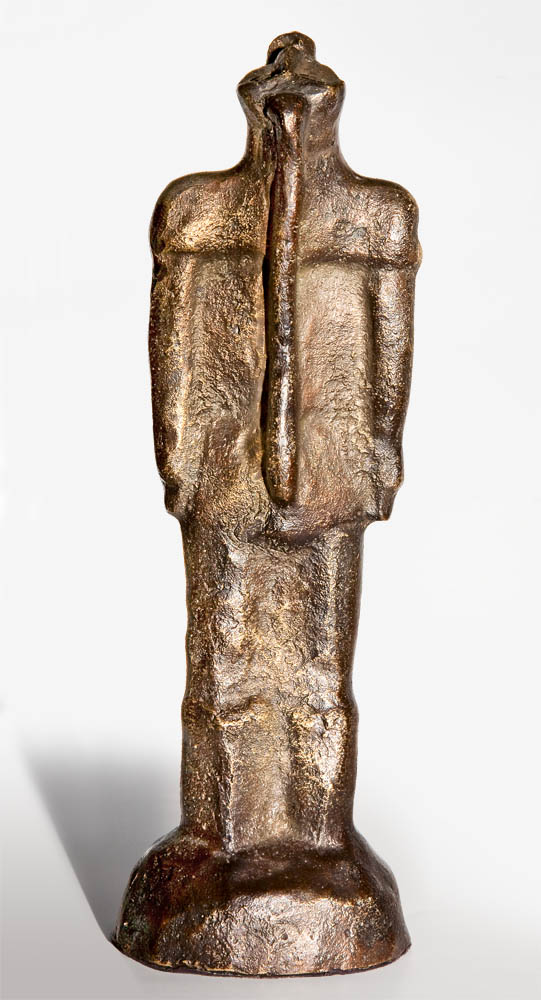
Sfinks Award statuette

In February 1976, the National Club of Fantasy and Science Fiction Enthusiasts was established through the merger of the Warsaw Fantasy Enthusiasts Club, based at the Old Town Collectors Club Antykwariat, and the Student FAN-Club, affiliated with the Socialist Union of Polish Students at the University of Warsaw UBAB. The National Club collaborated with magazines such as Argumenty, itd, Perspektywy, Razem, Nowy Wyraz (a special issue dedicated to works by club-affiliated creators was published in 1977), Sztandar Młodych, and Tygodnik Demokratyczny. The club was dissolved in 1981. On June 15 of the same year, the Polish Association of Science Fiction Enthusiasts was registered. The association had branches in Olsztyn, Warsaw, Zielona Góra, Pruszków, Staszów, Żyrardów, Opole, Ostrołęka, Bydgoszcz, Lublin, Świnoujście, and Kielce. It published the magazines Feniks and SFera and managed the Stefan Grabiński Fund, which financed scholarships and grants for creators. In 1985, the association had approximately 1,500 members.

In the Polish People's Republic, in addition to the National Club and the Polish Association, fan organizations also operated in cities such as Białystok, Bydgoszcz, Chełmno, Częstochowa, Gdańsk (Gdańsk Science Fiction Club), Gliwice, Gorzów Wielkopolski, Inowrocław, Katowice (Śląski Klub Fantastyki), Kętrzyn, Kłodzko, Konin, Kraków, Łódź, Opole (SOKIBUS-F), Piotrków Trybunalski, Poznań, Płock, Rzeszów, Skoczów, Szczecin, and Wrocław.

Polish science fiction fandom is prominent, with dozens of science fiction conventions throughout Poland. The largest of them is Polcon (first held in 1982), other prominent ones include Falkon, Imladris, Krakon and Nordcon. Science fiction conventions in Poland are de facto almost always "science fiction and fantasy conventions", and are often heavily mixed with role-playing gaming conventions. The most important comic books and science-fiction conventions in Poland include the Warsaw Comic Con and the International Festival of Comics and Games in Łódź.

== See also ==
- Anime and manga fandom in Poland
- Klerykal fiction

== Bibliography ==
- Niewiadomski, Andrzej; Smuszkiewicz, Antoni (1990). "Fantastyka naukowa w literaturze polskiej. Zarys historyczny" [Science Fiction in Polish Literature: A Historical Outline]. Leksykon polskiej literatury fantastycznonaukowej [Lexicon of Polish Science Fiction Literature] (in Polish). Poznań: Wydawnictwo Poznańskie. ISBN 83-210-0892-5.
- Niewiadowski, Andrzej (1987). Polska fantastyka naukowa: przewodnik: 1945–1985 [Polish Science Fiction: A Guide: 1945–1985] (in Polish). Warsaw: Wydawnictwo Iskry. ISBN 83-207-0999-7.
- Smuszkiewicz, Antoni (1982). Zaczarowana gra. Zarys dziejów polskiej fantastyki naukowej [The Enchanted Game: An Outline of the History of Polish Science Fiction] (in Polish). Poznań: Wydawnictwo Poznańskie. ISBN 83-210-0303-6.
- Parowski, Maciej (1990). Czas fantastyki [The Time of Science Fiction] (in Polish). Szczecin: Glob. ISBN 83-7007-193-7.
- Wójcik, Andrzej; Żelkowski, Marek (2015). "Kierowałem się zamiłowaniem do fantastyki" [I was guided by my passion for fantasy]. Czas Fantastyki (in Polish). 4 (44). Warsaw: Prószyński Media. ISSN 1733-635X.
- Reczulski, Łukasz (2023). Narodziny i rozkwit Polskiej Rzeczypospolitej Mangowej [The Birth and Flourishing of the Polish Manga Republic] (in Polish). Łódź: Instytut Archeologii Uniwersytetu Łódzkiego. ISBN 978-83-963463-7-7.
