= Social science fiction in Poland =

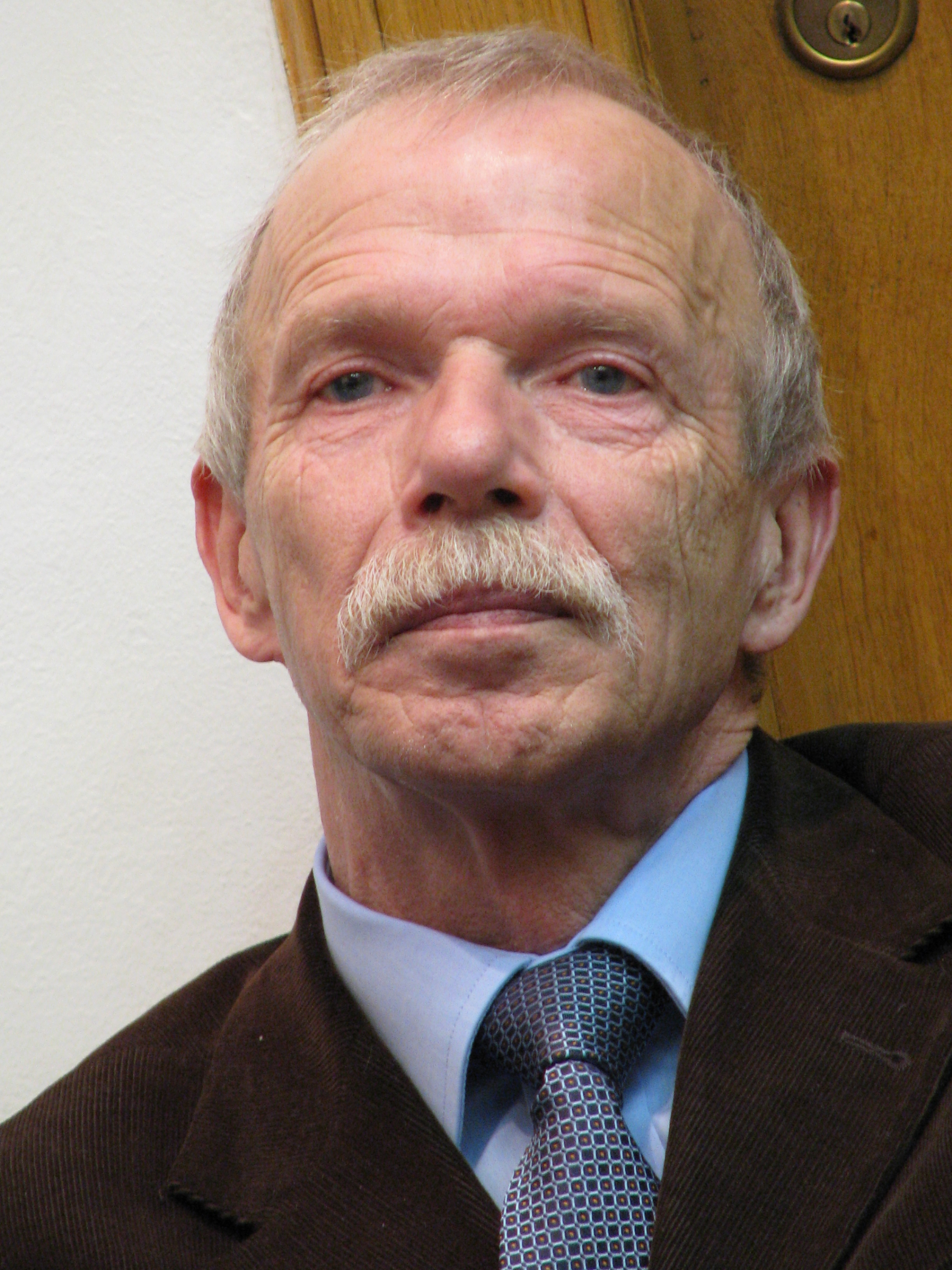
Edmund Wnuk-Lipiński

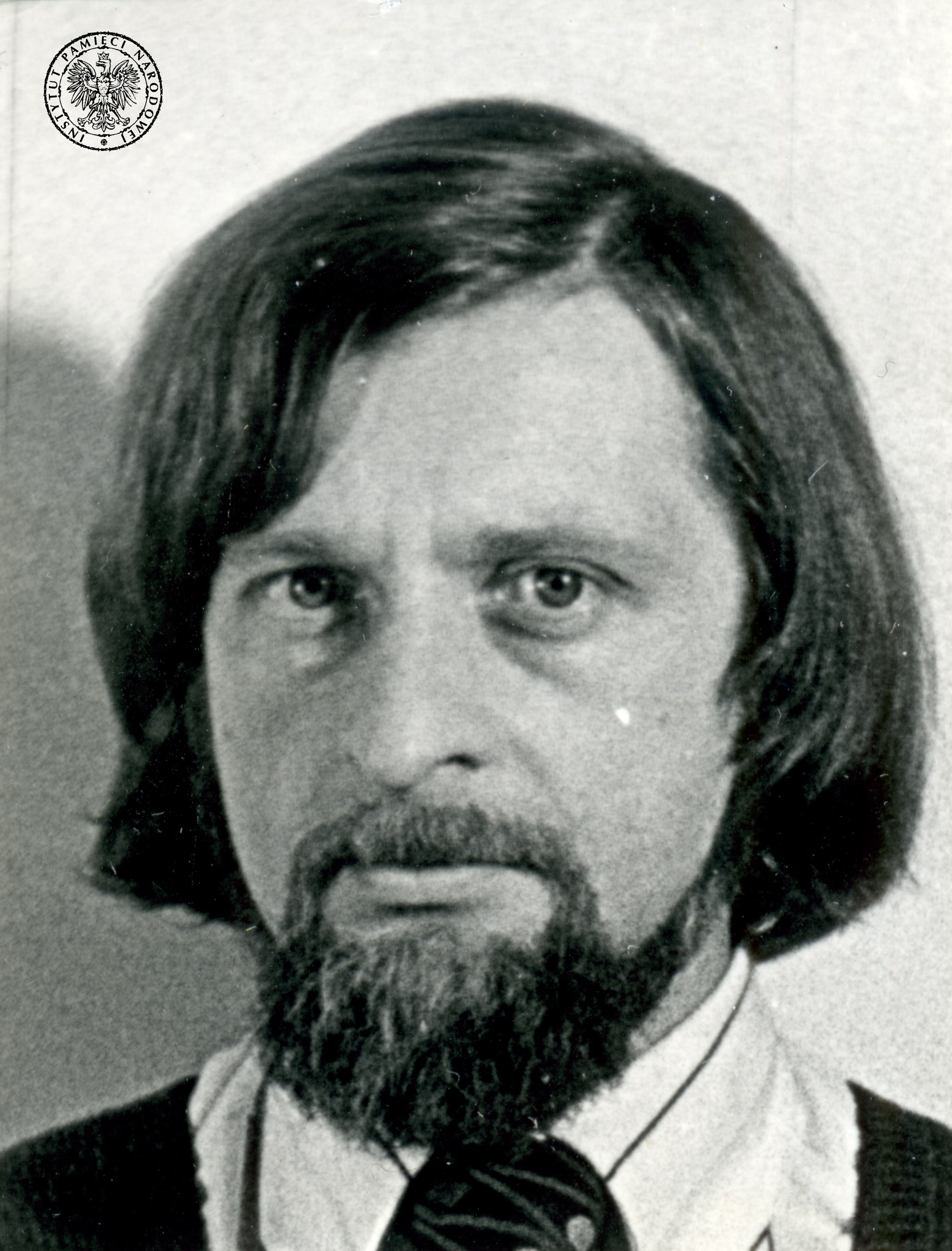
Janusz A. Zajdel

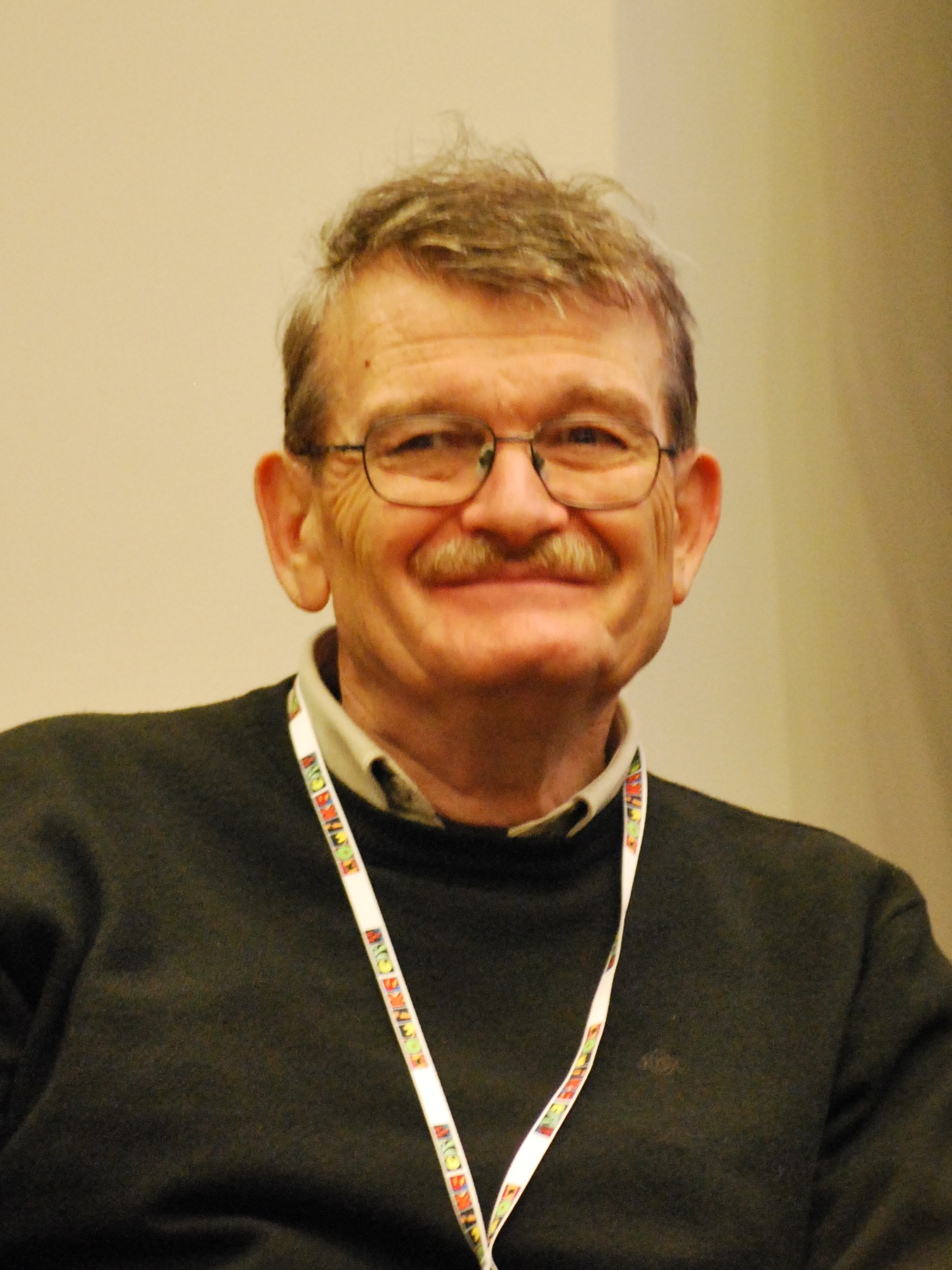
Maciej Parowski

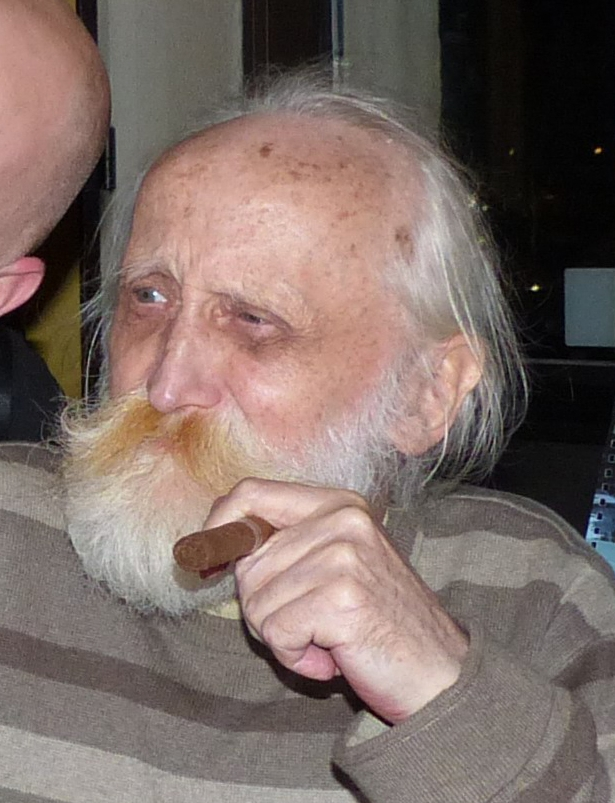
Wiktor Żwikiewicz

Social science fiction in Poland or sociological science fiction is a subgenre of science fiction that falls within the scope of social science fiction. It emerged in Polish science fiction literature in the second half of the 1970s and was present until the end of the 1980s (although some argue that the movement effectively died out by the mid-1980s). Critics describe the trend as a literary and social phenomenon.

Antoni Smuszkiewicz believes that in relation to Polish works, the term political fiction would be more appropriate, a sentiment echoed by Robert Klementowski.

Klementowski asserts that the trend [...] became an original and one of the most distinctive phenomena of Polish post-war literature, influencing subsequent generations of Polish authors, and that the transformations initiated at that time contain the roots of today's fantasy, understood as a phenomenon not only literary but also social.

== History ==
Adam Mazurkiewicz traces the roots of this phenomenon to the popularity of Latin American literature in Poland during the 1970s, which began with the publication of Hopscotch by Julio Cortázar in 1968. This unique cult made it possible to talk about politics without falling into journalism. According to Przemysław Czapliński, the Polish reader received a literary statement that commented on their non-textual experience – somewhat substitutive, as it did not fit specifically into Polish realities, although it universalized the totalitarian experience, enabling Polish audiences to see parallels to their native reality.

Mazurkiewicz identifies a second factor that influenced the formation of science fiction literature in Poland at the turn of the 1970s and 1980s: the publication of the anthology series Kroki w nieznane (Steps into the Unknown), edited by Lech Jęczmyk between 1970 and 1976. The ambitious prose presented there had a strong influence on the writers publishing at that time. Mazurkiewicz cites Rafał Ziemkiewicz's opinion that the introduction of the concept of fantasy, identified with metaphor and a means of artistic expression, to the Polish reader in the pages of 'Steps into the Unknown' had a strong impact on the writers publishing at that time, which resulted in the search for a new concept of social fantasy that metaphorically described the present.

Andrzej Niewiadowski, outlining the political and social background of the movement, writes that it was in some sense prepared by the authorities, who, at the moment of the collapse of the propaganda of success, wanted to find successors to Stanisław Lem endowed with literary talent. However, these actions had the opposite effect: the young writers, whose debuts were thus made easier, began to create on their own account, ignoring the enlightened advice of their mentors.

The first signal of changes in Polish fantasy was the publication of the anthology Wołanie na Mlecznej Drodze (A Call on the Milky Way) in 1976, where it turned out that the debutants had a critical attitude towards convention, old themes, were distrustful of technology, and contested optimistic visions of the world [...] and scientific motivation clearly loosened. Previously, a significant event in Polish fantasy of the early 1970s was the debut of Adam Wiśniewski-Snerg with Robot (1973), in which the author focused on the issue of the essence of humanity in a technicized world. In the second half of the 1970s, psychological issues were taken up by Jacek Sawaszkiewicz, Wiktor Żwikiewicz, Wiesław Malinowski, as well as older generation creators known until then for writing hard science fiction: Adam Hollanek, Konrad Fiałkowski, and Krzysztof Boruń.

== Issues ==
At the turn of the 1970s and 1980s, there was a quantitative and qualitative boom in Polish science fiction. Andrzej Niewiadowski writes that essentially, after 1976, almost all Polish SF became prose of a sociological nature.

During this period, creators were no longer satisfied with the conventional formulas. Instead, "space adventures" were increasingly replaced by sociological diagnoses. In works of this genre, the fantastic plot was merely a pretext for deliberations that had little to do with the described reality, and the choice of plot situations allowed for a multiplicity of meanings. As a result, fantastic works could mirror the realities of the contemporary world for the reader [...] be an allusion, a metaphor, thereby drawing attention to phenomena that troubled readers while pretending to depict a distant future, thus staying on the fringes of censorship interest.

Ziemkiewicz assessed that Polish SF creators did not focus on creating models of new social solutions (as in Western science fiction) but on formulating warnings against the degeneration of existing models. The writers themselves did not hide that the goal of their works, dealing with non-existent societies, was to expose the present. By scrutinizing the pathologies of the contemporary Polish People's Republic, they warned against their potential consequences.

Janusz Zajdel said:

We need to write the truth in a veiled form to break through the armor that protects the real vision of the world. The truth is dressed in a costume and only then released among the people. This is characteristic of societies where the significance of words does not matter, but their sound does, where an imaginary image of reality is presented to be believed. The same truth, but expressed differently, will pass through certain cordons that are set up.

Although the individual as a part of society relating to power and civilization was present in other works, the most popular books at that time were those allusive in their message, referring to the reality of the late Gierek era in the Polish People's Republic, by authors such as Edmund Wnuk-Lipiński, Janusz Zajdel, Maciej Parowski, Marek Oramus, Czesław Białczyński, Andrzej Krzepkowski, and Andrzej Wójcik.

Robert Klementowski states that at the turn of the 1970s and 1980s, we were dealing with prose so different from that of the 1960s that doubts arise as to whether we are still talking about the same literary genre – they differ to such a significant extent.

Scholars assess that the social science fiction created at that time served a similar function to historical fiction in the post-war period, where – due to the inability to write directly – the past was merely a pretext for seeking references to the reader's present.

Maciej Parowski writes: Polish SF creators [...] within a few years tried first to shout out and then analyze the problems of one country conquering another.

== Selected works of Polish social science fiction ==
- Edmund Wnuk-Lipiński: Apostezjon Trilogy – Wir pamięci (The Whirlpool of Memory, 1979), Rozpad połowiczny (Half-Life, 1988), Mord założycielski (Founding Murder, 1989);
- Andrzej Krzepkowski, Andrzej Wójcik: Obszar nieciągłości (The Area of Discontinuity, 1979);
- Janusz Zajdel: Van Troff's Cylinder (1980), Limes inferior (1982), Wyjście z cienia (Emerging from the Shadow, 1983), Cała prawda o planecie Ksi (The Complete Truth About Planet Xi, 1983), Paradyzja (1984);
- Marek Oramus: Senni zwycięzcy (Sleepy Victors, 1982), Dzień drogi do Meorii (A Day's Journey to Meoria, 1990);
- Wiktor Żwikiewicz: Druga jesień (Second Autumn, 1982);
- Maciej Parowski: Twarzą ku ziemi (Face to the Ground, 1982);
- Czesław Białczyński: Miliardy białych płatków (Billions of White Flakes, 1983);
- Andrzej Ziemiański: Daimonion (short stories, 1985), Wojny urojone (Imaginary Wars, 1987), Bramy strachu (Gates of Fear, 1990);
- Rafał A. Ziemkiewicz: Władca szczurów (Lord of the Rats, short stories, 1987).

The first published work in this subgenre of science fiction is considered to be Edmund Wnuk-Lipiński's Wir pamięci, released in 1979. However, the novels by Janusz Zajdel gained the most recognition and popularity. Critics believe that Marek Oramus' novel Dzień drogi do Meorii from 1990 marks the symbolic closure of this trend in Polish science fiction.

Almost all of these novels were published long after their creation. This delay was partly due to the cultural policies of the authorities following the declaration of martial law in Poland. In 1982, to alleviate public discontent, the government decided to release many previously withheld works (including mainstream literature like Jerzy Andrzejewski's Miazga (Pulp) and, after years of efforts, allowed the publication of the magazine Fantastyka. Druga jesień, a novel completed in 1977, was published five years later. Senni zwycięscy, written between 1976 and 1978, was released four years later. Twarzą ku ziemi, completed in 1979, was published after three years.

== See also ==
- Science fiction and fantasy in Poland

== Bibliography ==
- Parowski, Maciej (1990). Czas fantastyki (in Polish). Szczecin: Glob. ISBN 83-7007-193-7.
- Parowski, Maciej (2011). Małpy Pana Boga. Słowa (in Polish). Narodowe Centrum Kultury. ISBN 978-83-61587-72-9.
- Leś, Mariusz (2008). Fantastyka socjologiczna. Poetyka i myślenie utopijne (in Polish). Wydawnictwo Uniwersytetu w Białymstoku. ISBN 978-83-7431-191-5.
- Mazurkiewicz, Adam (2011). "Między fantastyką i aluzją: SOCIAL FICTION jako kryptopolityczny nurt polskiej literatury lat siedemdziesiątych i osiemdziesiątych XX wieku" (PDF). Acta Universitatis Lodziensis. Folia Litteraria Polonica (in Polish). 14 (2). Łódź: Uniwersytet Łódzki. ISSN 1505-9057.
- Niewiadowski, Andrzej (1989). "Świadectwa prognoz społecznych w polskiej fantastyce naukowej (1945–1985)". In Handke, Ryszard; Jęczymyk, Lech; Okólska, Barbara (eds.). Spór o SF (in Polish). Poznań: Wydawnictwo Poznańskie. ISBN 83-210-0815-1.
- Klementowski, Robert (2003). Modelowe boksowanie ze światem. Polska literatura fantastyczna na przełomie lat 70. i 80 (in Polish). Toruń: Wydawnictwo Adam Marszałek. ISBN 83-7322-608-7.
- Szczerbakiewicz, Rafał (2015). "Metonimie PRL-u w fantastyce lat 80. Przypadek Paradyzji (1984) Janusza Zajdla" (PDF). In Budrowska, Kamila; Jurkowska, Elżbieta; Gardocki, Wiktor (eds.). 1984. Literatura i kultura schyłkowego PRL-u (PDF). Badania filologiczne nad cenzurą PRL (in Polish). Vol. V. Białystok: Uniwersytet w Białymstoku. ISBN 978-83-64703-69-0.
