= Drugi próg życia =

Anthology of Polish science fiction stories

- Editor: Zbigniew Przyrowski
- Language: Polish
- Genre: science fiction
- Publisher: Nasza Księgarnia
- Publication date: 1980
- Publication place: Poland
- Media type: anthology

Drugi próg życia (The Second Threshold of Life) is an anthology of Polish science fiction stories, published by Nasza Księgarnia in 1980. It features stories that were originally published in the magazine Młody Technik from 1956 to 1978. The selection was made by Zbigniew Przyrowski, the magazine's editor-in-chief, while Tomasz Borowski designed the book's graphics.

Przyrowski's selection followed several criteria: only works that hadn't appeared in earlier anthologies by the publisher (Posłanie z piątej planety from 1964 and Wołanie na Mlecznej Drodze from 1976) were included, with a rule of "one author – one story". He also aimed to present a diverse range of themes within the anthology.

== Table of contents ==
Chronological order:

- Tadeusz Unkiewicz – Elmis (1956)
- Tadeusz Suchorzewski – Chi-hua-hua (1956)
- Wacław Gołembowicz – Kłopoty z fantazją (Trouble with Fantasy) (1958)
- Stanisław Lem – Test (1958)
- Konrad Fiałkowski – Wróble Galaktyki (The Sparrows of the Galaxy) (1961)
- Andrzej Kossakowski – Nie dałem się uśpić (I Didn't Let Myself Fall Asleep) (1961)
- Krzysztof Boruń – Fantom (Phantom) (1962)
- Stefan Weinfeld – Zwrotnica czasu (The Time Switch) (1964)
- Ryszard Sawwa – Raport (The Report) (1966)
- Andrzej Czechowski – Wieczorne niebo (The Evening Sky) (1967)
- Dariusz Filar – Niezbyt szczęśliwi (Not Very Happy) (1970)
- Adam Jaromin – Kłopoty wynalazcy (The Inventor's Troubles) (1970)
- Witold Zegalski – O człowieku, którego bolała sprężarka (About the Man with the Aching Compressor) (1972)
- Tadeusz Zbigniew Dworak – Model supernowej (The Supernova Model) (1972)
- Krzysztof Malinowski – Uczniowie Paracelsusa (The Students of Paracelsus) (1972)
- Wiktor Żwikiewicz – Marzenie (The Dream) (1972)
- Janusz Zajdel – Przejście przez lustro (Through the Looking Glass) (1973)
- Henryk Gajewski – Precedens (Precedent) (1973)
- Julia Nidecka – Megalomania (1976)
- Jacek Sawaszkiewicz – Patent (1976)
- Mirosław Kwiatek – Drugi próg życia (The Second Threshold of Life) (1977)
- Janusz Siwek – Przydział (The Assignment) (1978)
- Andrzej Urbańczyk – Świerszcz (The Cricket) (1978)
- Andrzej Stoff – Dom (The House) (1978)

== Analysis and critique ==
In presenting the concept of the anthology, Przyrowski wrote in its introduction that the editorial team decided to introduce science fiction into the pages of the magazine in the mid-1950s. This decision was driven by the conviction "that the readers of Młody Technik – that is, young people interested in science and technology, future continuators of civilizational progress – should possess not only scientific and technical knowledge and skills but also a bold and at the same time sharpened imagination that allows them to perceive different aspects of forward-looking ideas and concepts". The editor noted that initially, implementing this resolution encountered difficulties, as they wanted to promote only Polish science fiction, which was challenging because "science fiction was not yet popular in our country". The problems ended with the "golden age" in Stanisław Lem’s work, and from the early 1960s, the magazine received a steady flow of valuable texts.

Przyrowski also admitted that some texts, even just a few years after publication, were hard to classify as science fiction, as "reality had caught up with and surpassed fantasy". He concluded: "it turns out that even in science fiction, all those extraordinary devices, machines, and apparatuses – which seemed to constitute its main attribute – are not that important. This literature endures as long as it can depict the expectations, fascinations, and anxieties of the era in which it was created".

In 1980, Izabela Stachelska included the collection in the recommended list New Books for Children and Youth in Poradnik Bibliotekarza. Repeating some information from Przyrowski, she described it as a large collection and assessed that the stories "provide a picture of the development of Polish science fiction and a broad cross-section of its themes".

In 1990, Wojtek Sedeńko briefly summarized that the anthology "presents the best stories from the 25-year history of the SF column in Młody Technik".

Writing in Choices of Pop Culture in 2015, Paweł Aleksandrowicz considered the volume to fit into the more traditional current of philosophical and abstract science fiction, addressing themes like interstellar travel and encounters with aliens.
