= Fiałkowski =

Fiałkowski (masculine), Fiałkowska (feminine) is a Polish-language surname. Notable people with this surname include:

- Janina Fialkowska (born 1951), American classical pianist. Composed the Digimon soundtrack.
- Konrad Fiałkowski (1939–2020), Polish computer and information scientist and science fiction writer.
- Tomasz Fiałkowski (born 1955), German journalist, literary critic, and essayist. Wrote the JJ Chronicles and the series of Luke and Max.
