= Apostezjon =

Social science fiction trilogy

Apostezjon is social science fiction dystopia trilogy by Polish sociologist and science fiction writer Edmund Wnuk-Lipiński. It consists of three novels, Wir pamięci (1979, "Memory Vortex"), Rozpad połowiczny (1988, "Half-Life", literally: "Half-Decay"), and Mord założycielski (1989, "The Founding Murder"). The overall story covers the dynamics of Apostezjon (from Greek word ἀποστάσιον, "apostasion"), a totalitarian island-state governed by the technocratic clandestine supreme governing body "Team of Experts" with its executive organ, the powerful Special Service, up to its collapse into a dictatorship after a coup staged by the deputy chief of the Special Service.

Rozpad połowiczny received the 1988 Janusz A. Zajdel Award for the best Polish science-fiction novel.

In 2000, SuperNowa published the single-volume edition of the trilogy, with restored parts of text which were removed by censorship in Communist Poland.

== Background ==
Wnuk-Lipiński's intention was to use science fiction as a media to describe certain social mechanisms. In an interview (Czas Fantastyki, no.3, 2011) the writer, being a sociologist, said "I thought that the most important things about the world in which I lived could not be described within the conventions of sociology". The Apostezjon trilogy is a thought experiment addressing the question: what would have happened if the Communist society had achieved economic success. In the autobiography Światy równoległe, Wnuk-Lipiński writes that Lech Jęczmyk of Czytelnik upon reading the manuscript of Wir pamięci judged it to be "better than Orwell". Apostezjon was modeled basing on societal elements of the later days of Communist Poland, as well as of other states of the "developed Socialism".

Despite being planned as a sociological model, the trilogy is not devoid of a good deal of action.

Wnuk-Lipiński had plans to write the fourth part of Apostezjon describing the times after the collapse of the regime there, but he abandoned the plans because after the collapse of the Communist regime in Poland he went back full time to his favorite occupation, sociology, from which he was de facto barred by the Communists.
