= Warsaw Comic Con =

Multi-genre fan convention in Poland

- Status: active
- Genre: Comic books, science-fiction, anime, cosplay
- Locations: Warsaw, Mazovian Voivodeship
- Country: Poland
- Inaugurated: 2017
- Organizer: Ptak Warsaw Expo
- Website: https://warsawcomiccon.pl/en/

The Warsaw Comic Con was an annual pop culture fan convention held in Warsaw, Poland. First established in 2017, it was the second largest festival of this kind in Poland, after Pyrkon, and was organized in Ptak Warsaw Expo the largest exhibition and conference centre in Central Europe.

== Events ==
The Warsaw Comic Con was dedicated to comic books, computer games, TV series, science-fiction, fantasy, anime, manga, horror and cosplay fans and enthusiasts. It took place twice a year and was divided into the Spring and the Autumn Editions. The event featured popular actors and celebrities from the world of pop culture movies, TV series, games and comics, and gave visitors the opportunity to meet actors, writers, comic book professionals, e-sport players and YouTube personalities, attend panel discussions and take part in interviews as well as offered genre-related gadgets, computer games, comic books, cosplay items, videos and various collectibles. Other attractions of the festival included cosplay competitions, music concerts, Warsaw Games Show, steel figures exhibition of comic book characters, Hollywood film props exhibition, board games area, LEGO Area, and the COBI Area for the enthusiasts of militaria.

== Locations and dates ==
Dates	Location	Official Warsaw Comic Con guests	Notes
1–4 June 2017	Ptak Warsaw Expo	Alfie Allen, Carice van Houten, Olga Fonda, Hafþór Júlíus Björnsson, Jan A.P. Kaczmarek, Melissa Ponzio, Nadia Hilker, RJ Mitte, Andrzej Pilipiuk, Katarzyna Majgier	
24–26 Nov 2017	Ptak Warsaw Expo	Pamela Anderson, Holland Roden, Michael Malarkey, Andrew Scott, Jack Gleeson, Vladimir Furdik, Daniel Portman, Gemma Whelan, Julian Glover, Maude Hirst, Kevin McNally, Trevor Stines, Henrik Holm, Sean Biggerstaff, Devon Murray, Afshan Azad, Anthony Forrest	
20–22 Apr 2018	Ptak Warsaw Expo	Daniel Gillies, Dylan Sprayberry, Manu Bennett, Michael Trevino, Trevor Stines, Richard Harmon, Andrzej Sapkowski, Kristian Nairn, Ken Stott, Martin Klebba, Hayley Law, Marlon Langeland, Kerry Ingram, Cody Saintgnue, Alex Bairma, Conan Stevens, Michelle Harrison	
26–28 Oct 2018	Ptak Warsaw Expo	Paul Wesley, John Rhys-Davies, Cara Buono, Andrew Scott, Crystal Reed, Christopher Larkin, Jason Douglas, Ian McElhinney, Eugene Simon, Jimmy Vee, Ian Whyte, Rick Cosnett, Froy Gutierrez, Nathaniel Buzolic, Jordan Connor, Adam Brown, Clive Standen, Andrzej Pilipiuk, Glenn Fabry, Simon Bisley, Michał Gołkowski, Piotr Langenfeld	
31 May-2 June 2019	Ptak Warsaw Expo	Ian Somerhalder, Paul Wesley, Marie Avgeropoulos, Holland Roden, Billy Boyd, Casey Cott, Tyler Hoechlin, Carice van Houten, Stefan Kapičić, Cara Buono, Tom Wlaschiha, Royd Tolkien	

== See also ==
- Science fiction and fantasy in Poland
- International Festival of Comics and Games in Łódź
- Pyrkon
