= The Final Circle of Paradise =

1965 novel by Arkady and Boris Strugatsky

- Cover from DAW Books edition
- Author: Arkady and Boris Strugatsky
- Original title: Хищные вещи века
- Language: Russian
- Genre: Science fiction
- Publisher: DAW Books in US, originally published in the USSR 1965
- Publication date: 1965
- Publication place: Soviet Union
- English publication date: 1976
- Media type: Print

The Final Circle of Paradise (Russian: Хищные вещи века, romanized: Khishnye veshi veka, lit. 'Predatory Things of the Century') is a science fiction novel by Arkady and Boris Strugatsky. It was first published in the Soviet Union in 1965, and the first English edition, translated by Leonid Renen, was published by DAW books in 1976. The original Russian language title is a line from Andrei Voznesensky's poem "Beatnik's Monologue. Machine Riot" (1961).

== Commentary ==
The novel belongs to the early period of Strugatsky's activities, while they were faithful followers of communist ideology.

The main idea of the novel is that the consumerist society causes human degradation and degeneration.

A related major idea of the novel is the idea of "makeshift evil stuff", something alike to cooking potent drugs (or chemical weapon poisons, or explosives) from the components that are freely purchased in the "home chemistry" part of the supermarket store. These items are the "predatory things", thus the original Russian title.

In early 2000s, Boris Strugatsky, who was still alive, commented on the old book to his Internet fans. He said that, even though sci-fi writers always try to predict some features of the future, most of their attempts fail; but most of the predictions in Predatory Things of the Century are just plain "direct hits" since most of them came to reality within 40–50 years, especially in rich Western countries and also to some degree in Russia.

For instance, the book predicted raves under the name of "shakery" (Russian: drozhka). The book predicted life-threatening extreme entertainment under the name of "fisherists" (Russian: rybar, an intentionally incorrect version of rybak, which means "fisherman").

The novel is a sequel of sorts to the earlier Strugatsky novels Space Apprentice (1962) and The Way to Amalthea (1960). At the end of Space Apprentice, the flight engineer Ivan Zhilin gives up space travel for Earth, where "the most important things are to make the Solar System a better place for the young people of the world. The Final Circle of Paradise takes place a little less than ten years after Space Apprentice, in a large seaside resort city somewhere in Europe with an abandoned subway. Meanwhile, he has been working for the security service of the World Council, an international governing body similar to but far more powerful than the United Nations. A few years earlier, Zhilin fought as part of an international brigade to put down a fascist uprising in the same city in which the story is set, which is reminiscent of the 1930s Spanish Civil War except that the communists won unlike in Spain. That was supposedly one of the "final" wars before universal disarmament in which the last of the fascists were finally defeated. Like other Strugatsky novels, the setting is an internationalized future of advanced technology and world peace. There is no Iron Curtain, Cold War, or arms race. Most of the world is permanently at peace, with the rest on the verge of being forcibly demilitarized.

== Plot summary ==
Ivan Zhilin, posing as a writer working on a novel, visits a seaside resort city in an unnamed country called the Land of Fools to investigate a series of mysterious deaths. Zhilin's role as an undercover agent becomes apparent to the reader only gradually and is not brought into the open until the final chapters of the novel.

While being given a tour of the city, a tourism official tells Zhilin that he will get no work done, as he will be distracted by the "twelve circles of paradise" found in the city. They include the "fisherists", who provide thrill seekers with situations of extreme and potentially fatal terror; the "shivers", which electronically induce pleasurable dreams to large crowds of people; and the Society of Patrons of Arts, which procures priceless works of art and ritualistically destroys them. The city's culture has become utterly decadent, the product of an age of universal affluence. Zhilin refers to it as "the age of abundance" in which the highest priority is placed on orgiastic pleasure and staving off boredom to the neglect of culture, education, and scientific progress. The Marxist perspective is expressed in a scene of Zhilin's scolding rebuke directed at a Third World rebel leader "revolutionary" who professes his amazement by and envy of the city's opulence while he gorges himself in an eatery:

The great revolutionaries would not have accepted your maxim, now you are free – enjoy yourselves. They spoke otherwise: now you are free – work. After all, they never fought for abundance for the belly, they were interested in abundance for the soul and the mind.

The ultimate expression of the decadence of the city's culture is the mysterious "sleg", which is apparently responsible for the deaths that Zhilin is investigating. At first, Zhilin believes it to be some sort of narcotic that is distributed by gangsters with secret laboratories and trafficking networks. Zhilin progressively finds clues that lead him to Peck Xenai, his former classmate and the last surviving member of his international unit that fought the fascists some years before. Peck, however, is physically ravaged by alcoholism, and the use of "sleg" and does not even recognize Zhilin when he finds him. Zhilin succeeds in getting a "sleg" from Peck in the form of a small silver electronic component. What Zhilin finds when he plugs the "sleg" into his radio receiver and lies in the bathtub causes him to rethink the entire situation.

"Sleg" turns out to be a way of generating an artificial reality that is significantly more intense than normal reality to the point that there is virtually no comparison between our reality and that of the "sleg." People become addicted to it and spend increasing amounts of time unconscious in their bathtubs until it kills them by nervous exhaustion or brain hemorrhages. That is "the final circle of paradise". It also turns out that the "sleg" is not the work of gangsters or a secret laboratory but is a common electronic component that can be used in an unexpected way. If "sleg" were to become widely known, Zhilin concludes, nothing would stop it from being used by millions the world over. Zhilin, who struggles himself not to use it a second time, concludes that "sleg" represents "the end of progress." He foresees humanity as a whole entering the illusory reality, which will eventually destroy it.

At the end of Space Apprentice, Zhilin began to devote his life to making the Solar System a better place for young people struggling to find purpose in the world. At the end of this story, he leaves his work with the World Council to fight "the last war – the most bloodless and most difficult for its soldiers" making life worth living for the millions caught unprepared in an age of affluence so that they will never need anything like "sleg".
