= Limes inferior =

1982 novel by Janusz Zajdel

- First edition
- Author: Janusz A. Zajdel
- Cover artist: Kazimierz Hałajkiewicz
- Language: Polish
- Genre: Science fiction
- Publisher: Iskry
- Publication date: 1982
- Publication place: Poland
- Media type: Print
- Pages: 226
- ISBN: 83-7054-116-X
- OCLC: 314209372
- LC Class: PG7185.A364 L56 1997

Limes inferior (Latin for lower limit) is a social science fiction dystopian novel written in 1982 by the Polish author Janusz A. Zajdel. Limes inferior, one of Zajdel's best-known works, is a dystopia showing a grim vision of a future society resulting from a merger of the two systems competing at the time - communism and capitalism. It is a seemingly free society, which is in fact tightly controlled through a system of electronic biometric ID cards (Keys), censored media and other forms of social control.

It was recognized as the best science fiction novel in Poland in 1982.

== Setting ==
The story is set in a fictional 'Argoland'. All citizens in Argoland are divided into 7 social classes (numbered from 0 to 6) based on their IQ. 'Zeroes' are the top, governing class. The class of a citizen determines what job he gets, and his pay ('red, green and yellow points'). Only people with class between 0 and 4 get any jobs, any promotion is depending on the class more than achievement. This is further true because the economy seems to be centrally controlled government run socialism, that is private property is limited and small private enterprises operate only on the fringes of the general economy.

'Argoland' has an awkward monetary system - its currency are green, red and yellow points. Their value is different - red points are almost valueless - only basic items like basic food can be bought for them, green points have a bit higher value and only yellow points have real value. Conversely, only employed are paid any yellow points, the more the higher their class. That means only those with class over 4 (and practically 3 because there is a shortage of jobs for class 4 and no jobs for lower classes) can get any yellow points officially. Therefore, a black exchange market for points flourishes.

The 'points' are kept on a 'Key' which serves as an electronic wallet. The Key displays the class of its bearer and its other functions are activated by owner's touch on a built-in fingerprint reader. The Key is similar to modern PDAs serving as an ID card, credit card, a watch, a calculator and a biometric reader.

Argoland is a city-state, located on the shores of lake Tibigan. The countryside is said to be uninhabited with farms operated by robots. The novel alludes that the whole humanity lives in such cities and leaving a city is not possible (vehicles used by the citizens of Argoland cease to operate at the city borders). Travel between city-states is possible but restricted and therefore not available to general population. However, people at large seem not interested in leaving their city being sure that life in other city-states is exactly the same as in theirs.

Official government or economic structure of Argoland is not discussed in the book. Religion of any kind is also totally absent. However many aspects of social control like stupidators added to cheap food to keep lower classes under control, tracing people through their 'points' transactions etc. are discussed in detail.

== Plot summary ==
The hero, Adi Cherryson, also known as Sneer (named after one of Zajdel's fellow science fiction writers Adam Wiśniewski-Snerg), is a lifter who "helps" people cheat during the computer controlled IQ exams by giving them the correct answers through a micro-radio communicator or taking the exam for them. Sneer, who is officially only a level 4, could easily become the top level 0, but he prefers his medium level which doesn't attract much attention. In addition to lifters a whole gallery of black market figures is presented - there are downers (who use their low IQ to provide realistic 'stupid' answers for those who want to keep their class artificially low like Sneer), chameleons (black market point dealers), key-makers (providing all sorts of illegal, special purpose Keys).

The story starts when Sneer is questioned by an undercover police agent on the street and unintentionally reveals his intelligence by his answers (or so Sneer thinks). As a result, a few hours later his Key is locked and he is told to report to a testing station for an IQ test. Knowing that in such situation "electro-hipnosis" is used to prevent subjects from hiding their true intelligence, he solicits help of a "downer". He finds a suitable specialist through another "lifter" - Karl Pron.

He goes to the testing station with the "downer", who takes his Key and goes inside, leaving Sneer waiting outside. A few minutes later Sneer sees the "downer" arrested.

Without his Key he faces the reality of not having a shelter and being able to even find anything to eat without points. Wandering through the city, he sees some of the misery of life in Argoland he didn't notice before. Finally, he meets mysterious Alice, who gives him shelter and some mysterious clues about a singer and a song about the lake Tibigan.

In the morning he meets the "downer" and learns how he secured his release through a ruse - he reported Sneer's Key as found on the street. Sneer goes to the central police station and retrieves his Key, but the experience makes him uncomfortable, and he starts to look at his world in a different way. He visits his parents and an old friend, a doctor, revealing to the reader the history of this world and some further facts about it. He also tries to listen to the song Alice told him about and discovers that theoretical freedom of press is in fact a fiction as some songs etc. can be prohibited.

Meanwhile, Sneer is hired by a government official (a 'zero') to monitor the scientific lab dealing with Keys - The Key Institute. Working undercover as a doorman, Sneer discovers to his amazement that the Key Institute that should know everything about the Keys, having designed them, is in fact studying them as if they were an alien object.

Meanwhile, his "lifter" friend Karl Pron tests a new counterfeited Key, which gives the owner an unlimited number of yellow points. This Key was ordered by the group of '0's – who in fact work in the lab on which Sneer is now spying upon.

When Sneer obtains the super Key, he is taken to the meeting with top officials of the local government, where he learns that the social system of 'Argoland' is, in fact, an experiment imposed upon the humanity by the Aliens. The 'over-zeroes' form a ruling class, which suppresses dissent fearful of the Aliens but permits all kinds of irregularities which they see as preserving the human nature of people.

The end is largely mystical, but it suggests that, with the help of Alice, Sneer succeeds in saving humanity, though it is not clear exactly how he achieves that.

== Interpretation ==
As with much utopian and dystopian fiction in the former Soviet bloc countries, where open criticism of the government was dangerous and subject to censorship, this book was interpreted by many as in fact a criticism of the system disguised as an SF novel to evade censorship (the "aliens", who are military superpower and are simultaneously enforcing a social system invented by them and thought by them to be the best one for the entire universe, actually look strongly, from such a description made in the book, like the Soviets themselves). However, it can be interpreted more broadly as a novel on how would a system resulting from a mix or convergence of the main systems then competing - communism and capitalism - look like. Some argue that many of the author's visions - for example possibility of totalitarian control on a large scale through digital systems without tracking any single individual in particular - can be seen as existing in the current world.

Many aspects of the 'Argoland' society, seemingly fictional to the book's Western readers, represented an everyday situation in communist countries. For example, in the shortage economy, luxury goods were available from a state-run chain of shops (like Pewex) selling products only for hard-to-obtain foreign currency.
