= Edmund Wnuk-Lipiński =

Sociology professor and science fiction author (1944-2015)

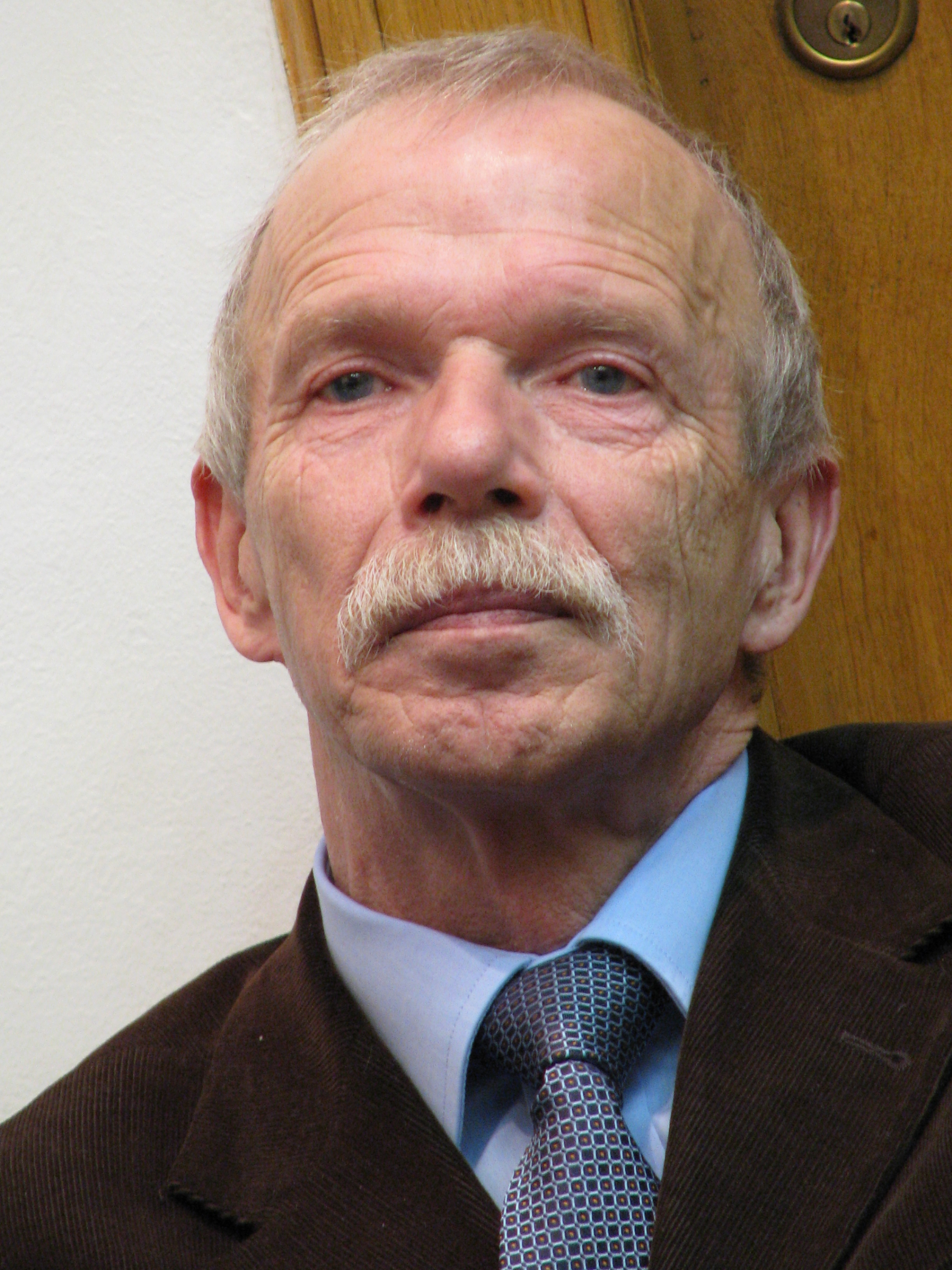
Edmund Wnuk-Lipiński, Warsaw, April 17, 2008

Edmund Wnuk-Lipiński (4 May 1944 – 4 January 2015) was a Polish sociologist, political scientist, and writer. Wnuk-Lipiński was born in Sucha.

== Scholar ==
A professor of sociology, he was the founder and first head of the Polish Academy of Sciences' Institute of Political Studies, and rector of the Warsaw-based Collegium Civitas. He was a fellow at the Institute of Human Sciences in Vienna, the University of Notre Dame, and Wissenschaftskolleg in Berlin, as well as a member of the Polish National Council for Civil Service and the National Council for European Integration. From 1999 he taught at the College of Europe (Natolin campus).

== Writer ==
Apart from his scientific activities, Wnuk-Lipiński was also a successful author of science-fiction novels and novellas. He was also one of the precursors of the social science fiction genre in Poland (along with Janusz Zajdel). The middle part of his Apostezjon social fiction dystopia trilogy (Wir pamięci, Rozpad połowiczny, Mord założycielski) received the 1988 Janusz A. Zajdel Award for the best Polish science-fiction novel.

== Recognition ==
In 2001 he was awarded Commander's Cross of the Order of Polonia Restituta.

== Selected works ==
- Praca i wypoczynek w budżecie czasu (Balancing work and leisure), Wrocĺaw 1972
- Czas wolny – współczesność i perspektywy (Leisure – Contemporary and future issues), Warszawa 1975
- Rozumienie kultury (Understanding culture), Warszawa 19754
- Budżet czasu – struktura społeczna – polityka społeczna (Time budget – social structure -social policy), Wrocław 1980
- Equality and inequality under socialism – Poland and Hungary compared, London 1983 (Co-author and Co-editor with Tomas Kolosi)
- Nierówności i upośledzenia w świadomości społecznej (Inequalities and Deprivations in Social Consciousness), Warszawa 1987, (editor and co-author)
- Grupy i więzi społeczne w monocentrycznym społeczeństwie masowym (Groups and social bonds in a monocentric mass society), Warsaw 1990 (Editor and co-author)
- Non-market economies and inequalities in health, in "Social Science and Medicine", vol.31, No. 8, 1990, London, (Co–author and Co-editor with Raymond Illsley)
- Polacy '88 – Dynamika konfliktu a szanse reform (Poles '88 – Dynamics of conflict and chances for reforms), Warszawa 1989 (Co-author)
- Polacy '90 – Konflikty i zmiana (Poles '90 – Conflicts and change), Warsaw 1991 (Coauthor and Co-editor)
- Rozpad połowiczny – Szkice z socjologii transformacji ustrojowej (Half-life – Essays in the sociology of systemic transformation), Warszawa, 1992
- After Communism. A multidisciplinary approach to radical social change, Warsaw 1995 (Editor and Co-author)
- Elity w Polsce, w Rosji i na Węgrzech. Wymiana czy reprodukcja? (Elites in Poland, Russia and Hungary. Circulation or reproduction?) (Co-author and Co-editor with Ivan Szelenyi and Don Treiman), Warszawa, 1995 (The English version was published in a special issue of “Theory and Society”, October 1995)
- Demokratyczna rekonstrukcja. Z socjologii radykalnej zmiany społecznej, (Democratic reconstruction. The sociology of radical social change), PWN, Warszawa 1996
- Values and radical social change. Comparing the Polish and South-African experience (Co-author and Editor), Warsaw 1998
- Pierwsza dekada niepodległości. Próba socjologicznej syntezy. (The first decade of independence. A tentative sociological synthesis) (Co-author and Editor), Institute of Political Studies, Warsaw, 2001
- Granice wolności. Pamiętnik polskiej transformacji (The limits of freedom. The diary of Polish transformation), Wyd. Scholar, Warszawa 2002
- Świat międzyepoki. Globalizacja – demokracja – państwo narodowe (A world between epochs. Globalization – democracy – nation state), Znak, Kraków, 2004
- Socjologia życia publicznego (The sociology of public life), Scholar, Warszawa, First edition – 2005, second edition – 2008 (this book is translated into Russian: Mysl Publishers, Moscow)
- Democracy under stress. The global crisis and beyond (co-author and co-editor), Barbara Budrich Publishers, Opladen – Berlin – Farmington Hills MI 2012.
