= Adam Hollanek =

Polish writer (1922–1998)

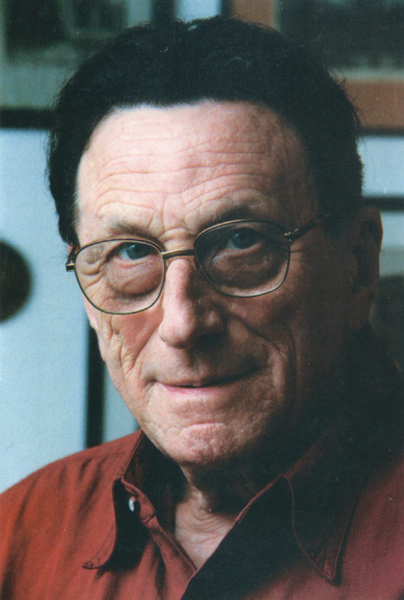
- Adam Hollanek in 1997
- Born: 4 October 1922; Lwów, Poland (now Ukraine)
- Died: 28 July 1998 (aged 75); Zakopane, Poland
- Writing career
- Period: 1945–1998
- Genres: science fiction, science, poetry

Adam Hollanek (born 4 October 1922 in Lwów, died 28 July 1998 in Zakopane) was a Polish science fiction writer and journalist, and founder of the Fantastyka magazine, the first science-fiction-oriented monthly magazine in the whole Eastern Bloc, established in 1982. He was Fantastyka's editor-in-chief between 1982 and 1990, and published regular essays in the magazine until his death in 1998.

== Honours ==
- Polish Academy of Sciences Award (1978)
- Prix Européen de Science Fiction (1986)
- Special World SF Prof. Organisation President's Award (1987)

== Works ==
=== Novels ===
- Katastrofa na "Słońcu Antarktydy" (1958)
- Zbrodnia wielkiego człowieka (1960)
- Muzyka dla was, chłopcy (1975)
- Jeszcze trochę pożyć (1980)
- Olśnienie (1982)
- Kochać bez skóry (1983)
- Ja z Łyczakowa
- Księżna z Florencji (1988)
- Pacałycha – (1996)
- Mudrahela: Tragiczna opowiesc lwowska (1997)

=== Short story collections ===
- Plaża w Europie (1967)
- Ukochany z Księżyca (1979; short stories: Ukochany z Księżyca, Jak koń trojański, Punkt, Aparat też chce żyć, Oni już tu są, Łazarzu wstań)
- Bandyci i policjanci (1982)
- Skasować drugie ja (1989; short stories Każdy może być Faustem, Skasować drugie ja, Jak koń trojański, Nie można go spalić, Muzyka dla was, chłopcy)

=== Popular science books ===
- Węgiel nasze czarne złoto (1954)
- Niewidzialne armie kapitulują (1954)
- Sprzedam śmierć (1961)
- Skóra jaszczurcza (1965)
- Lewooki cyklop (1966)
- Nieśmiertelność na zamówienie (1973)
- Sposób na niewiadome (1978)

=== Essays ===
- Geniusz na miarę epoki ("Fantastyka" 3/86)
- A jednak romantyzm ("Fantastyka" 2/88)

=== Poetry ===
- Pokuty (1987)
- Ja - kon, ja Zyd (1995)
- Landszafty (1996)
