= Adam Wiśniewski-Snerg =

Polish writer

- Born: 1 January 1937; Płock, Poland
- Died: 30 August 1995 (aged 58); Warsaw, Poland
- Occupation: Writer
- Writing career
- Period: 1968–1995
- Genre: Science fiction

Adam Wiśniewski-Snerg (1 January 1937 – 30 August 1995) was a Polish science fiction author, born in Płock, Poland.

Although unpopular during his life, after his suicide he became recognized as one of the most significant authors of Polish SF.

His novel Robot was first published in English in 2021 in a translation by Tomasz Mirkowicz, who died in 2003. He was the prototype of Sneer, the main character of Limes inferior, one of the novels by Janusz A. Zajdel.

== Publications ==
- Robot ("Robot") (1973)
- Według łotra ("According, to the Thief") (Wydawnictwo Literackie, Kraków 1978)
- Nagi cel ("The Naked Target") (1980)
- Arka ("The Ark") (Czytelnik, Warszawa 1989)
- Jednolita teoria czasoprzestrzeni ("The Uniform Theory of the Spacetime") (1990)
  - A non-science fiction book, in which the author presents his vision of the "General Theory of Everything", i.e., the unifying theory for all physical aspects of the universe. This theory was not taken seriously by physicists.

Posthumous

- "ORO" ("ORO") (Amber, Warszawa 1997)
- "Trzecia cywilizacja" ("The Third Civilization") (C&T, Toruń 1998)
