= Jacek Sawaszkiewicz =

Polish writer (1947–1999)

- Born: 10 September 1947; Szczecin, Poland
- Died: 11 June 1999 (aged 51)
- Occupation: Writer
- Writing career
- Genres: Science fiction, satire

Jacek Sawaszkiewicz (10 September 1947 – 11 June 1999) was a Polish science fiction writer and satirist. He was also a contributor to the satirical magazine Karuzela and Polish radio broadcast Polskie Radio Szczecin.

He made his debut with a story "Sanatorium" (Karuzela, 1972). His book debut was Czekając (1978). Sawaszkiewicz is known for his social science fiction Kronika Akaszy series.

== Collections ==
- (1978) Czekając (Wydawnictwo Poznańskie)
- (1978) Mój tatko (Iskry)
- (1979) Przybysz; Wyznanie; Potestas (Nasza Księgarnia)
- (1980) Admirał Douglas Westrex; Kariera Johna Stoffhansenna; Cerebrak; Manekin (Nasza Księgarnia)
- (1983) Mistyfikacje; Raport; Guzik; Pożegnanie; Życie rodzinne; Prawda (Nasza Księgarnia)
- (1983) Tatko i ja (Krajowa Agencja Wydawnicza)
- (1985) Z moim tatkiem ([opowiadania satyryczne] Krajowa Agencja Wydawnicza)
- (1985) Między innymi makabra (Glob)
- (1986) Wahadło (Glob)
- (1988) Mój tatko i cała reszta (Krajowa Agencja Wydawnicza)

== Novels ==
- (1979) Sukcesorzy (Wydawnictwo Poznańskie)
- (1980) Katharsis (Iskry)
- (1982) Eskapizm (Wydawnictwo Poznańskie)
- (1981) Kronika Akaszy. Inicjacja (Wydawnictwo Poznańskie)
- (1982) Kronika Akaszy. Skorupa astralna (Wydawnictwo Poznańskie)
- (1984) Kronika Akaszy. Metempsychoza (Wydawnictwo Poznańskie)
- (1986) Kronika Akaszy. Powtórka z Apokalipsy (Wydawnictwo Poznańskie)
- (1986) Stan zagrożenia (Wydawnictwo Poznańskie)
- (1988) Na tle kosmicznej otchłani (Krajowa Agencja Wydawnicza)

== Bibliography ==
- Leksykon polskiej literatury fantastycznonaukowej - Andrzej Niewiadowski, Antoni Smuszkiewicz, Wydawnictwo Poznańskie, Poznań 1990, ISBN 83-210-0892-5
- Polish Literary Bibliography

== See also ==
- List of Polish writers
- List of science fiction writers
