= Lech Jęczmyk =

Polish writer and critic (1936–2023)

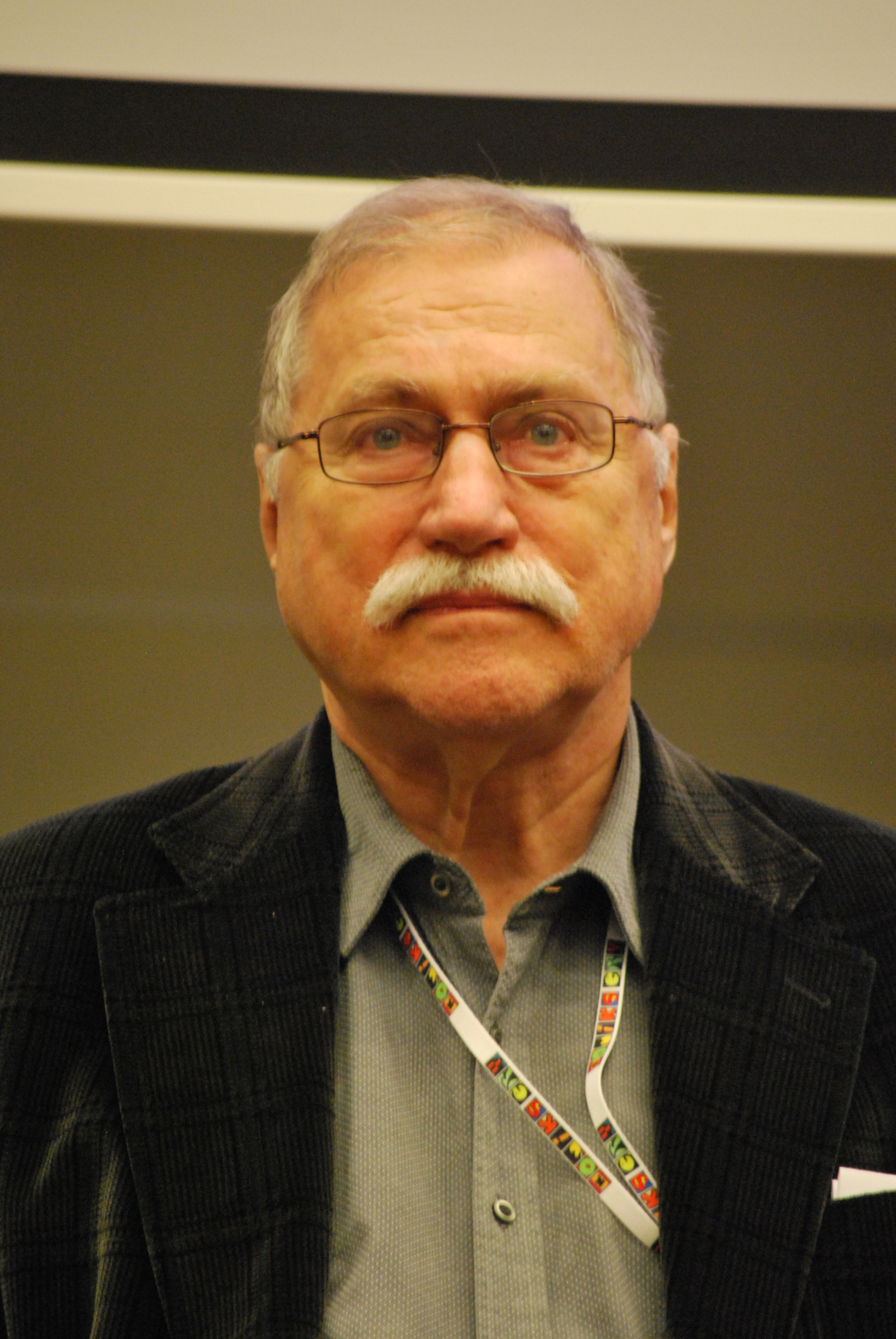
Jęczmyk in 2012

Lech Jęczmyk (10 January 1936 – 17 July 2023) was a Polish publicist, essayist, writer and translator. He was a critic of science-fiction, chief editor of Nowa Fantastyka from 1990 to 1992, and editor of several science-fiction series and anthologies.

His essays were collected in:

- Eseje (2005)
- Trzy końce historii czyli Nowe Średniowiecze (2006)

Jęczmyk died on 17 July 2023, at the age of 87.

== Sources ==
- (in Polish) Lech Jęczmyk in Encyklopedia Solidarności
