= Wiktor Żwikiewicz =

Polish science fiction author

- Born: March 19, 1950 (age 76); Bydgoszcz, Poland
- Occupation: Writer
- Writing career
- Genre: Hard science fiction

Wiktor Żwikiewicz (born 19 March 1950) is a Polish writer of science fiction.

== Biography ==
in the 1970s and 1980s he published a number of short stories, collected in four anthologies, as well as for novels. He also authored two theatre plays. His works have been translated to Bulgarian, Czech, German, Russian, Slovakian and Hungarian languages.

At a later point in his life, he became a homeless person. By 2011 he was living in a social housing in Bydgoszcz. He suffered a stroke in 2016.

== Works ==
He has been called a "legend" of Polish science fiction.

In addition to being a writer, he is also an artist. He usually illustrated the covers of his books himself, and provided cover art for books of several other author.

His style of writing is rather unique and may be viewed as a bit cryptic. He often explores technical fantasmagory and poetical descriptions of his very own. He can be considered a visionary of the Internet in the communistic Polish People's Republic hidden behind the Iron Curtain; see "Delirium in Tharsys" below. His stories resolve around the contact with other civilizations, human self-evolution, and the biocenosis on the cosmic scale.

One of his novels, "Delirium in Tharsys" (1987), describes the Earth at the decline of the human civilization. The mother Earth seems to take the vengeance on humanity and make room for newly evolved species, although nobody knows what is really going on. Around one can only see a genetic warfare at full throtle. The special operation forces of a posthuman specie residing on the Moon (Lovers of Luna) are sent to help their human creators in the final days. The only survived trooper from Moon becomes a spectator of total retreat of last humans pushed at the verge of madness. The question arises if posthuman entities are not more empathic towards humanity than humanity itself. Readers may find the spirit of doom and the vision of evolution of humanity slightly similar to that in Blindsight and Echopraxia by Peter Watts.

=== Novels ===
- Second autumn (Polish: Druga jesień 1982)
- Imago (1985)
- A ballad about the curse (Polish: Ballada o przekleństwie 1986)
- Delirium in Tharsys (Polish: Delirium w Tharsys 1987)
