= Social science fiction =

Subgenre of science fiction which explores society and human interactions

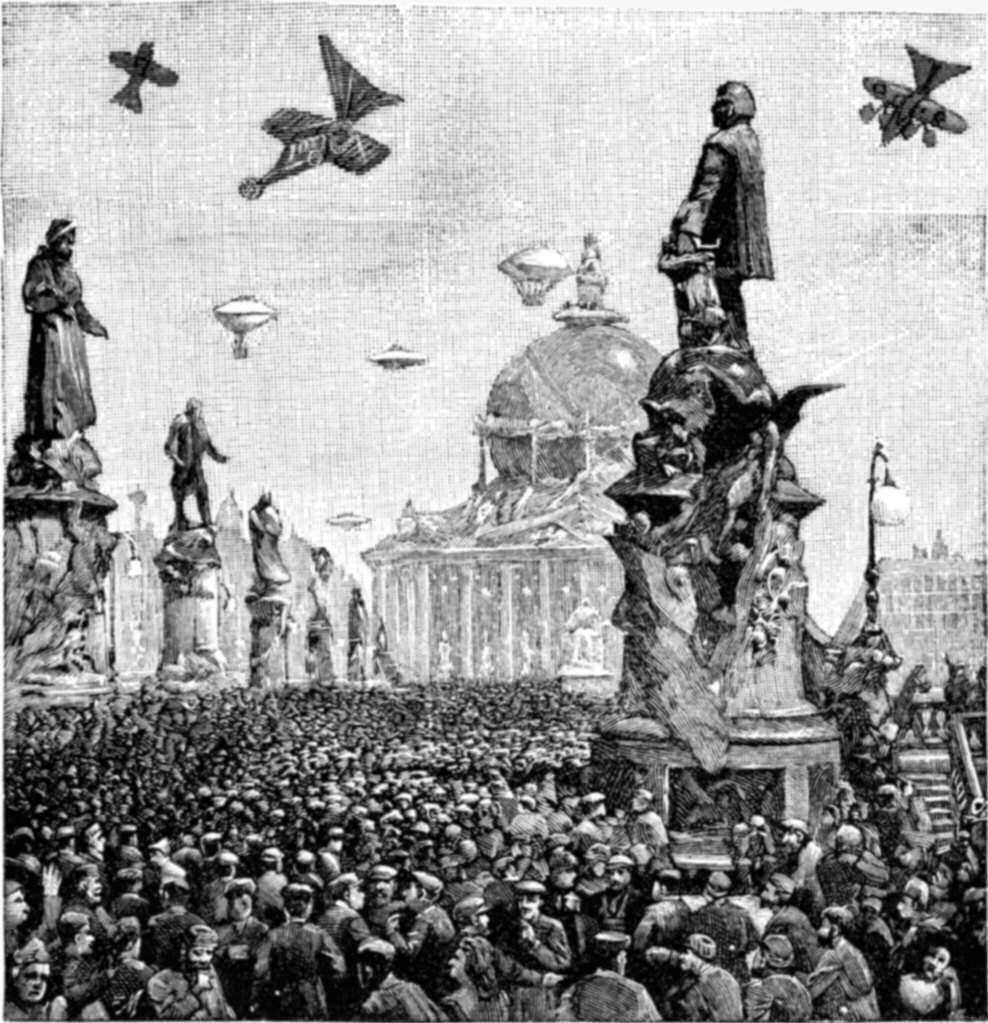
A depiction of a futuristic Paris street scene, where flying crafts soar above crowds.

Social science fiction or sociological science fiction is a subgenre of science fiction, usually (but not necessarily) soft science fiction, concerned less with technology or space opera and more with speculation about society. Speculation about human behavior and interactions through an anthropological lens is also a key feature of many works.

Exploration of fictional societies is a significant aspect of social science fiction, allowing it to make predictions (The Time Machine, 1895; The Final Circle of Paradise, 1965), offer precautionary warnings (Brave New World, 1932; Nineteen Eighty-Four, 1949; Childhood's End, Fahrenheit 451, 1953), to criticize the contemporary world (Gulliver's Travels, 1726; the works of Alexander Gromov, 1995–present), to present solutions to social ills (Walden Two, Freedom™), to portray alternative societies (World of the Noon), to share utopias (William Morris's News from Nowhere), and to examine the implications of ethical principles, as for example in the works of Sergei Lukyanenko. More contemporary examples include The Lobster (2015), directed by Greek filmmaker Yorgos Lanthimos, and The Platform (2019).

Social fiction is a broad term to describe any work of speculative fiction that features social commentary (as opposed to, say, hypothetical technology) in the foreground. Social science fiction is a subgenre thereof, where social commentary (cultural or political) takes place in a sci-fi universe. Utopian and dystopian fiction is a classic, polarized genre of social science fiction, although most works of science fiction can be interpreted as having social commentary of some kind or other as an important feature. It is not uncommon, therefore, for a sci-fi work to be labeled as social sci-fi as well as numerous other categories.

== In English ==
Thomas More's book Utopia (1516) represents an early example of the genre. Another early classic writer, Jonathan Swift, penned critical views on current society—his most famous work, Gulliver's Travels (1726), is an example of a novel that is partially social science fiction (with such classic sci-fi elements as pioneering in strange new worlds and experimenting with variations of the human anatomy) and partially high fantasy (e.g., fantastical species that satirize various sectors of society).

One of the writers who used science fiction to explore the sociology of near-future topics was H. G. Wells, with his classic The Time Machine (1895) revealing the human race diverging into separate branches of Elois and Morlocks as a consequence of class inequality: a happy pastoral society of Elois preyed upon by the Morlocks but yet needing them to keep their world functioning—a thinly veiled criticism of capitalist society, where the exploiter class, or the bourgeoisie, is symbolized by the useless, frivolous Elois, and the exploited working class, or the proletariat, is represented by the subterranean-dwelling, malnourished Morlocks. Wells' The Sleeper Awakes (1899, 1910) predicted the spirit of the 20th century: technically advanced, undemocratic and bloody. Next to prognoses of the future of society if current social problems persisted, as well as depictions of alien societies that are exaggerated versions of ours (exemplified by The War of the Worlds of 1897), Wells also heavily criticized the then-popular concept of vivisection, experimental "psychiatry" and research that was done for the purpose of restructuring the human mind and memory (clearly emphasized in The Island of Doctor Moreau, 1896).

In the U.S., the trend of science fiction away from gadgets and space opera, and toward speculation about the human condition was championed in pulp magazines of the 1940s. Prominent authors included Robert A. Heinlein and Isaac Asimov, who invented the term "social science fiction" to describe his own work.

Utopian fiction eventually gave birth to a negative and often more cynical genre, known as dystopian fiction: Aldous Huxley's "negative utopia" Brave New World (1932), as well as Animal Farm (1945) and Nineteen Eighty-Four (1949) by George Orwell. "The thought-destroying force" of McCarthyism influenced Ray Bradbury's Fahrenheit 451 (1953). The Chrysalids (1955) by John Wyndham explored the society of several telepathic children in a world hostile to such differences. Robert Sheckley studied polar civilizations of criminal and stability in his 1960 novel The Status Civilization.

The new wave of social science fiction began with the 1960s, when authors such as Harlan Ellison, Brian Aldiss and Frank Herbert wrote novels and stories that reflected real-world political developments and ecological issues, but also experimented in creating hypothetical societies of the future or of parallel populated planets. Ellison's main theme was the protest against increasing militarism. Kurt Vonnegut wrote Slaughterhouse-Five (1969), which used the science-fiction storytelling device of time-travel to explore anti-war, moral, and sociological themes. Frederik Pohl's Gateway series (1977–2004) combined social science fiction with hard science fiction. Modern exponents of social science fiction in the Campbellian/Heinlein tradition include L. Neil Smith who wrote both The Probability Broach (1981) and Pallas, which dealt with alternative "sideways in time" futures and what a libertarian society would look like. He shares Robert A. Heinlein's conception individualism and libertarianism, in the tradition of Ayn Rand.

Kim Stanley Robinson explored different models of the future in his Three Californias Trilogy (1984, 1988, 1990).

Doris Lessing won the 2007 Nobel Prize for literature. Although known mostly for her mainstream works, she wrote numerous works of social science fiction, including Memoirs of a Survivor (1974), Briefing for a Descent into Hell (1971), and the Canopus in Argos series (1974–1983).

Examples of young adult dystopian fiction include The Hunger Games (2008) by Suzanne Collins, The House of the Scorpion (2002) by Nancy Farmer, Divergent (2011) by Veronica Roth, The Maze Runner (2009) by James Dashner, and Delirium (2011) by Lauren Oliver.

Some movies speculate about human behavior and interactions when people are placed in extreme and strange environment like Cube (1997), Cube Zero (2004), Cube 2: Hypercube (2002) or Platform (2019). Ted Chiang's short story, "Story of Your Life" was adapted into the movie Arrival (2016) and focuses on a linguist who learns how to communicate with aliens.

Star Trek is a notable example of a popular TV show that shows the characters interacting with many different societies, to provide political and social commentary on contemporary societal issues. Doctor Who is another example of a popular TV show that showcases ethical and societal issues through social science fiction.

== In Polish ==
The genre has been very popular in Poland.

== Examples by decade ==
=== Pre-1940s ===
- Thomas More, Utopia (1516)
- Jonathan Swift, Gulliver's Travels (1726)
- Edward Bulwer-Lytton, Vril, the Power of the Coming Race (1871)
- Samuel Butler, Erewhon (1872)
- H. G. Wells, The Time Machine (1895)
- Edward Bellamy, Looking Backward: 2000-1887 (1888)
- William Morris, News from Nowhere (1890)
- Yevgeny Zamyatin, We (1924)
- Aldous Huxley, Brave New World (1932)

=== 1940s ===
- Karin Boye, Kallocain (1940)
- Robert A. Heinlein, If This Goes On— (1940)
- Isaac Asimov, Nightfall (1941)
- Isaac Asimov, The Foundation series (1942–1993)
- Robert A. Heinlein, Beyond This Horizon (1942)
- George Orwell, Animal Farm (1945)
- B. F. Skinner, Walden Two (1948)
- George R. Stewart, Earth Abides (1949)
- George Orwell, Nineteen Eighty-Four (1949)

=== 1950s ===
- Ray Bradbury, The Martian Chronicles (1950)
- Ray Bradbury, Fahrenheit 451 (1953)
- Alfred Bester, The Demolished Man (1953)
- Jack Finney, The Body Snatchers (1954)

=== 1960s ===
- Robert A. Heinlein, Stranger in a Strange Land (1961)
- Kurt Vonnegut, Cat's Cradle (1963)
- Ursula K. Le Guin, Hainish Cycle (1964-2017)
- Boris and Arkady Strugatsky, The Final Circle of Paradise (1965)
- Frank Herbert, Dune (1965)
- Philip K. Dick, Do Androids Dream of Electric Sheep? (1968)

=== 1970s ===
- Ira Levin, This Perfect Day (1970)
- Boris and Arkady Strugatsky, Roadside Picnic (1972)
- Stephen King (writing as Richard Bachman), The Long Walk (1979)
- Doris Lessing, Canopus in Argos (1979-1983)

=== 1980s ===
- Ursula K. Le Guin, Always Coming Home (1985)
- Orson Scott Card, Ender's Game (1985)
- Iain M. Banks, The Culture series (1987-2012)
- Sherri S. Tepper, The Gate to Women's Country (1988)

=== 1990s ===
- Octavia E. Butler, Parable of the Sower (1993)
- Lois Lowry, The Giver (1993)
- José Saramago, Blindness (1995)
- Andrew Niccol, Gattaca (1997)
- Alexander Gromov, St. Vitus' Minuet, (1997)
- Ted Chiang, Story of Your Life (1998)

=== 2000s ===
- Malorie Blackman, The Noughts & Crosses series (2001-2021)
- Nancy Farmer, The House of the Scorpion (2002)
- Robert J. Sawyer - Neanderthal Parallax (2002-2003)
- Margaret Atwood, Oryx and Crake (2003)
- James Howard Kunstler, World Made by Hand (2008)
- Suzanne Collins, The Hunger Games (2008-2010)
- James Dashner, The Maze Runner (2009)
- Stephen King, Under the Dome (2009)

=== 2010s-present ===
- Renee Gladman – The Ravicka series (2010-2017)
- Veronica Roth, Divergent (2011)
- Lauren Oliver, Delirium (2011)
- Jeff Vandermeer, Borne (2017)
- Jon Bois, 17776 (2017)

== See also ==
- Anthropological science fiction
- Apocalyptic and post-apocalyptic science fiction
- Climate Fiction
- Cyberpunk
- Design fiction
- Fable
- Feminist science fiction
- Genre fiction
- Libertarian science fiction
- Science fiction awards
- Social thriller
- Social science fiction in Poland
- Social science fiction writers
- Soft science fiction
- Speculative Fiction
