= Konrad Fiałkowski =

Polish engineer, scientist, and writer (1939–2020)

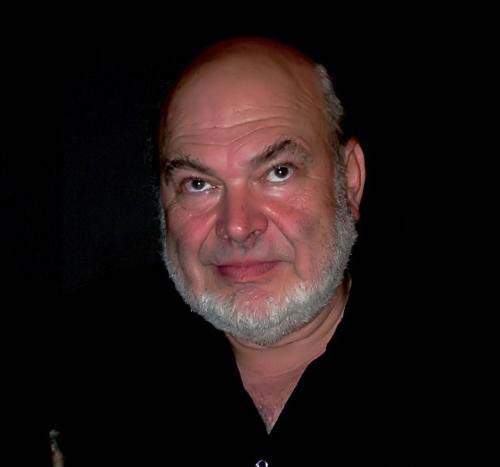

Konrad R. Fiałkowski (29 December 1939 – 23 November 2020) was a Polish engineer, information technology scientist and hard science fiction writer.

== Life ==
Born in Lublin, Fiałkowski held the titles of Professor at American Rensselaer Polytechnic Institute and Warsaw University.

== Scientific work ==
In 1966 he was part of the team which designed the minicomputer series ANOPS for biomedical apptilcations.

== Books ==
=== Scientific books ===
- K. Fiałkowski, T. Bielicki, „Homo przypadkiem sapiens”, Wyd. PWN, Warszawa 2008, ISBN 978-83-01-15632-9
- „Wprowadzenie do Informatyki”, 1978, Państwowe Wydawnictwa Naukowe, Warszawa (współautor J. Bańkowski). 3 wydania.
- „Programowanie w języku FORTRAN dla ODRA 1300, ICL 1900, CDC CYBER 70”, 1978 Państwowe Wydawnictwa Naukowe, Warszawa (współautorzy J. Bańkowski i Z. Odrowąż-Sypniewski).
- „Programowanie w języku FORTRAN” 1972, Państwowe Wydawnictwa Naukowe, Warszawa (współautor J. Bańkowski). 4 wydania.
- „Autokody i programowanie maszyn cyfrowych”, 1963, Wydawnictwa Naukowo Techniczne, Warszawa. 3 wydania
- „Maszyna ZAM-2”, 1963, Wydawnictwa Naukowo Techniczne, Warszawa.

=== Novels ===
- Homo divisus (1979)
- Adam, jeden z nas (1986)

=== Short story collections ===
- Wróble Galaktyki (1963)
- Poprzez piąty wymiar (1967)
- Włókno Claperiusa (1969)
- Kosmodrom (1975)
- Kosmodrom 2 (1976)
- Witalizacja kosmogatora (1978)
- Cerebroskop (1978)
- Kosmodrom (1982)
- Biohazard (1990)
- Star City. Opowieści z Marsa (2007) (with Rafał Kosik)
- Nieśmiertelny z Wegi (2014)
- Zerowe rozwiązanie (2014)

== Adaptations ==
Some author's short stories were adapted for film and TV: Kopia (2018, short film), based on short story Telefon Wigilijny ("Christmas Phone"); Biohazard (1977, TV film, 1975, TV show) based on short story Biohazard; Porprzez piaty wymiar ("Through the Fifth Dimension") (1973, TV film) based on the story of the same name.
