= Balgariya tarsi talant season 8 =

Balgariya tarsi talant
- Season 8
- Promotional poster featuring judges Nikolaos Tsitiridis, Evelyn Kostova, Todor Kantardzhiev and Katerina Evro
- Hosted by: Aleksandar Kadiev; Daniel Petkanov; Kris Zahariev (backstage)
- Judges: Nikolaos Tsitiridis; Katerina Evro; Evelyn Kostova; Todor Kantardzhiev
- Winner: Stefan Ivanov
- Runner-up: Chitalishte "Nauka"
- No. of episodes: 14

Release
- Original network: bTV
- Original release: February 14 – May 15, 2022

Season chronology
- Next → Season 9

The eighth season of the Bulgarian talent show competition series Balgariya tarsi talant started airing on bTV on February 14, 2022, with the final held on May 15, 2022. Katerina Evro returned for her third season in the judging panel. She was joined by new judges Nikolaos Tsitiridis, Evelyn Kostova and Todor Kantardzhiev. Aleksandar Kadiev and Daniel Petkanov returned as hosts from the previous two seasons, while Kris Zahariev returned as the backstage host from the previous year. The episodes were aired every Sunday at 20:00.

The season was won by 6-year-old bagpiper Stefan Ivanov, followed by the folklore dance group at chitalishte "Nauka" in second place and dance group Ballet "Vega" in third.

== Production ==
The next season was announced right after the end of the previous one. In mid 2021 the dates for the preliminary auditions were revealed:

Dates	City	Audition location	Ref.
September 9 & 18-19, 2021	Sofia	Hotel "Hemus"	
September 11, 2021	Varna	Hotel "Aqua"	
September 12, 2021	Burgas	Hotel "Aqua"	
September 17, 2021	Plovdiv	House of Culture "Boris Hristov"	

On October 8 it was announced that Aleksandar Kadiev and Daniel Petkanov would return as the hosts and Kris Zahariev would come back as the backstage host. On October 12 actress Evelyn Kostova was announced as the first new member of the jury alongside returning judge actress Katerina Evro. Four days later were named the last two new judges - comedian and TV host Nikolaos Tsitiridis and epidemiologist prof. Todor Kantardzhiev.

== Season overview ==
=== Auditions ===
The auditions aired between February 14 and April 17, 2022. Each member of the jury and the hosts had one golden buzzer. Over 140 acts auditioned, but only 42 of them could advance to the semi-finals.

=== Live shows ===
Participant	Age(s)	Performance Type	From	Semi-final	Finished
Aleks Kostov	21	Equilibrist	Varna	3	Eliminated
Angel Blazhev	7	Geographer	Sofia	2	Eliminated
Angel Prodanov	26	Voice impressionist	Sofia	3	Eliminated
Ashley Mally	35	Hoop artist	England	2	Eliminated
BABS.BG	—N/a	Rock group	Kazanlak	3	Eliminated
Ballet "Vega"	—N/a	Dance group	Targovishte	2	Third place
Bambini	—N/a	Music group	Plovdiv	1	Eliminated
Chitalishte "Nauka"	—N/a	Folklore dance group	Yablanitsa	1	Runner-Up
Darya Ivantsova & Foundation "Sharo"	—N/a	Dog act	Sofia	1	Finalist
Deyan Chilov	—N/a	Magician	Sliven	1	Eliminated
Ekaterina Shelehova	25	Opera singer	Canada	2	Eliminated
Ersan Sherif	28	Pop-folk musician	Shumen	2	Eliminated
Freja	33 & 32	Scandinavian music duo	Sofia	1	Eliminated
Georgi Stanev	29	Absolute pitch possessor	Ruse	—N/a	Finalist
Grupa "Magiya"	—N/a	Music group	Plovdiv	2	Finalist
Infinity	29 & 35	Aerialist duo	Sofia & Dobropillia	1	Eliminated
Ivan Tsatchev	23	Beatboxer	Pleven	3	Eliminated
Jazz band Dobrich	—N/a	Jazz group	Dobrich	3	Eliminated
Kristiana Kirilova	17	Yodel singer	Veliko Tarnovo	2	Eliminated
La Compagnia Colonna	—N/a	Pole dance group	Italy	—N/a	Finalist
Luiza Dushkova	29	Circus performer	Sofia	2	Eliminated
Magdalena Aleksandrova	13	Singer	Montana	3	Eliminated
Maria Moncheva	27	Acrobat	Plovdiv	3	Eliminated
Martin Lyubenov Band	—N/a	Music band	Sofia	1	Eliminated
Mona	17	Folklore singer	Kyustendil	—N/a	Finalist
Natasha Korotkina	32	Belly dancer	Ukraine	3	Eliminated
Nick Nikolaev	25	Drummer	Ruse	1	Eliminated
Nikita Gergert	29	Contortionist	Russia	2	Eliminated
Paskal Paskalev	43	Comedian mentalist	Dobrich	1	Eliminated
PROJECT 360	—N/a	Dance group	Sofia	3	Eliminated
RECREATE	19–24	Freerunner group	Sofia	1	Eliminated
SacMJJ	30	Michael Jackson dance impersonator	Ecuador	1	Eliminated
Saif Ur Rehman	48	Comedian	Pakistan	1	Eliminated
Soto	53	Squatting nutcracker	Spain	1	Eliminated
Skating Phoenix Duo	26 & 31	Skating acrobat duo	Cuba	—N/a	Finalist
Spalni mesta	—N/a	Pop-punk trio	Sofia	2	Eliminated
StarBoy AYVON	19	Illusionist	Sofia	3	Finalist
Stefan Ivanov	6	Bagpiper	Sofia	3	Winner
Stoyan Yordanov "Chibo"	30	Amateur singer	Bezmer	—N/a	Finalist
Trigaida	—N/a	Folktronica trio	Sofia	2	Eliminated
Vasil Levski National Military University	—N/a	Combat demonstration group	Veliko Tarnovo	3	Finalist
Victor Kazakov	12	Hip-hop dancer	Sofia	1	Eliminated
Victoria Ilieva	21	Modern dancer	Plovdiv	2	Eliminated
VS Dance Kids Crew	—N/a	Dance group	Sofia	3	Eliminated
WEB Burleska	—N/a	High-tech variety performance	Sofia	2	Eliminated
Wes-P	34	Novelty act	Japan	3	Eliminated
Yuriy Zahariev	45	Illusionist	Sofia	2	Eliminated

Buzzed out | Judges' vote | Won the Public's Vote | Won the Judges' Vote
Lost Judges' Vote | Originally eliminated, but later saved by the public online | Eliminated

==== Semi-final 1 (April 24) ====
Semi-Finalist	Order	Performance Type	Buzzes and judges' votes				Finished
Semi-Finalist	Order	Performance Type	Niko	Kateto	Evelyn	prof. Kantardzhiev	Finished
Martin Lyubenov Band	1	Music band					Eliminated
Paskal Paskalev	2	Comedian mentalist					Eliminated
Darya Ivantsova & Foundation "Sharo"	3	Dog act					2nd (Judges' Vote tied – Won on Public Vote)
Chitalishte "Nauka"	4	Folklore dance group					1st (Won Public Vote)
Saif Ur Rehman	5	Comedian					Eliminated
Freja	6	Scandinavian music duo					Eliminated
Victor Kazakov	7	Hip-hop dancer					3rd (Judges' Vote tied – Lost on Public Vote)
RECREATE	8	Freerunner group					Eliminated
SacMJJ	9	Michael Jackson dance impersonator					Eliminated
Soto	10	Squatting nutcracker					Eliminated
Nick Nikolaev	11	Drummer					Eliminated
Infinity	12	Aerialist duo					Eliminated
Bambini	13	Music group					Eliminated
Deyan Chilov	14	Magician					Eliminated

==== Semi-final 2 (May 1) ====
Semi-Finalist	Order	Performance Type	Buzzes and judges' votes				Finished
Semi-Finalist	Order	Performance Type	Niko	Kateto	Evelyn	prof. Kantardzhiev	Finished
Ballet "Vega"	1	Dance group					2nd (Won Judges' Vote)
Kristiana Kirilova	2	Yodel singer					3rd (Lost Judges' Vote)
WEB Burleska	3	High-tech variety performance					Eliminated
Ekaterina Shelehova	4	Opera singer					Eliminated
Yuriy Zahariev	5	Illusionist					Eliminated
Victoria Ilieva	6	Modern dancer					Eliminated
Trigaida	7	Folktronica trio					Eliminated
Ashley Mally	8	Hoop artist					Eliminated
Angel Blazhev	9	Geographer					Eliminated
Grupa "Magiya"	10	Music group					1st (Won Public Vote)
Nikita Gergert	11	Contortionist					Eliminated
Spalni mesta	12	Pop-punk trio					Eliminated
Luiza Dushkova	13	Circus performer					Eliminated
Ersan Sherif	14	Pop-folk musician					Eliminated

==== Semi-final 3 (May 8) ====
Semi-Finalist	Order	Performance Type	Buzzes and judges' votes				Finished
Semi-Finalist	Order	Performance Type	Niko	Kateto	Evelyn	prof. Kantardzhiev	Finished
StarBoy AYVON	1	Illusionist					Advanced (Won Second Chance Vote)
Wes-P	2	Novelty act					Eliminated
Aleks Kostov	3	Equilibrist					Eliminated
BABS.BG	4	Rock group					Eliminated
PROJECT 360	5	Dance group					Eliminated
Angel Prodanov	6	Voice impressionist					Eliminated
VS Dance Kids Crew	7	Dance group					Eliminated
Jazz band Dobrich	8	Jazz group					Eliminated
Natasha Korotkina	9	Belly dancer					Eliminated
Stefan Ivanov	10	Bagpiper					1st (Won Public Vote)
Magdalena Aleksandrova	11	Singer					3rd (Lost Judges' Vote)
Maria Moncheva	12	Acrobat					Eliminated
Vasil Levski National Military University	13	Combat demonstration group					2nd (Won Judges' Vote)
Ivan Tsachev	14	Beatboxer					Eliminated

==== Final ====
Winner | Runner-up | Third place

Finalist	Order	Performance Type	Finished
La Compagnia Colonna	1	Pole dance group	Finalist
Grupa "Magiya"	2	Music group	Finalist
Skating Phoenix Duo	3	Skating acrobat duo	Finalist
Darya Ivantsova & Foundation "Sharo"	4	Dog act	Finalist
Stefan Ivanov	5	Bagpiper	Winner
Vasil Levski National Military University	6	Combat demonstration group	Finalist
Georgi Stanev	7	Absolute pitch possessor	Finalist
StarBoy AYVON	8	Illusionist	Finalist
Mona	9	Folklore singer	Finalist
Balet "Vega"	10	Dance group	Third place
Chitalishte "Nauka"	11	Folklore dance group	Runner-up
Stoyan Yordanov "Chibo"	12	Amateur singer	Finalist

== Episodes ==
Ep. #	Episode	Airdate
1	Auditions 1	February 14, 2022
2	Auditions 2	February 20, 2022
3	Auditions 3	February 27, 2022
4	Auditions 4	March 6, 2022
5	Auditions 5	March 13, 2022
6	Auditions 6	March 20, 2022
7	Auditions 7	March 27, 2022
8	Auditions 8	April 3, 2022
9	Auditions 9	April 10, 2022
10	Auditions 10	April 17, 2022
11	Semi-final 1	April 24, 2022
12	Semi-final 2	May 1, 2022
13	Semi-final 3	May 8, 2022
14	Final	May 15, 2025
