= Balgariya tarsi talant =

Bulgarian reality television series

- Bulgarian: България търси талант
- Genre: Reality, Talent Show, Entertainment
- Created by: Simon Cowell
- Presented by: Maria Ignatova; Alexandra Raeva; Maria Silvestar; Aleksandar Kadiev; Daniel Petkanov; Petar Antonov
- Judges: Magarditch Halvadjian; Hilda Kazasyan; Krasimir Radkov; Vanya Tsvetkova; Esil Duran; Ivo Siromahov; Darina Pavlova; Iliana Benovska; Desi Dobreva; Nikolai Iliev; Assen Blatechki; Mihaela Fileva; Lyuben Dilov Jr. Slavena Vatova; Itso Hazarta; Lyubomir Neykov; Nikolaos Tsitiridis; Katerina Evro; Evelyn Kostova; Todor Kantardzhiev; Galena; Julian Vergov
- Country of origin: Bulgaria
- No. of seasons: 9
- No. of episodes: 172

Production
- Producer: bTV
- Production company: Fremantle

Original release
- Network: bTV
- Release: 1 March 2010 – present

Balgariya tarsi talant (English: Bulgaria Searches for a Talent) is the Bulgarian version of the Got Talent series. It launched on bTV on 1 March 2010. Singers, dancers, comedians, variety acts, and other performers compete against each other for audience support. The winner of the show will receive 60,000 leva (about €30,000).

The first two seasons of the show was produced by Global Films. The third season and from the fifth season onwards the show was produced by bTV themselfs. The fourth season was produced by Seven-Eight Productions.

== Series overview ==
Season	Episodes	Start	Final	Winner	Runner-up	Third place	Prize
1	32	March 1, 2010	May 24, 2010	Bogdana Petrova	Effect	Elisaveta Gancheva	60 000 lev
2	25	March 5, 2012	May 29, 2012	Kristina Arabadzhieva	Metin Enimehmedov	Victoria Tsankova	60 000 lev
3	25	March 3, 2014	May 26, 2014	Thomas Tomov	Borislava Ivanova	Behaydin Simeonov	60 000 lev
4	21	March 15, 2015	May 31, 2015	Plamen Lyubenov	Metodi Metodiev	Leon Petkov	60 000 lev
5	14	March 6, 2016	June 5, 2016	Vivo Montana	Presiyana and Mirela Dimitrovi	Jacklyn Tarrakci	50 000 lev
6	14	September 15, 2019	December 15, 2019	Andriyan Asenov	Georgi Georgiev	Dance Station	50 000 lev
7	13	February 28, 2021	May 30, 2021	Kaloyan Geshev	Junior Band	Mert Dermendzhiev	50 000 lev
8	14	February 14, 2022	May 15, 2022	Stefan Ivanov	Chitalishte Nauka	Balet Vega	50 000 lev
9	14	September 14, 2025	December 14, 2025	Konstantin Chervenkov	Kristina Kostova	Creators	90 000 lev

== Judges and hosts ==
Season		Hosts		Judges				Guests judges
1		Maria Ignatova	Alexandra Raeva	Lyuben Dilov Jr.	Hilda Kazasyan	Magarditch Halvadjian		Vasil Vasilev-Zueka, Ani Salich и Stefan Danailov
2	until 1st semi-final	Maria Ignatova	Alexandra Raeva	Lyuben Dilov Jr.	Hilda Kazasyan	Magarditch Halvadjian		Encho Keryazov, Vanya Tsvetkova и Kalin Surmenov
2	from 2nd semi-final	Maria Ignatova	Alexandra Raeva	Lyuben Dilov Jr.	Hilda Kazasyan	Krasimir Radkov		Encho Keryazov, Vanya Tsvetkova и Kalin Surmenov
3		Maria Silvestar		Assen Blatechki	Vanya Tsvetkova	Esil Duran	Lyuben Dilov Jr.	Krasimir Radkov
4	until 4th semi-final	Maria Silvestar	Aleksandar Kadiev	Ivo Siromahov	Darina Pavlova	Iliana Benovska	Nikolai Iliev	
4	from 5th semi-final	Maria Silvestar	Aleksandar Kadiev	Ivo Siromahov	Darina Pavlova	Desi Dobreva	Nikolai Iliev	
5		Maria Silvestar		Assen Blatechki	Itso Hazarta	Mihaela Fileva	Lyuben Dilov Jr.	
6		Daniel Petkanov	Aleksandar Kadiev	Itso Hazarta	Katerina Evro	Slavena Vatova	Lyuben Dilov Jr.	
7	auditions	Daniel Petkanov	Aleksandar Kadiev	Itso Hazarta	Katerina Evro	Slavena Vatova	Lyuben Dilov Jr.	
7	live shows	Daniel Petkanov	Aleksandar Kadiev	Itso Hazarta	Katerina Evro	Slavena Vatova	Lyubomir Neykov	
8		Daniel Petkanov	Aleksandar Kadiev	Nikolaos Tsitiridis	Katerina Evro	Evelyn Kostova	Todor Kantardzhiev	
9		Petar Antonov	Aleksandar Kadiev	Nikolaos Tsitiridis	Katerina Evro	Galena	Julian Vergov	

== Auditions ==
Auditions were held in the 5 biggest cities in Bulgaria - Varna, Plovdiv, Sofia, Rousse and Bourgas.

== Season 1 (2010) ==
Season 1 began on March 1, 2010 with a judging lineup consisting of writer, journalist and politician Lyuben Dilov Jr., jazz singer Hilda Kazasian and producer Magarditch Halvadjian and hosted by actresses Maria Ignatova and Alexandra Raeva. During the auditions there were several guest judges - actor Stefan Danailov, comedian and actor Vasil Vasilev-Zueka and journalist Ani Salich. The live shows began on April 19 and finished on May 24. The winner became 17-year-old visually impaired singer Bogdana Petrova.

== Season 2 (2012) ==
Season 2 started on March 5, 2012, after a 1 year gap from the first season, and utilized the same panel and hosts from the first season. As the previous season, during the auditions three guest judges appeared on the show - acrobat Encho Keryazov, actress Vanya Tsvetkova and actor Kalin Surmenov. The first live show was held on Аpril 17, however starting from the second live show on April 24, 2012, comedian and actor Krasimir Radkov replaced Magarditch Halvadjian in the jury, after the network censored two of the other shows of the producer. The final took place on May 29, when 12-year-old singer Kristina Arabadzhieva was announced as the winner.

== Season 3 (2014) ==
Before the beginning of the season, on February 6 started a special talk-show called "The best of the world talents" where various acts from the franchise around the world were aired for one month each Wednesday with the host being last season judge Krasimir Radkov. Three episodes were aired with the second and third featuring a guest commenter - rapper 100 Kila and actress Yana Marinova. A fourth episode was aired on May 1.

Season 3 began on March 3, 2014, after the show took once again a 1 year break, and saw changes in the cast as the network produced the show itself - Lyuben Dilov Jr. was joined by actress Vanya Tsvetkova (who was a guest judge last season), pop-folk singer Esil Duran and actor Assen Blatechki. Actress Maria Silvestar became the new host. In one of the auditions Krasimir Radkov replaced Dilov Jr. The live shows began on April 14 and the final was held on May 26. This season was won by 17-year-old opera singer Thomas Tomov.

== Season 4 (2015) ==
Season 4 began on March 15, 2015 and once again there were many changes due to the new producer being Slavi Trifonov - the new jury consisted of writer, journalist and TV host Ivo Siromahov, businesswoman and actress Darina Pavlova, journalist and TV host Iliana Benovska and actor and producer Nikolai Iliev. Maria Silvestar was joined by new host Aleksandar Kadiev. The live shows started on April 19. From the fifth live show on May 17 onwards, folklore singer Desi Dobreva replaced Benovska, after the latter made inappropriate comments during one of the shows. The grand final took place on May 31. The winner of the fourth season was 20-year-old wheelchair breakdancer Plamen Lyubenov.

== Season 5 (2016) ==
Season 5 started on March 6, 2016 and the cast was again changed as again the network took over the production - Lyuben Dilov Jr. and Assen Blatechki returned after a 1 season gap, with the jury being complete by rapper Itso Hazarta and pop singer Mihaela Fileva. Maria Silvestar hosted for the third season in a row, but this time she was the only host again. The live shows started on April 17 and ended on June 5. The winners became 18–44-year-old folklore and rock band Vivo Montana.

== Season 6 (2019) ==
Season 6 commenced on September 15, 2019, three years after the last season. Lyuben Dilov Jr. and Itso Hazarta returned to the judging panel from the previous season and were joined by actress and TV host Katerina Evro and model and Miss Bulgaria 2006 Slavena Vatova. The new hosts were former season 4 host Aleksandar Kadiev (who is also Katerina Evro's son) and influencer Daniel Petkanov, who also hosted the online backstage episodes. The live shows began on November 24 and concluded on December 15. 31-year-old blind imitator Adriyan Asenov was crowned as the winner.

== Season 7 (2021) ==
Season 7 began on February 28, 2021, after the show couldn't be filmed the previous year due to the pandemic. The judges and hosts were the same as the last season, but this time there was a backstage host - influencer Kris Zahariev. The live shows started on May 9 with a change - actor and comedian Lyubomir Neykov replaced Dilov Jr. after the latter joined the 45th National Assembly of Bulgaria. The season ended on May 30, when 10-year-old mental calculator Kaloyan Geshev was announced as the winner.

== Season 8 (2022) ==
Season 8 started on February 14, 2022 with a new judging panel - Katerina Evro returned alongside new judges stand-up comedian and TV host Nikolaos Tsitiridis, actress Evelyn Kostova and michrobiologist and epidemiologist Todor Kantardzhiev. The hosts and backstage host were the same like the previous season. The live shows commenced on April 24 and the final was held on May 15. The winner was 6-year-old bagpiper Stefan Ivanov.

== Season 9 (2025) ==
Season 9 started on September 14, 2025, after three year absence. Nikolaos Tsitiridis and Katerina Evro returned to the judging panel accompanied by pop-folk singer Galena and actor Julian Vergov. Aleksandar Kadiev was joined by a new host - actor Petar Antonov. The live shows began on November 23 with the final airing on December 14, when 10-year-old mental calculator Konstantin Chervenkov was crowned as the winner.
