= Balgariya tarsi talant season 4 =

Balgariya tarsi talant
- Season 4
- Hosted by: Maria Silvestar; Aleksandar Kadiev; Boris Soltariyski (Results show 6)
- Judges: Ivo Siromahov; Darina Pavlova; Iliana Benovska (until Results show 4); Desi Dobreva (from Semi-final 5); Nikolai Iliev
- Winner: Plamen Lyubenov
- Runner-up: Metodi Metodiev
- No. of episodes: 21

Release
- Original network: bTV
- Original release: March 15 – May 31, 2015

The fourth season of the Bulgarian talent show competition series Balgariya tarsi talant premiered on bTV on March 15, 2015 and finished on May 31, 2015. The show saw an entire new panel of judges consisting of Ivo Siromahov, Darina Pavlova, Iliana Benovska (replaced by Desi Dobreva from May 17 until the final) and Nikolai Iliev. Maria Silvestar continued hosting from the previous season alongside new host Aleksandar Kadiev. The season was produced by a new producer - Slavi Trifonov's Seven-Eight Productions. The show was broadcast every Sunday at 20:00 and Monday at 21:30.

The season was won by 20-year-old wheelchair breakdancer Plamen Lyubenov, followed by balancer Metodi Metodiev in second place and beatboxer Leon Petkov" in third.

== Production ==
The following were the locations for the open ground auditions:

Dates	City	Audition location	Ref.
January 17-18, 2015	Varna	Interhotel "Cherno More"	
January 17-18, 2015	Plovdiv	Park-hotel "Sankt-Peterburg"	
January 23-25, 2015	Sofia	National Palace of Culture, Hall 12	
January 24-25, 2015	Burgas	Burgas Free University	
January 24-25, 2015	Veliko Turnovo	Chitalishte "Nadezhda 1869"	

On February 9 was revealed that the hosts would be actress and TV host Maria Silvestar, bein the only returning from the previous season's cast, joined by actor and TV host Aleksandar Kadiev. On February 12 was announced the new judging panel - writer, screenwriter, director and actor Ivo Siromahov, actress and TV producer Darina Pavlova, journalist Iliana Benovska and actor, screenwriter, director and producer Nikolai Iliev. Iliana Benovska was part of the judges until the fourth Results show on May 11. Starting on May 17, the fifth semi-final, she was replaced by folklore singer Desi Dobreva.

Filming started on the same day as the jury reveal in Hall 2 of the National Palace of Culture in Sofia. The live shows were filmed in Studio 5 of the complex PrimeTime Studios in German.

== Season overview ==
=== Auditions ===
The auditions were aired between March 15 and April 5, 2015. A new element was introduced - a golden buzzer, which each member of the jury and the hosts would get to press once in the auditions to send an act directly to the semi-finals, skipping the judges cut. 123 acts advanced, but the judges had to pick only 60 of them to make it to the semi-finals.

=== Live shows ===
Buzzed out | Judges' vote | Won the Public's Vote | Won the Judges' Vote
Lost Judges' Vote | Originally eliminated, but later saved by the public online | Withdrawn | Eliminated

==== Semi-final 1 (April 19) ====
Semi-Finalist	Order	Performance Type	Buzzes and judges' votes				Finished
Semi-Finalist	Order	Performance Type	Ivo	Darina	Iliana	Niki	Finished
Brass band and Youth cheerleading squad "Hristo Botev"	1	Music and dance troupe	^{1}	^{1}	^{1}	^{1}	2nd (Won Judges' Vote)
Rayna Boteva and Ivan Dimitrov	2	Theater and music duo					Eliminated
Atanas Atanaschev	3	Dancer					Eliminated
Deyan Asenov	4	Improvising singer and musician					1st (Won Public Vote)
"Latin Force"	5	Dance group					Advanced (Won Second Chance Vote)
Dimitar Penchev	6	Beatboxer					Eliminated
"Bul Kempo"	7	Combat sport federation					Eliminated
Radko Petkov	8	Singer					3rd (Lost Judges' Vote)
Ivan Chukarski	9	Comedian scientist					Eliminated
Duo "Arsen"	10	Magic duo					Eliminated

- ^1 The judges were not asked to vote one by one, but instead they collectively choose which act to go to the final during the ad break, with their choice announced by Nikolai Iliev.
- During the Results show guest performers were acrobatic duo "Plachkov".

==== Semi-final 2 (April 26) ====
Semi-Finalist	Order	Performance Type	Buzzes and judges' votes				Finished
Semi-Finalist	Order	Performance Type	Ivo	Darina	Iliana	Niki	Finished
"Full Dance"	1	Dance group					Eliminated
Andjela Tsolova	2	Singer					Eliminated
Martin Petrushev	3	Rapper					Eliminated
Metodi Metodiev	4	Balancer					1st (Won Public Vote)
Children's puppet theater "Shturche"	5	Singer					3rd (Lost Judges' Vote)
Iliya Gechev	6	Dancer					Eliminated
"For a Distance"	7	Music group					Eliminated
Tsvetozara Milenkova	8	Rhytmic gymnast					2nd (Won Judges' Vote)
Georgi Todorov	9	Magician					Eliminated
Ivan Dobrinov	10	Danger act					Eliminated

- During the Results show guest performer was culinar chef Radi Stambolov.

==== Semi-final 3 (May 3) ====
Semi-Finalist	Order	Performance Type	Buzzes and judges' votes				Finished
Semi-Finalist	Order	Performance Type	Ivo	Darina	Iliana	Niki	Finished
"Creators"	1	Dance group					Eliminated
Bagpipe ensemble "Dinyo Marinov"	2	Music group					3rd (Judges' Vote tied – Lost on Public Vote)
Detelina Buntova	3	Singer					Eliminated
Anonymous	4	Magician					Eliminated
Nadka Dimcheva	5	Dancer					Eliminated
Dimitar Hodzhev "Krika"	6	Danger act					Eliminated
Duo "Sense"	7	Ballancer duo					Eliminated
Leon Petkov	8	Beatboxer					1st (Won Public Vote)
Waleed Shamdin	9	Comedian danger act					Withdrew^{2}
Tapia Dance House	10	Acrobatics child group					2nd (Judges' Vote tied – Won on Public Vote)

- ^2 Waleed Shamdin was not present during the live show due to unexplained reasons. As Ivo Siromahov gave him the Golden Buzzer, he performed his act - to knock over and break a wardrobe with his head.
- During the Results show guest performer was auntie Maria, who was eliminated during the auditions round. She and Ivo Siromahov performed an original song. Iliana pressed the red buzzer for them.

==== Semi-final 4 (May 10) ====
Semi-Finalist	Order	Performance Type	Buzzes and judges' votes				Finished
Semi-Finalist	Order	Performance Type	Ivo	Darina	Iliana	Niki	Finished
"Chudesiya"	1	Folklore dance ensemble					3rd (Judges' Vote tied – Lost on Public Vote)
"Potrez"	2	Rap group					Eliminated
Yasmin and Paris Kirilovi	3	Dance duo					Eliminated
Konstantin Tudzharov	4	Yo-yo artist					Eliminated
Ivelina Andreeva	5	Singer					2nd (Judges' Vote tied – Won on Public Vote)
Plamen Lyubenov	6	Wheelchair breakdancer					1st (Won Public Vote)
Trio "Algara"	7	Music group					Eliminated
Ivan Petrov "Vensan"	8	Magician					Eliminated
Tsvetomira Nacheva	9	Dancer					Eliminated
"Bezimennite"	10	Breakdance group					Eliminated

- Guest performer during the Results show was magician Astor.

==== Semi-final 5 (May 17) ====
Semi-Finalist	Order	Performance Type	Buzzes and judges' votes				Finished
Semi-Finalist	Order	Performance Type	Ivo	Darina	Desi	Niki	Finished
"The Basement"	1	Dance group					Eliminated
Simona Boykova	2	Pole dancer and aerialist					2nd (Won Judges' Vote)
Polya Ivanova	3	Singer					1st (Won Public Vote)
Dimitar Penchev	4	Carving artist					Eliminated
Murad Murad	5	Dancer					Eliminated
Petar Bakurdzhiev "Nabora"	6	Danger motor act					Eliminated
Rhythmic gymnastics club "Levski"	7	Folklore dance ensemble					3rd (Lost Judges' Vote)
Viktor Hristov	8	Dancer					Eliminated
Jennifer Tsankov "Jenny Jo"	9	Magician					Eliminated
"Bezimennite"	10	Breakdance group					Eliminated

- During the Results show guest performer was aerialist Benita Primo.

==== Semi-final 6 (May 24) ====
Semi-Finalist	Order	Performance Type	Buzzes and judges' votes				Finished
Semi-Finalist	Order	Performance Type	Ivo	Darina	Desi	Niki	Finished
Andrey Ivanov	1	Balloon artist					Eliminated
National aesthetic group gymnastics team	2	Aesthetic grymnastics group					Eliminated
Elizabet Zlatkova	3	Singer					Eliminated
Theater studio "Smehurko"	4	Theater troupe					Eliminated
Aleksandra Kiteva	5	Drummer					3rd (Lost Judges' Vote)
Iveta Tsvetkova	6	Juggler					Eliminated
Helin Hasan	7	Modern ballet dancer					1st (Won Public Vote)
Sirma Dobreva	8	Contortionist and acrobat					2nd (Won Judges' Vote)
"Electra Crew"	9	Breakdance group					Eliminated
Plamen Kachev	10	Danger act					Eliminated

- Aleksandar Kadiev was unable to host the Results show, which was held instead on Tuesday, so he was replaced by singer Boris Soltariyski. He was also one of the guest performers of the night, alongside artistic bartender Ivan Atanasov.

==== Final ====
The final was held on May 31 and it featured the twelve qualifiers from the semi-final plus a thirteenth act, chosen by the public as a wildcard.

Winner | Runner-up | Third place

Finalist	Order	Performance Type	Qualified by	Finished
"Latin Force"	1	Dance group	Second chance viewers vote	Finalist
Simona Boykova	2	Pole dancer and aerialist	Semi-final 5	Finalist
Leon Petkov	3	Beatboxer	Semi-final 3	Third place
Brass band and Youth cheerleading squad "Hristo Botev"	4	Music and dance troupe	Semi-final 1	Finalist
Polya Ivanova	5	Singer	Semi-final 5	Finalist
Helin Hasan	6	Modern ballet dancer	Semi-final 6	Finalist
Metodi Metodiev	7	Balancer	Semi-final 2	Runner-up
Tsvetozara Milenkova	8	Rhytmic gymnast	Semi-final 2	Finalist
Plamen Lyubenov	9	Wheelchair breakdancer	Semi-final 4	Winner
Ivelina Andreeva	10	Singer	Semi-final 4	Finalist
"Tapia Dance House"	11	Acrobatics child group	Semi-final 3	Finalist
Sirma Dobreva	12	Contortionist and acrobat	Semi-final 6	Finalist
Deyan Asenov	13	Improvising singer and musician	Semi-final 1	Finalist

- Guest performers were dance group "Makosa Nostra".

== Episodes ==
Ep. #	Episode	Airdate
1	Auditions 1	March 15, 2015
2	Auditions 2	March 16, 2015
3	Auditions 3	March 22, 2015
4	Auditions 4	March 23, 2015
5	Auditions 5	March 29, 2015
6	Auditions 6	March 30, 2015
7	Auditions 7	April 5, 2015
8	Judge Cuts	April 6, 2015
9	Semi-final 1	April 19, 2015
10	Results show 1	April 20, 2015
11	Semi-final 2	April 26, 2015
12	Results show 2	April 27, 2015
13	Semi-final 3	May 3, 2015
14	Results show 3	May 4, 2015
15	Semi-final 4	May 10, 2015
16	Results show 4	May 11, 2015
17	Semi-final 5	May 17, 2015
18	Results show 5	May 18, 2015
19	Semi-final 6	May 24, 2015
20	Results show 6	May 26, 2015
21	Final	May 31, 2015
