= Lyuben Dilov =

Bulgarian writer (1927–2008)

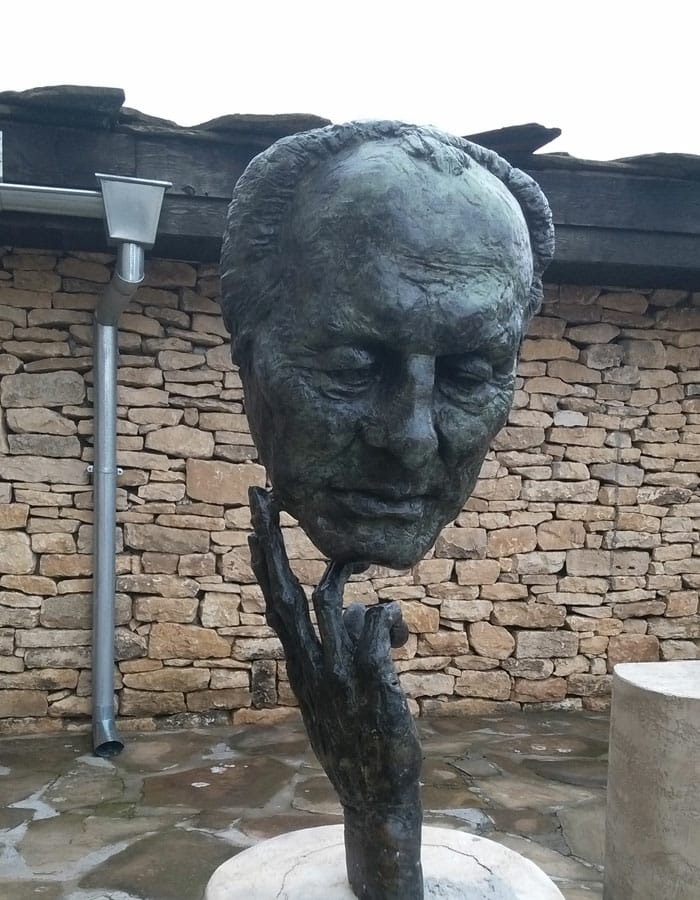
- Born: 25 December 1927; Cherven Bryag, Bulgaria
- Died: 10 June 2008 (aged 80); Sofia, Bulgaria
- Occupation: Writer
- Writing career
- Period: Communist era
- Genres: Science fiction, philosophy, children's literature, nonfiction, satire

Lyuben Ivanov Dilov (Любен Иванов Дилов, 25 December 1927- 10 June 2008), occasionally spelled Luben Dilov, Ljuben Dilov or Liuben Dilov was a Bulgarian science fiction writer of the Communist era and the author of acclaimed children's fiction and non-fiction works. He was the father of Bulgarian politician and screenwriter Lyuben Dilov Jr., who served in the National Assembly.

== Life ==
=== Childhood ===
Dilov was born in Cherven Bryag, Kingdom of Bulgaria in 1927. His father was a teacher, journalist and playwright inspired by the Bulgarian Enlightenment and the September Uprising. Dilov writes of his father: "good in character, impractical, and actively dreamy, probably naive, because so much kindness cannot but be naive, all his life he threw himself at being useful to people. As a result, we lived almost like Romani. Throughout the year, we moved with a horse-cart from rental to rental in Sofia, and each time the owners keeping the better part of our luggage because of the unpaid rent. Accordingly, I moved from school to school, so that today I have neither fond memories of that time nor close friends from the school years, which sometimes makes me feel almost like a person without a childhood and without roots." Dilov attended the school "Neofit Bozveli", where his father was a teacher, in the poverty-stricken "Vasil Levski" quarter of Sofia. Dilov's two-year-old brother died during this time.

"Dilo", Lyuben's father, as an active member of the Bulgarian Agrarian National Union(BZNS), was sent to translate dispatches in Nazi Germany on the party's behalf. The young family was able to take more luxurious lodgings and Lyuben joined a high school alongside the children of ministers and generals. Dilov joined his father in Berlin on 25 December 1939, exactly on his twelfth birthday. As the BZNS was facing persecution in Bulgaria, Dilov's father was compelled to remain in Berlin and create and edit the pro-government Bulgarian newspaper Rodina. Despite this, Dilov writes that his father was staunchly anti-Nazi, as were the vast majority of the thirty thousand Bulgarians living in Germany at the time. Dilov writes that the family, during their fifth and final year in Germany, occupied the lavish apartment of an old Jewish millionaire who was hiding himself in the attic and who would come down for tea at night. The Dilovs evacuated Berlin during the Allied bombing. Lyuben Dilov's father spent years imprisoned by the newly established Communist government in various concentration camps such as that at Belene Island.

=== Early career ===
Dilov graduated from high school in Lukovit (1947). He worked as a clerk in the Union of Bulgarian Writers (1953–1957). In 1954, he graduated from Sofia University, where he specialised in Bulgarian language and literature, part of the People's Republic's first generation of intellectuals. He started writing as a student, and his first stories were published in Narodna Mladezh (National Youth) newspaper. Dilov writes of being subject to undue persecution by his teachers and fellow students, on account of his father's political affiliations and his own non-partisanship.

He received the award of the Central Committee of DKMS (1963) for his (non-fiction) story "Boyan Darev's Holiday".

Dilov came to European prominence when he won the Eurocon award for Best Novel for The Path of Icarus (1976). Arkady Strugatsky considered The Path of Icarus one of the finest socialist-realism novels and a few years later, on his first ever trip abroad, Strugatsky visited Dilov in Bulgaria, spending time at the retreat of the writers' union in Hisarya and inspiring the Dilov story "The Plundered Truth", which is also dedicated to him.

In 1977, Dilov was one of the three editors of Bulgarian Fantasy with Ognyan Saparev and Stanka Pencheva. Pencheva, when asked why all three were required, answered, "Dilov is the writer, Saparev is the critic, and I am a poet - and the only one who likes SF!"

=== Biblioteka Galaktika ===
In 1979, Milan Asadurov founded the Biblioteka Galaktika publishing series and called on Dilov, Agop Melkonyan, Dimitr Peev, Ognyan Saparov, Elka Konstantinov, Svetozar Zlatarov, and Svetoslav Slavchev to serve as the editing staff. Biblioteka Galaktika, with its iconic spiral emblem and cover art by Tekla Aleksieva, offered the best Bulgarian science fiction and crime writers alongside the giants of the genres including translated works from Frank Herbert, Ursula K. Le Guin, Ray Bradbury, the Strugatskys, Stanislav Lem, Sakyo Komatsu, Pier Paolo Pasolini, etc. Dilov published two books in the series, a short story collection called Double Star (1979) and a reissue of his 1969 novel The Weight of the Spacesuit. Biblioteka Galaktika won the Eurocon award for Best Publisher in 1983.

=== Post-communism ===
Lyuben Dilov was one of the few Bulgarian writers whose post-communism writings have been described as "manuscripts in a drawer", a selective nomen for writings that had been prepared in anticipation of greater artistic freedom after the fall of the Zhivkov regime. Dilov was a candid critic of the former state of artistic repression in Bulgaria. His 1993 memoir For the Dead, Either Good or Funny included a tribute to dissident Georgi Markov, whose name hadn't appeared in state media since his assassination in 1978.

In 1990, Dilov created the Graviton Award, the first national recognition for Bulgarian science fiction, and presented the Graviton trophy to one writer and one visual artist (and later, one translator) every year until his death. The first recipients were writer and editor Agop Melkonyan, a long time colleague of Dilov's, and artist Tekla Aleksieva who, in addition to many other illustrated works, had already created over one hundred covers for the Biblioteka Galaktika series.

Dilov was awarded the Karel Čapek Medal of Honor for Cultural Contribution from the Czech Republic in 1991.

The Association of Bulgarian Writers was founded on 18 February 1994 and Lyuben Dilov was elected its first chairman.

In the last years of his life, a serious illness (Parkinson's) limited his ability to create.

== Works ==
Dilov's work consists of numerous short stories, fairy tales, novellas, short novels, memoirs and other non-fiction which was variously collected and recollected into over 35 books. Additionally, he authored two popular science fiction novels for young readers, the adventures of two teenage adventurers named Numi and Niki.

Dilov's early work was primarily nonfiction. His first book, Pigeons Over Berlin was a personal memoir. His first science fiction novel The Atomic Man was not a commercial success in 1958 but warranted a second printing to change the protagontist from an American to a Bulgarian.

Dilov is one of the most versatile authors of Bulgarian fiction, a refined stylist whose level of talent can be compared with the Strugatsky brothers and S. Lem. He is equally successful in writing socio-philosophical and parody-humorous science fiction, satirical grotesque, or fantasy detective. The stories that made up the collections Feed the Eagle (1977), Double Star (1979), etc. are characterized by parody-satirical intonation. Dilov ironizes the space and technological ambitions of mankind. O. Saparev aptly described Dilov, calling the science fiction writer "an ironic skeptic and a frivolous moralist." Among the great works of the 60's, the philosophical novel The Weight of the Spacesuit (1969) stands out, an original interpretation of the theme of Contact (Contact as a form of cosmic flirtation). But the problem of the novel is much broader - there is symbolism in the title: The weight of the spacesuit - is "the physical limitations of human existence, completely dependent on machines, without which man is defenseless in the icy horror of space.".

The novel The Weight of The Spacesuit (1969) was one of the first works to address the social and psychological effects of networking. O. Saparev wrote that it was "the most concise and complete, cast as if in one breath.. single example of Bulgarian science fiction."

JR Colombo has compared his work to famous American science fiction writer Clifford D. Simak, and he quotes Dilov as saying: "I'm the Bulgarian Cliff Simak - only better!". By 1990 the official state English-language journal Bulgarian Horizons: A Quarterly of Literature, Art and Science stated, of his reputation in Bulgaria at that time, that: "Lyuben Dilov is a fiction writer with a fine sense of plot, with a tendency to rationalize socially and philosophically world[-spanning] processes, and with a superb sense of humour". Colombo also characterizes Dilov as "anti-communist", but others characterize this as too broad a description of Dilov's criticisms towards the Todor Zhivkov regime.

About Bulgarian SF in general, Dilov has stated, "our SF is in the tradition of Bulgarian literature in general. trying to persuade the public to keep philosophical ideals alive"

Svetoslava Bancheva wrote of Dilov: "It is said that the great writers and poets sometimes make greater discoveries about the world than scientists. Lyuben Dilov was such a writer. His novels, novellas, and short stories are fun escapades for people with imagination, at the end of which (besides defeating the beasts, dragons, monsters, and cyclopses) the reader receives a great reward - true human philosophical knowledge. Lyuben Dilov's books provoke people to invent, to fantasize, to have fun and to put themself into the scenes, to interpret their lives through them and to enjoy the meaning and the knowledge. They are a philosophy of life..."

Dilov was a connoisseur of German-language literature and their popularizer in Bulgaria as a translator and author of prefaces. He compiled collections of prose by Siegfried Lenz (1972, 1974, 1979), the anthologies "Contemporary German Stories" (1970), "When the War Is Over" (1971), "Maritime Novels from Austria, the Federal Republic of Germany, Switzerland" ( 1976), "German Fiction Stories from the German Democratic Republic" (1987), "Fiction of the Federal Republic of Germany, Austria and Switzerland" (1981) and others.

His books were translated into Eastern European languages such as Russian, Czech, Polish, German and Hungarian.

=== The Fourth Law of Robotics ===
In his novel The Path of Icarus (1974) Dilov described the Fourth Law of Robotics, extending the original Three Laws proposed by Isaac Asimov to include: A robot must establish its identity as a robot in all cases." Dilov stated that the reason for the fourth safeguard was that: "The last Law has put an end to the expensive aberrations of designers to give psychorobots as humanlike a form as possible. And to the resulting misunderstandings..."

=== Children's literature ===
- «Кладенецът на таласъмите» The Well of Goblins(written with ) - 1963
- Happy and Sad - 1975

=== Novels ===
- «Атомният човек» The Atomic Man— 1958
- «Помня тази пролет» I Remember This Spring— 1964
- «Многото имена на страха» The Many Names of Fear— 1967
- «Тежестта на скафандъра» The Weight of the Spacesuit— 1969
- «Пътят на Икар» The Path of Icarus— 1974
- «Парадоксът на огледалото» The Mirror Paradox— 1976
- «Звездните приключения на Нуми и Ники» The Starry Adventures of Niki & Numi — 1980
- «Пропуснатият шанс. Из съчиненията на моя компютър» The Missed Chance: From the Works of my Computer — 1981
- «Незавършеният роман на една студентка» Unfinished Novel of a Student— 1982
- «До Райската планета и назад. Другите приключения на Нуми и Ники» — 1983
- «Жестокият експеримент» The Cruel Experiment — 1985
- «Библията на Лилит» Lilith's Bible— 1999
- «Голямата стъпка» Bigfoot or The Big Step — 1999
- «Демонът на Максуел» Maxwell's Demon — 2001
- «Да избереш себе си» Choose Yourself — 2002

=== Short story collections ===
- The Path of Fidelity (1967)
- Double Star (1969)
- A Profile of Myself (1977)
- No Smoking! Fasten Your Seatbelts (1982)
- Lagrange Point (1983)
- Even if They Leave (1987)
- We and the Others (1989)
- Forward, Humanity! (2017)

=== Non-fiction ===
- «» Pigeons Over Berlin - 1952
- «» Impressions from a Planet: Notes of a Science-Fiction Writer 1990
- «» For the Dead, Either Good or Funny
- «» Sex Life Under Totalitariansim
- «»

== In English translation ==
Dilov's story Contacts of a Fourth Kind was included in the English language multi-writer novel Tales from the Planet Earth. His story “The Stranger” was translated into English in full, and can be found in the book Introduction to modern Bulgarian literature (1969).

The Last Interview of Adam Sousbe, was included in Fantastika: Almanac of Bulgarian Speculative Fiction (2020).

In 2021, the short story "Even if They Leave", translated by Andy Erbschloe, was published by the SFRA Review.
