= Zhivko Sedlarski =

== Biography ==
Zhivko Sedlarski (born 16 September 1958) is a Bulgarian-French sculptor who lives and works in France.

Sedlarski was born in Elhovo, Bulgaria. He was introduced to art at an early age by his father, the painter Kolyo Sedlarski.

He graduated from the National Academy of Arts in Sofia and subsequently undertook sculpture training at the Academy of Fine Arts in Berlin. He has lived in France since 1991.

Sedlarski's work includes monumental and small-scale sculpture. He is particularly associated with sculptural representations inspired by women's clothing and haute couture, often using metal and other rigid materials.

His works have been exhibited internationally and are held in museums, galleries and private collections in several countries.

== Exhibitions (selection) ==
=== 2026 ===
- Fashion & Art – Balkan Open Door, Sofia, Bulgaria
- Primavera, Galerie d’exposition du Théâtre Saint-Louis, Cholet, France

=== 2025 ===
- Kuker Dance (Кукерско хоро), “Chez le Maire” Gallery, Pernik, Bulgaria
- Art Helps (Изкуството помага), “Sofia” Gallery, Sofia City Library, Sofia, Bulgaria
- Central Hall, Sofia, Bulgaria
- Kuker, Rayuvtsi, Bulgaria
- La Maison Gallery, Sofia, Bulgaria
- Festival Botanik'Art, Jardin Christian Dior, Granville, France
- Maison de l'Énergie, Kozloduy, Bulgaria

=== 2024 ===
- Cité des Notaires, Rennes, France
- Chambre Interdépartementale, Rennes, France
- Haute couture – Haute soudure, Mission Gallery, Sofia, Bulgaria
- Nestinarka, Rayuvtsi, Bulgaria
- National Sculpture Plein-Air, Rayuvtsi, Bulgaria
- Haute couture – Haute soudure, National Palace of Culture (NDK), Sofia, Bulgaria
- Haute couture – Haute soudure, NDK, Varna, Bulgaria
- La Maison Gallery, Sofia, Bulgaria

=== 2023 ===
- Sens-de-Bretagne, France
- Portes Ouvertes, Vieux-Vy-sur-Couesnon, France
- Lions Club, Cholet, France

=== 2022 ===
- Peinturier, Fougères, France
- Chapel of the Former Hospice, Goven, France

=== 2021 ===
- DevaM – Autumn, park of the Château de Coupvray, France
- DevaM-C, Crevin, France

=== 2020 ===
- Arbre bleu, Crevin, France

=== 2019 ===
- Plovdiv – European Capital of Culture, Aspect Gallery, Plovdiv, Bulgaria
- Inauguration of the monumental sculpture La Bretonne, Sens-de-Bretagne, France
- Haute Soudure parade, Grand Hôtel Primoretz, Burgas, Bulgaria
- Château des Pères, Piré-sur-Seiche, France

=== 2018 ===
- Jinji Lake Biennale, Suzhou, China
- Guns of Wind, Code Success Foundation, Sofia, Bulgaria
- Seewines Gallery, Sofia, Bulgaria
- Bulgarian Fashion Icon, Vitosha Park Hotel, Sofia, Bulgaria
- Project for Albena Resort, Bulgaria
- Château du Bois-Guy, Parigné, France
- Artcurial, Lyon, France

=== 2017 ===
- 35th Cultural Happy Hour, Bulgarian Haute Couture, Inspiring Culture, Brussels, Belgium
- Galerie NESI, Burgas, Bulgaria
- Qu Art Museum, Suzhou, China
- University of Edinburgh, Scotland
- Université libre de Bruxelles, Belgium
- Port of Antwerp, Antwerp, Belgium
- L'Océan, Suzhou Center, China
- Haute Soudure, Château du Bois-Guy, Parigné, France
- Artcurial, Lyon, France
- Cultural Centre, Saint-Pierre-de-Plesguen, France

=== 2016 ===
- Queen Elizabeth Olympic Park, London, England
- Haute Soudure, Bowling Center, Cap Malo, La Mézière, France
- Woman on the Bike, Taihu Lake, Suzhou, China
- Skating Women's, Taihu Lake, Suzhou, China
- Rainbow in the Dark, Lake Mansion, Suzhou, China
- Haute Soudure, Château du Bois-Guy, Parigné, France
- Artcurial, Lyon, France

=== 2015 ===
- Robe Pétillante, Beaune, France
- Qu Art, Suzhou, China
- Féminalise, Beaune, France
- Primavera, Galerie Rive Gauche, Namur, Belgium
- Galerie Valer, Sofia, Bulgaria
- Spazio Solferino 40, Milan, Italy

=== 2014 ===
- Ploum'expo, Ploumagoar, France

=== 2011 ===
- Musée Utrillo-Valadon, France
