= Tales from the Planet Earth =

1986 anthology edited by Frederik Pohl and Elizabeth Anne Hull

- Author: edited by Frederik Pohl and Elizabeth Anne Hull
- Cover artist: Manny Paul
- Language: English
- Genre: Science fiction
- Publisher: St. Martin's Press
- Publication date: 1986
- Publication place: United States
- Media type: Print (hardback) (Paperback)
- Pages: xviii + 268
- ISBN: 0-312-78420-1

Tales from the Planet Earth is a 1986 anthology of science fiction stories edited by Frederik Pohl and Elizabeth Anne Hull It presents 19 stories, sharing a common background developed by Pohl and Hull, by 18 authors from 18 countries; each author's story is set in his native country, plus one extra story by Pohl. According to its cover, it contains stories about aliens which came to "occupy our bodies and inhabit our souls" and they "must find humans capable of hosting personalities and thoughts transmitted across the cosmos".

The collection was dedicated for the memory of A. Bertram Chandler and Janusz A. Zajdel.

== Contents ==
- Sitting Around the Pool, Soaking Up the Rays · Frederik Pohl, originally in IASFM Aug ’84
- The Thursday Events · Ye Yonglie
- User Friendly · Spider Robinson
- Life as an Ant · André Carneiro
- Fiddling for Waterbuffaloes · Somtow Sucharitkul, originally in Analog Apr ’86
- S Is for Snake · Lino Aldani, originally "S come serpente", Urania #1021, Apr 27, ’86.
- The Divided Carla · Josef Nesvadba, originally "Rozštěpená Karla", in Literární Měsíčník Jun ’85
- The View from the Top of the Tower · Harry Harrison, originally in F&SF May ’86
- Don’t Knock the Rock · A. Bertram Chandler
- The Owl of Bear Island · Jon Bing
- Contacts of a Fourth Kind · Lyuben Dilov
- Infestation · Brian W. Aldiss
- In the Blink of an Eye · Carlos Maria Federici
- Particularly Difficult Territory · Janusz A. Zajdel (Polish title: "Wyjątkowo trudny teren")
- Time Everlasting · Sam J. Lundwall
- The Middle Kingdom · Tong Enzheng & Elizabeth Anne Hull, adapt.
- On the Inside Track · Karl-Michael Armer, originally in Entropie, 1986
- The Legend of the Paper Spaceship · Tetsu Yano; trans. by Gene Van Troyer & Tomoko Oshiro, originally 1978
- We Servants of the Stars · Frederik Pohl

== Reception ==
Orson Scott Card described the anthology as "a world tour of science fiction" and reported "it will make you more appreciative of the best of America sf -- and more impatient with sameness, the repetitiveness, the insularity that so often afflicts us."
