= Janusz Zajdel =

Polish author (1938–1985)

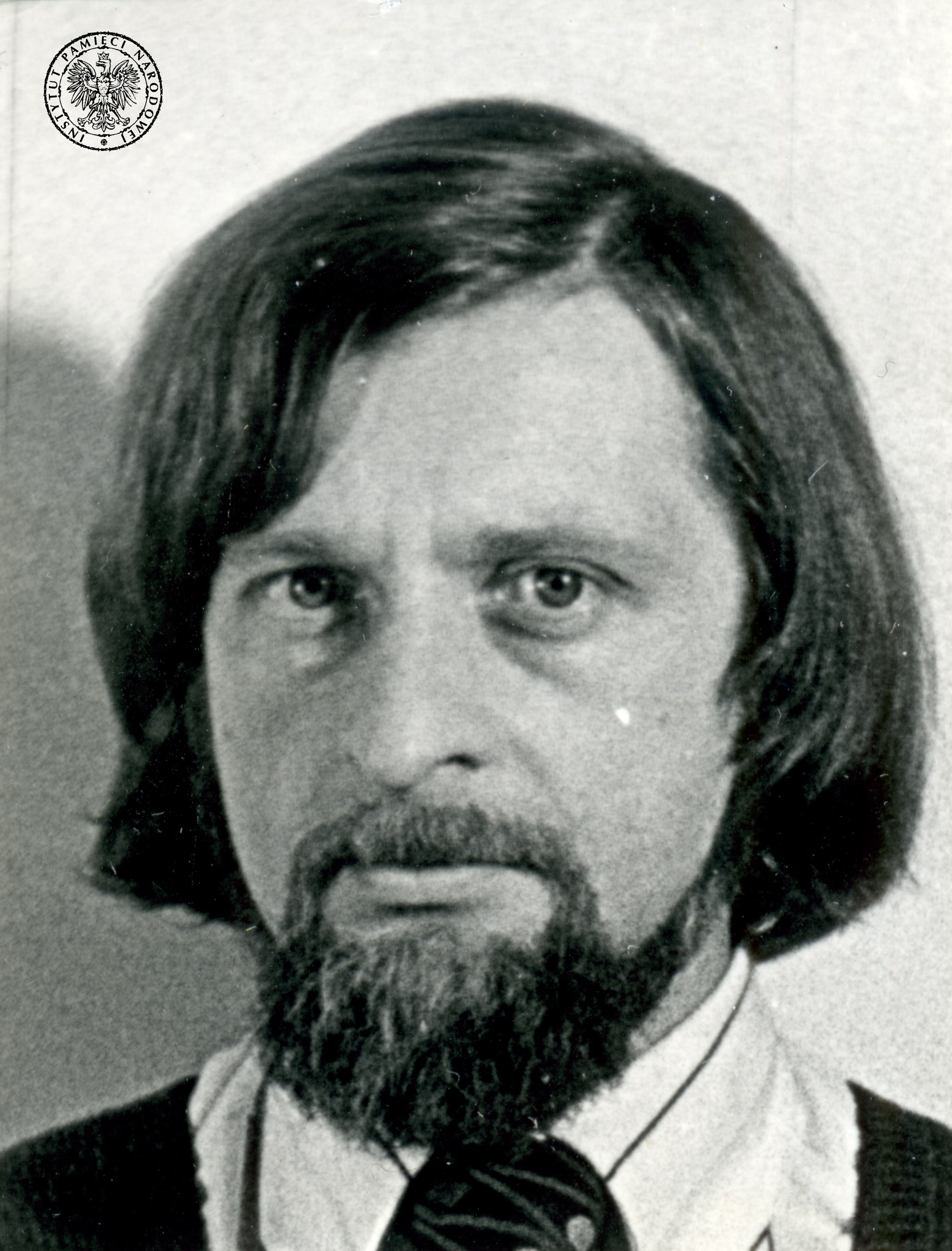
- Zajdel in 1977
- Born: 15 August 1938; Warsaw, Poland
- Died: 19 July 1985 (aged 46); Warsaw, Poland
- Occupation: Writer
- Writing career
- Period: 1961–1985
- Genres: science fiction, social science fiction

Janusz Andrzej Zajdel (15 August 1938 – 19 July 1985) was a Polish science fiction author, second in popularity in Poland to Stanisław Lem. His major genres were social science fiction and dystopia. His main recurring theme involved the gloomy prospects for a space environment into which mankind carried totalitarian ideas and habits: Red Space Republics, or Space Labor Camps, or both. His heroes desperately try to find meaning in the world around them.

The Polish science fiction fandom award was named after him: the Janusz A. Zajdel Award. He was a trustee of World SF.

== Life ==
Janusz Zajdel was born 15 August 1938 in Warsaw, Poland. He studied physics at the University of Warsaw. He was a member of the Union of Polish Youth and the Polish Students' Association. After graduating, he worked many years as a radiological engineer and an expert on nuclear physics at the Central Laboratory of Radiological Protection in Poland. He published a number of academic works, handbooks of safety regulations, as well as educational and popular science texts. In 1976 he joined the Polish Writers' Union.

In his spare time, he popularized science by writing science fiction. With his brother, he started a column in a Polish magazine for young people interested in science and engineering, Młody Technik (Young Technician), in which they proposed various futuristic gadgets. In 1961 Młody Technik published Zajdel's science-fiction debut, the short story "Tau Ceti" (Polish: Tau Wieloryba). Other stories by him soon appeared in several other Polish magazines.

His first book was published in 1965, a short-story anthology, Jad mantezji (The Venom of Mantesia), which included stories from Młody Technik and some others that had already appeared a year earlier in another anthology. By 1982 he had published four more collections: Przejście przez lustro (Through the Mirror, 1975); Iluzyt (1976); Feniks (The Phoenix, 1981); and Ogon diabła (The Devil's Tail, 1982).

His first novel, Lalande 21185, appeared in 1966, a year after his first short-story anthology, and was geared toward young adults. His first serious science-fiction novel was a "first contact"-type SF mystery, Prawo do powrotu (Right of Return, 1975); but it was his novels of the late 1970s and early 1980s – Cylinder van Troffa (Van Troff's Cylinder, 1980); Limes inferior (The Lower Limit, 1982); Cała prawda o planecie Ksi (The Whole Truth about Planet Xi, 1983); Wyjście z cienia (Out of the Shadows, 1983); and Paradyzja (Paradise: World in Orbit, 1984) – that earned him a reputation as one of the most important Polish science-fiction writers.

He was an active member of Polish and international science fiction fandom, and a Trustee of World SF. In the 1980s he was an active supporter of the Polish Solidarity movement.

On 19 July 1985 he died of lung cancer, after three years' struggle against the disease.

== Themes ==
Zajdel's early works, from the 1960s and early 1970s, focuses on scientific inventions and their role in space exploration, alien contact or artificial intelligence. As his writing career continued, however, his stories evolved to focus on the social aspects and often negative consequences of those inventions. Over time, a theme became increasingly visible in his works - a concern over dangers inherent in attempts to control the human society. He is also condemning human ignorance, warning against xenophobia, and asking philosophical questions about the nature of the universe, happiness and human destiny. Zajdel's works from his second period - late 1970s and 1980s - represent the genres of social and dystopian fiction. In his works, he envisions totalitarian states and societies living under extreme forms of mass surveillance.

His works are also recognized as being a critique of the totalitarian, communist state, a reality of his life in People's Republic of Poland. Science fiction genre, with its outer-worldly, clearly fictional, and often allegorical setting and invented jargon was able to debate fundamentals of such systems with frankness that more mainstream literature would not be allowed to.

== Importance ==
Zajdel has been described as the second science fiction writer in popularity in Poland after Stanisław Lem. He has also been described as the writer who replaced Lem as the "top Polish SF writer", after "Lem vacated [this position] earlier of his own volition".

He is recognized as an originator of the social science fiction genre in Polish science fiction, known in Poland as the sociological speculative fiction (fantastyka socjologiczna). He has been an inspiration to a number of younger Polish science fiction authors such as Maciej Parowski and Marek Oramus.

His works have been translated into Belarusian, Bulgarian, Czech, Esperanto, Finnish, German, Hungarian, Russian and Slovenian. As of August 2015, the only work translated into English is the short story Wyjątkowo trudny teren ("Particularly Difficult Territory") that Zajdel wrote for the English language Tales from the Planet Earth anthology edited by Frederik Pohl and Elizabeth Anne Hull.

== Recognition ==
In 1973 Zajdel received an honorary award Magnum Trophaeum from the Młody Technik (Young Technician) magazine for long-term cooperation. In 1980 Zajdel received the Polish Ministry of Culture and Arts Best SF Book of the Year Award for Van Troff's Cylinder. Zajdel also received the Golden Sepulka Award two times: for Limes Inferior (1982 novel; 1983 award) and Wyjście z cienia ("Out of the Shadow") (1983 novel; 1984 award). He was awarded the Medal of Merit for National Defence for his educational film scripts. Winner of Śląkfa for 1984.

In 1984 Polish fantasy and science fiction fandom (associated with the Polish SF convention Polcon) decided to establish an annual award, initially named Sfinks ("Sphynx"). Janusz A. Zajdel became the first winner of this award, for his 1984 novel Paradyzja. He won the award posthumously in 1985, shortly after his death, at which time it was decided to rename the award after him, and it became known as the Janusz A. Zajdel Award.

Frederik Pohl dedicated the anthology Tales From The Planet Earth to Zajdel and A. Bertram Chandler.

== Bibliography ==
In addition to the solo-authored works listed below, Zajdel's stories have also appeared in many anthologies of science-fiction stories, together with works by other authors.

=== Novels ===
- Lalande 21185), 1966
- Prawo do powrotu (Right of Return), Nasza Księgarnia, 1975
- Cylinder van Troffa (Van Troff's Cylinder), 1980
- Limes inferior (The Lower Limit), 1982
- Cała prawda o planecie Ksi (The Whole Truth about Planet Xi), 1983
- Wyjście z cienia (Coming out of the Shadow), 1983
- Paradyzja (Paradise: World in Orbit), 1984
- Drugie spojrzenie na planetę Ksi (A Second Look at Planet Xi), 2014
  - Posthumously completed by Marcin Kowalczyk, see Cała prawda o planecie Ksi for details

=== Short-story collections ===
- Jad mantezji (The Venom of Mantesia), Nasza Księgarnia, 1965
- Przejście przez lustro (Through the Mirror), Iskry, 1975)
- Iluzyt, Nasza Księgarnia, 1976
- Feniks (The Phoenix), Nasza Księgarnia, 1981
- Ogon diabła (The Devil's Tail), KAW, 1982
- Dokąd jedzie ten tramwaj? (Where Is This Streetcar Going?), 1988
- Wyższe racje (Higher Considerations), Wydawnictwo Poznańskie, 1988
- List pożegnalny (Farewell Letter [including outlines of unfinished novels]), Alfa, 1989
- Relacja z pierwszej ręki (First-hand Account), superNOWA, 2010

== See also ==
- Koalang – term invented by Zajdel
