= Balgariya tarsi talant season 9 =

Balgariya tarsi talant
- Season 9
- Promotional poster featuring judges Nikolaos Tsitiridis, Katerina Evro, Galena and Julian Vergov
- Hosted by: Aleksandar Kadiev; Petar Antonov
- Judges: Nikolaos Tsitiridis; Katerina Evro; Galena; Julian Vergov
- Winner: Konstantin Chervenkov
- Runner-up: Kristina Kostova
- No. of episodes: 14

Release
- Original network: bTV
- Original release: September 14 – December 14, 2025

Season chronology
- ← Previous; Season 8

Judges for Balgariya Tarsi Talant Season 9

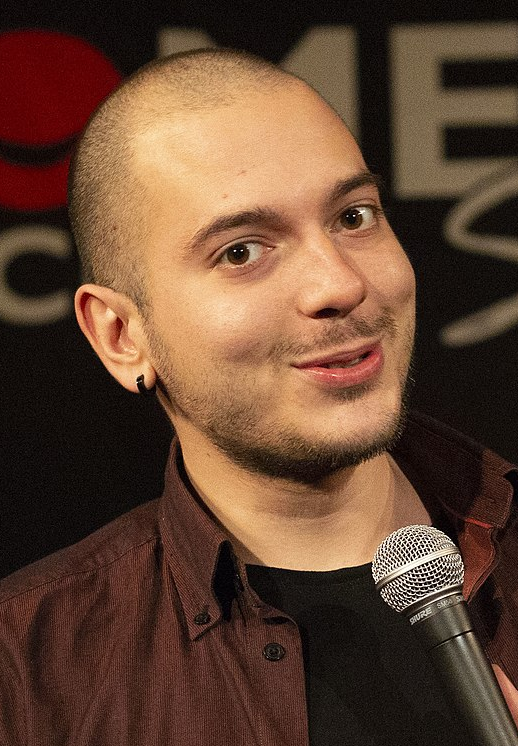
Nikolaos Tsitiridis

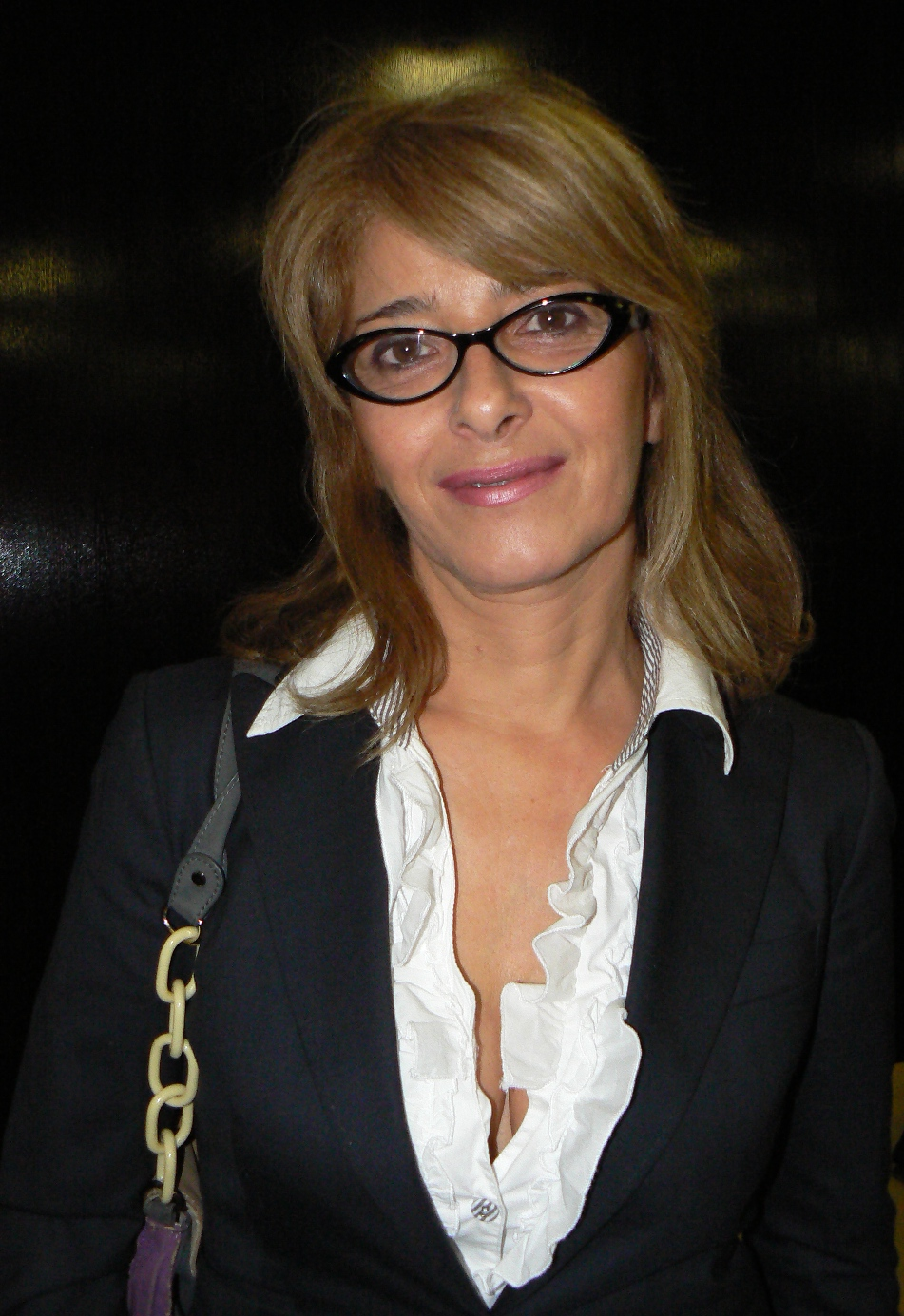
Katerina Evro

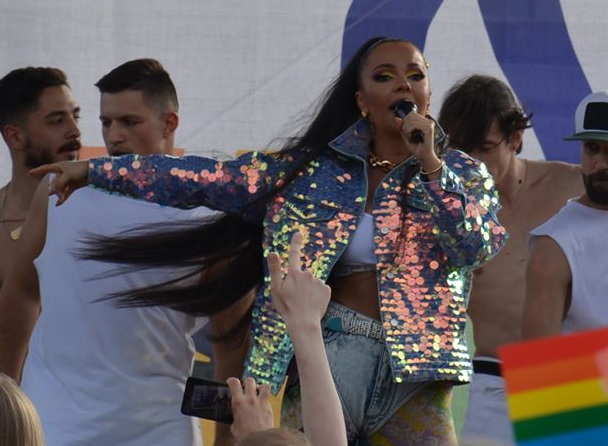
Galena

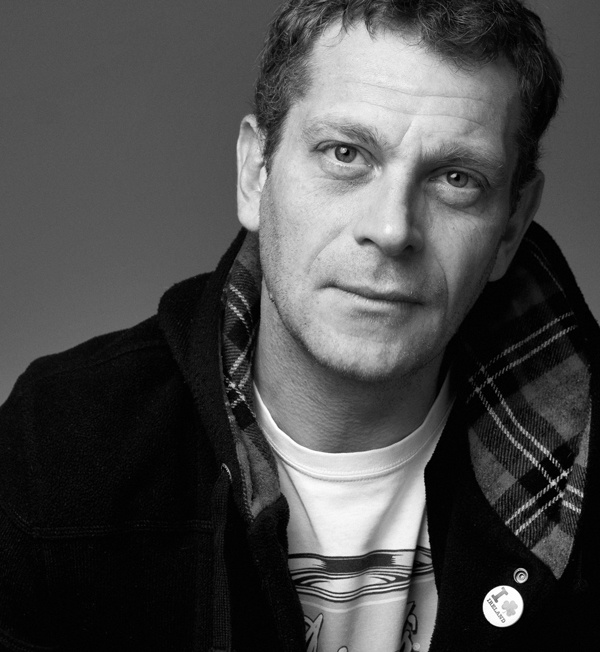
Julian Vergov

The ninth season of the Bulgarian talent show competition series Balgariya tarsi talant premiered on bTV on September 14, 2025 and finished on December 14, 2025. Katerina Evro and Nikolaos Tsitiridis returned as judges for their fourth and second respective seasons. They were joined by new judges Galena and Julian Vergov. Aleksandar Kadiev returned for his fifth season as a host, while being joined by new host Petar Antonov. The show was aired every Sunday at 20:00.

The season was won by 10-year-old mental calculator Konstantin Chervenkov, followed by speedcuber Kristina Kostova in second place and dance group "Creators" in third. This marks the second time that the winner received the golden buzzer (Galena pressed her golden buzzer for Konstantin) following Andriyan Asenov who won the sixth season.

== Production ==
On February 24, 2025 it was announced that "Balgariya Tarsi Talant" would return three years after the last season and that the online auditions were opened. The dates for the preliminary auditions were published on March 21:

Dates	City	Audition location	Ref.
April 12-13 & 30, 2025	Sofia	Hotel "Hemus"	
April 14, 2025	Plovdiv	House of Culture "Boris Hristov"	
April 26, 2025	Burgas	Hotel "Aqua"	
April 27, 2025	Varna	Hotel "Aqua"	

On April 29 pop-folk singer Galena was named as the first new judge of the season. Exactly one month later the next two judges were announced - actress Katerina Evro, who returned for her fourth consecutive season in the panel, and actor Julian Vergov. On June 11 the media stated that the fourth jury member would be comedian and TV host Nikolaos Tsitiridis, returning from the last season. On June 20 was revealed that the hosts would be actor and TV host Aleksandar Kadiev, with this being his fifth season, and new host actor Petar Antonov. The prize was the biggest in the show's history - 90 000 lv.

== Season overview ==
=== Auditions ===
The auditions aired between September 14 and November 16, 2025. Each member of the jury and the hosts had one golden buzzer. 120 out of all the 149 acts received 3 or 4 yeses, but the judges had to pick only 36 of them to make it to the semi-finals.

=== Live shows ===
Participant	Age(s)	Performance Type	From	Semi-final	Finished
Anna Vasilevich	14	Acrobatic dancer	Russia & Sofia	1	Eliminated
Arina Shilo	15	Pantomime actress	Ukraine & Burgas	1	Finalist
Arina Shvets	12	Gymnast	Ukraine & Sofia	3	Eliminated
"Balkanski bliznatsi"	28	Dance duo	Varna	1	Eliminated
"Battle of Legends"	—N/a	Calisthenics group	Sofia	2	Eliminated
"Benda bez ime"	—N/a	Music group	Sofia	1	Eliminated
Boyan Georgiev	12	Singer	Sofia	3	Eliminated
Chavdar Iliev	15	Reciter	Sofia & Aldomirovtsi	3	Finalist
Chirag Lukha	—N/a	Danger act	United Kingdom	2	Eliminated
"Creators"	—N/a	Dance group	Varna	1	Third place
Daniele Tommasi & Naimana Casanova	—N/a	Ventriloquist duo	Italy	1	Eliminated
Delyan Furchanov	22	Aerialist	Sofia	3	Eliminated
Dea Tsvetanova, Dimitar Georgiev, Raya Kurtova & Ivan Donkov	14, 16, 12 & 11	Dancesport group	Sofia & Asenovgrad	3	Eliminated
Dimitar Mirchev	18	Acrobatic dancer	Kalofer	1	Eliminated
Eduard Gavrilov	12	Magician	Sofia	2	Eliminated
Emilio & Leandro Ponce	—N/a	Comedian performers duo	Argentina	3	Eliminated
"Estrella"	9–21	Dance group	Burgas	3	Finalist
Fanka Borisova	46	Painter	Various	2	Finalist
Filip Donkov	15	Singer	Sofia	3	Eliminated
Georgi Kostadinov	22	Comedian performer	Sofia	1	Eliminated
Grupa "oHo"	—N/a	Music group	Sofia	2	Eliminated
Ivaylo Martinov & Elise Patterson	31 & 24	Dancesport duo	Haskovo & Sheffield, England	—N/a	Finalist
Kiril Trifonov	35	Danger act	Plovdiv	2	Eliminated
Konstantin Chervenkov	10	Mental calculator	Gotse Delchev	—N/a	Winner
Kristina Kostova	23	Speedcuber	Sofia	—N/a	Runner-Up
Luca Lombardo	41	Quick-change artist	Naples, Italy	2	Eliminated
"Manal & the Misfits"	—N/a	Musical theatre troupe	Various	2	Eliminated
"Monstribe"	—N/a	Breakdance group	Vratsa	2	Eliminated
Nikolay Dimitrov	13	Entomologist	Stara Zagora	1	Eliminated
Ognyan Dimitrov	7	Michael Jackson dance impersonator	Sofia	—N/a	Finalist
Petra Kirilova	14	Aerialist	Sofia	2	Finalist
Porter Ballard	23	Jump rope performer	United States	3	Eliminated
Siyana Zoneva	12	Singer	Karlovo	1	Eliminated
Sofia Reichert	19	Artistic cycler	Germany & Sofia	3	Eliminated
Stoyo Stoev	34	Bagpiper	General Toshevo	3	Eliminated
Teodor Dzhabrailov	18	Guitarist	Sevlievo	1	Eliminated
Teodora Marcheva	25	Opera singer	Sofia	3	Eliminated
"UP:NEXT"	—N/a	K-pop dance group	Sofia	2	Eliminated
Victoria Kamencheva	15	Singer	Rakovski	2	Eliminated
"Yunatsi"	—N/a	Folklore dance group	Straldzha	—N/a	Finalist
"Zharava"	—N/a	Folklore choir	Stara Zagora	1	Finalist

Buzzed out | Judges' vote | Won the Public's Vote | Won the Judges' Vote
Lost Judges' Vote | Originally eliminated, but later saved by the public online | Eliminated

==== Semi-final 1 (November 23) ====
Semi-Finalist	Order	Performance Type	Buzzes and judges' votes				Finished
Semi-Finalist	Order	Performance Type	Niko	Kateto	Galena	Juli	Finished
"Creators"	1	Dance group					1st (Won Public Vote)
Daniele & Naimana	2	Ventriloquist duo					Eliminated
Dimitar Mirchev	3	Acrobatic dancer					Eliminated
Siyana Zoneva	4	Singer					Eliminated
Teodor Dzhabrailov	5	Guitarist					3rd (Lost Judges' Vote)
Anna Vasilevich	6	Acrobatic dancer					Eliminated
"Benda bez ime"	7	Music group					Eliminated
Arina Shilo	8	Pantomime actress					Advanced (Won Second Chance Vote)
Georgi Kostadinov	9	Comedian performer					Eliminated
"Balkanski bliznatsi"	10	Dance duo					Eliminated
Nikolay Dimitrov	11	Entomologist					Eliminated
"Zharava"	12	Folklore choir		^{1}			2nd (Won Judges' Vote)

- ^1 Katerina Evro did not cast her vote due to the majority support for Zharava.

==== Semi-final 2 (November 30) ====
Semi-Finalist	Order	Performance Type	Buzzes and judges' votes				Finished
Semi-Finalist	Order	Performance Type	Niko	Kateto	Galena	Juli	Finished
Grupa "oHo"	1	Music group					Eliminated
Eduard Gavrilov	2	Magician					Eliminated
"UP:NEXT"	3	K-pop dance group					3rd (Lost Judges' Vote)
Chirag Lukha	4	Danger act					Eliminated
"Monstribe"	5	Breakdance group					Eliminated
Fanka Borisova	6	Painter					1st (Won Public Vote)
Kiril Trifonov	7	Danger act					Eliminated
Luca Lombardo	8	Quick-change artist					Eliminated
"Manal & the Misfits"	9	Musical theatre troupe					Eliminated
"Battle of Legends"	10	Calisthenics group					Eliminated
Victoria Kamencheva	11	Singer					Eliminated
Petra Kirilova	12	Aerialist					2nd (Won Judges' Vote)

==== Semi-final 3 (December 7) ====
Semi-Finalist	Order	Performance Type	Buzzes and judges' votes				Finished
Semi-Finalist	Order	Performance Type	Niko	Kateto	Galena	Juli	Finished
Boyan Georgiev	1	Singer					Eliminated
Emilio & Leandro Ponce	2	Comedian performers duo					Eliminated
Dea, Dimitar, Raya & Ivan	3	Dancesport group					Eliminated
Teodora Marcheva	4	Opera singer					Eliminated
Porter Ballard	5	Jump rope performer					Eliminated
Chavdar Iliev	6	Reciter					2nd (Judges' Vote tied – Won on Public Vote)
Sofia Reichert	7	Artistic cycler					Eliminated
Stoyo Stoev	8	Bagpiper					3rd (Judges' Vote tied – Lost on Public Vote)
Arina Shvets	9	Gymnast					Eliminated
Filip Donkov	10	Singer					Eliminated
Delyan Furchanov	11	Aerialist					Eliminated
"Estrella"	12	Dance group					1st (Won Public Vote)

==== Final ====
Winner | Runner-up | Third place

Finalist	Order	Performance Type	Finished
Chavdar Iliev	1	Reciter	Finalist
Ivaylo & Elise	2	Dancesport duo	Finalist
Ognyan Dimitrov	3	Michael Jackson dance impersonator	Finalist
Petra Kirilova	4	Aeralist	Finalist
Fanka Borisova	5	Painter	Finalist
"Creators"	6	Dance group	Third place
Konstantin Chervenkov	7	Mental calculator	Winner
"Zharava"	8	Folklore choir	Finalist
"Yunatsi"	9	Folklore dance group	Finalist
Arina Shilo	10	Pantomime actress	Finalist
"Estrella"	11	Dance group	Finalist
Kristina Kostova	12	Speedcuber	Runner-up

== Episodes ==
Ep. #	Episode	Airdate
1	Auditions 1	September 14, 2025
2	Auditions 2	September 21, 2025
3	Auditions 3	September 28, 2025
4	Auditions 4	October 5, 2025
5	Auditions 5	October 12, 2025
6	Auditions 6	October 19, 2025
7	Auditions 7	October 26, 2025
8	Auditions 8	November 2, 2025
9	Auditions 9	November 9, 2025
10	Auditions 10	November 16, 2025
11	Semi-final 1	November 23, 2025
12	Semi-final 2	November 30, 2025
13	Semi-final 3	December 7, 2025
14	Final	December 14, 2025
