= Wyjście z cienia =

1983 novel by Janusz A. Zajdel

First edition

Wyjście z cienia (English critics variously translated the title as Coming out of the Shadow, Out of the Shadow, Leaving the Shadow, etc.) is a 1983 science fiction novel by Polish writer Janusz A. Zajdel.

It belongs to the genre of social science fiction of dystopia type and describes the future of the Earth under control of the aliens.

== Edition history ==
Finished in 1978, it was first printed in 1983 by Czytelnik Publishing House.

== Analysis ==
In the introduction to the book, the author reveals that the plot of the novel is an evolution of an idea found in the short story Solidarność by Julia Nidecka.

The circumstances of the novel is a thinly veiled allusion on the Communist regime in Poland: the aliens claim that their invasion is in fact in defense of the Earth against other "bad" aliens; at the first glance the society as a whole is content: all goods are fairly distributed, the economy is stable, etc., if one disregards certain restrictions imposed by the aliens: certain territories are off limits for humans, research in ants is forbidden, development of the technology is banned, etc. Human leaders are convinced that aliens "know better", that an external point of view was necessary to bring things in order. The reviewer Jan Bodakowski notes that the latter arguments were repeated almost literally by Polish politicians who pushed for integration into the European Union.

Another critic notes the parallel with the stationing of the Soviet Army in Poland, including its eventual demoralization.

The novel includes features of a bildungsroman: The life story of protagonist Tim illustrates the growth of the resistance among teenagers and young scientists. It was suggested that the young age of the protagonist was chosen keeping in mind the target audience.
