= Cała prawda o planecie Ksi =

The Whole Truth about Planet Xi
- Author: Janusz Zajdel
- Original title: Cała prawda o planecie Ksi
- Language: Polish
- Genre: Social science fiction
- Publication date: 1983
- Publication place: Poland

Cała prawda o planecie Ksi (1983) (the title has been translated to English as The Whole Truth about Planet Xi as well as The Complete Truth about Planet Xi) is a social science fiction novel by Polish writer Janusz A. Zajdel about the first colony of the Earth beyond the Solar System, whose hibernated settlers were taken over by terrorists during the flight. The colony is visited by the inspectors arriving in secret to discover why they do not answer any messages from the Earth. The novel covers the problems of political systems, terrorism and the manipulation of power, and includes multiple allusions to the People's Republic of Poland.

Zajdel planned a continuation of the novel, however he abandoned the idea. Its sketch and three chapters were found in Zajdel's archives after his death. In 2011 the heirs of the author and the SuperNOWA publisher announced an open competition to complete the novel under the title of Drugie spojrzenie na planetę Ksi (A Second Look at the Planet Xi). In 2012 the winner was announced, Marcin Kowalczyk from Bydgoszcz, and his book was published in 2014.
