= Hristo Petrov =

Bulgarian rapper and politician

- Христо Петров
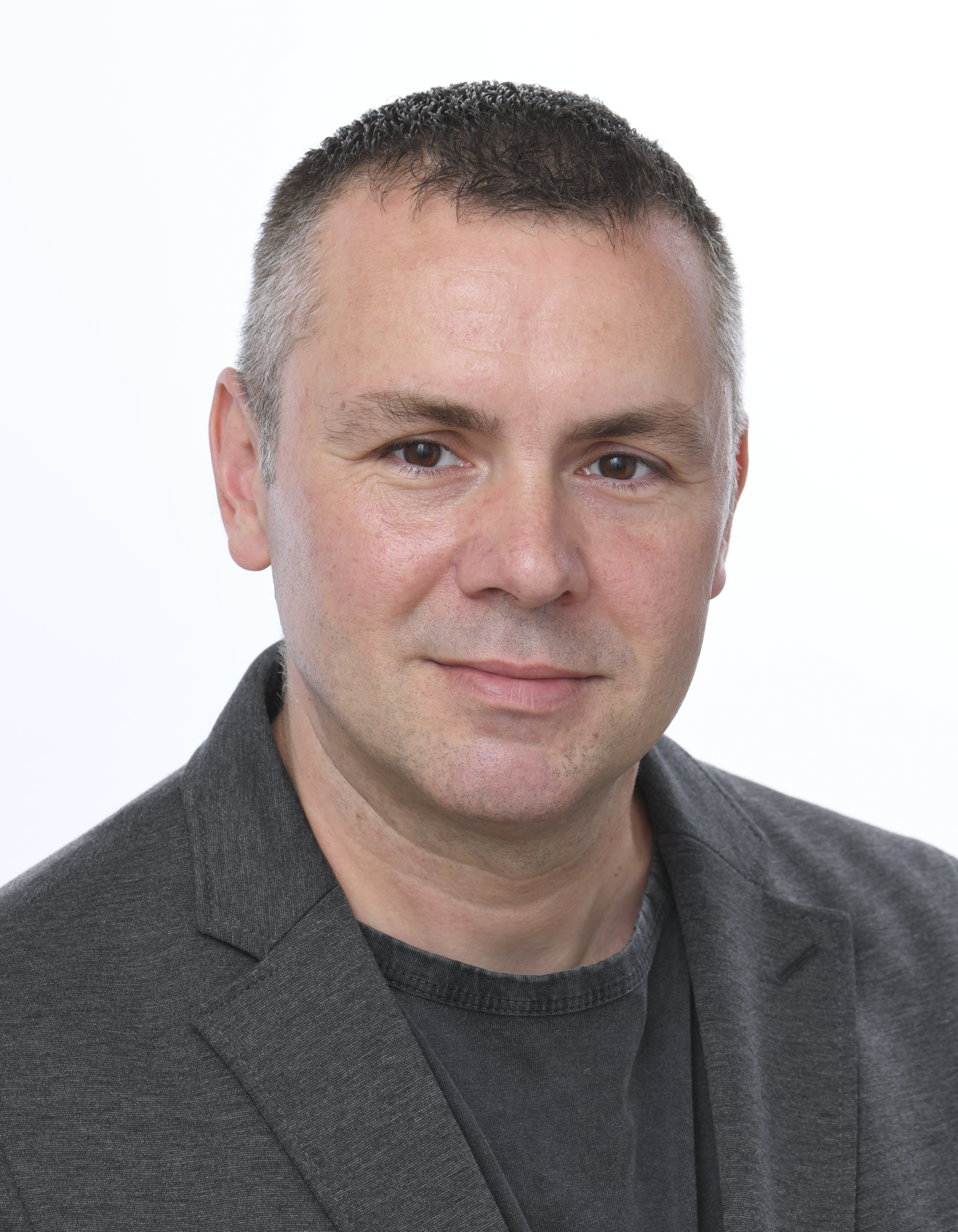
- Official portrait, 2021

Member of the European Parliament for Bulgaria
- Incumbent
- Assumed office 16 July 2024

Member of the National Assembly
- In office 3 December 2021 – 19 June 2024
- Constituency: 25th MMC - Sofia

Personal details
- Born: Hristo Hristov Petrov; 19 December 1979 (age 46) Sofia, PR Bulgaria
- Party: We Continue the Change (since 2021)
- Other political affiliations: Renew Europe
- Children: 3
- Education: NGDEK
- Occupation: Politician; rapper

Hristo Hristov Petrov (Bulgarian: Христо Христов Петров; born 19 December 1979), also known by his stage name Itso Hazarta (Bulgarian: Ицо Хазарта), is a Bulgarian rapper and politician who was elected MEP at the 2024 European Parliament election. A member of the PP party, he served as Member of the National Assembly from 2021 to 2024. Petrov is still actively involved in rapping and is famous for the Upsurt hip-hop band he co-founded. He was also a judge in Balgariya tarsi talant season 5 (2016), season 6 (2019) and season 7 (2021).

== Biography ==
He was born in Sofia, the capital of Bulgaria. He has a sister named Natalia, who is eight years older than him. Hristo graduated from the 76th school "Lyubcho Baramov" in Sofia, and then the National High School for Ancient Languages and Cultures "Konstantin Kiril Philosopher". He applied to the New Bulgarian University and was accepted in the specialty "Public Administration", but after 2 years he interrupted his studies due to his musical activities.

He is the key figure in one of the most popular Bulgarian rap groups - Upsurt. The author of most of the lyrics is Itso Hazarta. Upsurt made its first recordings in January 1996. Upsurt's rise began in November 1997, when the group won first place at a rap festival in Razgrad in competition with 26 groups from all over Bulgaria. In October 2000, after an eight-month tour around the country, the group released a new single from its second album. The song of the same name is called "Chekai malko" (it became the band's first superhit), and the album was released in 2001.

Itso Hazarta's lyrics have also become a topic of academic researchers. In 2004–2005, the theoretical seminar of the Department of New Bulgarian Studies at the NBU, entitled "Literature in the End", also held the first academic discussions on Bulgarian rap culture – with a focus on Upsurt. In 2009, Itso Hazarta participated in the reality show Vip Brother, finishing in 5th place. He is a member of the jury in season 5 (2016), season 6 (2019) and season 7 (2021) of Bulgaria's Got Talent.

In the third parliamentary elections in 2021, Itso Hazarta ran for MP as the leader of the "Продължаваме Промяната" ("We continue the change") list in 25 MIR-Sofia. The list he led defeated that of GERB, headed by party leader and former Prime Minister Boyko Borisov, as well as the list of the Bulgarian Socialist Party (BSP) headed by party leader Cornelia Ninova.

In the 2024 European elections, he was elected as an MEP.

== Acting career ==
In 2007 he voiced Leonardo in the Bulgarian dub of the popular animated film "Teenage Mutant Ninja Turtles", recorded in the studio "Alexandra Audio", led by Tanya Mihailova.

In 2019 he voiced Red in "Angry birds: The Movie 2"

== Personal life ==
On April 24, 2004, Petrov married his girlfriend Diana, of whom he has a daughter with, but they got a divorce three years later. He has two more daughters from ballet dancer and choreographer of "Nova", Zhenya Dimova.

== Discography ==
=== Albums (Upsurt) ===
- Bozdugan (1999)
- Chekai malko (Чекай малко) (2001)
- Pop-folk (2003)
- Quattro (2005)
- Upsurt – Live (2006)

=== Solo albums ===
- Неправилен рап (Nepravilen rap) (2019)
