= Koalang =

Fictional language

Koalang is a fictional language in Janusz A. Zajdel's 1984 novel Paradyzja. The novel is set on a space station where activity is tracked by automatic cameras and analysed, mostly, by computers. To avoid surveillance, the station's inhabitants adopt an Aesopian language which is full of metaphors that are impossible for computers to grasp. The meaning of every sentence depended on the context. For example, "I dreamt about blue angels last night" means "I was visited by the police last night."

The software that analyzes sentences is self-learning. Thus, a phrase that is used to describe something metaphorically should not be used again in the same context.

The ko-al in koalang derives from the Polish words kojarzeniowo-aluzyjny ("associative-allusive"). Zajdel paid tribute to George Orwell's Newspeak and to Aldous Huxley by naming one of the main characters Nikor Orley Huxwell.

In the 1980s, the youth magazine Na Przełaj ("Short Cut") printed rock lyrics in a column titled KOALANG, hinting that the songs' texts contained content camouflaged from censorship.

== See also ==
- Algospeak
- Darmok
- Metaphorical language
