= Slavena Vatova =

Bulgarian model (born 1989)

- Born: Slavena Vatova; 12 April 1989 (age 37); Shumen, Bulgaria
- Occupations: Model & Student studying Economy
- Height: 1.75 m (5 ft 9 in)
- Beauty pageant titleholder
- Title: Miss Bulgaria 2006
- Hair color: Brown
- Major competitions: Miss World Bulgaria 2006; Miss World 2006

Slavena Vatova (Bulgarian: Славена Вътова, born 1989) is a Bulgarian model and beauty pageant titleholder who won the title of Miss Bulgaria 2006.

In 2005, Slavena won the Miss Black Sea contest and a year later in 2006 she was selected as Miss Bulgaria. She represented her country at Miss World 2006. In 2019, she became part of the jury in the program Balgariya tarsi talant.

Awards and achievements
Preceded by Rositsa Ivanova	Miss Bulgaria; 2006	Succeeded by Yuliya Yurevich
