= Cylinder van Troffa =

1980 novel by Janusz A. Zajdel

Van Troff's Cylinder
- First edition (Polish)
- Author: Janusz A. Zajdel
- Original title: Cylinder van Troffa
- Language: Polish
- Series: Z kosmonautą
- Publisher: Czytelnik
- Publication date: 1980
- Publication place: Poland
- Pages: 240
- ISBN: 83-07-00111-0

Cylinder van Troffa (the title of the work has been rendered in English as Van Troff's Cylinder as well as The Cylinder of Van Troff) is a social science fiction novel by Polish writer Janusz A. Zajdel. The novel covers the problems of time travel, society development, eugenics and isolated societies. At the time of its release it was treated as a warning for totalitarian systems.

Its first publication was serialized by Kurier Szczeciński newspaper, issues 209-291, 1978. In book form it was published by Czytelnik in 1980.

== Plot synopsis ==
The plot covers a story of a group of astronauts who are approaching Earth after a 200-year-long journey on a long-distance spaceship called "Helios". Instead of reaching Earth, they are communicated by people living in the Moon's underground colony, and convinced to land there. After landing they get isolated, and they quickly find out that the colony is ruled by an authoritarian regime, which tends to control all the people living there by means of censorship from one hand, and denunciation from the other one. Also, to make the colony's population stable, there is strict birth control there, and people over the age of 60 get "retired", which in fact means senicide.

The colony's officials give vague explanations to the reason on why "Helios" has been diverted to land on the Moon instead of on its original destination, Earth. Initially it is only said that it is "not feasible", or "pointless" to go to Earth now. Gradually "Helios"' crew find out that the Earth's population underwent some process of degeneration (the cause, however, not being revealed), that the Earth's inhabitants are expected to die out quickly, and that the Moon colonies were constructed as a sort of asylum for the non-degenerated part of humanity, which is also expected to recolonize Earth when the crisis will have ended. The crew, however, can already see that the Moon's inhabitants are undergoing some degeneration process as well (skeletal, due to lighter gravity on the Moon, but also mental due to living permanently underground, which leads to chronic agoraphobia) and this finding in turn casts doubts on the planned recolonization. Also, they find out that even the regime itself does not know about the current situation on the Earth, because any bilateral communication was cut long time ago.

The astronauts arrange an escape for one of them, the book's protagonist. He lands near a city, whose name is not mentioned, but some details suggest Warsaw. The suburbs are in devastated state (it is said, that the devastation looks intentional) and are inhabited by a mob which creeps out apparently only at night to catch something to eat. The centre of the city is in turn inhabited by aggressive youngsters, their main occupation being apparently struggling between themselves and hunting for the individuals of the aforementioned suburban mob, in order to just kill them. Both the mob and the youngsters, as observed by the protagonist, are males only.

Despite that, the city is fully automated, robots cleaning the streets and facilities, fixing any damaged equipment, providing food for humans and (as it gradually turns out) for rats, which occupy lower parts of the city and are intelligent enough to use underground trains or food-providing machines.

Initially, the aim of the protagonist is to collect information about the Earth's situation, share it with the rest of the "Helios"' crew who are remaining on the Moon, and arrange an escape also for them. But his main aim - which he is keeping secret from everyone - is to find the "Van Troff's cylinder", a secret chamber (built before "Helios" started its journey to space) in which prof. Van Troff had managed to reproduce the effect of time dilatation.

== Translations ==
The book was translated into Bulgarian by Lina Vasileva and published by Georgi Bakalov publishing house (bul. Цилиндърът на ван Троф) in 1983.

Helena Stachová was an author of Czech translation (cz. Vynález profesora van Troffa). Published in 1983.

Several Russian translations were published under the title Цилиндр Ван Троффа, The first one by R. Kuśnierz [ Р. Куснеш] was published in 1981 in magazine Польша [Poland], no. 8.
