= Kazuhisa Uekusa =

Japanese comedian

- 植草 和久
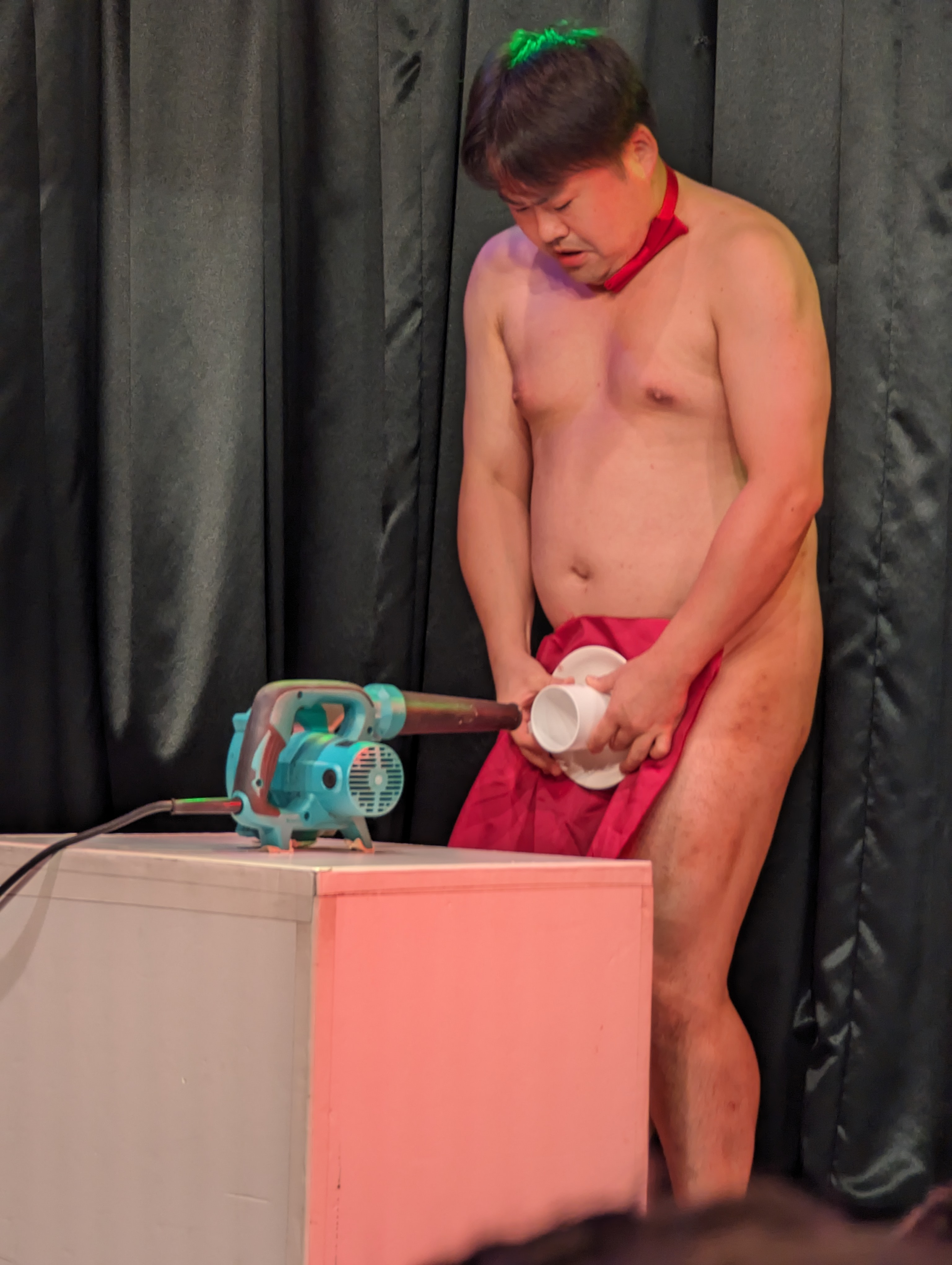
- Uekusa performing at the Yoshimoto Mugendai Hall in 2023
- Born: November 15, 1987 (age 38); Ageo, Saitama Prefecture, Japan
- Other names: Wes-P; Mr Uekusa
- Occupation: Comedian
- Years active: 2017–present
- Notable credits: America's Got Talent; Britain’s Got Talent; Spain's Got Talent; Georgia's Got Talent; France's Got Talent

Kazuhisa Uekusa (Japanese: 植草和久; born 15 November 1987), known by the stage names of Wes-P (Japanese: ウエスP) or Mr Uekusa, is a Japanese entertainer who has gone viral on Twitter and TikTok. He is known for performing risque prop comic versions of the tablecloth trick.

== Career ==
Uekusa is from Ageo, Saitama Prefecture in Japan. He first gained prominence in 2017 after a gag video he posted to Twitter went viral. That year, he reached the semi-finals of Georgia's Got Talent. In 2018, Uekusa performed on ¡Tú sí que vales!. Later that year, he reached the semi-finals of Britain’s Got Talent and made it to the finale of France's Got Talent.

In 2019, Uekusa performed on Spain's Got Talent. He also performed on Asia's Got Talent as part of the superhero-themed comedy troupe "Bad X Ten".

In 2022, Uekusa made an appearance on Bulgaria's Got Talent. He also joined the "Yoshimoto Comedy Squad", a Japanese YouTube collective that focuses on non-verbal, improvisational comedy. On December 15, 2022, he made an appearance on The Late Late Show with James Corden as a year-end surprise for host James Corden, who had previously called Uekusa his favorite guest who had never actually been on the show; many of his video stunts had been featured in previous segments featuring compilations of viral videos.

In March 2023, Uekusa was portrayed by Bowen Yang in a skit on Saturday Night Live.
