= Paradyzja =

1984 novel by Janusz Zajdel

First edition (publ. Iskry)

Paradyzja (the title has been translated to English as Paradisia as well as Paradise, the World in Orbit) is a 1984 science fiction novel by Polish writer Janusz A. Zajdel.

It is a dystopian novel similar to George Orwell's Nineteen Eighty-Four. The space colonies are more or less federated with the Earth. Human rights are observed and respected everywhere, but Paradise has not been verified for sure.

The main hero, writer Rinah Devi, is sent from Earth to Paradise to research that and the tragic death of a Terran sent to Paradise ten years before. Officially, though, the purpose of his visit is to write about Paradise.

It was recognized as the best science fiction novel of the year in Poland in 1984. In the Polish People's Republic, it was widely understood as a metaphor for the USSR: omnipotent state security services and propaganda, single state ideology and forced labour.

== Plot ==
Paradyzja (from "paradise") is the story about the human colony on a space station orbiting a distant and mineral rich star system. The colony is controlled by a totalitarian regime. All human activity is tracked by electronic devices. It had been primarily devised as a ring in which the gravity force is simulated by the centrifugal force exerting upon all objects inside a ring tube in the direction opposite to the centre of the ring. The space station was built accidentally. The expedition had to settle on the planet Tartar in order to live there and exploit the natural goods. But General Cortazar, the leader of settlers, decided that Tartar was not suitable for settling because of a lack of good conditions for living, so the living place had to be built as a space station on the Tartar's orbit.

On Paradise, living rooms are made of transparent material and to get to some of them, one must pass through other living rooms. Personal watches are not allowed there; the only clocks are those in living rooms. Rinah Devi's first impression is that all people strictly adhere to the regime law, but he then discovers that they had devised various ways to work around the system. One of them is "the only language of truth", Koalang, an artificial poetic language invented by the inhabitants of Paradise to evade the electronic eavesdropping system.

The government and the safety service is trying to suppress all possible knowledge of physics, which could allow verification of the statements about what Paradise is as presented to Paradisians. That is why all research in physics is blocked, especially all research about the Coriolis force. The main hero discovered it when he was trying to check whether the forces really differ on every floor: all things that would be used to make such an experiment, even such as a spring from his ballpen, have been taken from him by the customs officers and no other things that would make such a simple experiment possible are accessible. Then, he discovers that the minutes on the clocks in living rooms are not equal in length.

Finally, he finds out that Paradise is not a ring-tube space station but a train of buildings lying on the surface of the planet. In addition, Tartar is a planet quite well suitable for settlement, and the group in charge built some buildings and gardens for itself and kept the majority of settlers in the fictional Paradise and made them believe that it was an artificial planet.
