= Aesopian language =

Communications intended for insiders of a group

Aesopian language is a means of communication with the intent to convey a concealed meaning to informed members of a conspiracy or underground movement, whilst simultaneously maintaining the guise of an innocent meaning to outsiders. The terminology refers to the allegorical writings of ancient Greek fabulist Aesop.

== History ==
The term Aesopian language was first used by the nineteenth-century Russian writer Mikhail Saltykov-Shchedrin to describe the writing technique he began using late in his career, which he compared to that of Aesop's Fables. His purpose was to satirize the social ills of the time while evading the harsh censorship of the late Tsarist Russia, of which he was a particular target.

The Soviet-era writer Lev Loseff noted that the use of Aesopian language remained a favorite technique of writers (including himself) under Soviet censorship. Maliheh Tyrell defines the term in the Soviet context, and observes that the use of Aesopian language extended to other national literatures under Soviet rule:

In short, this form of literature, like Aesop's animal fables, veils itself in allegorical suggestions, hints, and euphemisms so as to elude political censorship. 'Aesopian language' or literature is a technical term used by Sovietologists to define allegorical language used by Russian or nationality [that is: non-Russian] nonconformist publicists to conceal antiregime sentiments. Under Soviet rule, this 'Aesopian' literature intended to confuse the Soviet authorities, yet illuminate the truth for native readers.

According to one critic, "Censorship ... had a positive, formative impact upon the Aesopian writers' style by obliging them to sharpen their thoughts."

The German-American philosopher Herbert Marcuse uses the term in his book One-Dimensional Man somewhat interchangeably with Orwellian language. In that context, Aesopian language refers to the idea that certain usages of language work to "suppress certain concepts or keep them out of the general discourse within society". An example of such a technique is the use of abbreviations to possibly prevent undesirable questions from arising: "AFL–CIO entombs the radical political differences which once separated the two organizations."

Within the context of modern politics, parallels may be drawn between Aesopian language and the term dog-whistle politics, which describes the use of coded language to address voters' interests, whilst shielding them from negative political blowback if overtly addressed.

== See also ==
- Persecution and the Art of Writing
- Doublespeak
- Gibberish
- Koalang
- Obscurantism
- Plausible deniability
- Pun
- Shibboleth
