= Encho Keryazov =

Bulgarian acrobat (born 1973)

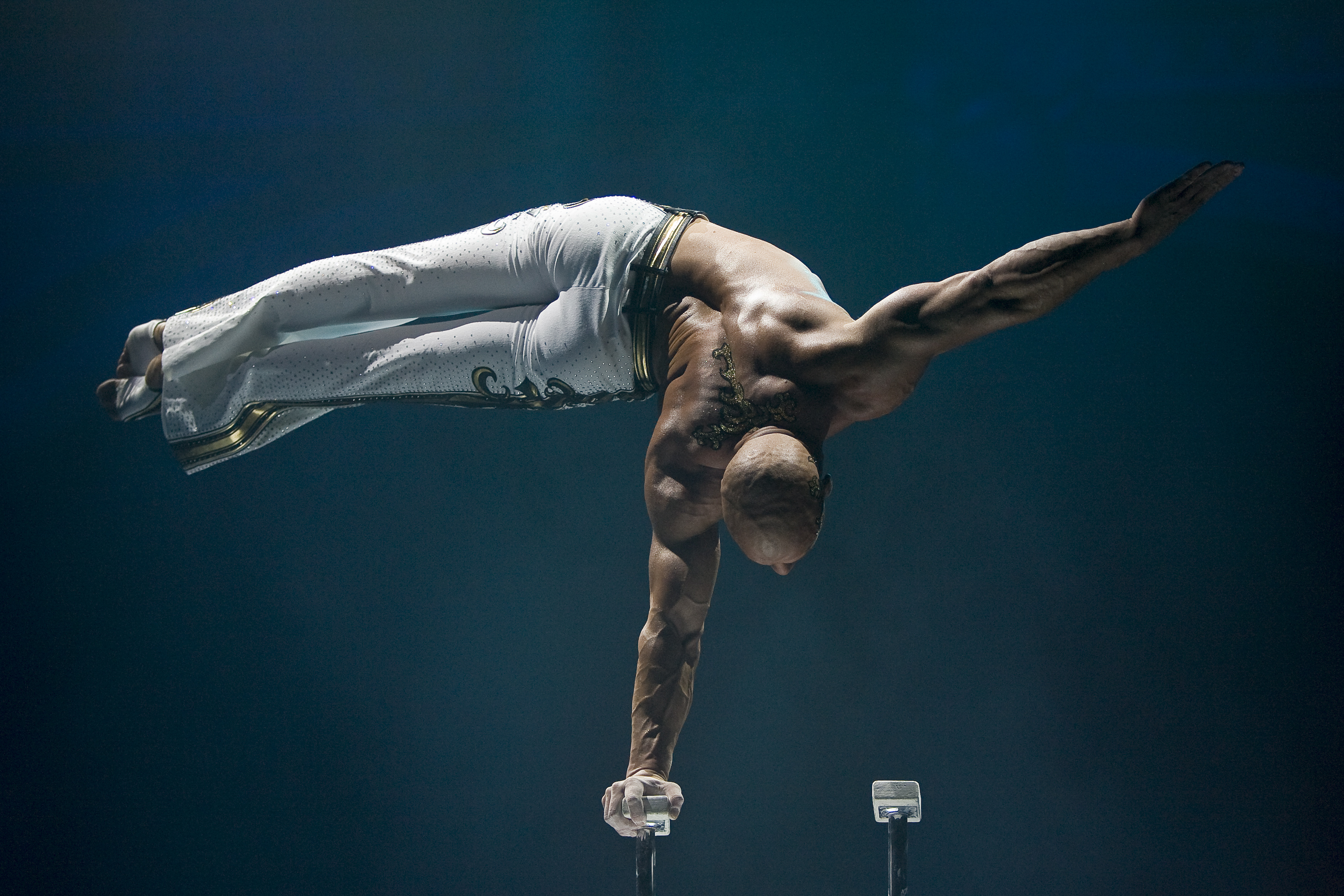
The legendary handstand acrobatic by Encho Keryazov

Encho Keryazov (Bulgarian: Енчо Керязов; born 15 October 1973) is a Bulgarian acrobat and politician.

== Biography ==
Born into a family of teachers, Encho Keryazov was born in 1973 in Elhovo, Bulgaria. At the age of 6 he was a rather frail boy, so his mother had the idea of starting to train him and he began acrobatic training at a local sports club. At first he did not meet the physical prerequisites, however, his upcoming ambition and obvious talent finally convinced his trainers he was capable. At the age of 14 Keryazov was Youth Champion in Sport Acrobatics, the following year he was a member of the Bulgarian national team and national champion of sports acrobatics.

As a 16-year-old he had his first real contact with a circus and joined the jockey cavalry troupe "Romanovi" and he traveled throughout Europe for seven years.

In the following year Keryazov developed an independent equilibristics act. With the presentation of a very special handstand acrobatic act he has won prizes in England, the Netherlands, France and Germany. One of the temporary highlights of his career was winning the Audience Award and the "Silver Clown" at the International Circus Festival of Monte-Carlo in 2007. In 2011 he received the highest award of the Bulgarian Artists Association, the "IKAR" and became an honorary citizen of his home town of Yambol.

In 2011 he founded the Foundation Encho Keryazov, with the support of other Bulgarian celebrities, which promotes talented young people engaged in science, arts and sports, giving creative and financial support. The Foundation has gained national and international attention, so that the annual awards, held since 2012 in Keryazov's hometown Yambol, where the awards are given to children and young people, are in the presence of the Bulgarian Minister of Foreign Affairs Kristian Vigenin, the Minister of Culture Weschdi Raschidow and ambassadors from Germany and the Netherlands. During the charity gala in January 2015 he gathered high-level international circus artists in Yambol, including the clown David Larible. The preliminary peak of his social commitment is a benefit-gala in Sofia in February 2016, which he organizes with his friend and supporter of the foundation, Yordan Yovchev (Olympic gold medalist and President of the Bulgarian Sports Federation) to collect more financial resources for the Foundation.

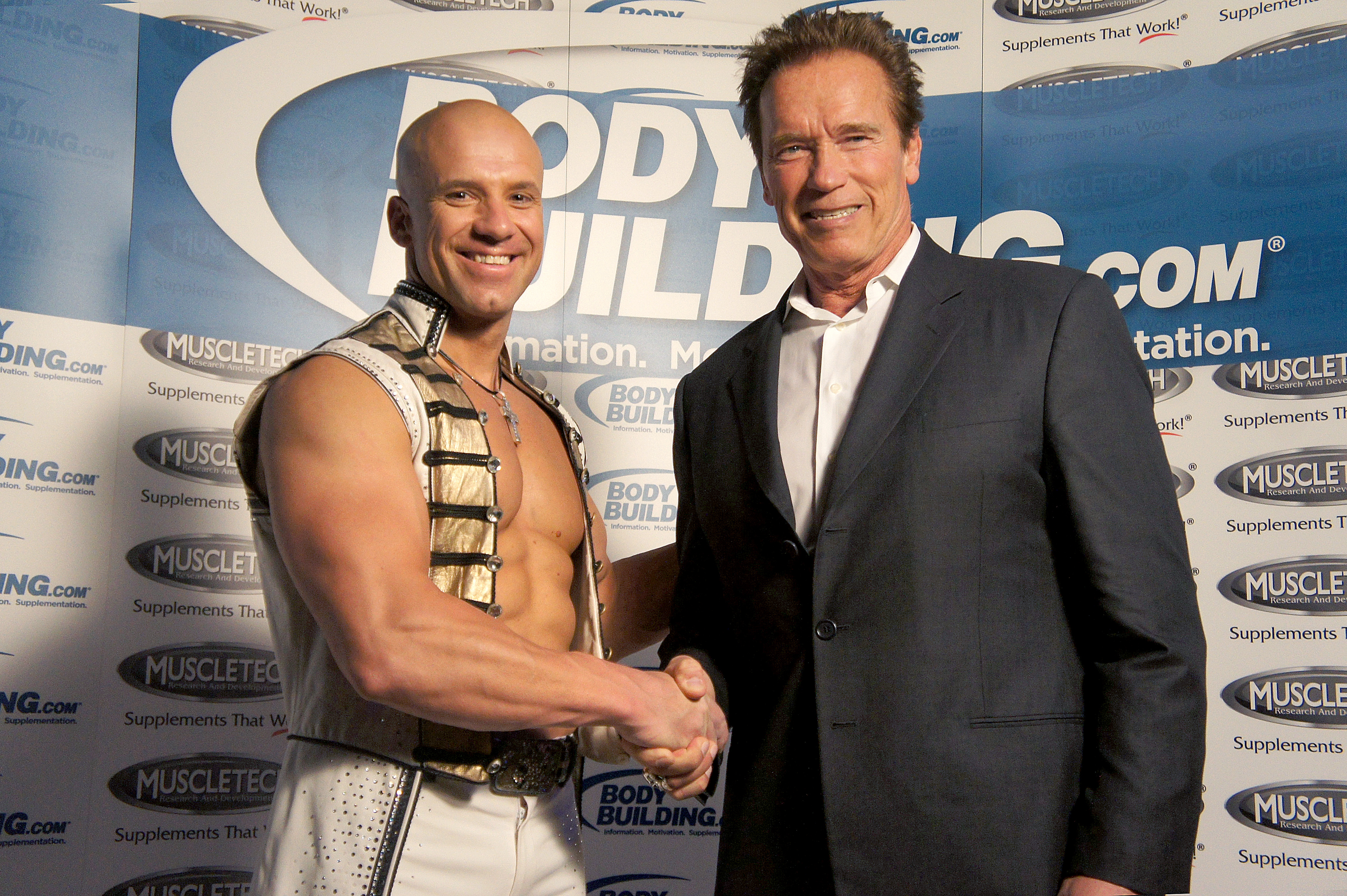
Encho Keryazov and Arnold Schwarzenegger

As part of a special edition Keryazov appeared alongside other artists Circus Roncalli on an Austrian stamp.

In 2011 he was a jury member in the television show "Bulgaria's got talent". In January 2012, a 45-minute documentary about Keryazovs life and career was broadcast on the television station bTV (Bulgaria), directed by Georgi Tochev. His engagement at the famous Circus Roncalli in Germany and various performances, such as a sporting gala by Arnold Schwarzenegger in the USA 2012 and 2014, give Encho Keryazov consistent international recognition.

On 24 May 2012, the Day of Bulgarian Enlightenment and Culture and Slavonic Literature (this public celebratory event is closely linked to the development of the Cyrillic alphabet, Cyrillic Alphabet Day), Keryazov was at the suggestion of the Bulgarian Ministry of Culture awarded the "Golden Age" for outstanding contribution to Bulgarian culture and awarded funding of Bulgarian art and culture abroad.

Encho Keryazov has two sons, who are already working on their own acrobatic performance.

Keryazov established a successful trampoline sports club in Bulgaria. At the end of October 2013 he joined the "Palazzo" in Mannheim, Germany, for the 2014 season he was engaged at the Swiss National Circus Circus Knie and since 2015 in the United States at Vazquez Hermanos Circus.

In October 2015 he won the voting on the BUDITEL 2015, a prize awarded from the Bulgarian radio station FM Plus. The prize honors people with great spiritual impact by extraordinary social commitment for people. Invited by Princess Stephanie of Monaco, he will participate in the anniversary show of the 40th Circus Festival in Monaco 2016 under the slogan "the best of the best". 2016 Admitted to the World Acrobatic Society's Legacy Gallery at a ceremony in Las Vegas.

In 2019 Keryazov became Deputy Mayor of the Yambol District and since 2026 he is the Minister of Youth and Sports in the Radev Government.

== Prizes and awards ==
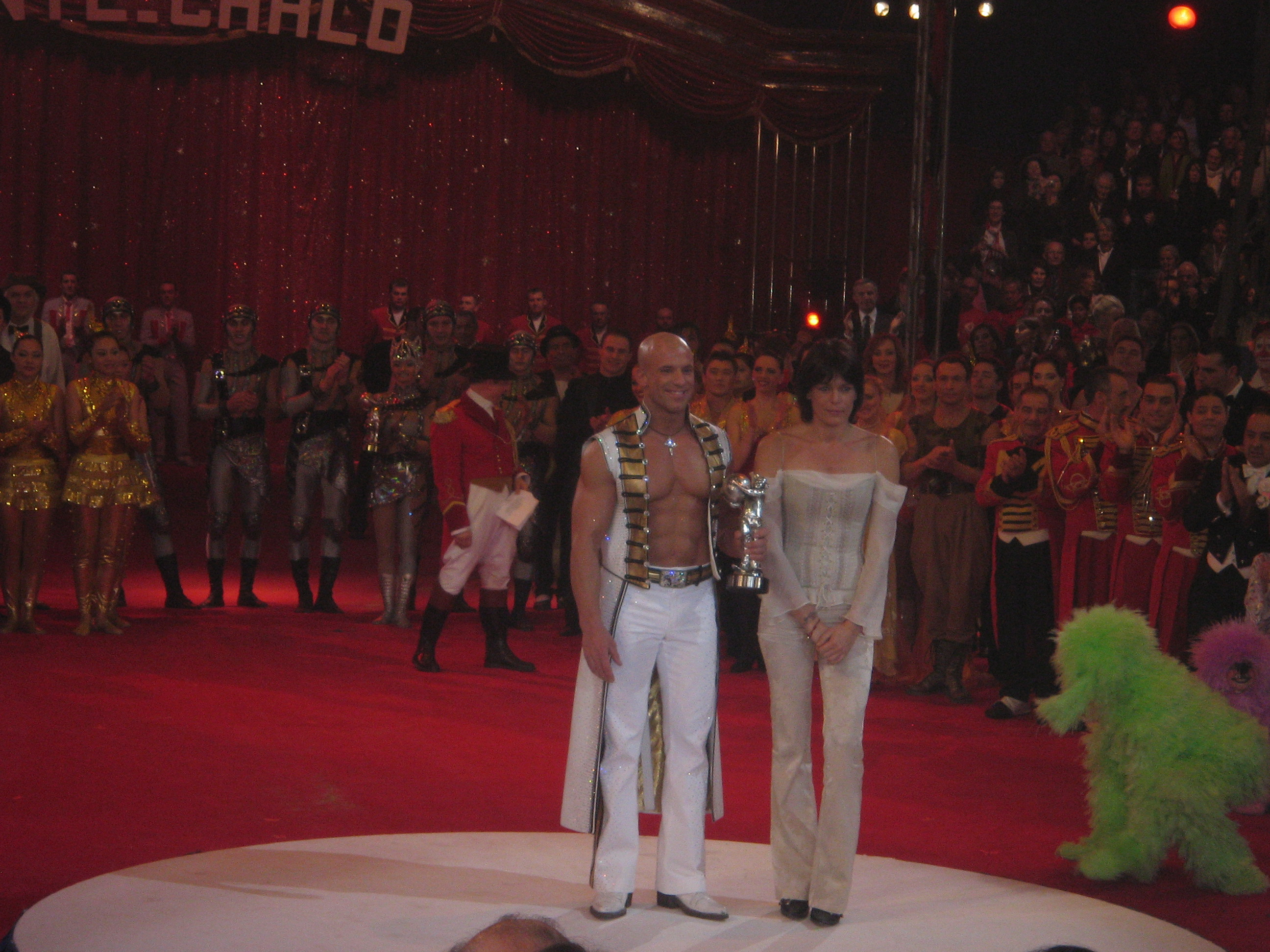
Award ceremony „silver clown“ by princess Princess Stéphanie of Monaco (2007)

- 2002: first prize at festival „Herman Renz und Diana“ – Netherlands
- 2002: circus artist of the year - Netherlands
- 2004: circus artist of the year - Netherlands
- 2004: audience award at the festival „Herman Renz und Diana“ – Netherlands
- 2005: circus artist of the year - Germany
- 2006: Silver Star at the international circus festival in Grenoble, France
- 2007: international circus festival in Monte Carlo:
  - „silver clown“
  - audience award
  - given by Stardust Circus International
- 2011: IKAR – highest award of the Bulgarian artist-organization
- 2011: honorary citizen of Yambol
- 2012: Golden Age for outstanding contributions to the promotion of Bulgarian culture and Bulgarian art and culture abroad
- 2013: silver bear at the 6. international circus festival in Ischewsk
- 2015: „BUDITEL 2015“ awarded by the Bulgarian radio station FM+ for common engagement with a "strong spiritual message"
- 2016: Admitted to the World Acrobatic Society's Legacy Gallery at a ceremony in Las Vegas.
