= Elhovo =

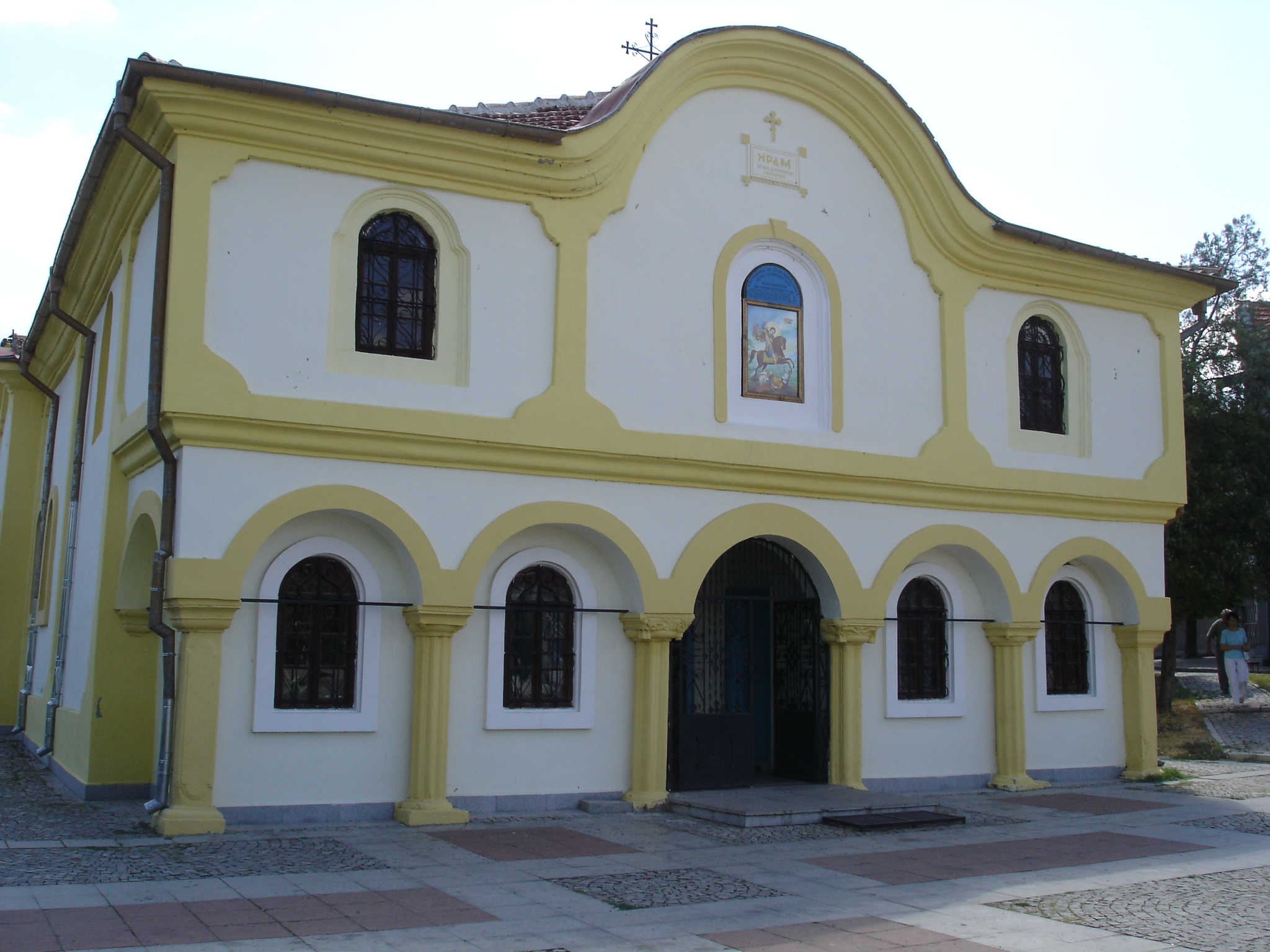
- St. Demetrius of Thessaloniki Church in Elhovo.

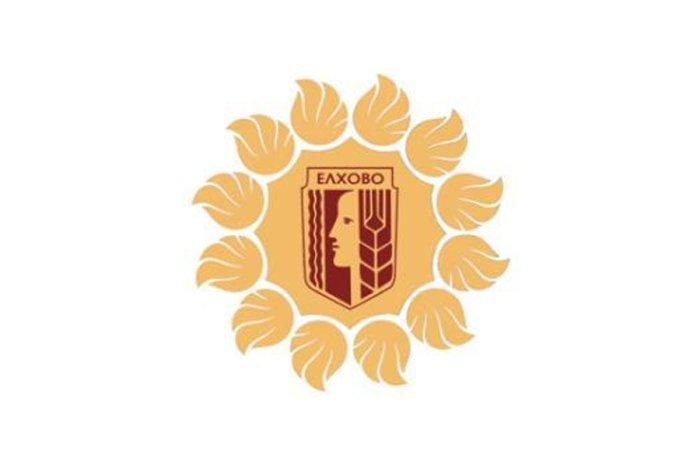
- Flag Coat of arms

- Location of Elhovo
- Coordinates: 42°10′N 26°34′E
- Country: Bulgaria
- Province (Oblast): Yambol

Government
  - Mayor: Petar Kirov (GERB)
- Elevation: 106 m (348 ft)

Population (15.03.2023)
  - Total: 9,422
- Time zone: UTC+2 (EET)
  - Summer (DST): UTC+3 (EEST)
- Postal Code: 8700
- Area code: 0478
- License plate: Y

Elhovo (Bulgarian: Елхово [ˈɛɫxovo]) is a Bulgarian town in Yambol Province, located on the left bank of the Tundzha river, between Strandzha and Sakar mountains. Second largest city in the region after Yambol, the city is located at 36 km from border checkpoint Lesovo – Hamzabeyli on the Bulgarian – Turkish border. Elhovo is the administrative center of Elhovo municipality, which includes 21 villages (municipalities). The city's population as of 15 March 2023, was 9422 inhabitants.

The town's name derives from the Bulgarian word for "alder" and the placename suffix -ovo. During the Ottoman rule it was known as Kızılağaç, also meaning "alder".

== Geography ==
Elhovo is located on the left bank of the Tundzha River in the southeastern part of the Thracian Valley (Thrace) between Strandzha mountain and Sakar Mountain in the fertile field. 38 km from the town of Yambol, 100 km from the town of Burgas and 339 km southeast of Sofia. Settlement system Elhovo is located in the southeastern part of Yambol region. Covering part of the lowland and low mountain Tundzha region - an area of the middle valley of the river Tundzha, and part of the Dervent Heights.

Central to this region is the field of Elhovo. Its flat surface extends on both sides of the river Tundzha which is flowing from the north. The average elevation is 100–150 m. In the peripheral parts the field gradually passes into the gentle slopes of the Manastira and the Dervent Heights.

The flat terrain in northern gradually passes from low mountain - this includes part of the Dervent heights, which in the geographical appearance have much in common with the Strandzha (mountain). Probable boundary between them is flat saddle, from which starts the river Popovska. In their hills passes state border with Turkey. The settlement system included in the Dervent heights has an average elevation up to 450 meters. From their northern slopes the right inflows of the river Tundzha - river Popovska and river Arapliyska, collect their water.

Elevation amplitude of topography of the area is very small, and soil erosion is slightly pronounced. In south, river Tundzha crosses the low mountain range, dividing Dervent heights from Sakar mountain. Among them, the river forms a long gorge. Steep valleys and numerous curves make it a picturesque and attractive place.

== Notable people ==
- Aoiyama Kōsuke (born Daniel Ivanov) - sumo wrestler
- Encho Keryazov - acrobat
- Velko Kanev (1948-2011) - actor

== Honour ==
Elhovo Gap on Livingston Island in the South Shetland Islands, Antarctica is named after Elhovo.
