= Lyuben Dilov Jr. =

Bulgarian Writer (1964–2026)

- Любен Дилов-син
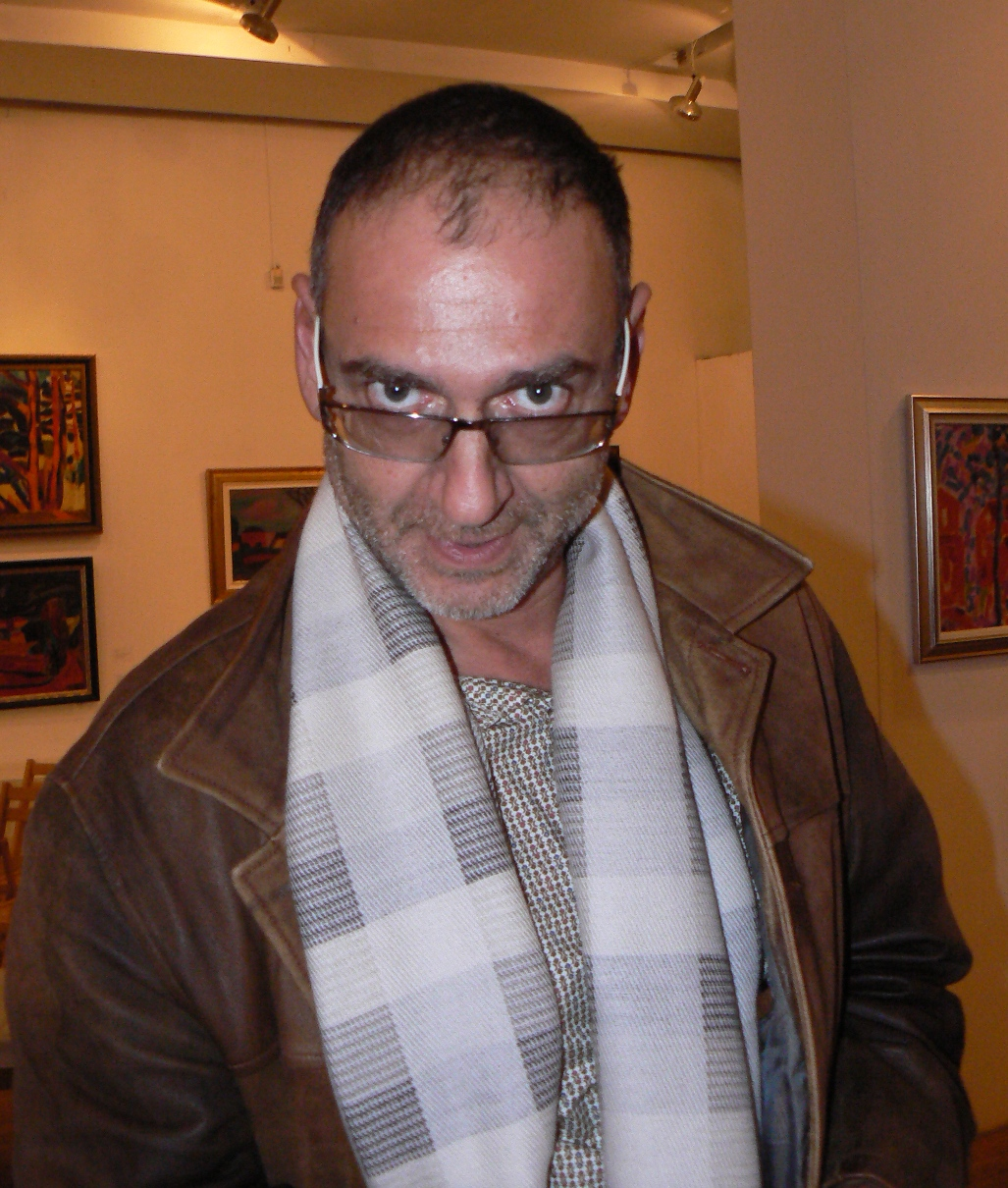
- Dilov Jr in 2010
- Born: 19 November 1964; Sofia, Bulgaria
- Died: 2 June 2026 (aged 61); Sofia, Bulgaria
- Occupations: Writer, journalist, film director, politician

Lyuben Lyubenov Dilov Jr. (Bulgarian: Любен Любенов Дилов-син; 19 November 1964 – 2 June 2026), also known as Luben Dilov Jr. and Ljuben Dilov Jr., was a Bulgarian writer, journalist, film director and politician.

== Life and career ==
Dilov studied journalism at Sofia University and subsequently worked as an editor for a number of publications. In the 1990s, Dilov Jr. was the ideological force behind some famous talk shows such as Slavi's Show, "Canaletto", "Hashove" and "КU-KU". He has also been active in politics, being the founder of the George's Day Movement (Bulgarian: Движение Гергьовден, Dvizhenie Gergyovden), which was for a long time aligned with the IMRO. Dilov's "Gergyovden" participated in the 2014 Bulgarian elections in a coalition with the Bulgaria Without Censorship (Bulgarian: България без цензура) political party.

His father, Lyuben Dilov, was a famous Bulgarian writer. Dilov Jr. had three children with his wife, Elina, from whom he separated.

He suffered a heart attack in the spring of 2026 and had been receiving medical treatment, including hospitalisation abroad. He died on 2 June, at the age of 61.
