= Agop Melkonyan =

Bulgarian science fiction author (1949 – 2006)

Agop Melkonyan (March 10, 1949, in Burgas – July 23, 2006, in Sofia) was a Bulgarian writer of Armenian descent. He is best known as an author of science fiction short stories and novels. He was also a translator, journalist, editor and scholar.

Melkonyan popularized contemporary discoveries in physics, astronomy and mechanics in Bulgaria. His literary influence spread mainly through such Bulgarian periodical editions as Orbita, Omega and Varkolak.

Melkonyan was awarded the most important Bulgarian prize for science fiction Gravition in 1991. There is a literary prize on his name and a widely popular memorial anthology was published in 2017 under the title A Machine for Stories. Melkonyan's story A Boy with Wings (‘Momche s krila’) is included in the primary schools’ program.

His translations, mostly from Russian and Armenian, include both poetry and prose (works by his friends Arkady and Boris Strugatsky among others).

His works, translated into many European languages, include: the prose collections A Memory of the World ('Spomen za sveta', 1980), Via Dolorosa, 1987, Death in the Sea-Shell ('Smart v rakovinata', 1994), A Turmoil for Souls ('Sumatoha za dushite', 2004) and others.

== Bibliography ==
Агоп Мелконян (1949-2006), В: "Тера фантастика" / 2011, p. 8-23.

Милоев, Велко (състав.) и др., Спомен за света на Агоп Мелконян, София, ИК Ерато-арт, 2008.
