= Elizabeth Anne Hull =

American academic (1937–2021)

- Born: January 10, 1937; Upper Darby Township, Pennsylvania, U.S.
- Died: August 3, 2021 (aged 84)
- Occupations: Professor, editor
- Spouse: Frederik Pohl

Elizabeth Anne Hull (January 10, 1937 – August 3, 2021) was an American academic, political activist and science fiction expert. She was a professor at William Rainey Harper College in Palatine, Illinois for over 30 years. Hull was president of the Science Fiction Research Association, and editor of its newsletter.

== Early life and education ==
Hull was born in Upper Darby Township, Pennsylvania, and educated at Illinois State University (1954–55); City Colleges of Chicago (A.A., 1965); Northwestern University and Loyola University (M.A., 1970, Ph.D., 1975).

== Career ==
Hull was a member of the faculty at William Rainey Harper College in Palatine, Illinois, where she was a professor of English for over 30 years. She served as president of the Science Fiction Research Association and editor of its newsletter. SFRA awarded her the Thomas D. Clareson Award for Distinguished Service in 1997, and she was a member of the panel for the John W. Campbell Memorial Award for best SF novel since 1986. For over ten years, she served as North American secretary for the World SF International Organization for Professionals.

With her husband Frederik Pohl, Hull edited the international anthology Tales from the Planet Earth. She was editor of the 2010 anthology, Gateways: Original New Stories Inspired by Frederik Pohl. In 1993, Hull was regional judge for the National Council of Teachers of English Achievement Awards in Writing.

== Politics ==
In 1996, Hull, a former president of the Palatine Area League of Women Voters, was selected by the Democratic Party as its nominee against longtime Republican Congressman Phil Crane in Illinois's 8th congressional district; however, Crane was reelected.

== Personal life ==
Hull and Pohl married in 1984. He had been married and divorced four times. "From her previous marriage, she had two daughters, Catherine Pizarro and Barbara Wintczak, and two grandchildren, Christine and Eric Wintczak."
