= Nikolaos Tsitiridis =

Bulgarian comedian

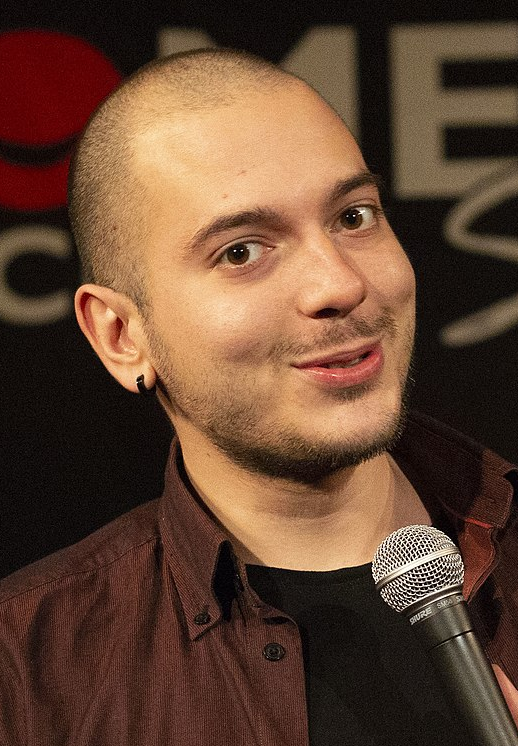
- Nikolaos Tsitiridis on the stage of Comedy Club Sofia, 2018
- Born: February 1, 1994 (age 32); Athens, Greece
- Occupations: comedian, television presenter
- Website: https://nikolaostsitiridis.com/

Nikolaos Tsitiridis is a Greek-born Bulgarian comedian, writer, screenwriter and television presenter.

He is known for his stand-up performances at The Comedy Club Sofia, as well as the host of The Nikolaos Tsitiridis Show on bTV.

== Biography ==
Nikolaos-Theodoros Ilias Tsitiridis was born on February 1, 1994, in Athens, Greece. His father is Greek and his mother is Bulgarian from Blagoevgrad. At the age of 5, he came to Bulgaria with his mother. In 2009 he started playing drums and founded his first band.

He completed his primary education in 6th elementary school (in Sofia) and secondary education in 32nd secondary school (Sofia).

He studied journalism at the Faculty of Journalism and Mass Communication at Sofia University "St. Kliment Ohridski". He works on his specialty at Offnews. For his work in the media, he won the "Valya Krushkina – journalism for the people" award.

== Career ==
Since 2016, he has been part of The Comedy Club Sofia. He began his career as a comedian on the Open Mic show at The Comedy Club Sofia. After less than a year, he signed a contract with club manager Ivan Kirkov and became a professional stand-up comedian. Since May 16, 2019, he has been a resident – the highest title for special achievements in comedy in Bulgaria. He also participates in The Comedy Club News podcast (show on YouTube), where every week he discusses the week together with Ivan Kirkov and Alexander Deyanski.

From January 27, 2020, he was the host of The Nikolaos Tsitiridis Show on bTV.

In 2022, he was a jury member of the eighth season of Balgariya tarsi talant.

In the same year, he voiced in the Bulgarian dubbing of the animated film Minions: The Rise of Gru, recorded in the studio "Alexandra Audio" with the role of Jean-Crab, originally voiced by Jean-Claude Van Damme. This is his only dub appearance.

In 2023 Nikolaos Tsitiridis's show got taken off air for unknown reasons. Following that he's returned to comedy. Later that same year he partook in a competition with his now rival Kristian "Bezdomnika" Uzunov. in which they competed for having a higher rank in the popular game and e-sport League of Legends. Which he lost on the final day.

In 2025, he appeared as contestant in „Kato dve kapki voda“ on NOVA - the concurrent channel of bTV.
