= Ivo Siromahov =

Bulgarian writer

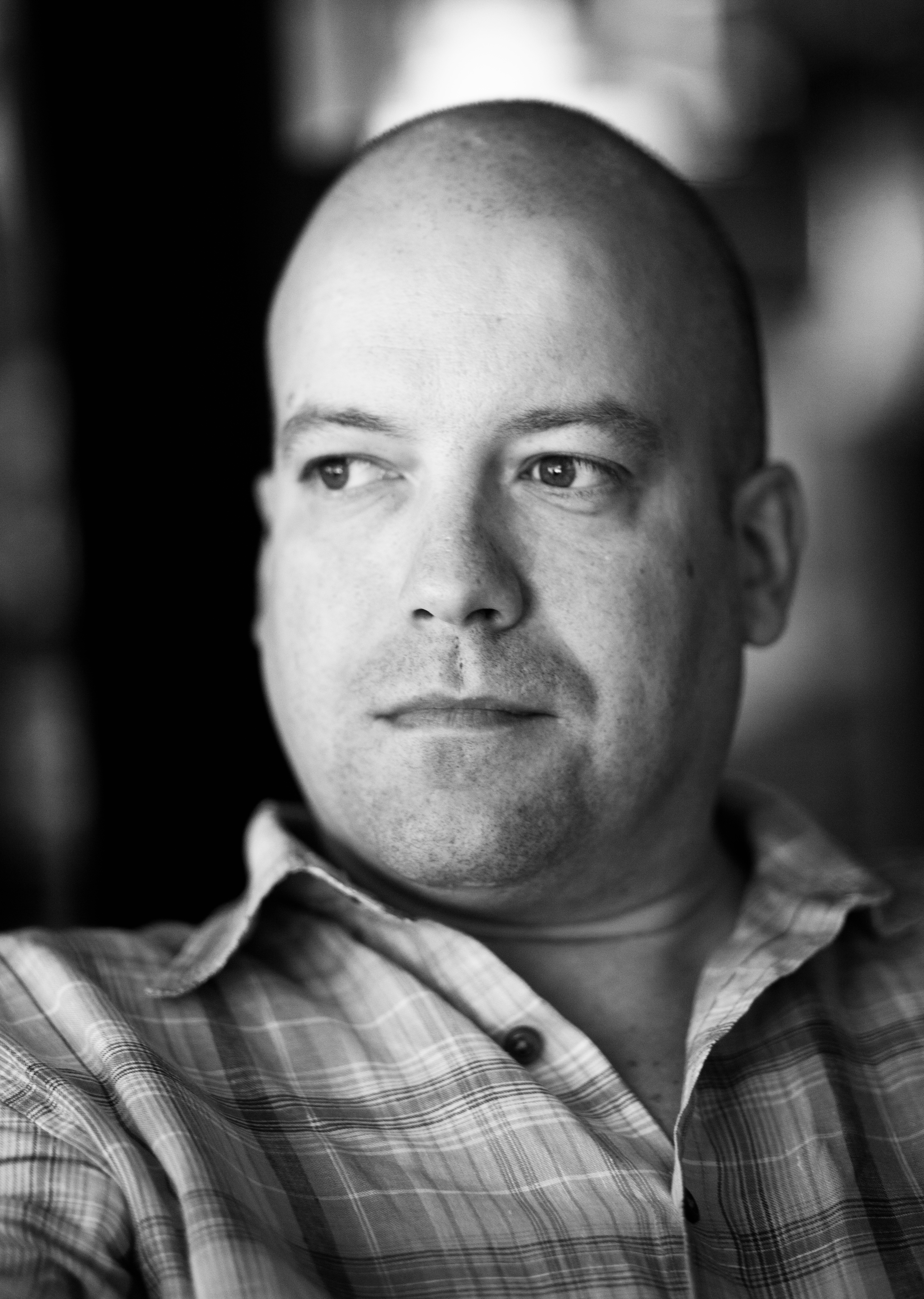
- Born: Ivo Bozhanov Siromahov; 29 December 1971 (age 54); Sofia, Bulgaria
- Occupations: writer, playwright, humorist, journalist
- Website: ivosiromahov.com

Ivo Bozhanov Siromahov (born 29 December 1971) is a Bulgarian writer, screenwriter, director and actor. He has worked as a director in Sofia's Little City Theater "Off the Channel" and Theater Bulgarian Army. Since 2000 he has been a senior scriptwriter in the late night show "Slavi show" where he also acts and hosts.

He has written a wide range of articles for the daily newspaper "24 chasa" and magazines "MAXIM" and "Playboy".

In 2014 he received "The Flower of Helikon" prize for his novel "My secret love life". This award is presented to the best selling Bulgarian book.

== Bibliography ==
Novels and short stories collections:

- A night at the cemetery (1999)
- An optimistic theory of Bulgarian sex (2007)
- Diaries and nightgowns (2008)
- There is no point (2009)
- It doesn't matter (2011)
- Glasses (2012)
- Bulgarian pulp (2012)
- Ladies and Gentlemen (2013)
- Bulgarian stuff (2014)
- My secret love life (2014)
- 7 women (2015)
- Love stories (2016)
- Shakespeare 3D (2016)
- Little fairy tales (2016)
- Bulgarian radio (2017)
- A love novel (2018)
- Fairy tales of the mountain (2018)

== Plays ==
- Bulgarian pulp (2009)
- Pimps (2009)
- The Surgery (2010)
- Gossip (2011)
- Love stories (2012)
- Government (2014)
- Bulgarian stories (2015)
- The Island (2017)
