= 1897 in literature =

This article contains information about the literary events and publications of 1897.

== Events ==
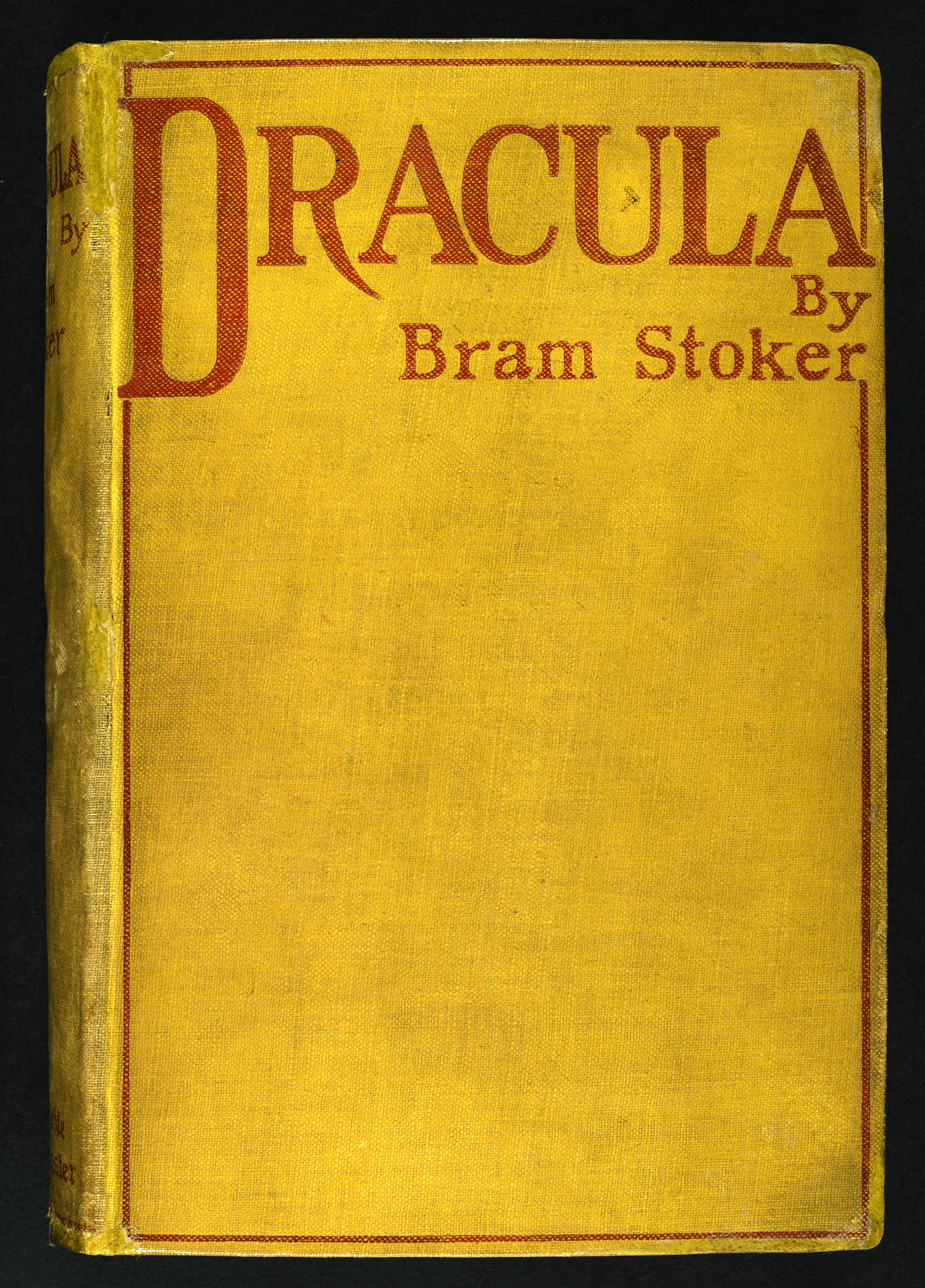
1st ed.

- January–March – Oscar Wilde, imprisoned in Reading Gaol in England, writes a letter to his lover, Lord Alfred Douglas, De Profundis.
- January 2 – Newspapers in London erroneously report the death of Mark Twain. It is believed the rumors began when Twain's cousin had become ill. Twain makes his famous statement, "The report of my death was an exaggeration."
- April–December – H. G. Wells' science fiction novel The War of the Worlds is serialized in Pearson's Magazine (London).
- April 13 – The Grand Guignol is opened in Paris by Oscar Méténier.
- May 19 – Oscar Wilde is released early this morning from Pentonville Prison in London, to which he has been transferred from Reading via Twyford the previous night. This afternoon he visits Hatchards bookshop briefly before catching an evening train to Newhaven, on his way to exile on the continent under the pseudonym "Sebastian Melmoth".
- May 26
  - The theatrical manager Bram Stoker's contemporary Gothic horror novel Dracula is published in London by Constable with a late change of title from The Un-Dead. It will influence vampire literature for the following century. On May 18 he had staged a reading of a dramatised version for copyright purposes before an audience of two at the Lyceum Theatre, London.
  - The original manuscript of William Bradford's history, Of Plymouth Plantation, is returned to the Governor of Massachusetts by the Bishop of London after being taken during the American Revolutionary War.
- June 22 – Moscow Art Theatre is formed by Constantin Stanislavski and Vladimir Nemirovich-Danchenko.
- July 2 – The Yorkshire Dialect Society is founded, the oldest such society in England.
- July 25 – The writer Jack London sails to join the Klondike Gold Rush, where he will write his first successful stories.
- October – The first issue of Albina, a Romanian literary and agriculturalist magazine aimed at a peasant readership, is published in Bucharest by Ioan Kalinderu, George Coșbuc and Petre Dulfu.
- November 1 – The Library of Congress Building in Washington, D.C., is opened.
- November 14 – Nancy Vincent McClelland's story "A Mystery of the Paris Exposition" is published in The Philadelphia Inquirer, the earliest known publication of the 'Vanishing Hotel Room' urban legend.
- December 28 – Edmond Rostand's play Cyrano de Bergerac opens at the Théâtre de la Porte Saint-Martin in Paris with the theater's director, Coquelin aîné, in the title role. The applause lasts for more than an hour.
- December 30 – The comedy The White Horse Inn (Im weißen Rößl), by Oscar Blumenthal and Gustav Kadelburg, opens in Berlin. Decades later it will be turned into a successful musical play.
- unknown dates
  - Hall Caine's novel The Christian: a story is published and becomes the first in Britain to sell a million copies. The author also writes a dramatization.
  - Anna Katharine Green's That Affair Next Door introduces the first female fictional detective character in a novel, Amelia Butterworth, an inquisitive New York society spinster.
  - Benito Pérez Galdós is elected to the Real Academia Española.
  - The publisher Doubleday is founded as the Doubleday & McClure Company by Frank Nelson Doubleday in partnership with magazine publisher Samuel McClure in New York City.
  - The publisher Commercial Press (simplified Chinese: 商务印书馆; traditional Chinese: 商務印書館; pinyin: Shāngwù Yìnshūguǎn) is founded as the first modern publishing organisation in China, by 26-year-old Xia Ruifang and three friends in Shanghai.
  - Winter 1896–97 – A significant collection of unpublished 17th-century manuscripts later recognised as by Thomas Traherne is discovered by chance in London.

== New books ==
=== Fiction ===
- John Kendrick Bangs – The Pursuit of the House-Boat
- Léon Bloy – The Woman Who Was Poor (La Femme pauvre)
- Hall Caine – The Christian
- Kate Chopin
  - A Night in Acadie (short stories)
  - "A Pair of Silk Stockings" (published in Vogue, September)
- Joseph Conrad – The Nigger of the 'Narcissus'
- Miguel de Unamuno – Paz en la guerra (Peace in War)
- Mary E. Wilkins Freeman – Jerome
- John Galsworthy (as John Sinjohn) – From the Four Winds (short stories)
- George Gissing – The Whirlpool
- Ellen Glasgow – The Descendant
- Sarah Grand – The Beth Book
- Thomas Hardy – The Well-Beloved (book publication)
- Victor Ido – Don Juan
- Henry James
  - The Spoils of Poynton
  - What Maisie Knew
- Fred T. Jane – To Venus in Five Seconds
- Hans E. Kinck – Den nye kapellanen
- Camille Lemonnier – L'Homme en amour
- Pierre Loti – Ramuntcho
- Richard Marsh – The Beetle
- W. Somerset Maugham – Liza of Lambeth
- Silas Weir Mitchell – Hugh Wynne, Free Quaker
- Arthur Morrison – The Dorrington Deed Box
- Bolesław Prus – Pharaoh (Faraon; book publication)
- Władysław Reymont – The Promised Land (Ziemia Obiecana; serialization begins)
- Amanda McKittrick Ros – Irene Iddesleigh
- Robert Louis Stevenson (completed posthumously by Arthur Quiller-Couch) – St. Ives
- Bram Stoker – Dracula
- August Strindberg – Inferno
- Jules Verne – An Antarctic Mystery (Le Sphinx des glaces)
- Ethel Lilian Voynich – The Gadfly
- Lew Wallace – The Wooing of Malkatoon
- H. G. Wells – The Invisible Man
- Kurd Lasswitz — Two Planets
- Anonymous – Flossie, a Venus of Fifteen

=== Children and young people ===
- L. Frank Baum – Mother Goose in Prose
- Elsa Beskow – Sagan om den lilla, lilla gumman (Tale of the Little Little Old Woman)
- Ellen Thorneycroft Fowler – The Professor's Children
- Rudyard Kipling
  - Captains Courageous
  - The Third Jungle Book
- E. Nesbit – The Children's Shakespeare
- Władysław Umiński – Od Warszawy do Ojcowa

=== Drama ===
- Gabriele D'Annunzio – Il Sogno di un mattino di primavera
- Octave Mirbeau – Les Mauvais bergers (The Bad Shepherds)
- Quintero brothers – El ojito right
- Edmond Rostand – Cyrano de Bergerac
- Arthur Schnitzler – La Ronde (Reigen; first performed 1921)

=== Poetry ===
- Þorsteinn Erlingsson – Þyrnar (Thorns)
- See also 1897 in poetry

=== Non-fiction ===
- Adolphe Appia – Musique et mise en scéne (Music and Staging)
- Annie Besant – The Ancient Wisdom
- Alice Diehl – Musical Memories
- Émile Durkheim – Le Suicide
- Gustav Jaeger (translated by H. G. Schlichter) – Problems of Nature: Researches and Discoveries
- Stéphane Mallarmé – Divagations
- Nouveau Larousse illustré
- Ralph Waldo Trine – In Tune With The Infinite: Fullness of Peace, Power and Plenty
- Edith Wharton and Ogden Codman – The Decoration of Houses

== Births ==
- January 8 – Dennis Wheatley, English thriller writer (died 1977)
- January 11 – Bernard DeVoto, American historian (died 1955)
- January 14 – Wasif Jawhariyyeh, Palestinian Arab diarist, poet and composer (died 1972)
- January 19 – Natacha Rambova (Winifred Shaughnessy), American dramatist (died 1966)
- January 27 – Iris Tree, English poet (died 1968)
- February 1 – Denise Robins, English romantic novelist (died 1985)
- March 8 – Josep Pla, Catalan journalist and writer (died 1981)
- March 17 – Barbu Solacolu, Romanian poet, translator and economist (died 1976)
- March 23 – Béla Hamvas, Hungarian philosopher (died 1968)
- May 11 – Carola Oman, English historical novelist, biographer and children's writer (died 1978)
- June 20 – Elisabeth Hauptmann, German writer (died 1973)
- July 1 – Edward Tennant, English poet (killed in action 1916)
- July 14 – Myroslav Irchan, Ukrainian storywriter and playwright (shot with many other Ukrainian intellectuals at Sandarmokh 1937)
- July 15 – R. J. Yeatman, English humorous author (died 1968)
- July 25 – Basil Willey, English academic literary critic (died 1978)
- August 11
  - Enid Blyton – English children's author (died 1968)
  - Louise Bogan – American poet (died 1970)
- September 10 – Georges Bataille, French philosopher, essayist and novelist (died 1962)
- September 25 – William Faulkner, American novelist (died 1962)
- September 26 – Michael Joseph, English publisher (died 1958)
- October 3 – James Hanley, English novelist and dramatist of Irish descent (died 1985)
- October 4 – Jirō Osaragi (大佛 次郎, Haruhiku Nojiri), Japanese novelist (died 1973)
- October 17 – Ștefana Velisar Teodoreanu, Romanian novelist, memoirist and poet (died 1995)
- October 21 – Alexander Lernet-Holenia, Austrian poet, dramatist and fiction writer (died 1976)
- October 22 – Marjorie Flack, American children's author (died 1958)
- November 1 – Naomi Mitchison, Scottish novelist and poet (died 1999)
- November 5 – Hilda Vīka, Latvian poet and novelist (died 1963)
- November 7 – Herman J. Mankiewicz, American screenwriter (died 1953)
- November 8 – Dorothy Day, American journalist (died 1980)
- November 15 – Sacheverell Sitwell, English writer and art critic (died 1988)
- November 28 – Marcus Goodrich, American screenwriter and novelist (died 1991)
- December 3 – Kate O'Brien, Irish novelist and dramatist (died 1974)
- October 23 – Arab Shamilov, Kurdish novelist (died 1978)
- December 8 – Josephine Bell, English novelist (died 1987)
- December 25 – Wilson Starbuck, American playwright and author (died 1983)
- December 26 – Willy Corsari (Wilhelmina Schmidt), Dutch author of detective fiction (died 1998)

== Deaths ==
- January 24 – Margaret Wolfe Hungerford, Irish novelist (born 1855)
- February 4 – Walter Gregor, Scottish folklorist, linguist and pastor (born 1825)
- March 2 – Guillermo Prieto, Mexican novelist, short-story writer and poet (born 1818)
- March 6 – E. Cobham Brewer, English lexicographer (born 1810)
- March 7 – Harriet Jacobs, African-American writer (born 1813)
- March 11 – Henry Drummond, Scottish evangelist and natural historian (born 1851)
- April 26 – Manonmaniam Sundaram Pillai, Indian scholar and dramatist (born 1855)
- May 4 – Isabella Banks, English poet and novelist (born 1821)
- May 12
  - Minna Canth, Finnish writer and social activist (b. 1844)
  - Mary Alice Fonda, American music critic (b. 1837)
- June 25 – Margaret Oliphant, Scottish novelist (born 1828)
- July 6 – Henri Meilhac, French dramatist and opera librettist (born 1831)
- July 20 – Jean Ingelow, English novelist and poet (born 1820)
- July 28 – Étienne Vacherot, French philosophical writer (born 1809)
- August 2 – Adam Asnyk, Polish poet and dramatist (born 1838)
- August 5 – James Hammond Trumbull, American philologist (born 1821)
- August 8 – Jacob Burckhardt, Swiss historian (born 1818)
- August 25 – Léon Gautier, French historian (born 1832)
- September 9
  - Richard Holt Hutton, English critic and journalist (born 1826)
  - Ferenc Pulszky, Hungarian political writer (born 1814)
- October 23 – Jessie Catherine Couvreur, Australian novelist (born 1848)
- October 24 – Francis Turner Palgrave, English anthologist (born 1824)
- October 27 – Gheorghe Chițu, Romanian classical scholar, publisher and journalist (born 1828)
- November 15 – Lucinda Barbour Helm, American author, editor, and activist (born 1839)
- November 29 – James Legge, Scottish sinologist, missionary and translator (born 1815)
- December 17 – Alphonse Daudet, French novelist (born 1840)

== Awards ==
- Stanhope Essay Prize – John Buchan
