= So Long at the Fair =

1950 British thriller film

- Theatrical release poster
- Directed by: Terence Fisher; Antony Darnborough
- Screenplay by: Hugh Mills; Anthony Thorne
- Based on: So Long at the Fair; 1947 novel by Anthony Thorne
- Produced by: Betty E. Box; Sydney Box
- Starring: Jean Simmons; Dirk Bogarde; David Tomlinson
- Cinematography: Reginald H. Wyer
- Edited by: Gordon Hales
- Music by: Benjamin Frankel
- Production company: Gainsborough Pictures
- Distributed by: General Film Distributors
- Release date: 31 May 1950 (UK)
- Running time: 86 minutes
- Country: United Kingdom
- Language: English
- Box office: £132,000 (by 1953)

So Long at the Fair (US re-release title The Black Curse) is a 1950 British thriller film directed by Terence Fisher and Antony Darnborough, and starring Jean Simmons and Dirk Bogarde. It was adapted from the 1947 novel of the same name by Anthony Thorne.

== Plot ==
In 1889, young Englishwoman Victoria (Vicky) Barton and her older brother Johnny arrive in Paris to visit the Exposition Universelle. This is Vicky's first time in Paris, and after checking into the Hôtel de la Licorne (or Unicorn Hotel), she drags her tired brother to dinner and to the famous Moulin Rouge. She finally retires for the night, while Johnny has a late-night drink. When English painter George Hathaway drops off his friend Rhoda O'Donovan and her mother at the Hôtel de la Licorne, he sees Johnny in the lobby and asks him for change for a 100-franc note to pay a carriage driver. Johnny lends George 50 francs and gives his name and room number when George insists on being able to pay him back.

The next morning, Vicky discovers that Johnny is missing and there is a blank wall where his room (adjacent to hers (#17)) used to be. His room number (#19) now adorns the common bathroom on the floor. When Vicky questions hotel owner and manager Madame Hervé, the latter claims that Vicky must be mistaken; she arrived alone the previous night. Madame Hervé's brother Narcisse and the day porter back up her story.

Frantic, Vicky goes to the British consul, followed secretly by Narcisse. She has no proof of her brother's existence, so the consul can only suggest she locate a witness, Nina, the hotel maid who attended her. Nina had informed her that she was going up in a balloon with her boyfriend at the Exposition that day. Vicky is too late; before she can talk to Nina, the balloon ascends, bursts into flames, and plummets to the ground, killing the two passengers.

Next, Vicky tries the French police commissaire. He questions Madame Hervé and her brother, but the policeman can detect nothing amiss in their story. Since Vicky's room was reserved for only two nights, she must leave the hotel. Madame Hervé provides her with a ticket home to England, which Vicky is forced to accept, as she has little money left. However, unbeknownst to either party, Rhoda O'Donovan was asked by George Hathaway to deliver a letter containing his loan repayment to Johnny. Not finding Johnny's disappeared room, Rhoda slips the envelope under Vicky's door. Vicky reads the letter and learns George's address.

Vicky goes to see George. When he confirms having met her brother, she bursts into tears, partly in relief since Madame Hervé had been placing Vicky's sanity in doubt. George offers his help. He studies the exterior of the hotel and notices there are six balconies on Vicky's floor, but there are now only five rooms on that floor. George checks into a room (#29) at the Hôtel de la Licorne for the night and discovers that the door of the room that was Johnny's #19 had been renumbered to display #20. George finds the missing hotel room, the door from an adjoining room having been covered by a large armoire, and through probing discovers that the doorway from the hallway has been covered over by a newly constructed wall. He also discovers altered hotel records along with Johnny's missing documents and other possessions including a jeweled brooch belonging to Vicky.

Under questioning by the police commissioner, Madame Hervé reveals Johnny's whereabouts. It turns out he was taken very ill that first night. He rang the bell for assistance. The hotel front desk summoned a doctor who diagnosed bubonic plague. Fearful that news of a case of plague would be disastrous for the Exposition, Madame Hervé and the doctor whisked Johnny away in secrecy to a rundown Parisian hospital, checking him in under a false name. She then worked with her staff to conceal the fact that Johnny had ever been at her hotel.

George brings Doctor Hart to the hospital, who examines Johnny and tells Vicky her brother has a chance of living. During this time, a romance has developed between George and Vicky.

== Cast ==
- Jean Simmons as Vicky Barton
- Dirk Bogarde as George Hathaway
- David Tomlinson as Johnny Barton
- Marcel Poncin as Narcisse
- Cathleen Nesbitt as Madame Hervé
- Honor Blackman as Rhoda O'Donovan
- Betty Warren as Mrs. O'Donovan
- Zena Marshall as Nina
- Eugene Deckers as Day Porter
- Felix Aylmer as British Consul
- André Morell as Doctor Hart
- Austin Trevor as Police Commissaire
- Natasha Sokolova as Charlotte
- Nelly Arno as Madame Verni

== Origin ==
The general plot derives from what appears to be a 19th-century urban legend, known variously as "The Vanishing Hotel Room" or "The Vanishing Lady", which has inspired several fictional works.

The first published version of the story was written by Nancy Vincent McClelland as "A Mystery of the Paris Exposition" in The Philadelphia Inquirer dated 14 November 1897. It next appeared in the Detroit Free Press in 1898 as "Porch Tales: The Disappearance of Mrs. Kneeb", by Kenneth Herford.

The German author Anselma Heine's novel Die Erscheinung (1912) covers the same idea, and it was filmed as a segment called 'The Apparition" in Unheimliche Geschichten (Uncanny stories) (1919, remake 1932). Belloc Lowndes' 1913 novel The End of Her Honeymoon also contains the tale, as does Lawrence Rising's 1920 She Who Was Helena Cass, Sir Basil Thomson's 1925 The Vanishing of Mrs. Fraser, and Ernest Hemingway's 1926 The Torrents of Spring. The German film Covered Tracks (1938) was based on the story, with a script by Thea von Harbou, and portions of the idea also featured in Alfred Hitchcock's 1938 film The Lady Vanishes.

The radio play "Cabin B-13" by John Dickson Carr tells a similar story. It aired three times in the series Suspense (twice in 1943 and once in 1949), and gave rise to its own short-lived mystery radio series, Cabin B-13, after which it was adapted for television as "Cabin B-13" in the series Climax! (1958). It was then filmed as the theatrical release Dangerous Crossing (1953) and as the television movie Treacherous Crossing (1992).

On TV, both the episode "Into Thin Air" (1955) of the anthology-series Alfred Hitchcock Presents and the episode "The Disappearance" (1967) of the series The Big Valley were based on the same tale.

There was a later variation, entitled "Maybe You Will Remember", told in Alvin Schwartz's book Scary Stories 3 (1991).

The title of the novel and film derives from the line, "Johnny's so long at the fair", which can be found in most versions of the nursery rhyme, "Oh Dear! What Can the Matter Be?".

== Music ==
The music, by Benjamin Frankel, includes a sequence accompanying a ride in a carriage which went on to become a popular light concert song, "Carriage and Pair". In 2006 the film's music was released on a CD album along with music from the films The Curse of the Werewolf, The Net and The Prisoner.

== Production ==
Betty Box was appointed producer at the last minute when Antony Darnborough was held up on The Astonished Heart.

So Long at the Fair was to have cast Françoise Rosay, but she dropped out to work in Hollywood.

The film was shot at Pinewood Studios. The sets were designed by the art directors Cedric Dawe and George Provis. The costumes were designed by Elizabeth Haffenden.

== Reception ==
The film performed solidly at the box office.
