= Magic Ship (disambiguation) =

Magic Ship is the second studio album by American folk trio Mountain Man.

Magic Ship may also refer to:

- HMS Magic, several ships
- The Magic Ship or Czarodziejski okręt, Polish robinsonade novel

== See also ==
- Ship of Magic
