= Zaziemskie światy =

1948 science fiction novel by Władysław Umiński

- Book cover of the first edition
- Author: Władysław Umiński
- Language: Polish
- Genre: Science fiction
- Publisher: Gebethner and Wolff
- Publication date: 1956
- Publication place: Poland

Zaziemskie światy. Pierwszy lot międzyplanetarny (Extraterrestrial Worlds. The First Interplanetary Flight) is a Polish science fiction novel by Władysław Umiński, completed in 1948 but published only in 1956. Its publication was blocked by communist censors due to its perceived ideological incompatibility with socialist values. It was the last book published by Umiński and by the Gebethner and Wolff publishing house.

The novel follows a group of interplanetary explorers from Earth on a journey to Venus, where they encounter a highly advanced civilization of human-like beings who descended from Atlantis and have embraced a spiritual and ascetic way of life.

Zaziemskie światy's blend of interplanetary travel, Atlantis myths, and critiques of industrial society aligns it with earlier European speculative fiction in the tradition of Jules Verne. The novel marked a dramatic departure from Umiński’s earlier, positivist works that celebrated scientific progress. Instead, in the aftermath of World War II, it reflects a disillusionment with material civilization, favoring spiritual and psychological evolution over technological advancements. Some critics see it as one of the most dystopian works of 1950s Polish literature, while others view it as a philosophical critique of humanity’s moral decline.

== History of creation and publication ==
The book was originally titled Wyprawa na Wenus (Expedition to Venus) and was written on commission from the underground publishing house Wisła.

Kamila Budrowska notes that the author completed the novel during the occupation of Poland. The manuscript was sent for printing in 1948 but was blocked by the Soviet censors in January 1949. It was not released until 1956, becoming the last book published by the Gebethner and Wolff publishing house. It was registered in documents on 11 August 1956, with a retroactive publication date of 1948 in a print run of 7,000 copies by Gebethner and Wolff, which had officially closed in 1950.

== Plot ==
The novel describes the first interplanetary flight in history – to Venus, where Earthlings encounter an advanced civilization of humans who settled there after leaving Atlantis. The inhabitants of Venus, ruled by the "Great Magician", consider themselves more advanced than Earthlings, having abandoned a civilization or culture focused on excessive material needs, and living "in harmony with nature" (they are, among other things, advocates of vegetarianism). In return, they have developed psychic powers (telepathy, telekinesis; the latter is also used as an energy source for their machines).

The novel is set in the same universe as Umiński's earlier work, Na drugą planetę (To the Second Planet).

== Reception ==
The book was not a commercial success, and was described years later as not popular. Soon after its publication, in 1959, Krystyna Kuliczkowska criticized the book, stating that it "reflects the decline of the valuable insights that were most precious in Umiński's earlier work. The meaning of the pseudo-philosophical musings spread throughout the work boils down to a primitive condemnation of material civilization and the glorification of passive contemplation, which is supposed to represent the ideal of human aspirations at the highest level of spiritual development". Antoni Smuszkiewicz notes that the novel "does not fundamentally differ from the best works of the author from the late 19th century", and even represents a certain regression compared to them.

Kamila Budrowska cites the opinions of censoring reviewers, who attributed to the novel "an inappropriate ideological basis" and "completely obscure social ideas" with "modest popular-scientific values". They criticized that the proposed social system might cause "confusion in the mind of a young reader and suggest that the solution to humanity's problems may not come through the fight for social justice, but through some mystical improvement of souls", and "an undesirable direction of youthful fantasies towards senseless dreams completely contrary to the direction in which we want to educate the youth". Additionally, censors criticized the author's fascination with the United States: "The book, written in an atmosphere of admiration for America, millionaires, and margraves, seems harmful and should not be published" and "the implication to the reader of the extraordinarily favorable conditions for the development of science and technology in a capitalist system, which has a particular significance in the current period of the march towards socialism".

== Analysis ==
Andrzej Niewiadowski and Smuszkiewicz assess that the experiences of World War II were "a severe blow to the positivist worldview" of the aged writer and led him to an "ideological turn" and "revolutionary change", abandoning the vision of progress brought about by scientific and technical civilization in favor of an apologia for the spiritual transformation of man. According to Smuszkiewicz, Umiński — who, at the time of writing, was over 80 years old — "cannot view new discoveries and inventions through the eyes of his former positivist enthusiasm for knowledge and progress. He reluctantly views the development of material civilization and instead focuses on the internal, spiritual development of man". Although the author incorporates the latest technological advances, such as radar and atomic energy, the structure of the plot and the use of fantastic elements "more likely align the work with the era of Verne".

Niewiadowski and Smuszkiewicz assess that the experiences of World War II were "a severe blow to the positivist worldview" of the aged writer and led him to an "ideological turn" and "revolutionary change", abandoning the vision of progress brought about by scientific and technical civilization in favor of an apologia for the spiritual transformation of man. According to Maria Jasińska-Wojtkowska, another significant message of the novel is the vision that "life permeates the Universe".

The book was also described as "deeply critical of earthly conditions", a "testimony to the failure of life ideals [and] the collapse of faith in the moral perfection of man", "one of the sharpest dystopias of the 1950s", "the primacy of spirituality over materialism", and viewed as a condemnation of material civilization and a promotion of passive contemplation and asceticism.

Niewiadowski writes that the author refrained from publishing the novel in the 1940s due to the necessity of re-editing it in accordance with the demands of socialist realism. The critic also posits that the author was strongly inspired by Antoni Lange's work, Miranda.

Smuszkiewicz assesses that the novel "closes the early stage of development" of Polish science fiction.

== Bibliography ==
- Smuszkiewicz, Antoni (1982). Zaczarowana gra: Zarys dziejów polskiej fantastyki naukowej [The Enchanted Game: An Outline of the History of Polish Science Fiction] (in Polish). Poznań: Wydawn. poznańskie. ISBN 978-83-210-0303-0.
- Niewiadowski, Andrzej; Smuszkiewicz, Antoni (1990). Leksykon polskiej literatury fantastycznonaukowej [Lexicon of Polish Science Fiction Literature] (in Polish). Poznań: Wydawnictwo Poznańskie. ISBN 83-210-0892-5.
