= Therapy (Fitzek novel) =

Psychological thriller

- Author: Sebastian Fitzek
- Language: German
- Genre: Psychological thriller
- Published: 2006 (German version)
- Publisher: Knaur Taschenbuchverlag
- Publication place: Germany
- ISBN: 9783426507520

Therapy is a psychological thriller and the debut novel by novelist Sebastian Fitzek published in 2006. The novel has already sold eight million copies worldwide. In addition, the novel held the number one spot on the German magazine Spiegel's bestseller list for several weeks. In 2023 it was adapted into a TV series titled Sebastian Fitzek's Therapy.

== Plot ==
Josy, the twelve-year-old daughter of the renowned psychiatrist Viktor Larenz, seems to have disappeared without trace after one of her numerous visits to the doctor. At this point, she has been suffering from an illness for months, the cause of which no doctor has been able to determine. Larenz notices Josy's disappearance and in his rage suffers a nervous breakdown. The investigations remain unsuccessful, Larenz and his wife Isabell live for years without any sign of life from their daughter.

Four years later, Larenz, who is no longer practicing, agrees to an interview in order to come to terms with the past and retreats to the island of Parkum. There he is tracked down by a beautiful stranger who pretends to be Anna Spiegel and asks him to treat her. At first reluctantly, Larenz begins therapy when Anna tells him about her illness: She is a writer and has schizophrenia; all her novel characters manifest themselves in her life. Lately, among them is also a little girl named Charlotte, who, like Josy, is terminally ill. She is also the character from an unfinished fairy tale manuscript.

Larenz scents a new trail, as Anna's tales coincide with events from the time around Josy's disappearance. He's pressuring her to finish Charlotte's story: Anna makes clear to him that Charlotte's been poisoned. During one of her schizophrenic phases, Charlotte appeared to her and begged her to run away with her from her mother Isabell. She had poisoned Charlotte to satisfy her maternal instinct and to prevent her daughter from growing up. To hide her from her mother, Anna tried to stifle the girl's cries, but killed her in the process.

Larenz wakes up with the trenchant end of the story, knowing that in truth he himself killed his own daughter. Since his collapse, he has indeed been in a psychiatric hospital as a seriously ill person without interruption, and in conversation with a doctor he experiences this bright moment, which at the same time serves as a confession of murder.

Larenz has Munchhausen syndrome by proxy and deliberately poisoned his daughter for months with medication. Pathological for this syndrome are also the numerous visits to the doctor he made with her. In his delusion he held his wife Isabell responsible for Josy's illness and drowned Josy to hide her from Isabell. Larenz is also schizophrenic and after his collapse took refuge in illusory worlds, including the island of Parkum. Anna Spiegel is a fantasy with which he treated himself.

The absence of Josy's corpse can only be explained by Larenz during an awake phase by the fact that Josy was never dead. Subsequent investigations reveal that Isabell, out of greed, framed her sick, wealthy husband for the murder of Josy, and later went into hiding with her daughter who was thought to be dead.

== Characters ==
- Dr. Viktor Larenz: The protagonist of the story, a well-known psychiatrist with a strong media presence, who is severely traumatized by the loss of his daughter and loses the line between reality and madness as the story unfolds.
- Josephine "Josy" Larenz: The daughter of Viktor Larenz. The girl disappears mysteriously and is presumed dead at the beginning of the story.
- Isabell Larenz: The greedy wife of Viktor Larenz. She frames her husband for the murder of Josy and goes into hiding.
- Anna Spiegel: Author of children's books. She is the enigmatic patient who confronts Dr. Larenz with his own traumatic past in a psychotherapy session.

== Origin of the novel ==
According to his own statements, Fitzek got the idea for the plot of his novel while staying in the waiting room of a doctor's office. His girlfriend did not appear from the consulting room, even after half an hour, and Fitzek asked himself the question what would happen if she did not appear at all and the doctor, as well as the consulting room assistants and the other patients, claimed that she had not been here at all? After one year of brainstorming, this core question became the exposé for the story. The characters of his stories have a defined psyche, origin, and past from the outset, but not yet a finished biography, which only takes shape as the story progresses. The first draft was edited seven times before it was sent to the editorial office.

It is reminiscent of the urban legend the Vanishing Hotel Room (also known as The Vanishing Lady) in which a daughter leaves her mother alone in a hotel room after her mother falls ill during an international exposition in Paris, and when the daughter returns, her mother is gone and the hotel staff claim to have no knowledge of the missing woman.

== Editions ==
Sebastian Fitzek: Therapy. Atlantic Books, London 2014, ISBN 978-0857897077.
