= Peter Schössow =

German illustrator and author (born 1953)

Peter Schössow (born 1953 in Hamburg) is a German illustrator and author of children's books. He studied at the Hochschule für Gestaltung in Hamburg. Since then he has worked as an illustrator for books, newspapers and magazines. He works mainly in mixed media, but since 2003 he has also worked with computer illustrations.

Schössow's book My First Car Was Red was translated by Sally-Ann Spencer and published by Gecko Press.
