= Jerzy Jeliński =

Polish traveler and scout

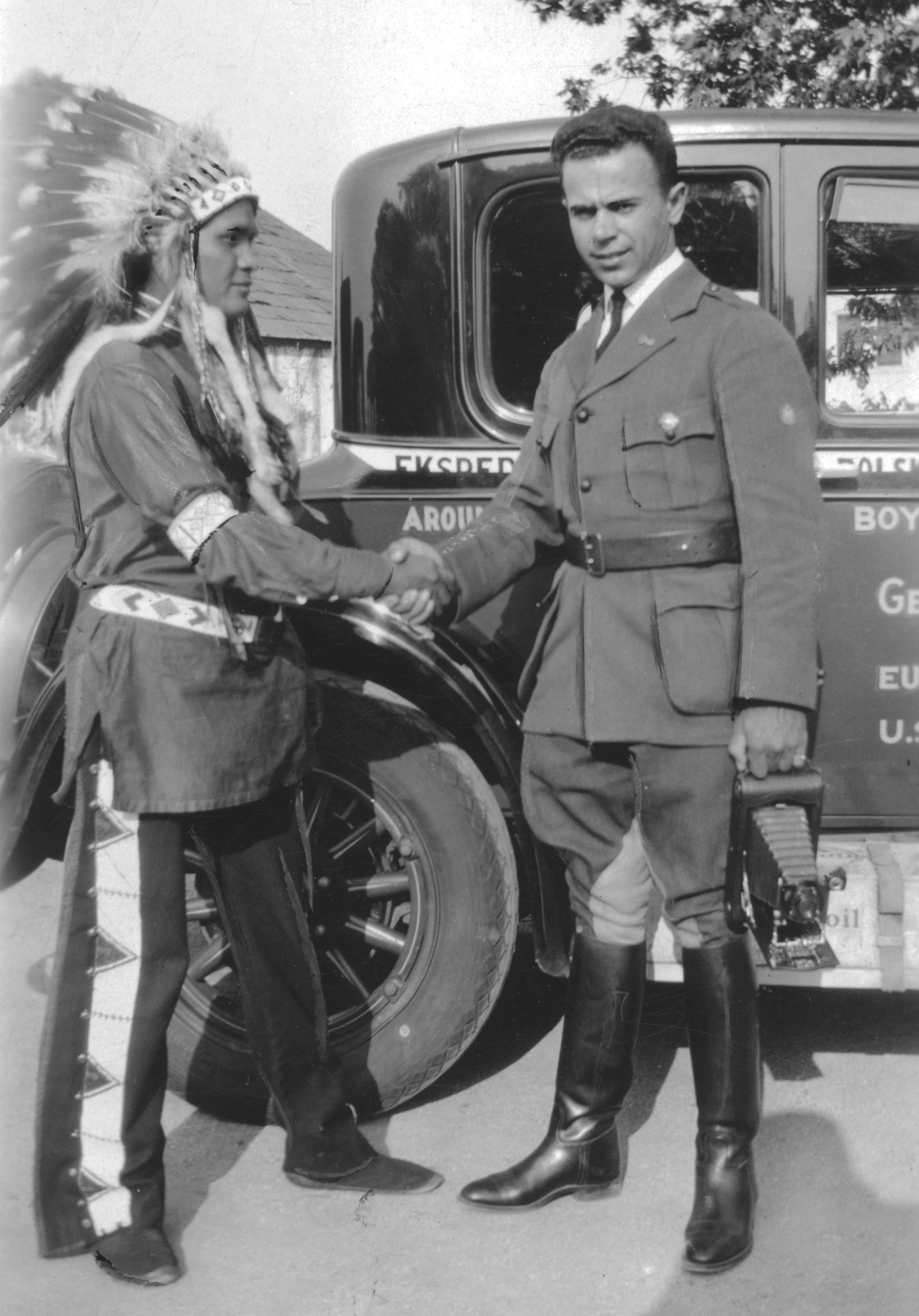
- Jerzy Jeliński in 1928 during his trip around the world. Jeliński in the USA; shaking hands with the son of a Native American chief. Visible Buick car
- Born: June 21, 1901; Warsaw, Poland
- Died: November 30, 1986 (aged 85); Warsaw
- Occupation: traveler
- Awards: Cross of Merit

Jerzy Leon Jeliński (21 June 1901 - 30 November 1986) was a Polish traveler and scout. From 1926 to 1928, he completed a successful trip around the world by car.

== Early life ==
Jeliński spent his childhood in Warsaw and the surrounding area (Stara Miłosna). In 1918, as a high school student, he joined the Polish municipal militia in Warsaw, organized after the withdrawal of German troops.

In 1920, he was one of the first volunteers to enlist in the newly established Polish Navy. He fought with the Marine Battalion during the Polish–Soviet War and was injured in the hand near Ostrołęka. After the war, he was promoted to boatswain and transferred to the Navy's headquarters in Warsaw.

== Career ==
In 1926, Jeliński, together with Eugeniusz Smosarski (brother of Jadwiga Smosarska), Brunon Bredschneider (a filmmaker), and Jan Ława (a sailor), and their dog Oranek, organized a trip around the world by car. The expedition was initially planned by Smosarski to be undertaken by bicycle, but Jeliński persuaded the group to use a car instead. To fund the purchase of the car, Jeliński and Ława sold most of their belongings.

The travelers set off in a Ford Model T specially adapted by the Centralne Warsztaty Samochodowe. The trip, thanks to governmental support (including the Ministry of Internal Affairs and Ministry of Foreign Affairs) and non-governmental support (from organizations such as the Polish Scouting and Guiding Association, Sokół movement, Polish Automobile Club, Polish Olympic Committee, and Polish Economic Association), became known as the Polish Scouts' Round-the-World Expedition (participants received patches in English reading Polish Scouts Round the World). Among their luggage, the group carried two rifles, four revolvers, a tent, a portable radio, a gramophone, and a pleograph.

The route of the expedition passed through Czechoslovakia, Austria, Hungary, Yugoslavia, and Italy. In Rome, Ława left the group due to increasing problems with his behavior. The remaining three continued through Sicily to Tunis and Algiers, where Bredschneider ended his journey, finding further travel tiring and unprofitable. Jeliński and Smosarski continued the trip. In Casablanca, they loaded the car onto the Sinsinnawa ship bound for North America. US immigration authorities did not allow Smosarski, who was ill with trachoma, to enter; Jeliński continued alone. Thanks to his perseverance (he gave many lectures to the Polish diaspora) and the help of Polish Americans, he traveled through the United States (from New York through Washington – where he had an audience with President Coolidge – Pittsburgh, Detroit – from where he continued in a new Buick Master Six – Cleveland, Buffalo, Niagara Falls, Chicago, Milwaukee, Saint Louis, Denver, Los Angeles to San Francisco). In Toledo, he declined a young Polish woman's offer to join him on his journey as inappropriate. The journey continued by ship Taiyō Maru from Hawaii to Japan, where he traveled from Yokohama to Kobe (through Kamakura, around Mount Fuji, Nikkō, Tokyo, Kyoto, Osaka). He planned to return to Poland through China, but due to the ongoing civil war there, he abandoned the plan to travel through India because of insufficient funds. He loaded his car onto the Kashima Maru ship and, through the Suez Canal (Port Said), visiting ports in Nagasaki, Shanghai, Penang Island, Hong Kong, Singapore, and Colombo on Ceylon, he reached Marseille. He then returned through France, Belgium, and Germany to Poland. The trip lasted over two years, from 30 May 1926 to 31 October 1928.

During the expedition, the travelers met many heads of state, mayors of various cities, and university professors. Among those who hosted them were: President of Poland Ignacy Mościcki, Marshal Józef Piłsudski, President of Czechoslovakia Tomáš Masaryk, President of Austria Michael Hainisch, Admiral Miklós Horthy, Italian Prime Minister Benito Mussolini, Pope Pius XI, President of the United States John Calvin Coolidge Jr., Japanese Minister Gotō Shinpei, French Prime Minister Gaston Doumergue, and King of Belgium Albert I. Information about the expedition appeared in Polish and foreign newspapers (including American, Japanese, and German), with about 2,000 articles published about it.

Upon his return, Jeliński was greeted by a large crowd of Warsaw residents, and he was received by President Mościcki.

The expedition was described by Władysław Umiński in the book Pod flagą polską samochodem naokoło świata (Under the Polish Flag: Around the World by Car) published in 1929.

== Later years ==
During World War II, he was involved in the resistance against the occupiers. His family home was used to store weapons for the Home Army units, and he also participated in the Volunteer Fire Department in Stara Miłosna.

== Awards and honors ==
- Eagle Scout – 1928
- Silver Cross of Merit – 20 September 1929

== Bibliography ==
- Umiński, Władysław (1929). Pod polską flagą samochodem na około świata. Przez skauta Jerzego Jelińskiego [Under the Polish Flag: By Car Around the World. By Scout Jerzy Jeliński] (in Polish).
