= Sebastian Fitzek =

German writer and journalist

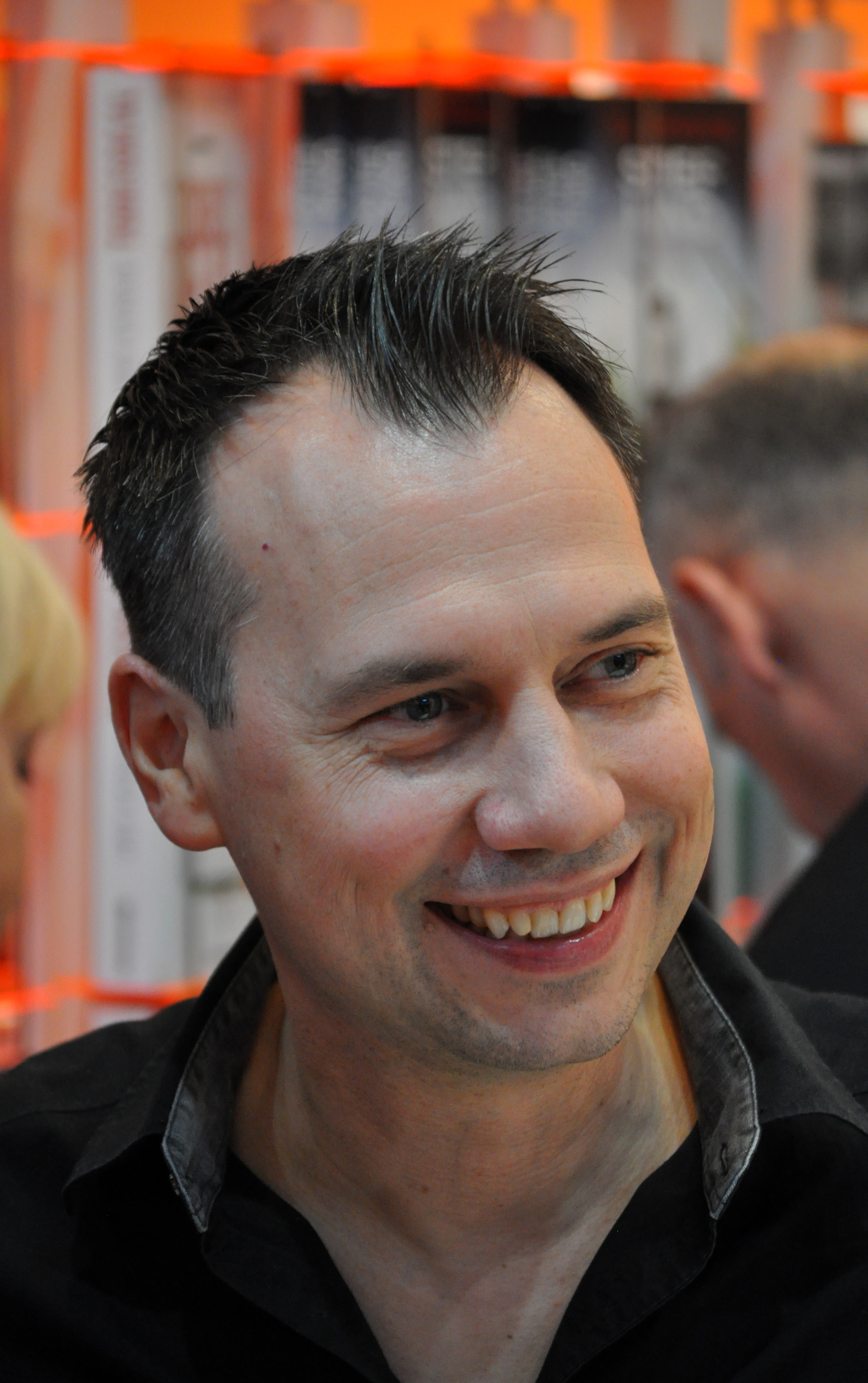
- At the Leipzig book fair in 2017
- Born: Sebastian David Fitzek; October 13, 1971 (age 54); West Berlin, West Germany
- Education: Humboldt University of Berlin (PhD)
- Occupation: Writer
- Children: 3
- Writing career
- Pen name: Max Rhode
- Language: German
- Years active: 2000-present
- Genre: Crime thriller
- Notable works: Therapy, The Package
- Website: sebastianfitzek.de

Sebastian David Fitzek (born 13 October 1971 in West Berlin) is a German writer and journalist. His first book, Therapy (dt. Die Therapie), was a bestseller in Germany in 2006, toppling The Da Vinci Code from the first position. Fitzek is currently one of the most successful writers of Germany.

== Biography ==
Sebastian Fitzek was born in West Berlin and grew up with his father, headmaster of the Lilienthal-Gymnasium in Berlin-Lichterfelde, and his mother, a teacher. After attending High school at the Charlottenburger Wald-Gymnasium, Fitzek began studying for a degree in veterinary medicine but withdrew from the degree programme after 3 months. He attended law school until the first state examination, earned his doctorate degree in copyright and then worked as editor-in-chief and program director for different radio stations in Germany.

He wrote his first book titled Professor Udolphs Buch der Namen with Jürgen Udolph, which came out in 2005. Since 2006, Fitzek started to write psycho-thriller novels, which all became a best-seller.

His very first novel was Therapy (dt. Die Therapie). He got his idea for Therapy in 2000 while waiting for a girlfriend in the waiting room of an orthopedist's office. It contains similar themes to the urban legend the Vanishing Hotel Room (also known as The Vanishing Lady), however, inspiration from the story has not been officially confirmed. After 13 cancellations from different editors, he finally released his book in July, 2006 under Droemer Knaur Verlag. Therapy awas turned into a TV series in 2023. In 2007, Therapy was nominated for best crime-debut for the Friedrich-Glauser-Award.

His next novel, Amok game. (dt. Amokspiel.), was released in 2007 and Goldkind Film AG bought the movie rights for it. In 2012, his very first film version of The Child (dt. Das Kind) came out.

On 29 October 2016, he published his book The Package (dt. Das Paket.).

In 2017, he published EightNight. (dt. AchtNacht.) and his first children's book called Pupsi & Stinki together with illustrator Jörn Stollmann. In 2017, EightNight was the bestselling work of fiction in Germany.

In 2018, The Package was the bestselling work of fiction in Germany. The Inmate (dt. Der Insasse) peaked at number 3.

Near the end of February 2018, he created the Viktor Crime Awards, where a new voice for thriller and crime literature would be awarded. The first winner was writer Michaela Kastel with So Dark the Forest (dt. So dunkel der Wald).

In November, 2020 The Package was published in English by Head of Zeus, translated by Jamie Bulloch.

== Influences ==
According to Fitzek himself, he was inspired by Enid Blyton, Michael Ende and Alfred Weidemann during his childhood and later by Stephen King, Michael Crichton and John Grisham. Today, he reads everything written by Harlan Coben.

== Personal life ==
Sebastian Fitzek lives in Berlin. He married his wife in 2010. In August 2019, he announced his separation from his wife via Facebook. Fitzek has 3 children.

== Works ==
=== Fiction (Psychothriller) ===
Year	Original title	English version	ISBN	Editor	Genre	Writer	Ref.
2006	Die Therapie	Therapy (transl. by Sally-Ann Spencer)	978-3-426-63309-0	Knaur Taschenbuchverlag	Psycho-thriller	Sebastian Fitzek	
2007	Amokspiel.	Amok (transl. by Jamie Lee Searle)	978-3-426-63718-0	Knaur Taschenbuchverlag	Psycho-thriller	Sebastian Fitzek	
2008	Das Kind.	The Child (transl. by John Brownjohn)	978-3-426-63793-7	Knaur Taschenbuchverlag	Psycho-thriller	Sebastian Fitzek	
2008	Der Seelenbrecher.	The Soul Breaker (transl. by John Brownjohn)	978-3-426-63792-0	Knaur Taschenbuchverlag	Psycho-thriller	Sebastian Fitzek	
2010	Splitter.	Splinter (transl. by John Brownjohn)	978-3-426-50372-0	Knaur Taschenbuchverlag	Psycho-thriller	Sebastian Fitzek	
2011	Der Augensammler.	The Eye Collector (transl. by John Brownjohn)	978-3-426-50375-1	Knaur Taschenbuchverlag	Psycho-thriller	Sebastian Fitzek	
2011	Nicht einschlafen (Shortstory)	Do not fall asleep	ASIN B0076OCDU8	Knaur Taschenbuchverlag	Psycho-thriller	Sebastian Fitzek	
2012	Der Augenjäger.	The Eye Hunter (transl. by John Brownjohn)	978-3-426-50373-7	Knaur Taschenbuchverlag	Psycho-thriller	Sebastian Fitzek	
2013	Der Nachtwandler.	The Nightwalker (transl. by Jamie Lee Searle)	978-3-426-50374-4	Knaur Taschenbuchverlag	Psycho-thriller	Sebastian Fitzek	
2013	Noah.	Noah	978-3-404-17878-0	Bastei Lübbe	Psycho-thriller	Sebastian Fitzek	
2014	Passagier 23.	Passenger 23 (transl. by Jamie Bulloch)	978-3-426-51017-9	Knaur Taschenbuchverlag	Psycho-thriller	Sebastian Fitzek	
2015	Die Blutschule.	The blood school	978-3-404-17502-4	Bastei Lübbe	Psycho-thriller	Max Rhode (Pseudonym)	
2015	Das Joshua-Profil.	The Joshua-profile	978-3-404-17948-0	Bastei Lübbe	Psycho-thriller	Sebastian Fitzek	
2016	Das Paket.	The Package (transl. by Jamie Bulloch)	978-3-426-51018-6	Droemer Knaur Verlag	Psycho-thriller	Sebastian Fitzek	
2017	AchtNacht.	EightNight	978-3-426-52108-3	Knaur Taschenbuchverlag	Psycho-thriller	Sebastian Fitzek	
2017	Flugangst 7a.	Seat 7a (transl. by Steve Anderson)	978-3-426-51019-3	Droemer Knaur Verlag	Psycho-thriller	Sebastian Fitzek	
2018	Der Insasse.	The Inmate (transl. by Jamie Bulloch)	978-3-426-51944-8	Droemer Knaur Verlag	Psycho-thriller	Sebastian Fitzek	
2019	Das Geschenk.	The Gift (transl. by Jamie Bulloch)	978-3-426-28154-3	Droemer Knaur Verlag	Psycho-thriller	Sebastian Fitzek	
2020	Der Heimweg.	Walk Me Home (transl. by Jamie Bulloch)	978-3-426-28155-0	Droemer Knaur Verlag	Psycho-thriller	Sebastian Fitzek	
2021	Playlist.	Playlist (transl. by Jamie Bulloch)	978-3-426-28156-7	Droemer Knaur Verlag	Psycho-thriller	Sebastian Fitzek	
2022	Mimik	Mimik (transl. by Jamie Bulloch)	978-3-426-28157-4	Droemer Knaur Verlag	Psycho-thriller	Sebastian Fitzek	
2023	Die Einladung		978-3-426-28158-1	Droemer Knaur Verlag	Psycho-thriller	Sebastian Fitzek	

=== Fiction (Collaboration) ===
Year	Original title	English version	ISBN	Editor	Genre	Writer	Ref.
2008	Tierische Helden.	Animal Heroes	ASIN B0038JPIBQ	Der Club Verlag	Non-fiction	Charlotte Link, Sebastian Fitzek, Iny Lorentz, Jeffery Deaver, Amy Tan, Wolf Serno, Elke Heidenreich, Eva Völler (and many more)	
2009	Tödliche Gaben.	Deadly Gifts	978-3499-25783-4	Rowohlt Taschenbuch Verlag	Crime	Simon Beckett, Linwood Barclay, Sebastian Fitzek, Chris Mooney, Jay Bonansinga, Felicitas Mayall, Leena Lehtolainen, Kate Pepper, Oliver Bottini, Veit Heinichen, Friedrich Ani.	
2010	Weisser Schnee, rotes Blut: Mörderisch gute Weihnachtsgeschichten.	White Snow, red blood: Murderous good Christmas-Stories	978-3550-08741-7	Ullstein Hardcover Verlag	Crime	Friedrich Ani, Anne Chaplet, Zoran Drvenkar, Sebastian Fitzek, Elisabeth Herrmann, Robert Hültner, Linus Reichlin, Andrea Maria Schenkel, Heinrich Steinfest, Michael Theurillat, Jan Costin Wagner.	
2010	P.S. Ich töte dich.	P.S. I kill you.	978-3-426-50857-2	Knaur TB Verlag	Thriller	Sebastian Fitzek, Val McDermid, Thomas Thiemeyer, Torkil Damhaug, Petra Busch, Michael Connelly, Markus Heitz, Michael Koryta, Steve Mosby, Judith Merchant, Jens Lapidus, Markus Stromiedel, Jilliane Hoffman.	
2012	Abgeschnitten.	Cut off.	978-3-426-51091-9	Knaur TB Verlag	Thriller	Sebastian Fitzek, Michael Tsokos	
2016	Mord am Hellweg VIII. (Glaube.Liebe.Leichenschau)	Murder on Hellweg VIII.	978-3894-25474-2	GRAFIT Verlag	Crime	Bernhard Aichner, Mechtild Borrmann, Horst Eckert, Jürgen Ehlers, Sebastian Fitzek, Frl. Krise und Frau Freitag, Sascha Gutzeit, Georg Haderer, Kathrin Heinrichs, Carsten Sebastian Henn, Elisabeth Herrmann, Susanne Kliem, Ria Klug, Judith Merchant, Gisa Pauly, Till Raether, Arno Strobel, Su Turhan, Matthias Wittekindt, Rainer Wittkamp, Jörg Steinleitner, Christa Bernuth, Theresa Prammer	
2019	Auris.	Auris	978-3-426-30718-2	Droemer TB Verlag	Thriller	Writer: Vincent Kliesch / Idea: Sebastian Fitzek	
2020	Auris 2. — "Die Frequenz des Todes"	Auris 2. - "The frequency of death"	978-3-426-30760-1	Droemer TB Verlag	Thriller	Writer: Vincent Kliesch / Idea: Sebastian Fitzek	
2020	Identität 1142	Identity 1142	978-3-426-28266-3	Droemer HC Verlag	Crime	Wulf Dorn, Andreas Gruber, Romy Hausmann, Daniel Holbe, Vincent Kliesch, Charlotte Link, Ursula Poznanski, Frank Schätzing, Michael Tsokos, Sebastian Fitzek, Melanie Bottke, Annika Bühnemann, Livia Fröhlich, Saskia Hehl, Robert Hönatsch, Vanessa Krypczyk, Pia Schmidt, Anne Schmitz, Julian Gabriel Schneider, Mordechai SImons, Gabriele Störzinger, Kathy Tailor, Michael Thode	

=== Non-Fiction ===
Year	Original title	English translation	ISBN	Editor	Writer	Ref.
2000	Die unbekannte Nutzungsart	The Unknown Type Of Use	978-3830-50096-4	Berliner Wissenschaftsverlag	Sebastian Fitzek	
2002	Die 10 grössten Radio-Geheimnisse	The 10 Biggest Radio-Secrets	978-3831-11219-7	Books On Demand	Rüdiger Kreklau, Sebastian Fitzek	
2005	Professor Udolphs Buch der Namen: Woher sie kommen – Was sie bedeuten	Professor Udolph's Book of Names: Where They Come From - What They Mean	978-3-570-00879-9	C. Bertelsmann Verlag	Jürgen Udolph, Sebastian Fitzek	
2017	Pupsi & Stinki	Pupsi & Stinki	978-3629-14237-5	Pattloch Geschenkbuch	Writer: Sebastian Fitzek / Illustrator: Jörn Stollmann	
2019	Fische, die auf Bäume klettern.	Fish climbing trees	978-3426-79052-6	Droemer HC Verlag	Sebastian Fitzek	

=== Audio books ===
Year	Original title	English version	Speaker	Ref.
2007	Die Therapie	Therapy	Simon Jäger	
2007	Amokspiel.	Amok game	Simon Jäger	
2007	Das Kind.	The Child	Simon Jäger	
2008	Der Seelenbrecher.	The Soul Breaker	Simon Jäger, Sebastian Fitzek	
2009	Splitter.	Splinter	Simon Jäger	
2010	Der Augensammler.	The Eye Collector	Simon Jäger	
2011	Der Augenjäger.	The Eye Hunter	Simon Jäger	
2013	Der Nachtwandler.	The Nightwalker	Simon Jäger	
2013	Noah.	Noah	Simon Jäger	
2014	Passagier 23.	Passenger 23	Simon Jäger	
2015	Das Joshua-Profil.	The Joshua-Profile	Simon Jäger	
2016	Das Paket	The Package	Simon Jäger	
2017	AchtNacht.	EightNight	Simon Jäger	
2017	Flugangst 7a.	Seat 7a	Simon Jäger	
2018	Der Insasse.	The Inmate	Simon Jäger	
2019	Das Geschenk.	The Present	Simon Jäger	
2020	Der Heimweg.	Walk Me Home	Simon Jäger	

== Film versions ==
=== Film ===
Year	Title	Director	Cast	Ref.
2012	The Child	Zsolt Bács	Eric Roberts, Christian Traeumer, Sunny Mabrey, Ben Becker, Peter Greene, Reiner Schöne, Clemens Schick, Dieter Hallervorden	
2018	Das Joshua-Profil	Jochen Alexander Freydank	Torben Liebrecht, Lina Hüesker, Franziska Weisz, Armin Rohde, Inez Bjørg David, Max Hopp, Katy Karrenbauer, David Nathan	
2018	Cut Off	Christian Alvart	Moritz Bleibtreu, Jasna Fritzi Bauer, Lars Eidinger, Fahri Yardım, Barbara Prakopenka	
2018	Amok	Oliver Schmitz	Franziska Weisz, Kai Schumann, Eko Fresh, Manuel Mairhofer, Lena Reinhold, Nicki von Tempelhoff, Johann von Bülow, Christian Tramitz	
2018	Passagier 23 —Verschwunden auf hoher See	Alexander Dierbach	Lucas Gregorowicz, Oliver Mommsen, Picco von Groote, Kim Riedle, Annalee Ranft, Liane Forestieri, Judy Winter	

== Theater shows ==
Year	Original title	Director	Cast	Ref.
2019	Der Seelenbrecher.	Benjamin Breutel	Moritz Stursberg, Moritz Heiermann, Jens Kalkhorst, Miriam Kalkreuth, Stephanie Spichala, Denny Pflanz, Doris Hartmann, Niklas Selz	
2016	Die Therapie.	Wolfgang Rumpf	Thomas Linke, Esther Esche, Silvio Hildebrandt, Martha Tham, Paulina Stöhr	
2016	Passagier 23.	Thomas Wingrich	Silvio Hildebrandt, Katrin Martin, Vera Müller, Charlotte Neef, Katharina Zapatka, Helene Jany, Marlene Müller, Pauline Stöhr, Martha Tham, Josephine Nahrstedt, Greta Ipfelkofer, Alexandra Maria Johannknecht, Susanne Meyer, Carmen Zehentmeier, Matti Wien, André Zimmermann, Alejandro Ramon Alonso, Jean Maesér, Maria Jany, Gundula Piepenbring, Kristin Schulze, Jeanniene Gaspar, Nicole Bunge, Peter Dulke, Shero Khalil	
2019	Das Paket.	Marc Gruppe	Unknown	

== Board and card games ==
Year	Name	Publisher	Creator	Ref.
2017	Safehouse	moses Verlag	Marco Teubner	
2018	Black Stories - Sebastian Fitzek Edition	moses Verlag	Bernhard Skopnik	
2019	Safehouse - Das Würfelspiel	moses Verlag	Marco Teubner	
2019	Killercruise	moses Verlag	Marco Teubner	

== Awards and nominations ==
Year	Award	Category	Work	Result	Ref.
2007	Friedrich-Glauser-Awards	Best Crime-Debut	Die Therapie	Nominated	
2010	LovelyBooks Awards	Tension (Crime & Thriller)	Der Augensammler.	Won	
2011	LovelyBooks Awards	Tension (Crime & Thriller)	Der Augenjäger.	Won	
2012	LovelyBooks Awards	Tension (Crime & Thriller)	Abgeschnitten.	Won	
2014	LovelyBooks Awards	Crime & Thriller	Passagier 23.	Won	
2015	LovelyBooks Awards	Crime & Thriller	Das Joshua-Profil.	Won	
2016	European Crime Fiction Star Award	Best Crime Fiction Writer	Himself	Won	
2016	LovelyBooks Awards	Crime & Thriller	Das Paket.	Won	
2016	LovelyBooks Awards	Best Audio Book	Das Paket.	Won	
2016	LovelyBooks Awards	Best Book Cover	Das Paket.	Won	
2017	European Crime Fiction Star Award	Best Crime Fiction Writer	Himself	Won	
2017	LovelyBooks Awards	Crime & Thriller	Flugangst 7a.	Won	
2017	LovelyBooks Awards	Best Audio Book	Flugangst 7a.	Won	
2018	LovelyBooks Awards	Crime & Thriller	Der Insasse.	Won	
2019	LovelyBooks Awards	Crime & Thriller	Das Geschenk.	Won	
