= Vanishing Hotel Room =

Urban legend from 1897

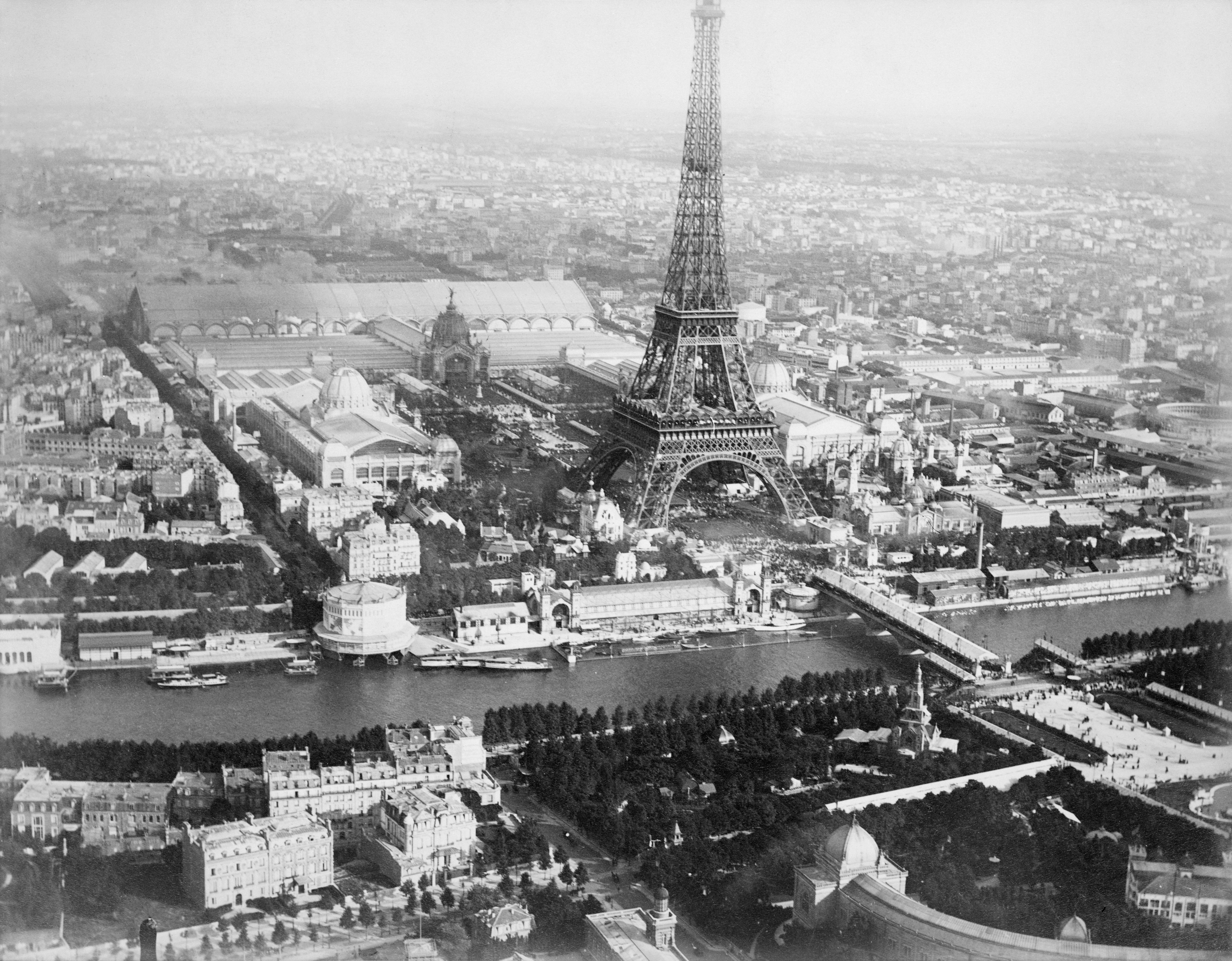
The Paris Exposition of 1889

The Vanishing Hotel Room (also known as The Vanishing Lady) is an urban legend which alleges that during an international exposition in Paris, a daughter who returned after leaving her mother in a hotel room found the woman gone, and the hotel staff professed to have no knowledge of the missing woman.

== Legend ==
A woman's mother is taken ill while they are traveling together in a foreign country. Leaving her mother resting in a hotel bed, the daughter makes a trip across town to pick up a needed prescription. Upon returning, she finds that both her mother and the hotel room they were staying in have disappeared. The staff say they do not remember having seen either her or her mother before.

== Origin ==
According to the Quote Investigator website and urban legend researcher Bonnie Taylor-Blake, the author of the earliest known instance of the legend was Nancy Vincent McClelland, who wrote a version in an article titled A Mystery of the Paris Exposition in The Philadelphia Inquirer of November 14, 1897. In this version, at the end, the daughter is told the truth by a French policeman about her mother's death from disease. The Quote Investigator and Taylor-Blake also found a version of the legend run in the Detroit Free Press in 1898 titled Porch Tales: The Disappearance of Mrs. Kneeb, written by Kenneth Herford. It is theorised that "Kenneth Herford" was a pen name for Karl Harriman.

== Variations ==
There are multiple variations of the Vanishing Hotel Room story. Usually, the story is set in Paris, France, during the Paris Exposition of 1889 or that of 1900, whither, most commonly, a woman with her daughter have just traveled. Sometimes, the women in the story are unrelated, but are traveling companions of roughly the same age; rarely, both are male. In some versions, the daughter gets sent to a mental hospital, where she spends the rest of her days.

In a version printed in the July 6 and July 13, 1929, issues of The New Yorker written by Alexander Woollcott and included in his book While Rome Burns (1934), it is revealed that the mother died of plague and that the hotel management and the police have kept her death a secret so as to prevent mass panic and hysteria throughout the city, and so that visitors will not leave, thus ensuring and maintaining the hotel's large financial income.

== In popular culture ==
The story inspired several novels, including The End of Her Honeymoon by Marie Belloc Lowndes (1913), She Who Was Helena Cass by Lawrence Rising (1920), The Vanishing Of Mrs. Fraser by Basil Thomson (1925), The Torrents of Spring by Ernest Hemingway (1926) and films such as The Midnight Warning (1932), The Lady Vanishes (1938), Covered Tracks (1938), So Long at the Fair (1950), Dangerous Crossing, Alfred Hitchcock Presents: Into Thin Air/The Lady Vanishes (1955), Bunny Lake Is Missing (1965), Thriller: Come Out, Come Out, Wherever You Are (1974), The Forgotten (2004), and Flightplan (2005). It was also featured as a "true story" in a 2002 episode of the Fox television program Beyond Belief: Fact or Fiction in the episode Room 245.

An adaptation of the story appears in the Scary Stories to Tell in the Dark book trilogy titled Maybe You Will Remember from Scary Stories 3: More Tales to Chill your Bones (1991) and in the short story Hotel Splendide by Australian author Kerry Greenwood, written for a January issue of Women's Weekly magazine. It features one of Greenwood's most notable characters, the wealthy aristocrat and private investigator Phryne Fisher.

Similar themes have been explored in, but are not officially credited to, the novel (2006) and TV series (2023) Therapy by German author Sebastian Fitzek.
