= Flibustierowie =

Adventure novel by Władysław Umiński

- Author: Władysław Umiński
- Language: Polish
- Genre: adventure fiction
- Publication date: 1898
- Publication place: Poland

Tajemnicza bandera i flibustierowie (The Mysterious Banner and the Buccaneers) – later editions titled Flibustierowie (Buccaneers) or less commonly Tajemnicza Bandera (The Mysterious Banner), sometimes with the subtitle Powieść na tle dziejów Indii Zachodnich (A Novel Set Against the History of the West Indies) – is an exotic adventure novel for young readers by Władysław Umiński from 1898 (serialized; book edition from 1901). The book has seen around 10 editions, most of them during the Polish People's Republic era; the communist government found the book's theme – criticism of capitalism and the United States – appealing. The novel tells the story of Poles participating in the Spanish–American War.

== History of editions ==
The novel was serialized in the illustrated magazine Przyjaciel Dzieci (issues 22–53) in 1898 and then published as a book in 1901 by Michał Arct's publishing house. Subsequent editions appeared in 1922, 1933, 1951, 1953, 1954, 1956, 1959, 1967, and 1970. Generally, the title was shortened to Flibustierowie (Buccaneers), except for the first edition and the 1933 one, titled Tajemnicza Bandera (The Mysterious Banner). The novel was also translated into Serbo-Croatian (as Kubański ustanici in 1964) and Slovak (as Flibustieri in 1956). In 1969, it was adapted into a radio play titled O wolność Kuby (For Cuba's Freedom) by R. Pisarski.

== Plot ==
The plot of the book is partially based on the real-life experiences of Polish immigrants. It tells the adventures of two Poles, Józef and Wacław Kos, sons of a Polish emigrant from a village in Kuyavia, who, after a maritime disaster, join the Cuban guerrillas during the 1895–1898 uprising (which preceded the Spanish–American War), where they encounter two other Poles. In the novel, Umiński also critically portrays "an American buccaneer unit, i.e., American partisans formed in the United States, supposedly to help the insurgents, but in reality [intending] to destroy competing plantations in Cuba". According to a post-war reviewer, the book tells the story of "the shameful exploitation of honest immigrants and Cubans by American businessmen who finance a military ship to fight the Spaniards in order to stir disorder and chaos in Cuba before the Spanish–American War".

== Reception and analysis ==
Like many of Umiński's other works, this book is also considered to be inspired by the writings of Jules Verne, specifically his novel Texar's Revenge, or, North Against South. However, Stanisław Arct classified it as original Polish literature.

During the interwar period, the novel was reviewed by the Book Evaluation Committee for School Youth Reading. The reviewer wrote that the "idea of the book is the slogan of the fight for freedom, in which a few Poles participate selflessly. This slogan, realized by the novel's heroes, may have a certain moral influence on young readers, although it concerns relations that are too distant and foreign to Polish readers". The book, assessed as "written in a fairly correct language" and "interesting, but without outstanding literary value", was classified in 1929 as "suitable" for children aged from 11 to 15 years old.

In 1946, M. Andrea, in Polish American Studies, described the book as "a very interesting adventure novel for youth".

In 1964, Krystyna Kuliczkowska commented on the novel as containing "sharp accents of social criticism", writing that the author exposes American machinations in this way: "Capitalists sacrifice hundreds of thousands to earn millions. They expect that when the Spaniards are expelled from Cuba, trade will flourish there, new outlets for lying capital will open; or they are sugar planters betting on a rise in their goods; they wish the uprising to last as long as possible, so Cuba will stop producing sugar, thus driving up the price of this commodity, and they have stockpiled large reserves. Or they could be tobacco planters who are bothered by the competition from Havana cigars’" In 1973, she also wrote that the work contains a message not only of survival, in the context of the "Pole abroad" motif but also the motif of "Polish traditions of freedom" and the idea of national liberation struggle, with colonialism criticism being "a transparent allusion to the situation of Poles".

Pedagogue Łukasz Kurdybacha, in his Historia wychowania (History of Education) from 1968, spoke positively about the book, writing that it is one of the "novels of enduring value, showing vital national liberation ideas and the plight of wandering emigrants".

In 1972, a reviewer from the Polish Librarians Association described the book as "very readable" and "a valuable read for readers aged 12 and up", also noting that at the time of its publication, the novel was read as an allusion to Poland's situation during the partitions and the struggle against the occupiers. The reviewer highlighted the "noble selflessness" of the Polish heroes, which the author "contrasts with the treacherous activities of American buccaneers who, under the guise of aiding the insurgents, expel the Spaniards to secure their own interests and take control of Cuba".

In 1988, the book was described as "written with social commitment" and "showing the plight of Poles abroad".
