= Krzyż i półksiężyc =

1913 adventure novel by Władysław Umiński

- Author: Władysław Umiński
- Language: Polish
- Genre: adventure fiction, military science fiction
- Publication date: 1913
- Publication place: Poland

Krzyż i półksiężyc. Powieść dla młodzieży na tle ostatniej wojny bałkańskiej (The Cross and the Crescent. A Novel for Youth Set Against the Backdrop of the Last Balkan War) is an adventure novel for young readers by Władysław Umiński, published in 1913. The story is set against the backdrop of historical events (the First Balkan War) and includes a science fiction element.

The novel was illustrated with 12 drawings by Emil Lindeman.

== Publication history ==
The novel was first published in 1913 by Gebethner and Wolff and was reprinted in 1924.

== Plot ==
The backdrop of the novel is the First Balkan War of 1912, and the protagonists are Poles (including pilots Colonel Zadorski and Captain Zabiełła, as well as Polish female doctors) from the Austrian partition. They are members of the Volunteer Aerial Intelligence Unit ("a secret organization supporting the Slavs fighting in the Balkans"), assisting the Christian Balkan League (the eponymous "cross") against Muslim Turkey (the eponymous "crescent"). The story also features a "spy scandal" in the background.

A reviewer in 1913 summarized the plot as follows:

We have here a volunteer aerial fleet unit that sets off from Paris with Colonel Zadorski and Captain Zabiełła at the helm to perform intelligence service for the allied army. Miraculous, yet non-existent aircraft, the self-sacrifice of Poles and Polish women, images of heroic but brutal war – this is the content of this colorful tale.

== Analysis ==
The central theme of the novel is the participation of Poles in liberation struggles outside their homeland. The science fiction element, in the form of "new type of aircraft used for flying batteries" allows the work to be classified as a subgenre of military science fiction. According to The Encyclopedia of Science Fiction, this makes the novel "perhaps the first example" of this genre in Polish literature.

== Reception ==
In 1913, the novel was reviewed in Tygodnik Illustrowany. The reviewer praised the book, writing, "Alongside heroic deeds, a grim picture of war unfolds before the readers, revealing the unleashed instincts driven by the desire for revenge for centuries-old wrongs. The well-emphasized idea of the Balkan Slavs' liberation struggle is a notable pedagogical merit of Umiński's interesting book." The reviewer also praised Lindeman's illustrations as "effective".

In the same year, the book was reviewed in Nowa Gazeta. The reviewer found the novel "colorful", but considered the overall concept to be "less fortunate", stating, "The images of the terrible Balkan wars... will not soon be a suitable subject for a Christmas tale for Polish children. This is still too contemporary a story". In 1914, Przegląd Powszechny briefly but positively reviewed the novel, calling it "a very good story for young readers aged from 12 to 15 years old."

In 1973, Krystyna Kuliczkowska criticized the novel, writing that it did not measure up to Umiński's previous works on similar themes and that "the main plot is lost in a sensational spy scandal... the whole concept is disjointed and implausible." She also criticized the blending of the authentic, realistic backdrop of the novel with a science fiction idea of "flying batteries".
