= Divagations =

1897 prose collection by Stéphane Mallarmé

- First edition title page
- Author: Stéphane Mallarmé
- Language: French
- Publisher: Bibliothéque-Charpentier
- Publication date: 1897
- Publication place: France
- Pages: 377

Divagations is an 1897 prose collection by the French writer Stéphane Mallarmé. The book introduces the idea of "critical poems", a mixture between critical essays and prose poems. The book is divided into two parts, first a series of prose poems, and then the actual "divagations" – "wanderings" or "ravings".

== Contents ==
- "Anecdotes or Poems"
- "Volumes on My Divan"
- "Capsule Sketches and Full-Length Portraits"
- "Richard Wagner"
- "Scribbled at the Theater"
- "Crisis of Verse"
- "About the Book"
- "The Mystery in Letters"
- "Services"
- "Important Miscellaneous News Briefs"

== See also ==
- 1897 in literature
- 19th-century French literature
- Symbolism (arts)
