= Krwawy chleb =

Adventure novel by Władysław Umiński

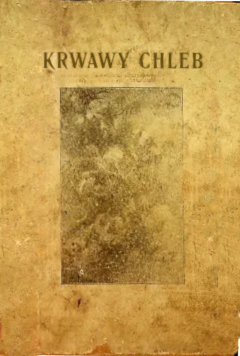
- Author: Władysław Umiński
- Language: Polish
- Genre: Adventure fiction
- Publication date: 1909
- Publication place: Poland

Krwawy chleb. Przygody polskiego tułacza (Bloody Bread: The Adventures of a Polish Wanderer) (Note: Later editions titled Znojny chleb (Toilsome Bread); the subtitle was omitted or changed in some editions to Przygody młodego tułacza polskiego w Europie i w Ameryce (Adventures of a Young Polish Wanderer in Europe and America) or Przygody robotnika polskiego w Ameryce (Adventures of a Polish Worker in America).) is an adventure novel for young readers by Władysław Umiński. It was first serialized in 1909, before being published as a book in 1912. The novel saw eight further editions. It depicts the harsh, "bloody" labor of the protagonist, a Polish immigrant in the United States.

== Publication history ==
The novel was first published in serialized form in the illustrated magazine Wieczory Rodzinne in 1909 (issues 5–28, 35–52) and continued into the following year (issues 3-11, 13-26, 28, 32, 35-47, 49–53), before being released as a book in 1912 by Gebethner and Wolff. Subsequent editions appeared in 1916, 1921, 1928, 1948, 1954, 1955, 1957, and 1968. The novel was also translated into English.

Plans to publish the book in 1950 were rejected by the communist censors, with the comment that it was "educationally harmful, with racist overtones, glorifying the United States"; however, it was approved for publication four years afterward.

== Plot ==
The protagonist of the novel is Sobiesław Mrocki, a Polish immigrant searching for work in the New World after deserting from the Prussian Army. He works on coffee plantations in Brazil, where he is exploited, escapes through the jungle to the United States, fights bandits, works on the railways, in hotels, and in factories, joins the American army, participates in the suppression of the last Native American uprising, and eventually gains wealth and a wife, and becomes the owner of a plantation in California.

== Reception and analysis ==
In 1946, Sister M. Andrea, writing for Polish American Studies, described the book as "highly interesting". She comments that "[t]hough based on actual experiences of emigrants, [the stories] are so colorful that one doubts whether the manifold experiences are true". In 1956, Andrzej Lange in Pamiętnik Literacki described the novel's protagonist as "exploited everywhere". The following year, a reviewer from the Polish Librarians' Association noted that the protagonist, by joining the American army that suppressed the Native American uprising, "achieved his desired prosperity at the cost of betraying his youthful ideals". The reviewer spoke positively of the book, noting that "it is not just a colorful world of adventure. It also tells the truth about the lives [of European immigrants to America]." Pedagogue Łukasz Kurdybacha, in his Historia wychowania (History of Education) from 1968, praised the book, writing that it is one of the "novels of enduring value", presenting "vital ideas of national liberation and the wandering fate of emigrants."

In 1969, Miesięcznik Literacki described the book as a "social novel... noble in its tendency, but literarily mediocre." That same year, a reviewer in Nowe Książki observed that its "happy, even miraculously happy ending has always puzzled critics". The reviewer noted that "despite the American setting, 'Znojny Chleb' is a book about Poles and Polish issues" and recommended paying attention to the afterword by Stanisław Zieliński in the edition, in which he argued that the book "fulfills the native myth of deserved rest in one's homeland" and that the setting in America was dictated by the circumstances in which the book was written (the period of partitions of Poland, on the eve of World War I). Zieliński wrote that this book, "not forgotten by readers", is not "an advertisement" for California but rather, "while maintaining the appearance of an adventure novel, Umiński wrote a book foregrounding sacrifice and struggle [...] Only after the war can one think of home [...] [it is] a book about Poles and the Polish future approaching with war."

In 1973, Krystyna Kuliczkowska wrote that the book refers to themes of Poles in exile and the fight for national liberation, "touching many important social problems, indicating the ambition to address the broader issues relevant to the era." She also pointed out that the protagonists "participate – for wages – in suppressing freedom movements." Earlier, she had written that the book contains "sharp social criticism", specifically drawing attention to the fact that its protagonist "is a member of the multi-million army of Chicago's unemployed, brutally exploited by factory owners during the seasonal work period."
