= Zwycięzcy oceanu =

1890 novel by Władysław Umiński

Zwycięzcy oceanu (Conquerors of the Ocean) is the debut travel-adventure and maritime novel for young adults by Polish writer Władysław Umiński. The book tells the story of three daredevils traveling in a small boat from America to China. It was first published in 1890 serialized in a magazine; it received a book edition in 1891. The novel has been subsequently reprinted several times and translated into Czech.

== Release history ==
The novel was first published in the illustrated magazine Wędrowiec in 1890 in installments (no. 23–52), and then published as a book in 1891. By 1947, the book had received eight editions, including: 1900, 1941, 1943 and 1947. The novel was also translated into Czech. (Vítězové oceánu, 1929).

This was Umiński's first novel; he wrote it when he was 19 years old.

== Plot ==
The book tells the story of two initially quarreling sailors (the younger one, named Elski, is Polish, the older one is an American, Lieutenant Ebb) in a small boat in the Pacific Ocean. The two are engaged in a sports duel. An English millionaire, Morton, joins them. There is also a theme of competition between English and American teams.

== Reception ==
In 1923 a reviewer wrote positively about the book in the Catholic Przegląd Powszechny, praising it for its tone down (no disregard for ethics, "religious indeferentialism") and avoiding theories that were controversial at the time (e.g. "evolutionism" or presenting "pantheistic descriptions of nature").

In 1926, a reviewer of Dziennik Bydgoski expressed his mixed feelings about this novel: 'This book is truly worth reading [however] the reviewer wishes that in the next edition [...] would be shortened by at least 50%, without compromising its engaging and highly informative content".

In the interwar period, c. 1929, the book was reviewed by the Polish Commission for the Assessment of Books for Reading for School Youth. The reviewer wrote that "the characters are likeable", although the antagonist of the novel, "the Englishman Morton, a rich man bored and looking for strong thrills, is critically presented at the beginning ... but he also changes in the end." In the summary of the review it was written that "despite the improbability of some adventures, the book can be read with interest, and the bravery of the characters is admirable." The book, described as "robustly published but poorly illustrated", was designated as "recommended" for children aged 11–14.

== Analysis ==
Like many works of Umiński, the novel is considered to be inspired by the works of Jules Verne. The novel also patriotically presents the motif of the "brave Pole abroad".

As Umiński was also an educator, the book contains numerous information about natural phenomena in the Pacific Ocean.
