= Na drugą planetę =

Science fiction novel by Władysław Umiński

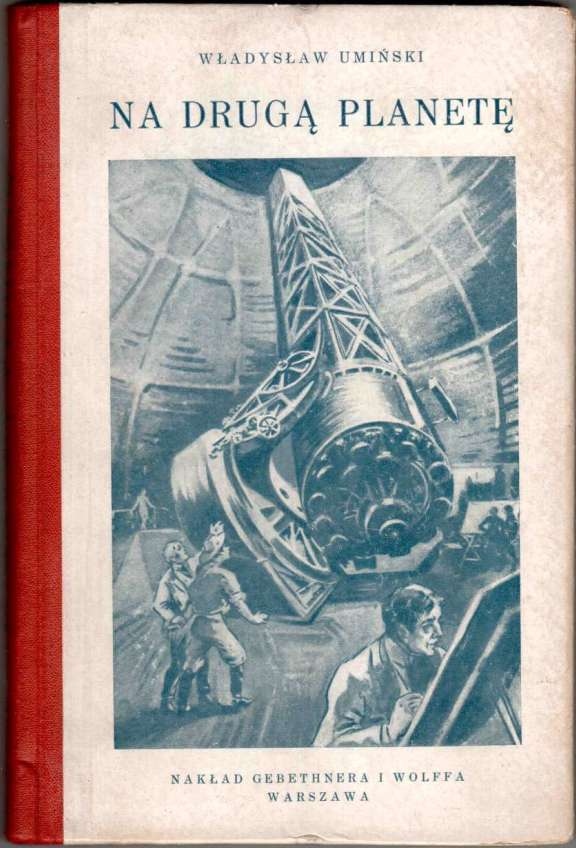
- Cover of the 1929 edition
- Author: Władysław Umiński
- Language: Polish
- Genre: Science fiction
- Publisher: Polish Bookstore of Kazimierz Grendyszyński
- Publication date: 1895
- Publication place: Poland

Na drugą planetę (Note: Polish pronunciation: [na‿ˈdru.ɡɔ̃w̃ plaˈnɛ.tɛ].) (To Another Planet; first editions titled W nieznane światy (Note: Polish pronunciation: [v‿ɲɛˈzna.nɛ ˈɕfja.tɨ].) [Into Unknown Worlds]) is a Polish science fiction novel by Władysław Umiński for young readers. It is among the first Polish science fiction novels, particularly significant for its depiction of interplanetary communication and its focus on Mars. The novel was serialized in a magazine in 1894 and published as a book the following year. It blends elements of contemporary cosmological knowledge about the Solar System, adventure, scientific speculation, and technological optimism, reflecting the influence of Jules Verne and contemporary astronomical speculation about life on Mars.

The story follows Edwin Harting, a young American astronomer obsessed with proving the existence of intelligent life on Mars. Despite skepticism from the scientific community, he persuades a wealthy benefactor to fund the construction of an enormous telescope and an experimental system of light signals to contact the planet. As Harting embarks on dangerous expeditions to transmit signals, he faces numerous challenges, including public ridicule, financial difficulties, and perilous environmental conditions. While his attempts yield ambiguous results, his unwavering belief in scientific progress remains a central theme.

The novel showcases Umiński's deep interest in science and education, incorporating detailed discussions of optics, chemistry, and engineering. However, critics have noted its relatively conservative approach to speculative fiction, as most of its technological innovations—such as an oversized refracting telescope and a method of interplanetary signalling—are exaggerated but plausible extensions of existing science. The book also reflects the era's positivist faith in knowledge and technological advancement, though some later scholars have criticized its lack of attention to the ethical implications of scientific progress, particularly in scenes where indigenous populations suffer unintended consequences of Harting's experiments.

== Plot ==
The novel follows Edwin Harting, a young American astronomer obsessed with establishing contact with intelligent beings on Mars, despite skepticism from the scientific community. Convinced of their existence, he persuades the wealthy millionaire Brighton to fund an ambitious project: the construction of a massive telescope—initially described as having a two-meter lens but later revised to a three-and-a-half-meter diameter—along with an experimental system of light signals using burning aluminium, a technique developed by chemist Barrett.

Their venture is met with widespread ridicule. Practical-minded Americans mock Brighton's extravagant spending, with merchants declaring him either insane or bankrupt, and stock market investors losing trust in his company. Nevertheless, both he and Harting remain undeterred, pressing forward with their grand vision. Alongside the two main characters, the novel introduces key supporting figures, such as journalist Tabb, who spies on the scientists, and chemist Barrett, whose scientific expertise contrasts sharply with Harting's speculative and dream-driven approach.

As Harting embarks on dangerous expeditions to light the signals from remote locations, he encounters numerous life-threatening obstacles, including treacherous terrain, wild animal attacks, and natural disasters, such as earthquakes and dried-up rivers. One of the most striking episodes occurs in Ecuador, where he and his team create a "second sun" using an artificial light signal so powerful that it blinds and burns nearby indigenous people and animals.

Despite his relentless efforts, Harting never receives a definitive response from Mars. Some ambiguous changes in the Martian landscape are observed through an optical spectrometer, but scientific consensus attributes these to reflected sunlight rather than an artificial signal. As his frustration mounts, Harting's obsession deepens, driving him toward madness—or, perhaps, toward a breakthrough that remains hidden from the world. While the novel ends with his fate unresolved, a later work by Umiński, Zaziemskie światy (Worlds Beyond Earth), set in the same universe, suggests that Harting ultimately succeeds in making contact with extraterrestrial life.

== History of editions ==
The book was first published in serialized form in the magazine Przyjaciel Dzieci in 1894, in issues 27 to 48, under the title W nieznane światy. The first book edition (St. Petersburg, 1895, published by the Polish Bookstore of Kazimierz Grendyszyński) also bore the title W nieznane światy. Powieść fantastyczna (Into Unknown Worlds: A Science Fiction Novel). The second edition published there in 1903 had the same title, although other sources refer to the 1913 edition as the second edition. From the 1913 edition onwards, the book was titled Na drugą planetę. Powieść fantastyczna (To the Second Planet: A Science Fiction Novel). The book saw subsequent editions, including those in 1921, 1929, 1930, 1931, 1946, 1956, 1957, 1968, and 1972 (the last editions published by Nasza Księgarnia). Fragments of the last three chapters of the novel, under the title Słońce na Ziemi (The Sun on Earth; also a title of one of said chapters in the novel) were also reprinted in Zbigniew Przyrowski's anthology Nowa cywilizacja (New Civilization) in 1973.

== Analysis ==
=== Inspirations ===
The origin of the novel is partially related to Umiński's own aspirations, as he was fascinated by technology and participated in inventive and construction works, but could not significantly pursue them due to financial problems. Like many of Umiński's other works, this book is also considered to be inspired by Jules Verne's writing, specifically the book Around the Moon (1869). According to Krystyna Kuliczkowska, in later revisions of the work, Umiński became more open to the motif of establishing contact with Mars, possibly influenced by H. G. Wells.

=== Setting ===
Na drugą planetę was one of the first, if not the first, Polish novels dealing with the subject of Mars in a science fiction context. Umiński was deeply interested in science (he wrote popular science columns for various magazines and newspapers) and kept up with the discoveries of Giovanni Schiaparelli and Percival Lowell—astronomers interested in Mars—and contemporary theories about Martian canals. Polish literary scholar Maciej Wróblewski speculated that the setting of a significant part of the novel in Boston (the hometown of Percival Lowell) and the Sierra Madre mountains (where Lowell's observatory was located) might have been an indirect acknowledgment of Lowell's influence by Umiński.

The fact that much of the action of the novel is set in the United States, a country that Umiński associated with advanced technology, was later criticized by censors in the Polish People's Republic, who accused the author of "adoration for America," leading to the book not being reprinted between 1947 and 1955, despite Umiński's efforts.

=== Inventions and gadgets ===
The science fiction elements of the novel include the central role of several inventions (advanced telescope and light signal technology), as well as frequent use of scientific terms like "electric arc" or "attenuation coefficient of the atmosphere," and numbers, including entire paragraphs of calculations. Smuszkiewicz considered the "science fiction element" of the novel to be relatively poor, as—aside from the potential element of life on Mars—one of the main "science fiction" gadgets Umiński described is a refracting telescope, which existed at the time. Umiński simply increased the scale of the telescope (in the first version of the novel, it is a two-meter lens telescope, whereas in reality, the largest such telescope existing at that time had a one-meter lens; in a later version of his novel, Umiński changed the diameter to three and a half meters; however, larger refracting telescopes were never built as they were obsoleted by other types of telescopes). Other science fiction gadgets in the novel include advanced (miniaturized) phonograph technology. The concept of interplanetary communication using burning aluminium is another element of science fiction present in the work. Nonetheless, just like the telescope, these are only advanced and plausible versions of technologies already existing in the real world, well known among science popularizers like Umiński. This is consistent with Umiński's writing style, as he saw himself as an educator and preferred his work to be seen as describing progress in science that he considered realistic and not too far-fetched. Likewise, Wróblewski notes that the science fiction element in the novel is less about the "wonderful" inventions mentioned, which are not particularly impressive compared to many more daring works of the genre, but more about "respect for knowledge and almost uncritical trust in the cognitive possibilities of science."

This was not Umiński's first novel containing elements of science fiction; his Balonem do bieguna (By Balloon to the Pole), serialized in the weekly Wieczory Rodzinne in 1892 and published as a book in 1894, included a futuristic but also plausible model of an airship.

=== Other themes ===
According to Makuch, a Polish literary scholar, the novel follows a fairy-tale structure, where the main character, astronomer Barrett, overcomes various obstacles with the help of other characters.

Makuch notes that the scientific debates in the novel represent a polemic between two approaches to science: the utilitarian/practical (Barrett) and the speculative/dreamer (Harting). Makuch paraphrased what he saw as Umiński's message, which he believed to be his endorsement of Barrett's practical approach as more realistic: "If only Harting restrains his emotions, dedicates himself to work, and describes his achievements using scientific language (a work promised in the last words of the novel), he will surely succeed," and that "one should not forget common sense, as curiosity can lead to... harm, but significant omissions by the narrator indicate that, in the face of knowledge, more is allowed." Makuch therefore sees the novel as a tribute to the desire for knowledge, as Umiński's portrayal of characters who sacrifice much to reach the truth (astronomer Harting, journalist Tabb) is nonetheless positive. As such, the novel fits into the philosophy of Polish positivism (advocacy of reason before emotion), although with a more moderate didactic approach.

== Reception ==
A reviewer from 1894 in Kurier Warszawski praised the novel, writing: "All of Mr. Umiński's science fiction novels fully deserve recognition and support. They add a native element to the rich fairy tales of foreign authors in this genre."

In 1885, a reviewer from the magazine Ateneum wrote about the book. The reviewer commended the educational value of the novel (in particular the "presentation of geographical, climatic, etc., knowledge") and the development of the characters, concluding that "this novel can indeed captivate students of real schools, familiar with natural sciences and mathematics; and, in some scenes, it exhibits an uncommon dramatic power."

Wróblewski and Damian Makuch, another Polish literary scholar, criticize the downplaying of the negative consequences of inventions. In Ecuador, the characters create a "second sun" that generates a light signal, while also inadvertently injuring nearby animals and people; however, Umiński focuses on the positive aspect of human victory over the forces of nature, and the situation of the "blinded and burned indigenous people" is mentioned only briefly. As Makuch writes: "The horror of this phenomenon is ignored, and the fear of modernization is suppressed. The development of science and technology blinds; Umiński does not see the danger lurking behind this bright light."

== Bibliography ==
- Wróblewski, Maciej (2005). "„Na drugą planetę" Władysława Umińskiego, czyli o radości uprawiania nauki" [Władysław Umiński's 'To the Second Planet', or On the Joy of Doing Science]. In Stoff, A.; Brzostek, D. (eds.). Polska literatura fantastyczna: interpretacje [Polish Science Fiction Literature: Interpretations] (in Polish). Wyd. Uniwersytetu Mikołaka Kopernika. ISBN 978-83-231-1907-4.
