= Sally-Ann Spencer =

British translator (born 1970)

Sally-Ann Spence
- Born: Sally-Ann Spence; May 15, 1970; United Kingdom
- Education: University of Oxford
- Occupations: Science educator, entomologist, farmer, presenter
- Known for: Founder of Minibeast Mayhem; founder of Berrycroft Hub; co-founder of Dung Beetle UK Mapping Project
- Awards: British Entomological & Natural History Society Gold Medal (2023)

Sally-Ann Spencer (born May 15, 1970) is a British translator, specialising in German literature. She studied languages at Cambridge University before going to work in the publishing industry. In 2005, she moved to New Zealand, at the same time choosing literary translation as her full-time profession. She completed a PhD on German literature at the Victoria University of Wellington.

As a translator, Spencer has won the Schlegel-Tieck Prize for her translation of Frank Schätzing's sci-fi novel The Swarm. She now lives in Wellington.

In 2015, Sally-Ann Spence was awarded the inaugural Women in German Studies Book Prize for her book proposal on 'Contemporary German-English Translation: Books Across Borders in the Digital Age'.

== Selected translations ==
- Juli Zeh: The Method (Corpus Delicti). Harvill Secker, 2012
- Peter Schössow: My First Car was Red (Mein erstes Auto war rot). Gecko Press, 2011
- Markus Heitz: The War of the Dwarves (Der Krieg der Zwerge). Orbit, 2010
- Markus Heitz: The Dwarves (Die Zwerge). Orbit, 2009
- Sebastian Fitzek: Therapy (Die Therapie). Pan Books, 2008
- Frank Schätzing: The Swarm (Der Schwarm). Hodder and Stoughton, 2006
