= The End of Her Honeymoon =

1913 novel

- Author: Marie Belloc Lowndes
- Language: English
- Genre: Mystery
- Publisher: Methuen (Britain); Scribner (US)
- Publication date: 1913
- Publication place: United Kingdom
- Media type: Print

The End of Her Honeymoon is a 1913 mystery novel by the British writer Marie Belloc Lowndes. It is one of numerous books based on the Vanishing Hotel Room.

== Synopsis ==
During the Exposition Universelle a newly married young British couple arrive in Paris but find it nearly impossible to find a room. Eventually they lodge in an old house. In the morning the wife finds that her husband has completely vanished and the property's owners deny all knowledge that he was ever there.

== Bibliography ==
- Vinson, James. Twentieth-Century Romance and Gothic Writers. Macmillan, 1982.
