= Czarodziejski okręt =

1914 adventure novel by Władysław Umiński

- Author: Władysław Umiński
- Language: Polish
- Genre: adventure fiction, nautical fiction, science fiction
- Publication date: 1914
- Publication place: Poland

Czarodziejski okręt (The Magic Ship) is a nautical robinsonade with science fiction elements for young readers written by Władysław Umiński and serialized in 1914. A book edition was published in 1916. The novel tells the story of a millionaire who spends her vacation on a deserted island and her husband who embarks on a quest to find her using the titular technologically advanced ship.

== Plot ==
A young American aristocrat and millionaire bored with civilization resides on a supposedly deserted island. Her husband sets out to find her using the titular "magic ship", which is not magical but very modern, equipped with advanced communication systems and a seaplane.

== Publication history and reception ==
The novel was first serialized in the illustrated magazine Przyjaciel Dzieci from 1914 to 1915 (issues from 27 to 52 in 1914 and issues from 1 to 28 in 1915) and was later published as a book in 1916 by Gebethner and Wolff. Subsequent editions were released in 1925 and 1933. The novel is classified as a robinsonade, a genre of adventure stories featuring castaways and nautical fiction. Like many of Umiński's works, it is also considered to be inspired by Jules Verne's writings (for example his Mysterious Island), repeating ideas such as "the mystification of a deserted island and the grotesque treatment of the robinsonade". The novel has also been described as atypical for Umiński due to its "lightly ironic tone and complete absence of Polish themes", commonly found in his other works.

The novel can also be categorized as science fiction because Umiński describes advanced, futuristic for his time wireless telegraphy with a range of 5,000 km, and what is effectively a radio, which he calls a "metatelephone". In 1953, writing during the era of the Polish People's Republic, the Polish literary scholar Krystyna Kuliczkowska praised the book for its "sharp criticism" of the "spoiled [female] millionaire", though she criticized the novel for its positive portrayal of her husband. She also found the depiction of the expulsion of the island's inhabitants to provide the millionaire with space for solitary hunting and contemplation to be shocking.

From a contemporary perspective, the novel has been criticized for its racist portrayal of colored natives from the Comoro Islands. Another Polish scholar, Jadwiga Ruszała, highlighted the unusual variant of the robinsonade in this novel – the stay on the deserted island is usually the result of chance and perceived as something negative; however, in this story, it is a planned escape from civilization. The millionaire heroine is not left to fend for herself; more difficult or unpleasant tasks are carried out by the crew of her nearby ship.

In 1925, a reviewer from Przegląd Biblioteczny positively assessed the book, writing: "The book is written with the usual fluency and ease of the author, and is richly and beautifully illustrated, and about the author: a great popularizer of scientific achievements and an excellent storyteller of adventures". A 1957 reviewer categorized this book as one of the weaker works of Umiński. Despite the passage of time, in a 2021 scholarly work, the novel was praised for its brisk action and humor.
