= Nancy Vincent McClelland =

American interior designer

Nancy Vincent McClelland (1877–1959) was the first female president of the first US national association of interior designers, the American Institute of Interior Decorators (A.I.D), which is now called the American Society of Interior Designers (A.S.I.D.) and was one of an early group of female interior decorators practicing during the first decades of the 20th century. McClelland was also an expert on the European/American antiques. She was a writer for interior journals such as: Collier's, Country Life, House Beautiful, and House and Garden. She was an expert on wallpaper and the Scottish furniture designer Duncan Phyfe of New York. She received several rewards for her work. Being multilingual gave her the opportunity to be internationally active and to be known beyond the US as a writer, speaker, interior decorator, wallpaper designer, and collector of antique furniture. She traveled widely and met figures of the time such as Picasso.

Throughout her career she was an advocate for the professionalization of interior decoration throughout various means such as training, experience, and professional organizations. Although not formally schooled in interior decoration, Nancy McClelland believed that her on-the-job training and study of architecture and antiques abroad, along with her experience, made her a professional. And she may have helped to write AID's 1931 definition of an interior decorator: "A decorator is one who, by training and experience, is qualified to plan, design and execute structural interiors and their furnishings, and to supervise the various arts and crafts essential to their completion."

Throughout her long career, she wrote and lectured about the necessity of training for decorators, which helped to separate professionals from the amateurs. In 1922, Harold Eberlein and she published a correspondence course calledThe Arts and Decoration Practical Home Study Course in Interior Decoration for both home and professional decorators. By the 1930s, she advocated a college education and, later, worked with AID to develop a four-year university curriculum that was "equivalent in scope to the comprehensive course in architecture" offered in universities.

== Early life ==
McClelland was born in a middle-class family of Methodist ministers in Poughkeepsie, New York in 1877. In 1897, she received a Bachelor of Arts in Latin and English from Vassar College in Poughkeepsie. While at Vassar, she was an editor of the yearbook, The Vassarion, served as her senior class's poet, and frequently published her poetry for the school newspaper, The Miscellany News. She was a member of Phi Beta Kappa. She was multilingual and spoke French, Italian, German, and Spanish.

== Career ==
During her senior year at Vassar, she was offered a position as a Latin teacher at a girls' school. McClelland turned down the role, as she could not see herself as a teacher. McClelland first started her career as a reporter of stories of women's interests, schools, and clubs for the Philadelphia Press from 1897 to 1900.

=== Au Quatrième and Wanamakers ===
From 1901 to 1907, McClelland worked in the advertising department of Wanamaker's Department Store, where she also had an opportunity to create window displays and store exhibits. She thus commenced her study on what she called "proper and effective arrangement." From there, she traveled to Paris as a 'representative and buyer' for Wanamaker's. While in Paris, she studied art and art history, and visited places, such as chateaux and museums. She also began to study and collect wallpaper and antiques. During her stay, she met the leading French artist of the 20th century Pablo Picasso and also literary innovator and pioneer of Modernist literature Gertrude Stein.

In 1913, McClelland returned to the US and opened Au Quartrième on the fourth floor of Wanamaker's in New York, a shop that sold mostly European antiques. The first of its kind in a department store, it also held several sales of important American antiques too. McClelland served as head buyer for the department and supervised three buyers beneath her. Continuing to go abroad for shopping trips up to three times a year, McClelland brought back decorative furnishings of all types, including an old English Tudor house.

=== Nancy McClelland, Inc. and Interior Design ===
In 1922, she left Wanamaker's and opened her own store, Nancy McClelland Inc. in New York City. The firm specialized in formal period-style interiors in 18th-century French styles in addition to English Regency, English Georgian, and American Colonial. McClelland employed apprentices at her firm, including Mary Dunn, Inez Croom, and Michael Greer. Dunn later took over the business when McClelland retired. Croom went on to become a wallpaper expert in her own right.

McClelland's interior decorating style has been described as “rather correct and formal”. The colonial revival movement was in full effect in the 1920s and many of her interiors reflect this. The firm decorated interiors not only for private homes but also for public institutions such as McClelland's alma mater Vassar College.

Ever an advocate for professionalism, McCelland was a member of the Decorator's Club and was one of the first woman decorators to join the Architectural League once it opened its membership to women in 1934. She was also a founding member of the American Institute of Interior Decorators (A.I.I.D.), which changed its name to American Institute of Decorators (A.I.D.) in 1936. In 1941, McClelland was elected as fifth, and first woman, president of A.I.D. She served from 1941 to 1944. During her tenure as president of A.I.D. the organization admitted students for the first time.

=== Wallpaper ===
In 1924, she published her first book, Historic Wallpapers: From Their Inception to the Introduction of Machinery. A definitive study in its day, it remains an important source of information for wallpapers. Historic Wallpapers covers the history of early block-printed papers and reviews wallpaper designers, manufacturers, and dealers. Special attention is made to scenic wallpapers and some of their owners. During her travels through Europe, McClelland searched for historic wallpapers to bring back to America and visited important sites such as the German Wallpaper Museum, now part of the Museumslandschaft Hessen Kassel.

McClelland believed wallpapers were the most useful backdrop when furnishing a room. In addition to selling antique wallpaper, McClelland also sold reproductions under her firm's name. McClelland's reproductions show her meticulous attention to detail. She even went so far as to have her wallpapers woodblock printed in France on joined sheets of paper, as they would have been in the eighteenth century. In addition to being sold in their New York City showroom, Nancy McClelland, Inc. wallpapers could be found at George J. Brewing in Boston, and The Chintz Shop in Philadelphia, Cincinnati, St. Louis, and Kansas City.

In 1926, McClelland published The Practical Book of Decorative Wall-Treatments.

=== Historic preservation ===
McClelland also worked with such clients as Henry Francis DuPont, John D. Rockefeller, and Electra Havemeyer Webb. he was responsible for finding the infamous Chinese wallpaper now in the Chinese Parlor at the Winterthur Museum In addition, she restored and/or decorated various houses and museums, such as Mount Vernon, the plantation home of George Washington in Virginia, and the Henry Wadsworth Longfellow House in Portland, Maine, the Morris- Jumel Mansion in New York, Brompton Hall, now part of the University of Mary Washington, Blair House in Washington, D.C., and Stanton Hall in Natchez, Mississippi.

McClelland continued to show her devotion to the arts and preservation. She gave lectures at the Metropolitan Museum of Art, helped with the WPA Index of American Design, and has served on committees for the 1939 New York World's Fair.

She also wrote Duncan Phyfe & The English Regency (1939), which examined the work of the famous cabinet maker Duncan Phyfe. She believed the Regency period to be the most "polished", most "animated", and most "corrupt" era for the English society. Her other books were Furnishing the Colonial and Federal House (1936), and The Young Decorators (1928). Inspired by her nieces and nephews, McClelland used them as characters for an early book about decorating for children. She also wrote numerous articles for magazines, including Collier's, Country Life, House Beautiful, and House and Garden.

== Honors ==
McClelland received several rewards, including the French Chevalier of the Legion of Honour in 1930, and the first annual Justin Allman Wallpaper Award was granted to her in 1946 by the National Wallpaper Wholesaler's Association. She was awarded with the Michael Friedsam Medal of the Architectural League of New York for service to the cause of the industrial arts.

== Legacy ==
Nancy Vincent McClelland died on October 1, 1959, at the age of 82. In memory of her and her work, her firm established a scholarship fund for A.I.D.

According to the Quote Investigator website and urban legend researcher Bonnie Taylor-Blake, McClelland wrote an article titled A Mystery of the Paris Exposition in The Philadelphia Inquirer of November 14, 1897, that eventually evolved into the Vanishing Hotel Room urban legend.

== Books ==
- Historic Wallpapers: From Their Inception to the Introduction of Machinery (Lippincott, 1924)
- The Practical Book of Decorative Wall Treatments (Lippincott, 1926)
- The Young Decorators (Harpers, 1928)
- Duncan Phyfe and the English Regency (William Scott, 1939)
- Furnishing the Federal and Colonial House (Lippincott, re-edited in 1947)
