= Od Warszawy do Ojcowa =

1897 novel by Władysław Umiński

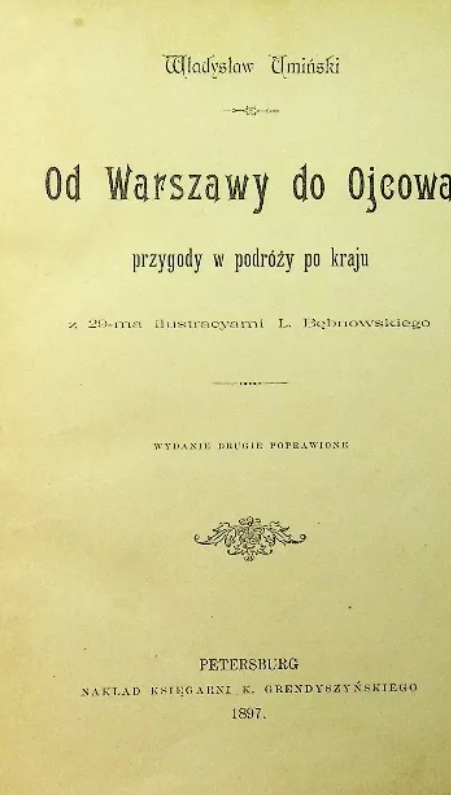
- Title page of the first edition
- Author: Władysław Umiński
- Language: Polish
- Genre: Adventure fiction
- Publication date: 1897
- Media type: Print

Od Warszawy do Ojcowa. Przygody w podróży po kraju (From Warsaw to Ojców: Adventures on a Journey Through the Country) is an adventure travel novel for young readers by Polish author Władysław Umiński, published in 1897. The plot of the novel follows a summer excursion of 4th-grade students from a Warsaw high school, traveling from Warsaw to the southern Polish village of Ojców.

== Publication history ==
The novel was first published in 1897 (by the Polish Bookstore of Kazimierz Grendyszyński in St. Petersburg) and reissued in 1923 and 1925.

== Plot ==
The story centers around a summer trip taken by four 4th-grade students from a Warsaw high school (Ilski, Dębski, Zielnicki, and Motylski). They travel on foot over several weeks, visiting places such as Wilanów, Czersk, Puławy, Kazimierz Dolny, Janowiec, Zwoleń, Czarnolas, Iłża, the Świętokrzyskie Mountains, Chęciny, Kielce, Olkusz, and finally Ojców. Along the way, they explore historical landmarks, collect "natural specimens", and experience various adventures (one of them falls into a dungeon, they are accused of theft, and are robbed by some Romani people). The boys set out on their journey without their parents' permission, though two fathers secretly followed and helped them out of trouble.

== Analysis ==
The novel is considered a work of travel literature and, like many of Umiński's novels, is inspired by the works of Jules Verne, though "transposed to Polish sensibilities and conditions [and] infused with Polish ideals". It reflects the educational values of the positivist era, as well as patriotic themes (a "spirit-lifting" depiction of Poland during the partitions). According to Damian Włodzimierz Makuch, it was a "highly regarded novel in its time".

== Reception ==
In 1896, Wiktor Gomulicki positively reviewed the book in Kraj magazine, praising the setting in Poland and writing that the adventures of the characters would "occupy our youth more than the English and Americans engaging in distant seas and lands". In 1897, a reviewer from Ateneum, signing as J.A., described it as a "vividly written novel that will certainly engage every young reader, who will find in it many interesting details about geography and natural sciences, as well as an introduction to the curiosities, landmarks, people, and nature of their own country". That same year, the book also received a positive review in Przegląd Polski. The reviewer noted that young readers would "rightly be delighted by the adventures of their peers" in this "beautiful" and "exceptionally colorful and engagingly written" book, also praising the "interesting descriptions of places, events, and travel impressions, excellently captured and repeated".

The book's reissues in the interwar period received mixed reviews. In 1924, Aniela Gruszecka criticized the recent edition of the book in Przegląd Warszawski as a "wonderful anachronism", faulting it as outdated since nearly 30 years had passed since it was first published, noting that it includes scant references to contemporary times while generally presenting an antiquated view of the partition era, without mentioning the recent World War I or the end of the partitions. Gruszecka also criticized the low level of knowledge and skills of the characters, who did not know terms she considered common for children of their age (e.g., Beskids, lynx) or skills of the scouting era (e.g., starting a fire, setting up a camp), which, in her view, made the characters seem "laughable and disregarded" to modern readers.

A 1926 reviewer for Dziennik Bydgoski wrote positively about the book, stating that it "provides an exceptionally interesting read during the holidays ... Dear Reader, I know that after reading this work, you will thank me for bringing this beautiful book to your attention". The book was also reviewed by the Book Review Commission for School Youth Reading. The reviewer noted that the novel aimed to introduce readers to interesting Polish locations along with natural science information, but "the author only partially achieves this goal, as the detailed descriptions of architectural landmarks are dry and unengaging". The reviewer also criticized the unclear illustrations in the text. The book was deemed suitable in 1929 for children aged from 11 to 14 years old.

In 1955, Poradnik Bibliotekarza wrote that the book "arouses an interest in travel". In 1983, Jarosław Iwaszkiewicz wrote positively about the book in his memoirs; his 1953 novel, Wycieczka do Sandomierza (Trip to Sandomierz), references Umiński's novel, both in terms of plot and construction, even repeating the name of one of Umiński's characters (Jacek Motylski). It is also dedicated to Umiński "on the 70th anniversary of his unforgettable work".

In 2006, the book was recognized as one of Umiński's more popular works.
