= Josephine Bell =

English mystery writer (1897–1987)

- Born: Doris Collier; 8 December 1897; Manchester, England
- Died: 24 April 1987 (aged 89); England
- Spouse: Norman Ball (m. 1923; died 1935)
- Children: 4

Josephine Bell, pseudonym of Doris Bell Collier, (8 December 1897 – 24 April 1987), was an English physician and writer. Bell wrote nineteen novels and forty-five mystery novels in her lifetime, as well as radio plays, short stories, and series for women's magazines.

== Life ==
Bell was born in Manchester, England in 1897 and studied at Godolphin School between 1910 and 1916. She then trained at Newnham College, Cambridge until 1919. At the University College Hospital in London she was granted M.R.C.S. and L.R.C.P. in 1922, and a M.B. B.S. in 1924.

In 1923, she married Dr. Norman Dyer Ball, and the couple had a son and three daughters. From 1927 until 1935 the couple practiced medicine in Greenwich and London. When her husband died, Bell moved to Guildford, Surrey. From 1954 through 1962 she was a member of the management committee of St. Luke's Hospital.

Bell began to write detective novels beginning in 1936 under her pen name. Many of her works used a medical background and featured the fictional character Dr. David Wintringham, who worked at Research Hospital in London as a junior assistant physician.

In 1953, Bell helped found the Crime Writers' Association and served as chair from 1959 to 1960.

== Bibliography ==
=== David Wintringham ===
- Murder in Hospital, 1937
- Death on the Borough Council, 1937
- Fall Over Cliff, 1938
- Death at Half-Term, 1939
- From Natural Causes, 1939
- All Is Vanity, 1940
- Death at the Medical Board, 1944
- Death in Clairvoyance, 1949
- The Summer School Mystery, 1950
- Bones in the Barrow, 1953
- The China Roundabout, 1956
- The Seeing Eye, 1958

=== Other crime novels ===
- The Port of London Murders, 1938.
- Trouble at Wrekin Farm, 1942.
- Backing Winds, 1951. Serialised: Woman, as 'The Dark Tide' from 21 July to 18 August 1951
- To Let, Furnished, 1952.
- Fires at Fairlawn, 1954.
- Death in Retirement, 1956.
- Double Doom, 1957.
- Easy Prey, 1959.
- The House Above the River, 1959.
- A Well-Known Face, 1960.
- New People at the Hollies, 1961.
- Adventure with Crime, 1962.
- A Flat Tyre in Fulham, 1963.
- The Hunter and the Trapped, 1963.
- The Alien, 1964.
- The Upfold Witch, 1964. Serialised: Woman's Realm from 15 August to 26 September 1964
- No Escape, 1965.
- The Catalyst, 1966.
- Death on the Reserve, 1966.
- Death of a Con Man, 1968.
- The Fennister Affair, 1969.
- The Wilberforce Legacy, 1969.
- A Hydra with Six Heads, 1970.
- A Hole in the Ground, 1971.
- Death of a Poison-Tongue, 1972.
- A Pigeon Among the Cats, 1974.
- Victim, 1975.
- The Trouble in Hunter Ward, 1976.
- Such a Nice Client, 1977.
- A Swan-Song Betrayed, 1978.
- Wolf! Wolf!, 1979.
- A Question of Inheritance, 1980.
- The Innocent, 1983.
