= Balonem do bieguna =

1892 novel for youth by Władysław Umiński

Balonem do bieguna (lit. By Balloon to the Pole; with subtitle Przygody z podróży powietrznej ponad lodami, lit. Adventures in Air Travel over the Ice, in later editions changed to Ponad lodami Antarktydy, lit. Over the Ice of Antarctica) is the second adventure novel for youth by Polish writer Władysław Umiński. It was first published in 1892 serialized in a magazine; it received a book edition in 1894. The novel has been subsequently reprinted several times and translated into French and Russian. The novel tells the story of an expedition to the South Pole using a technologically advanced balloon.

It was the second novel by Umiński, who, after its publication, began to gain fame in Poland as the author of popular novels for youth. It was also Umiński's first novel containing a futuristic gadget (here, airship), and it is considered one of the first Polish science fiction novels.

== Release history ==
The novel was first published in the illustrated magazine Wieczory Rodzinne in 1892 in installments (no. 1–30), and then published as a book in 1894 by Gebethner i Wolff. Over the next several decades, the book had received around ten editions, including in the years 1905, 1925, 1929, 1930, 1947, 1948, 1954, and finally, in 1955. The novel was also translated into French (Au Pole Sud en Balloon) and Russian.

== Plot ==
The plot of the novel concerns, as the title suggests, a journey to the South Pole using a balloon (actually an airship). This device, filled with helium, was capable of travelling against the wind and reaching speeds of up to 150 km/h. It was the work of Polish engineers (Gromski and Jelski) and named "Polonia". Three travelers (Gromski and two Americans, captain Ford and sailor Barton) use it to reach the Pole. During the return journey, they have to face the breakdown of their vehicle, but after numerous adventures, they are saved by a whaling ship.

== Reception ==
In 1926, a reviewer for Dziennik Bydgoski spoke positively about the book, writing: "The reader travels in spirit with the brave pilots, experiences many hardships and dangers with them, admires the magical beauty of the aerial skies, about the wonders of which people on earth have not the slightest idea. I hope that among the readers of this book there will arise a large number of true "Gromskis" who would glorify the name of Poland with their inventions and discoveries!".

== Analysis ==
It was Umiński's second novel, and the first containing a futuristic gadget (described by Polish literary scholar Antoni Smuszkiewicz as "a new type of aerostat, operating on the principle of connecting a balloon with a prototype airplane"), and thus it is Umiński's first science fiction novel and at the same time one of the first Polish books of this genre. The novel, written during the period of partitions of Poland, contains patriotic accents (the heroes are Poles, and it is named "Polonia"). In keeping with Umiński's habits (described by Smuszkiewicz as "timidly looking into the not too distant future"), the inventions presented in the novel are relatively realistic, representing technology only slightly beyond the state of then-current knowledge (the vehicle described by Umiński was built a few years later, in 1900, by a German constructor, Ferdinand von Zeppelin, and filling balloons with safer helium began to be common several years later).

Because of its second part, where the heroes' vehicle suffers an accident on the way back, the novel is classified as a robinsonade. Like many of Umiński's works, it is seen as inspired by Jules Verne, here, his Five Weeks in a Balloon. After the publication of this novel, Umiński began to gain fame in Poland as the author of popular novels for youth.
