= Władysław Umiński =

Polish writer (1865–1954)

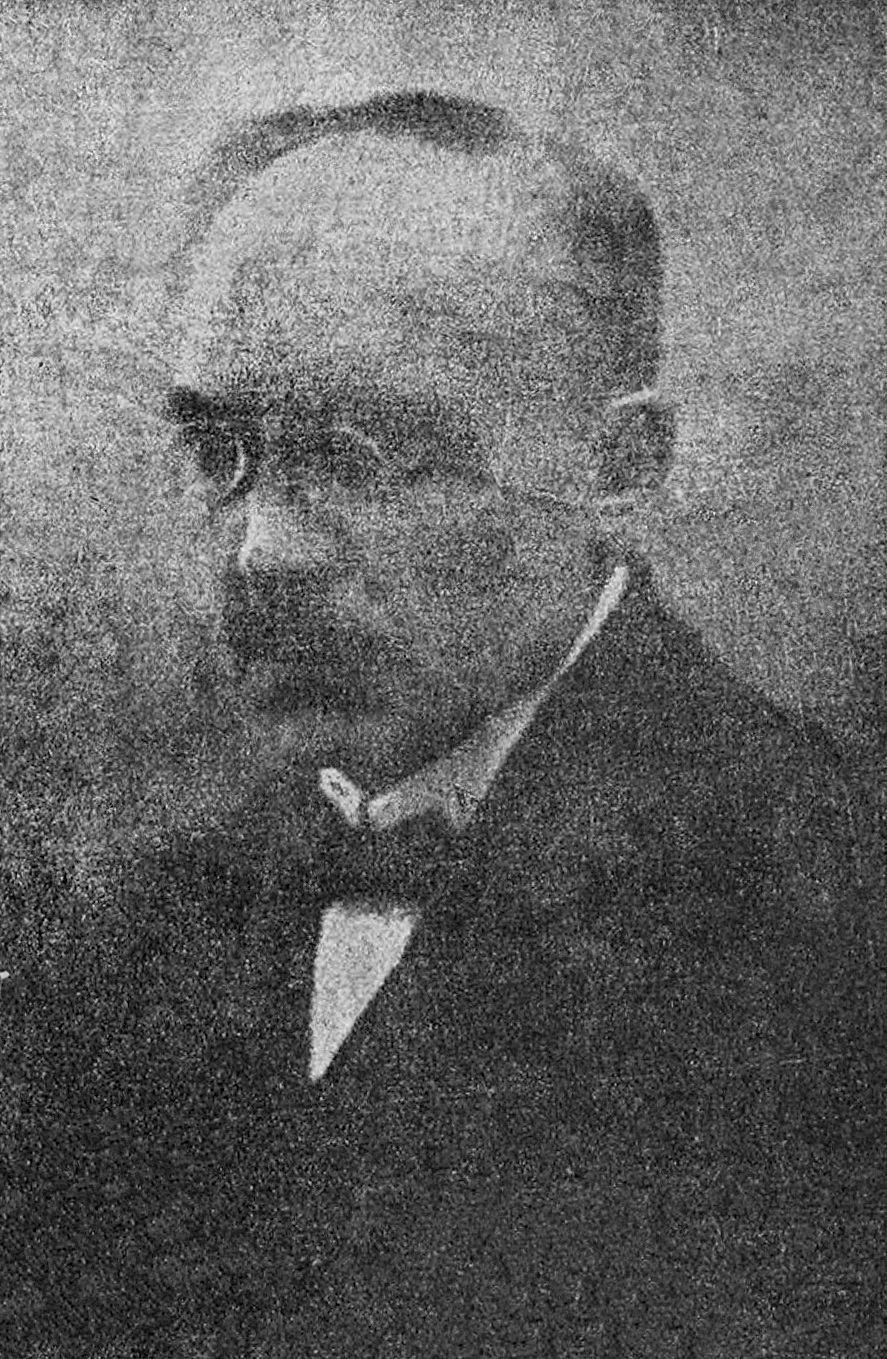
- Umiński in 1922
- Born: Władysław Jan Umiński; 10 November 1865; Przedecz, Congress Poland, Russian Empire
- Died: 31 December 1954 (aged 89); Warsaw, Poland
- Resting place: Powązki Cemetery
- Education: Saint Petersburg University
- Occupation: Writer
- Spouse: Anna Natalia Bejn
- Children: 1
- Writing career
- Language: Polish
- Period: Polish positivism
- Genre: Science fiction
- Notable work: Zaziemskie światy
- Notable awards: Officer's Cross of the Order of Polonia Restituta

Władysław Jan Umiński (10 November 1865 – 31 December 1954) was a Polish journalist, fiction author, and science educator. An early science-fiction writer, he has been dubbed "the Polish Jules Verne" and recognized as a pioneer of Polish science fiction and adventure literature.

He authored around thirty novels and numerous popular science articles, blending scientific exploration with adventure narratives aimed at educating young readers, which is why much of his fiction is classed as young-adult literature. His writings also featured themes of exploration and adventure, emphasized technological innovation, patriotism, and moral progress, frequently featured Polish protagonists and advocated for Polish independence.

Umiński’s novels popularized concepts like aviation and space exploration in Polish literature, while his journalism spanned science, education, and literary criticism. Despite waning popularity posthumously, his contributions to Polish literature and education earned him accolades, including the Officer's Cross of the Order of Polonia Restituta in 1952.

== Life ==
Władysław Umiński was born 10 November 1865, in the Russian partition of Poland, at the village of Przedecz, in an impoverished intelligentsia family. His father, Julian Umiński, was a painter; his mother, Tekla, a teacher. He had three siblings. In 1874 the family moved to Warsaw, where he attended gymnasium and real school. At 15 he wrote his first fiction, the short story "Z Korsyki" ("From Corsica"), and published it in the magazine Przyjaciel Dzieci (The Children's Friend). (Note: However, Krystyna Kuliczkowska writing in 1973 noted that she was unable to find such a short story in the archives of the Przyjaciel Dzieci, suggesting that the story may be anecdotal, or that Umiński made some error when describing this part of his life.)

After obligatory service in the Imperial Russian Army (as a sapper), he studied in the Department of Natural Sciences at Saint Petersburg University. In Saint Petersburg he organized a Polish-language library for local Poles. In the late 1880s he returned to Warsaw and worked for an artesian-well company, cataloged books at the Warsaw University of Technology library, and gave guest lectures on topics in the natural sciences and technology. He also participated in underground education.

From 1888, for some two decades, he contributed to — sometimes edited or published — various periodicals. He wrote science columns such as "Chemistry", "The scientific movement", "Pure and applied science", "The scientist's workshop", and "Science Chronicles". Periodicals that he worked with included Czytelnia dla wszystkich (The Universal Library, 1903–05, which he edited and published in 1904), Dziennik Kijowski (editor, after 1905), Dziennik Wileński, Gazeta Warszawska (1898–1901), Gazeta Wileńska (editor, 1905), Kurier Codzienny (1897–1904), Kurier Warszawski (1888–1923; which likely was where his first popular science article was published – about cattle), Miesiąc Ilustrowany (1912–1913/14, editor and publisher), Nowa Gazeta (1906–1915), Ogrodnik (editor, 1898), Pielgrzym, Prawda (1894–1910), Przyjaciel Młodzieży (c. mid-1910s) Rolnik i Hodowca, Tygodnik Illustrowany (1896–1899), Tygodnik Mód i Powieści (1895–1914), Wędrowiec (1888–1900) and Wieczory Rodzinne (1909–1912, editor and publisher). After World War I he reduced his journalistic activities, although in 1933 he wrote some content for the aviation magazine Lot Polski.

In 1891 he published his first novel Zwycięzcy oceanu (Conquerors of the Ocean), which received a number of editions since (as well as a translation to Czech). In 1894 he published his second novel, and the first featuring a (slightly) futuristic gadget, and thus classified as his first science fiction novel (Balonem do bieguna (Balloon To The Pole); featuring a balloon-airplane hybrid). He would go to publish many more novels over the coming years, often, several in a single year. Many would be first published in various magazines he was associated with. Many of his books were published by the Gebethner i Wolff publishing house. In addition to fiction, he also wrote books about science; starting with the aviation-themed Żegluga powietrzna. Balony i aerostaty. Lot ptaków. Maszyny latające. Baterya gazowa do celów aeronautyki (1894). That book, like many of his other science books, were also well received. His 1899 Ocean i jego tajemnice was for some time the first and only Polish-language book about oceanic marine biology; likewise, his is Nansen pośród lodów północy. Odczyt ludowy from the same year credited as the first Polish publication related to the research on the polar regions. In 1921 he published a 15 volume set of his collected works in the series Wybór powieści dla młodzieży (Selection of Novels for the Youth). In 1926 he published a novelized version of travel chronicle of Polish scout and explorer, Jerzy Jeliński.

Although he wrote about many science topics, from engineering to biology and environmental sciences (some of his works were even used in teaching curricula in high schools), aviation was arguably his biggest passion. In his youth he constructed models of flying machines and worked in the Museum of Industry and Agriculture, where he met Marie Curie; he also claimed to have invented a military electrocution device, and worked, unsuccessfully, on designed a reciprocating engine for a flying machine. Due to financial difficulties, he could not realize his ideas in reality, which was one of his motivations for literary endeavours. He founded first registered aviation club in Poland (Kółko Awiatyczne), in Warsaw (sources vary with regard to the date: 1895 or 1889). His 1911 novel Samolotem naokoło świata popularized the modern Polish word for the airplane (samolot), which he is also credited with coining.

Throughout his life, he travelled abroad, as he described later in life, often "with next to no money". Before World War I, he travelled to North and South America; after the war, he visited Brasil Turkey, Italy, France and United Kingdom. During the period of Second Polish Republic he lived in Bydgoszcz, later in Warsaw. After Poland regained independence, he worked for several government institututions (Emigration Department in 1918; press representative for the Ministry of Internal Affairs, in 1921, later, Film Office). He was a member of the Professional Association of the Polish Writers (Związek Zawodowy Literatów Polskich, ZZLP). In 1949 he also joined the Polish Writers' Union. During World War II his house was destroyed during the German invasion of Poland. Since then he lived in Milanówek near Warsaw.

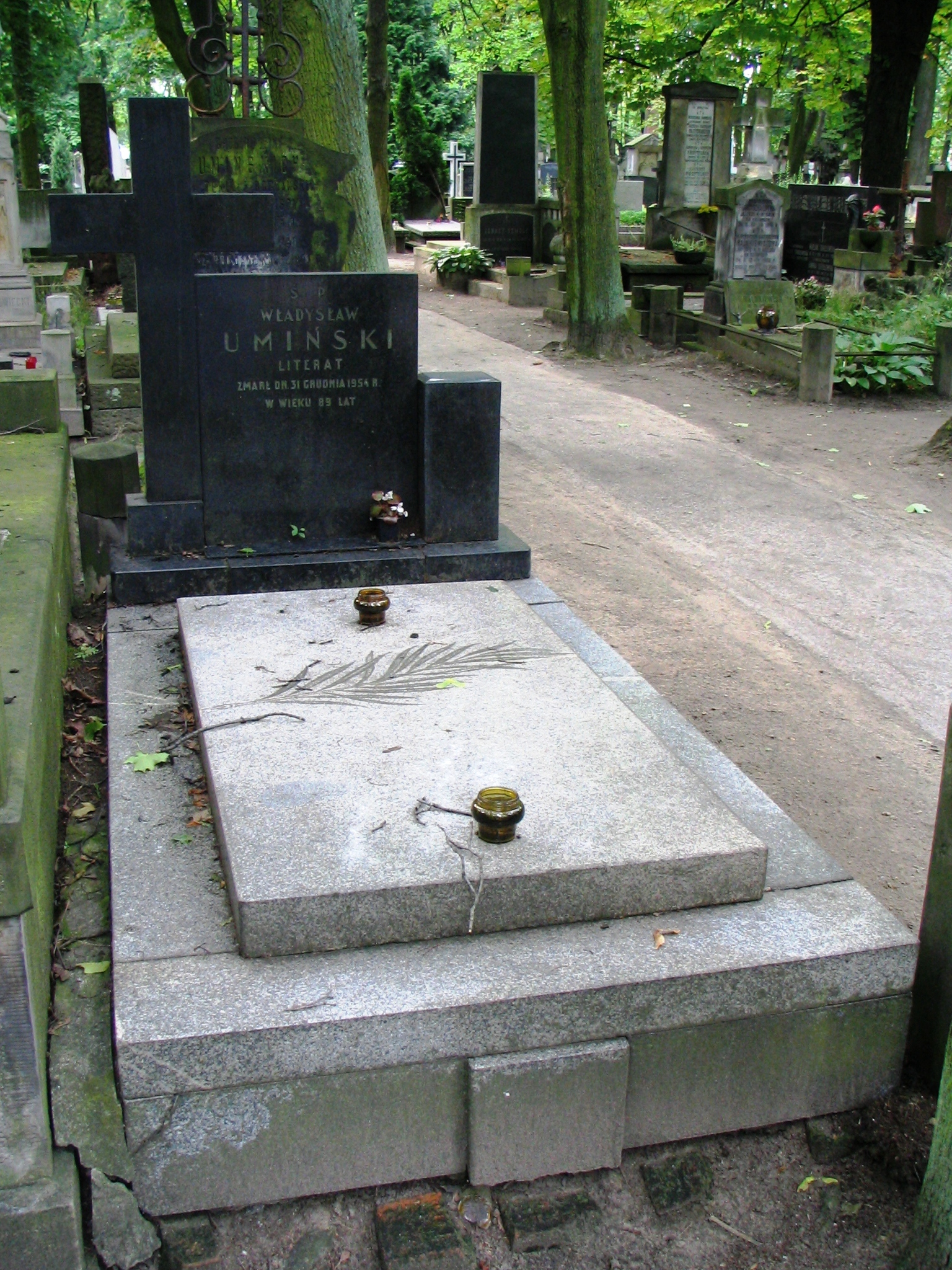
Umiński's grave

In 1952 he was awarded the Officer's Cross of the Order of Polonia Restituta for his lifetime literary achievements. However, around that time he was also in poor financial situation, as the communist regime at that time saw his works as ideologically suspect (he was criticized in particular for favorable portrayal of the United States), and did not support their republication, particularly as Umiński continued to try to get them published through the private Gebethner i Wolff publishing house at the time private enterprises were increasingly discriminated against. Some of his works were temporarily banned by the censorship agency. His final novel, science fiction story Zaziemskie światy (Otherworldly Worlds), finished during wartime, was held by censors who cancelled the initial print in 1948, it was published posthumously in 1956.

Umiński died on 31 December 1954 in Warsaw. He was buried in the Powązki Cemetery. He left an unfinished novel manuscript, Świat za lat tysiąc (The World in a Thousand Years), which was likely inspired by Wells' The Time Machine. Another novel mostly finished near the end of his life, O własnych siłach (about wartime orphans) was never published and are now considered lost; Umiński also had plans for its sequel. A title of another planned novel of him he discussed in interviews in his last years was Zmora świata.

== Analysis ==
His works have featured the themes of science fiction, exploration and adventure, as well as support for Polish independence. He has been called "the founding father of Polish works about exotic travel and adventures". His science fiction motif was tied to his intend to popularize science. Most of his works have been classified as young adult literature.

Polish literary critics and historians of literature, Andrzej Niewiadowski and Antoni Smuszkiewicz noted that protagonists of his stories are almost universally charismatic "brave explores, often scientists and brilliant engineers", who use cutting-edge inventions (planes, submarines, etc.) to "establish contact with another civilization, challenge nature... overcome their own fear, prove the strength and power of man who can overcome all obstacles..." and pave way to a brighter future. The books are optimistic; Niewiadomski and Smuszkiewicz write further that "In the clash with nature, civilization achieves an unquestionable victory", and the characters grow through adversity. A recurring motif in his works is the failure of advanced gadgets, which the protagonists have to fix or improve to show off their skills – a theme related to the education promotion, as well as concepts of organic work and grassroots work, popular in era of the Polish positivism. Because if this, although Umiński wrote most of his science-fiction works during the era of Young Poland, educational character of his works means they are seen as part of the earlier positivist era. It also led to his work being endorsed by the interwar Polish Ministry of Education. His characters also resemble those of Jules Verne, an archetype which Niewiadowski and Smuszkiewicz called Nietzschean Übermensch.

Umiński's work have also been seen as promoting the cause of Polish independence. Many of his works, mostly written during the period of partitions of Poland, feature Polish protagonists, inventions attributed to Polish scientists or entrepreneurs, and expeditions organized and led by Poles. Łukasz Kurdybacha cited Flibustierowie (1898) and Krwawy chleb (1912) as particularly notable in this context.

From modern perspective, his works have been criticized for not delving into societal issues or transformation of future society, and his science fiction ideas have been noted to have been not particularly revolutionary or imaginative, rather, simple extrapolations and improvements of existing technologies (gramophones, submarines, aircraft). On the other hand, Smuszkiewicz noted that this meant the inventions presented in his works were more realistic than those of Verne or Wells, whose ideas Umiński sometimes criticized as too unrealistic. Many of the devices he described in his books have become a reality within a few years of their publication. He has been known to adjust details of his inventions in newer editions to reflect the evolving state of technology. Polish literary scholar Kamila Budrowska suggested that his science fiction themes should be seen more through the prism of his educational activities than experiments with imagination. Nonetheless, some of his works also feature space travel, with protagonists of W nieznane światy (1895) trying to contact Mars, and Zaziemskie światy (1948), visiting Venus. His 1895 novel also anticipates miniature sound-recording devices and explores one of early science fiction's recurring themes, the possibility of communication with extraterrestrial intelligence. Czarodziejski okręt (1916), meanwhile, portrayed an advanced civilian ship featuring a seaplane and long range wireless telegraphy or radio ("metatelephone"). His Krzyż i półksiężyc (1913) and ''Przygody łodzi podwodnej'' (1925) are regarded as some of the earliest examples of Polish military science fiction.

Umiński's positive view of technological progress changes in his late works (Zaziemskie światy) which likely reflect his wartime disappointment at the destructive consequences of said trend. In that work, Umiński promotes not technological, but moral progress. Nonetheless, the novel considerably broadened the science-fictional scope of his fiction by depicting interplanetary travel and extraterrestrial civilizations.

Research on Umiński's work is hampered by the fact that researchers do not have access to the author's archive, which, if it has survived, is probably in the possession of his heirs.

== Reception ==
During his life, he authored about thirty novels and anthologies. He was active in educational activities related to popularizing science, as a writer, translator and publisher; he authored hundreds or perhaps thousands of popular science articles, as well as about forty larger brochures, sometimes classified as books.

Niewiadomski and Smuszkiewicz called him one of the better-known Polish science fiction writers. Nonetheless, while Umiński was popular during his lifetime, he has been described as "forgotten" by modern readers, and Budrowska suggested that he is much better known these days among the scholars (particularly of Polish science fiction and literature) than average readers.

His works were popular during his lifetime and received numerous editions. There is some disagreement concerning whether they have aged well. Already in 1955 a reviewer opined that his works have not aged well and have mostly historical value.A similar view was endorsed 2013 by Damian Makuch, who noted that after Umiński's death his works suffered from lack of updating with regards to current technological developments, while Smuszkiewicz in 1982 noted that reprints of his work purposefully use the first edition version to stress the historical, anachronistic theme. Krystyna Kuliczkowska, writing in the 1970s, noted that among Polish writers of the "older generation", most appreciated were Umiński's local history and travel works, such as Od Warszawy do Ojcowa (1897); while among the general public, the most eagerly read and popular were his "exotic travel and science fiction novels", written according to the pattern of an "adventure novel". In 2015 by a Kamila Budrowska suggested that already the youth of the 1950s did not appreciate Umiński's style. However, Krystyna Jakowska in 2006 noted that "due to good action scenes, some of his works are still published today". Likewise, Niewiadomski and Smuszkiewicz note that despite the increasing obsolescence of the science-fictionish gadgets featured in his works, the stories themselves benefit from "a compact, interestingly constructed plot modeled on the adventurous novels of Thomas Mayne Reid and Robert Louis Stevenson, a simple narrative, and not too obtrusive didacticism, so they are still well-deservedly popular with readers."

He has been recognized as one of the precursors of science fiction literature in Poland and called the "Polish Jules Verne". The comparison to Verne was made as early as 1895 by a reviewer writing for magazine Niwa. Smuszkiewicz did note that despite this comparison, Umiński's works are not as innovative with regards to both science fiction themes and the plot construction as those of Verne's, although he notes that his works had significant value in terms of educating youth about science and patrotism. He has also been compared to Henryk Sienkiewicz with regards to his action scenes.

== Private life ==
He married Anna Natalia Bejn, who died shortly before him in 1951. They had a daughter who died in 1945.

== Selected works ==
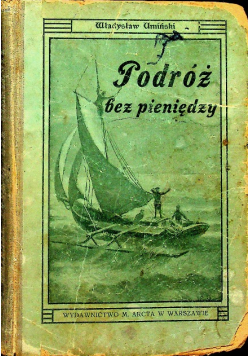
Podróż bez pieniędzy, 1906 edition

The following list contains his fiction, and selective works of non-fiction works. His translations are omitted. (Note: Umiński published several translations, sometimes with edits and modifications, including of works of Friedrich J. Pajeken, Fridtjof Nansen (Farthest North), and Felix von Luckner (Count Luckner, the Sea Devil)) Dates denote book publications; many works debuted a few years earlier in the serialized format.

- Zwycięzcy oceanu (1891, eight editions, and a translation to Czech)
- Balonem do bieguna (1894, five editions and translations to French and Russian)
- Podróż bez pieniędzy (1894, seven editions)
- W nieznane światy (1895; retitled in later editions from 1913 as Na drugą planetę, nine editions, and translations to Hebrew and Russian)
- Wędrowna wyspa (1895, one edition)
- Przygody emigrantów w puszczy brazylijskiej (1895, one edition)
- W kraju ludożerców (1896, two editions)
- W pustyniach Australii. Opisy i przygody w podróży, dla młodzieży (1896, three editions and a translation to Hebrew)
- Od Warszawy do Ojcowa (1897, two editions)
- Z odmętów morskich (1897, one edition)
- Na falach Atlantyku. Przygody rozbitków pośród oceanu (1897, two editions)
- Ocean i jego tajemnice (1899)
- Nansen pośród lodów północy. Odczyt ludowy (1899)
- Na szczytach (1900, two editions)
- Podróż naokoło świata piechotą. T.1: W podobłocznych krainach (1900, three editions)
- Podróż naokoło Warszawy (1901, one edition)
- Tajemnicza bandera i flibustierowie (1901; later editions retitled and split into Tajemnicza bandera and Flibustierowie; eight editions, a translation to Serbo-Croatian and a radio adaptation)
- Biały mandaryn. Przygody rodziny polskiej na dalekim Wschodzie (1903, two editions)
- Człowiek leśny. Opowiadanie podróżnika po Afryce (1903, one edition)
- Wygnańcy (1906, one edition)
- W czarnej otchłani. Kartka z życia górników (1908, one edition)
- Historia biednego chłopca w pięciu częściach świata (a three-volume series composed of Przygody małego Australczyka (1910), W puszczach Kanady (1921) and W krainie wschodzącego słońca (1911); several editions and a translation)
- Samolotem naokoło świata (1911, three editions)
- Krwawy chleb (1912, one edition titled Znojny chleb), eight editions
- Synowie puszczy (1912, three editions)
- Krzyż i półksiężyc. Powieść dla młodzieży na tle ostatniej wojny bałkańskiej (1913, two editions)
- Po kraju (1913, two editions)
- Czarodziejski okręt (1916, three editions)
- Krwawa dola. Powieść z niedalekiej przeszłości (1918, one edition)
- Przygody wojenne (1919, one edition)
- W głębinach oceanu (1920, three editions)
- Przygody łodzi podwodnej i inne opowiadania (1925, one edition)
- Pod flagą polską. Samochodem naokoło świata. Podróż skauta Jerzego Jelińskiego (1926, two editions)
- Zaziemskie światy (1948)
