= Quote Investigator =

Quote origin fact-checking website

Quote Investigator is a website that fact-checks the reported origins of widely circulated quotes. It was started in 2010 by Gregory F. Sullivan, a former Johns Hopkins University computer scientist who runs the site under the pseudonym Garson O'Toole. Many of the quotes that O'Toole examines on the site are emailed to him by readers. In her review of the site for The School Librarian, the Thorp Academy's Beth Khalil concluded, "This site would be a very useful resource for librarians, teachers or students to use when studying a variety of subjects." In April 2017, O'Toole published the results of many of his online quote investigations in the book Hemingway Didn't Say That: The Truth Behind Familiar Quotations.

== See also ==
- Bartlett's Familiar Quotations
- The Yale Book of Quotations
