= Reyhan Angelova =

Bulgarian singer (1986–2005)

Reyhan Рейхан
- Born: Rosica Indzhova Angelova; 23 July 1986; Yambol, Bulgaria
- Died: August 25, 2005 (aged 19) Sofia, Bulgaria
- Genre: Pop-folk
- Occupation: Singer
- Years active: 2001-2005
- Label: Payner

Rositsa Indzhova Angelova (Bulgarian: Росица Инджова Ангелова, 23 July 1986 – 25 August 2005), better known by her stage name Reyhan (Bulgarian: Рейхан), was a Bulgarian pop singer. She is of Roma Gypsy descent who sang in Turkish. She began her career as a singer in Orchestra Kristal and released two albums, followed by a solo album in 2003. Reyhan died after a car accident in 2005.

== Discography ==
- Biz ikimiz esmeris (2001)
- Reĭkhan i ork. Kristal (2002)
- Inan sevgilim (2003) debut solo album
- V pamet na Reĭkhan (2005) posthumous compilation
