= Peter Noikov =

- Born: April 27, 1868; Yambol
- Died: 1921 (aged 52–53)
- Other names: Petar Noikov

Peter Noikov (Bulgarian: Петър Нойков; April 27, 1868 – 1921) was a Bulgarian educator and the first Bulgarian professor in pedagogic.

Noikov was born in Yambol. He worked as a teacher and graduated from a secondary school in Sofia. In 1893 the Ministry of Education sent him to a course in Switzerland. The same year, he enrolled at the University of Leipzig, studying philosophy and pedagogy under Wilhelm Wundt, Friedrich Paulsen, Johannes Volkelt and Carl Stumpf. He made PhD in 1898 (under Volkelt).

He moved to Sofia University to teach, giving a wide range of lectures, as well as founding and running a research laboratory in pedagogy, didactics and child psychology.
