= Faculty of Engineering and Technology Yambol =

Coordinates: 42°28′32″N 26°31′9″E

Faculty of Engineering and Technology - Yambol is a basic unit in the structure of the University of Thrace - Stara Zagora, in Bulgaria.

== History ==
It was founded in 1964 as a branch of a teaching college, focused on training students to teach agriculture. In 1972, it became an independent institute, and in 1974, it added a second focus: automotives. In 1999, it was brought into the University of Thrace as a technical college, and in 2011, it took on its current form as the Faculty of Engineering and Technology with the university.

== Education ==
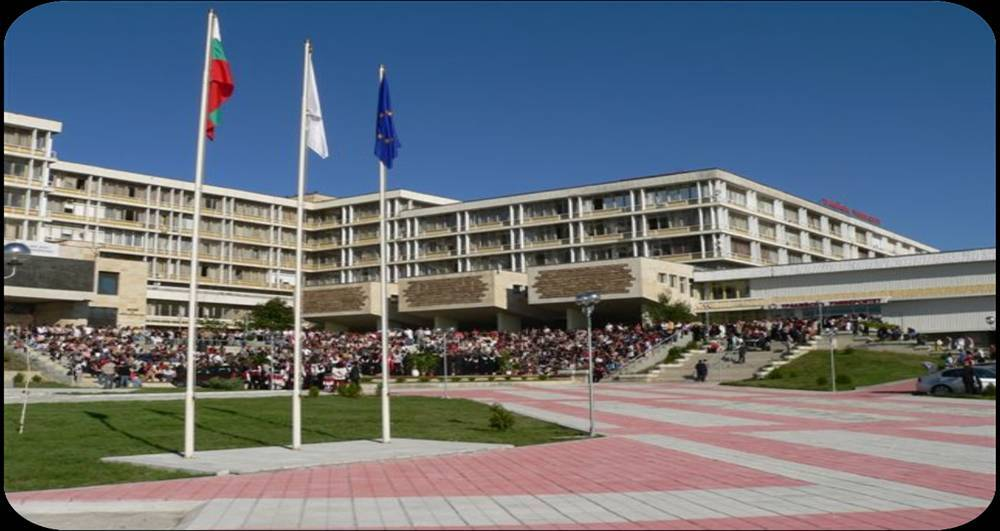
The Faculty of Engineering and Technology is part of Thrace University, pictured above

Student enrollment is 531.

The faculty has a new modern material and technical base, three school buildings, modern furnished rooms and laboratories (26 laboratories), bases for training and work placement (9), student dormitories, library, bookstore, canteen for all students, coffee club.

The library amounted to 23,500 volumes of monographs, reference books and scientific periodicals in the field of technical sciences, food technology, economics, pedagogy, and others.

== Teaching staff ==
7 professors, 26 associate professors, 24 assistants and a senior lecturer. Of these, three are "doctor" and four are "PhD". The "Technique and technology" faculty is funded by the state and teaches on both a regular and part-time basis.

== Research ==
Research in the Faculty "Equipment and Technologies" - Yambol exists in the areas of motor transport and agricultural machinery, fashion design, textile and sewing technology, electrical engineering, electronics and automation, energy, food technology, natural sciences and the humanities. Much of the research is of applied nature and found expression in implementations or consultancy. For example, when an Italian consortium was building the first solar panel factory in Bulgaria, they consulted with the Faculty of Engineering. Faculty have also developed a new antioxidant drink.

== International Activities ==
International activity is associated mainly with Erasmus. Contracts are 14 contracts with technical departments and structural units in universities in Italy, Montenegro, United Kingdom, Germany, Greece, Lithuania, Romania, Slovenia, Turkey and Czech Republic.

Faculty staff is involved in other programs in the EU initiative "Lifelong Learning" as study visits and Gryundvik.

Faculty is involved in the development and implementation of two projects under the programs with partner University of Thrace - Edirne, Turkey.

There are also bilateral agreements for cooperation with universities Ukraine and Georgia - countries not participating in Erasmus.
