= Yambol =

Yambol Ямбол
- Town
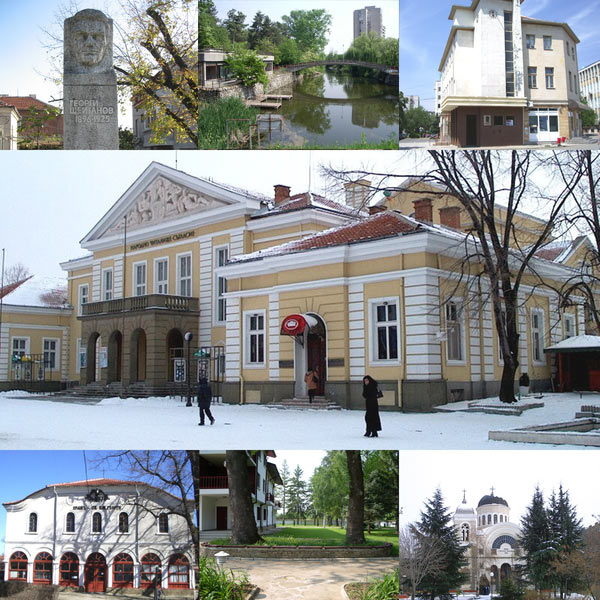
- Top left: Statue of George Sheytanov, Top middle: Tundzha River, Top right: Georgi Rakovski Library in Osvobozhdenie Square, Center: Saglasie Community Hall, Bottom left: Yambol Saint George Orthodox Church, Bottom middle: Ormana Park, Bottom right: Saint Nikolay Church of Yambol

- Flag Coat of arms

- Location of Yambol Yambol (Balkans)
- Coordinates: 42°29′N 26°30′E
- Country: Bulgaria
- Province (Oblast): Yambol

Government
  - Mayor: Valentin Revanski (Direct Democracy)
- Elevation: 114 m (374 ft)

Population (Census 2021)
  - Total: 63,656
- Demonym: Yambolian
- Time zone: UTC+2 (EET)
  - Summer (DST): UTC+3 (EEST)
- Postal Code: 8600
- Area code: 046
- License plate: Y
- Website: www.yambol.bg

Yambol (Bulgarian: Ямбол [ˈjamboɫ]) is a city in Southeastern Bulgaria and administrative centre of Yambol Province. It lies on both banks of the Tundzha river in the historical region of Thrace. It is occasionally spelled Jambol.

Yambol is the administrative center of two municipalities. One is Yambol Municipality, which covers the city itself, and the other is Tundzha Municipality, which covers the rural areas around Yambol.

Historical population
Year	Pop.	±%
1887	11,241	—
1910	15,975	+42.1%
1934	24,920	+56.0%
1946	30,576	+22.7%
1956	42,333	+38.5%
1965	58,465	+38.1%
1975	75,766	+29.6%
1985	90,215	+19.1%
1992	91,497	+1.4%
2001	82,649	−9.7%
2011	74,132	−10.3%
2021	61,766	−16.7%
Source: Censuses

== History ==
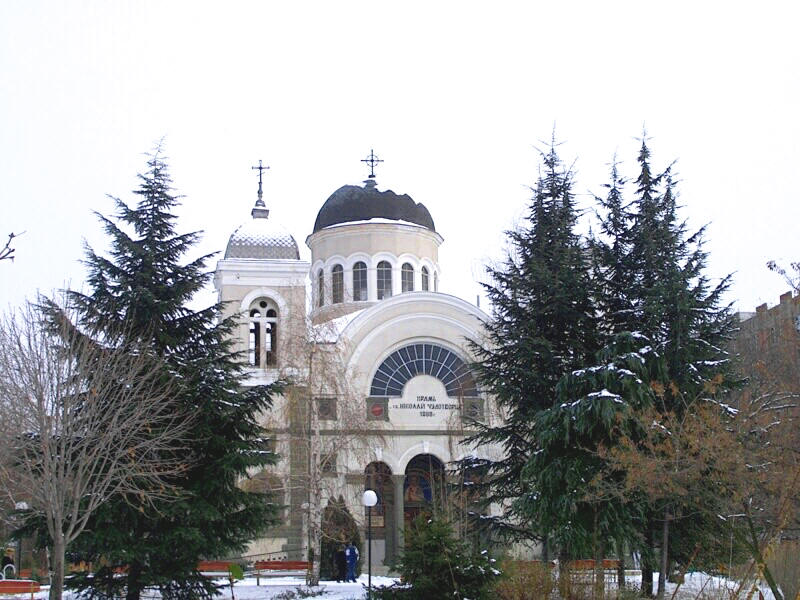
Church of St Nicholas in the winter

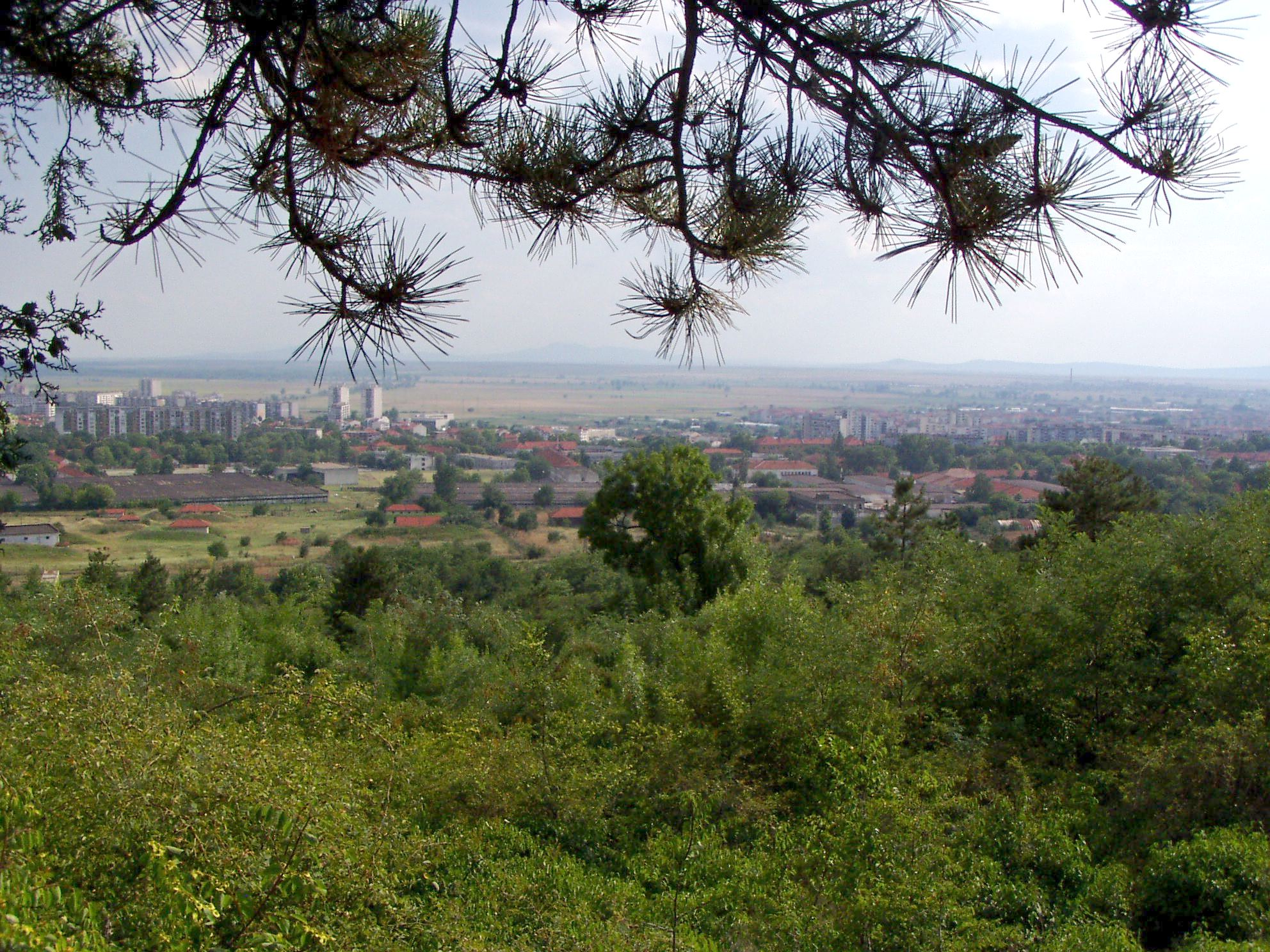
Panoramic view of the city visible from Borovets

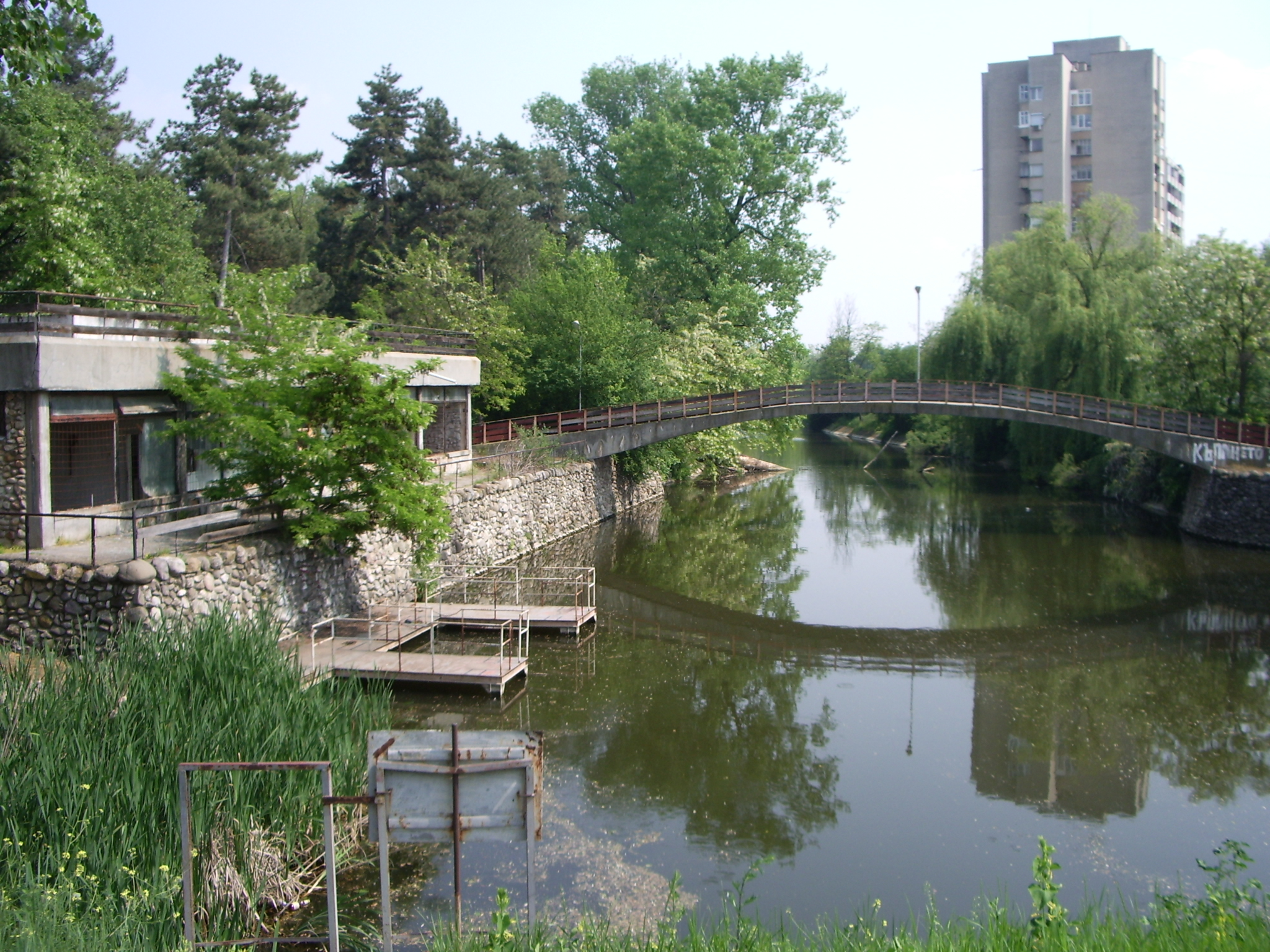
Tundzha River

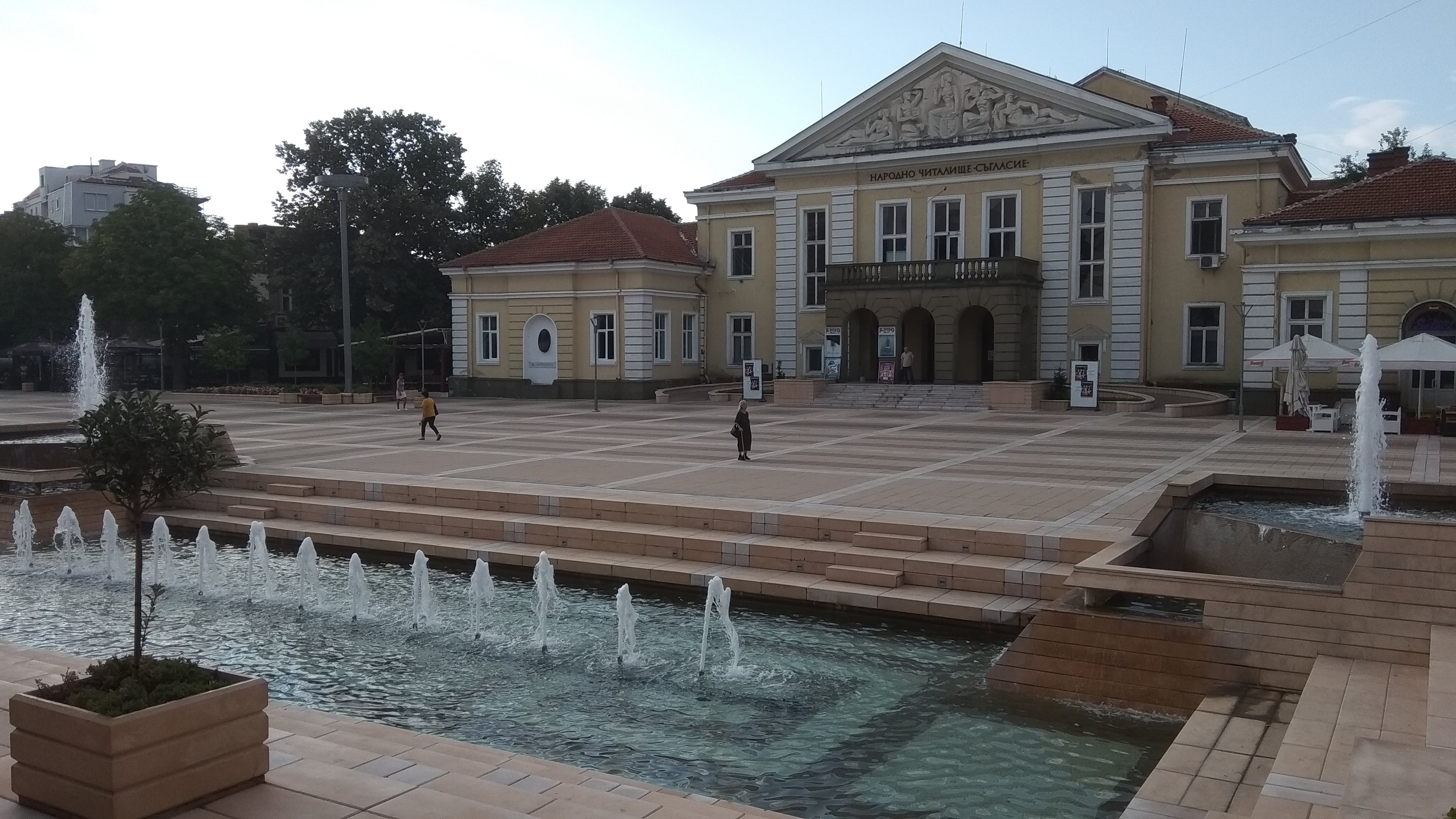
Yambol city center after renovation in 2018

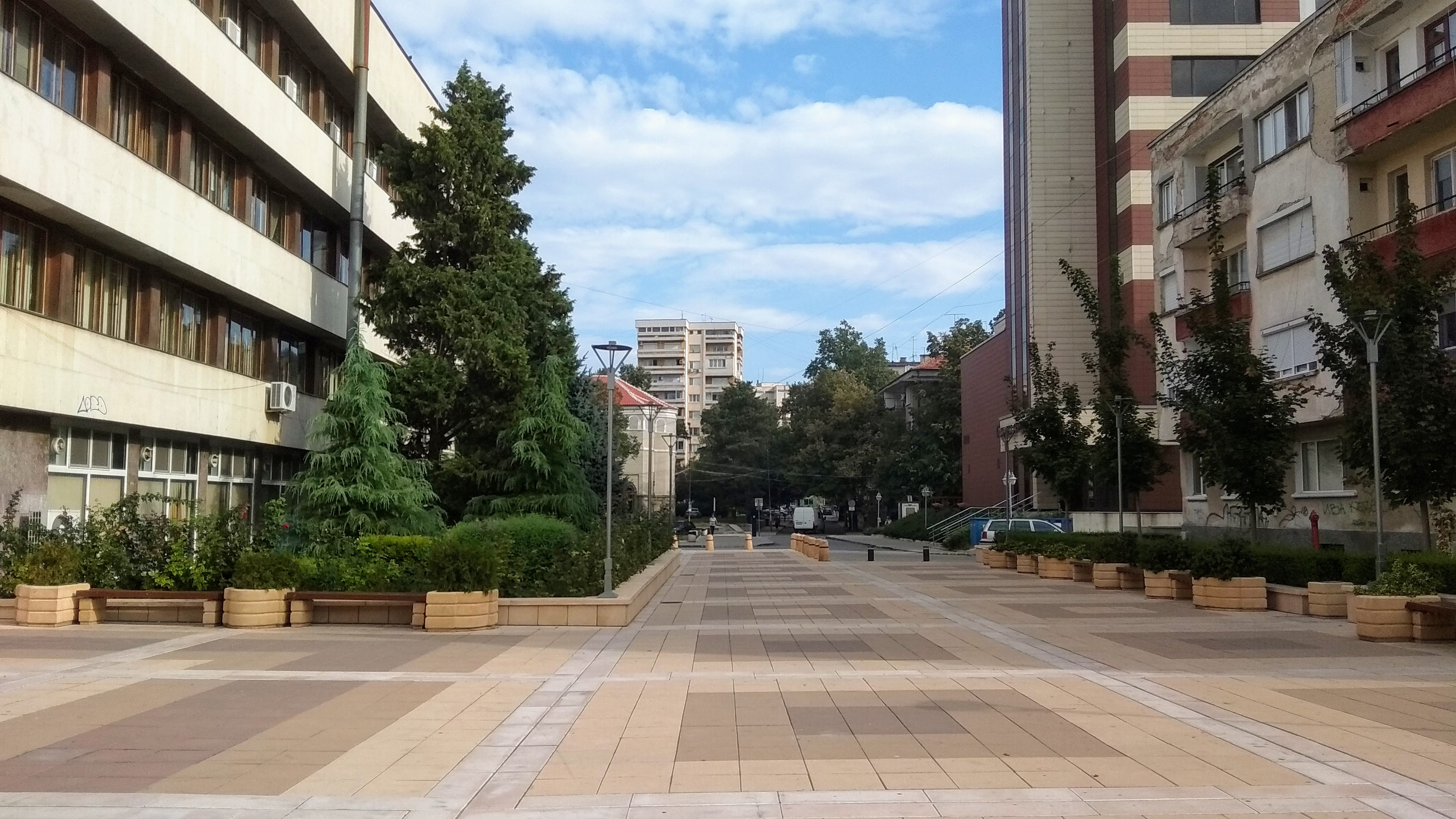
Yambol city center after renovation in 2018

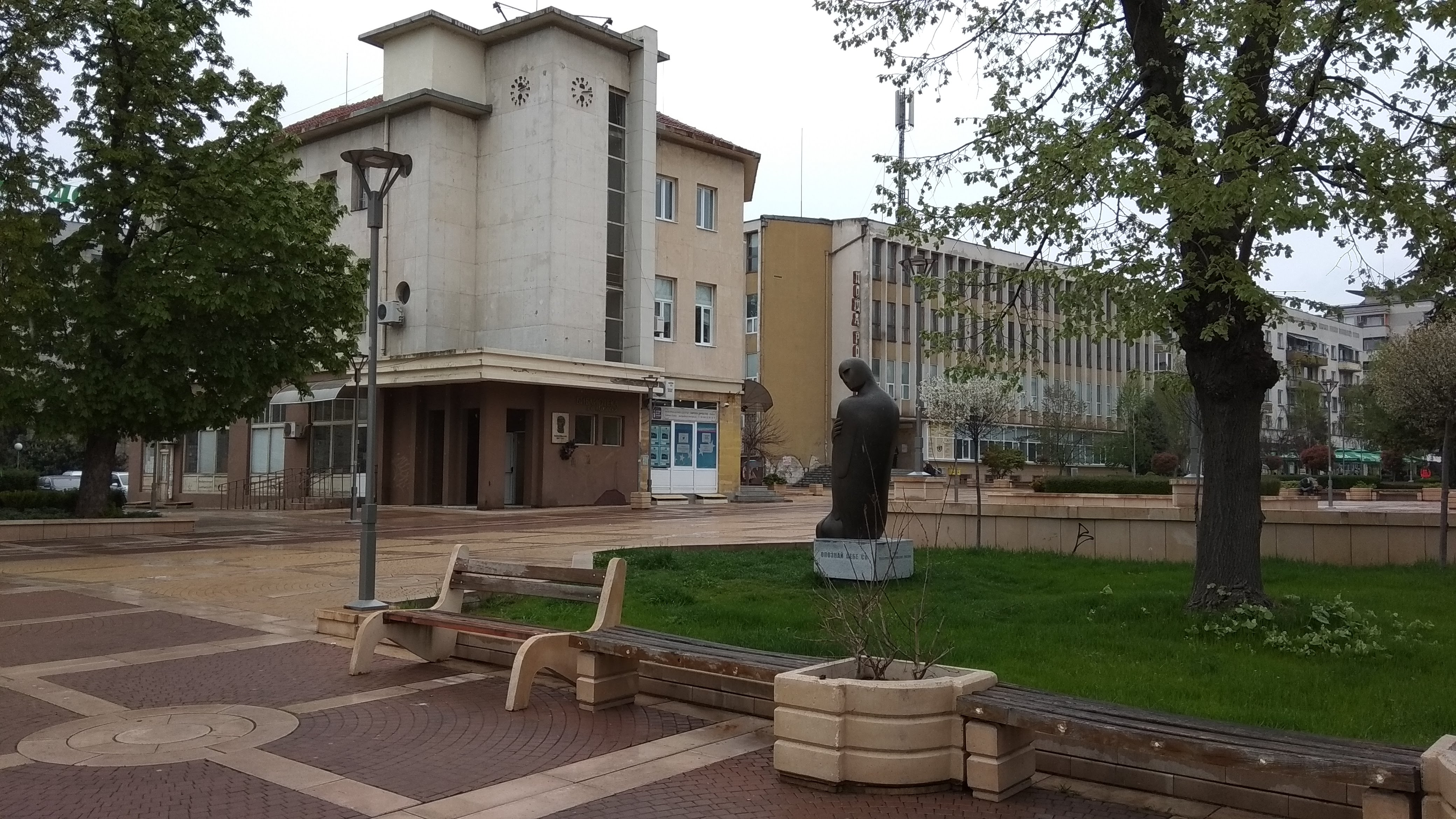
City Library and Central Post Office

The area surrounding Yambol has been inhabited since the Neolithic Era. The ancient Thracian royal city of Kabile or Kabyle (Bulgarian: Кабиле), dating from the end of the 2nd millennium BCE, was located 10 km from current-day Yambol. It was one of Thracians' most important cities and contained one of the kings' palaces. The city was conquered by King Philip II of Macedon in 341 BCE and was re-established as an Ancient Greek polis. After the collapse of Alexander the Great’s empire in the 3rd century BCE, Kabile was ruled by the Thracians once again. It was conquered by the Romans in 71 BCE and later incorporated into the Roman province of Thrace. By 136 CE, Kabile was one of the largest Roman military bases in the region housing at least 600 soldiers. A large residence for military officers has recently been excavated in the archaeological park at Kabile.

Kabile was expanded by Roman Emperor Diocletian in 293 CE. Although it was named Diospolis (Διόςπόλις in Greek 'city of Zeus'), the name also reflected the first syllable of emperor Diocletian's name. The name later evolved through Diampolis (Διάμπόλις), Eiambouli (Ηιάμβόυλι; in Byzantine chronicles), Dinibouli (دنبلي; Arabic chronicles), Dbilin (Дбилин; in Bulgarian inscriptions), and Diamboli or Jamboli (Диамбоюли) to become Yambol. Prior to the 1945 spelling reform, the name was rendered with an additional yer at the end, as Ямболъ.

Kabile was conquered by the Goths in the 4th century CE and was destroyed by the Avars in 583. As the Slavs and Bulgars arrived in the Balkans in the Middle Ages, the Kabile fortress was contested by the First Bulgarian Empire and the Eastern Roman Empire. It ultimately became part of Bulgaria in 705 CE during the reign of Khan Tervel and has been an important Bulgarian center ever since.

The city expanded during the reign of Khan Omurtag of the First Bulgarian Empire, and a new fortress was built. Its proximity to the border made it essential for both trade and military purposes. During the reign of Boris I and Tsar Simeon, the first literary centers were established, mostly as part of the church. Books were imported from Preslav and Ohrid literary schools and were studied in the city's churches.

During the reign of Tsar Kaloyan, the city again increased in importance, mainly due to the ongoing conflict between Bulgaria and the crusaders. A major battle between Tsar Kaloyan and the crusaders happened in 1204 CE, about 80 kilometers south-west of the town, where Bulgaria defeated the crusaders in the battle of Adrianopole on 14 April 1205.

The Ottoman Turks conquered Yambol in 1373 CE, but a militarized, semi-independent Bulgarian population remained as voyinuks in the southern part of the city. It was renamed to "Yanbolu" in Turkish. It was a kaza center of the Ottoman Empire, which was bound successively to Çirmen Sanjak (Its center was Edirne) of Rumelia Eyalet (1364–1420), Silistre Sanjak of Rumelia Eyalet (1420-1593), Silistre Sanjak of Silistre Eyalet (1593–1830), İslimye Sanjak of Edirne Vilayet (1830–1878), and the department of Sliven in Eastern Rumelia before joining the Principality of Bulgaria in 1885.

The predominant religion in Yambol is Eastern Orthodox Christianity. Many local churches were erected in 1888. These include the Holy Trinity church, the St George church, and the St Nicholas cathedral, the largest of them being the St. Nicholas cathedral. Eastern Rite Catholic and Protestant religious buildings also exist in Yambol.

In modern times, Yambol was the center of Yambol Okolia starting in 1878 and then Yambol Okrug starting in 1948. In 1984 it became part of the newly formed Burgas Oblast where it remained for 10 years. Since the early 1990s, Yambol has been the center of Yambol Oblast (or Yambol Municipality).

The city was affected by the turmoils of the early 20th century. Bulgarian refugees from East Thrace, attacked by the Turkish Army in a 1913 ethnic cleansing campaign against Thracian Bulgarians, settled in the city. Yambol's Greek population (around 20 families) left for Greece during that exchange of refugee populations. Yambol also hosted Bulgarian Macedonian refugees from the failed 1903 Ilinden Uprising against the Turkish Empire. During World War I, Yambol hosted a base for Luftstreitkräfte (Imperial German Army Air Service) zeppelins used for missions in Romania, Russia, Sudan and Malta. The city was chosen by the Germans due to its favorable location and weather conditions. During the Balkan Wars, Yambol was the headquarters of the First Bulgarian Army, which played a vital role in the defeat of the Turks in Thrace.

In the early 21st century, the city became the first one in Bulgaria to offer natural gas for residential use.

== Population ==
In the first decade after the liberation of Bulgaria from the Turkish Empire, the population of Yambol exceeded 10,000. In 1887, it was 11,241. Since then, it started growing decade by decade, mostly because of migrants from rural areas and the surrounding smaller towns. Yambol's population reached its peak in the period of 1985–1992, exceeding 90,000. After this peak, the population started decreasing due to the economic situation in Bulgaria during the 1990s, which led to migration to Burgas. As of February 2011, the city had a population of 74,132. The population of Tundzha Municipality, of which the city is the administrative center, was 98,287.

== Economy ==
Local industry has declined since the 1990s with many factories closing down. The city is the centre of its thriving agricultural surroundings.

=== Ethnic, linguistic, and religious composition ===
According to the latest 2011 census data, the individuals declared their ethnic identity were distributed as follows:

- Bulgarians: 59,899 (87.1%)
- Gypsies: 4,263 (6.2%)
- Turks: 3,185 (4.6%)
- Others: 296 (0.4%)
- Indefinable: 1,101 (1.6%)
  - Undeclared: 11,718 (8.5%)

Total: 74,132

== Geography ==
=== Climate ===
The climate in Yambol is moderate with influences from both the Black Sea (from the East) and the Aegean Sea (from the South).

Climate data for Yambol
Month	Jan	Feb	Mar	Apr	May	Jun	Jul	Aug	Sep	Oct	Nov	Dec	Year
Mean daily maximum °C (°F)	6.5 (43.7)	8.7 (47.7)	13.6 (56.5)	18.4 (65.1)	24.1 (75.4)	28.2 (82.8)	31.1 (88.0)	31.2 (88.2)	25.7 (78.3)	19.5 (67.1)	13.7 (56.7)	7.6 (45.7)	19.0 (66.2)
Daily mean °C (°F)	3.3 (37.9)	4.4 (39.9)	8.4 (47.1)	13.0 (55.4)	18.2 (64.8)	22.5 (72.5)	25.2 (77.4)	25.0 (77.0)	20.3 (68.5)	15.0 (59.0)	9.6 (49.3)	4.1 (39.4)	14.1 (57.4)
Mean daily minimum °C (°F)	0.0 (32.0)	0.2 (32.4)	3.6 (38.5)	7.8 (46.0)	12.5 (54.5)	16.8 (62.2)	19.3 (66.7)	19.2 (66.6)	14.8 (58.6)	10.3 (50.5)	5.5 (41.9)	0.7 (33.3)	9.1 (48.4)
Average precipitation mm (inches)	45.5 (1.79)	41.6 (1.64)	32.8 (1.29)	34.3 (1.35)	59.8 (2.35)	50.7 (2.00)	50.9 (2.00)	40.7 (1.60)	70.3 (2.77)	49.7 (1.96)	34.6 (1.36)	58.9 (2.32)	569.7 (22.43)
Mean monthly sunshine hours	106	132	181	203	274	303	339	329	242	181	133	101	2,525
Source: weatheronline.co.uk

== Culture ==
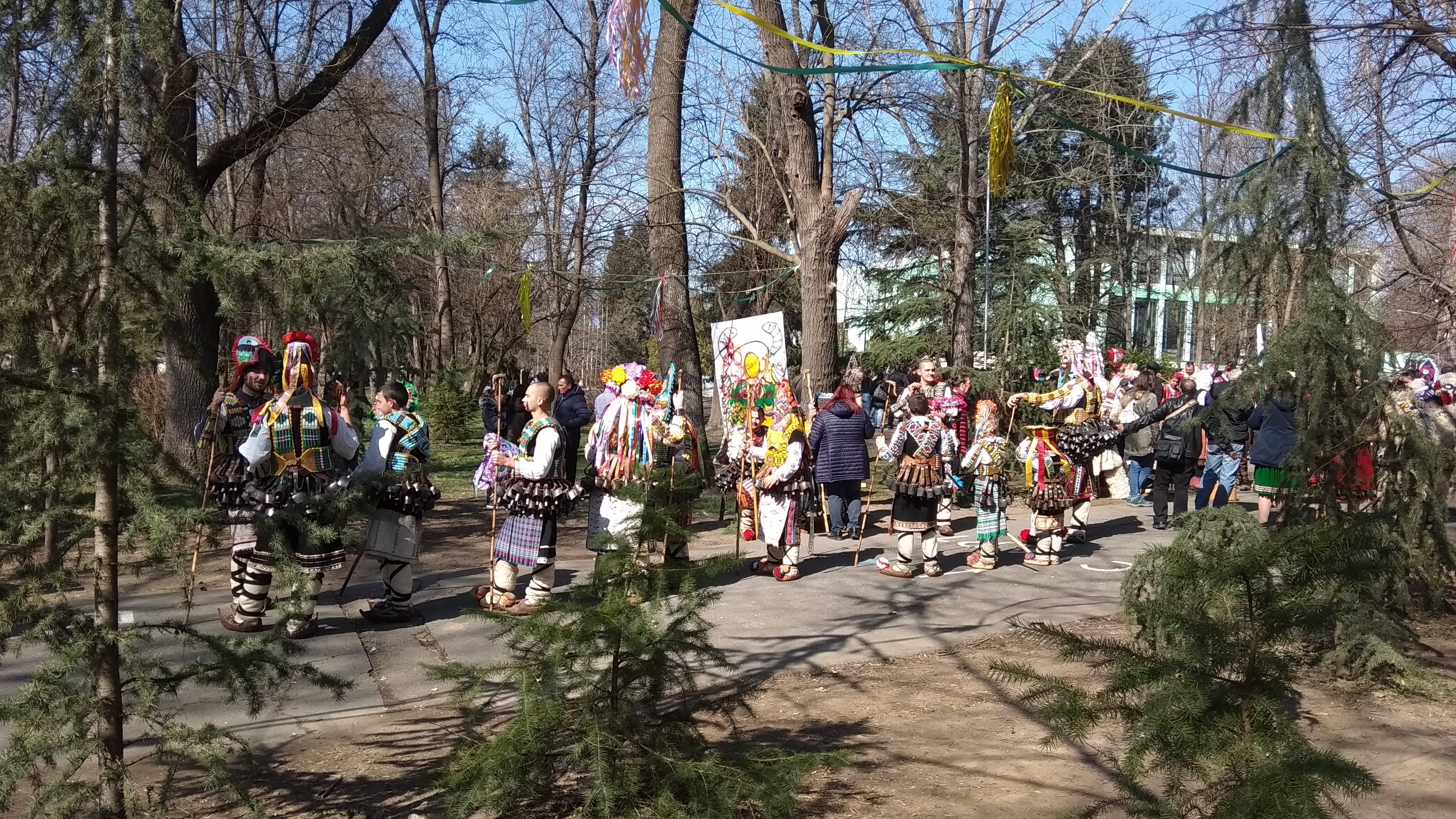
Kukerlandia-2020 - ХХI-st International Masquerade Festival - Yambol, Bulgaria

=== Museums ===
Yambol houses the Regional History Museum and has a military museum, the Battle Glory Museum. As one of the city’s most historically significant cultural sites, Bezisten has existed for five centuries as a closed market, a city mall built during the Ottoman Empire. In 2015, Bezisten opened its doors to the public as an interactive museum. The museum is a major cultural and information centre which promotes the rich heritage of Yambol and the region. In celebration of European Heritage Days 2019, the museum Bezisten hosted special events dedicated to celebrating arts and entertainment. One of these events honored the 510th anniversary of the construction of the building.

=== Arts and entertainment ===
The city has a Dramatic Theatre Nevena Kokanova, as well as a Puppet Theatre Georgi Mitev. The Dramatic Theatre hosts actors from all over the country throughout the year. Movie theater Elite shows the latest films.

=== Sports ===
The most popular sport in the city is Basketball. Yambol's basketball club is BC Yambol, and home matches are played at Sports Hall Diana. In 2002, BC Yambol won the national championship of the National Basketball League (Bulgaria).

== Education ==
- Faculty of Engineering and Technology Yambol

== Notable people ==
- George Papazov, painter
- Georgi Gospodinov, author
- Volen Siderov, journalist and politician
- Peter Noikov, educator
- Encho Keryazov, artist de:Encho Keryazov
- Reyhan Angelova, singer

== Twin towns and sister cities ==
Yambol is twinned with:

- Berdyansk, Ukraine
- Edirne, Turkey
- Izhevsk, Russia
- Sieradz, Poland
- Târgu Jiu, Romania
- Villejuif, France

== Gallery ==
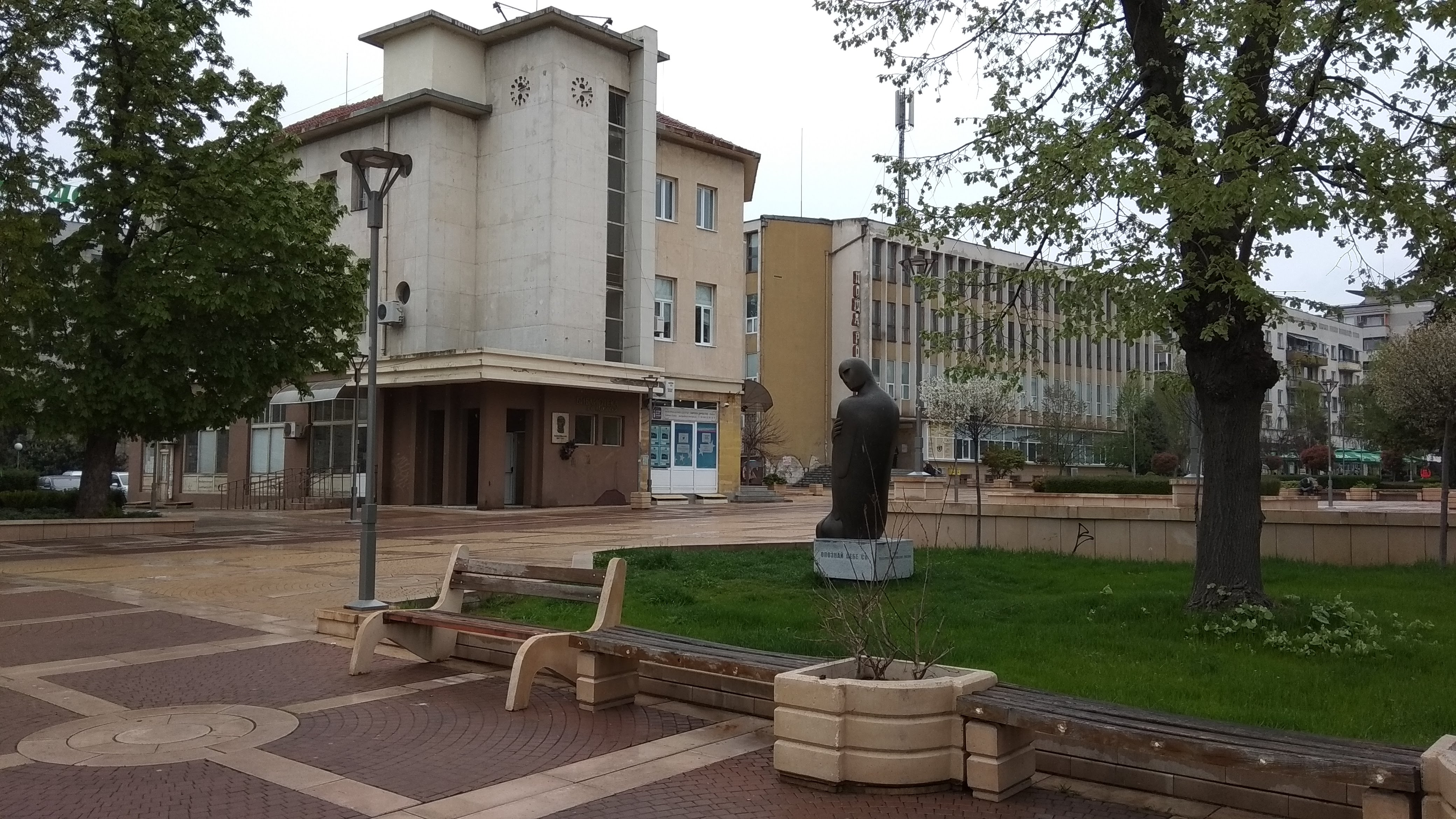
City Library and Central Post Office

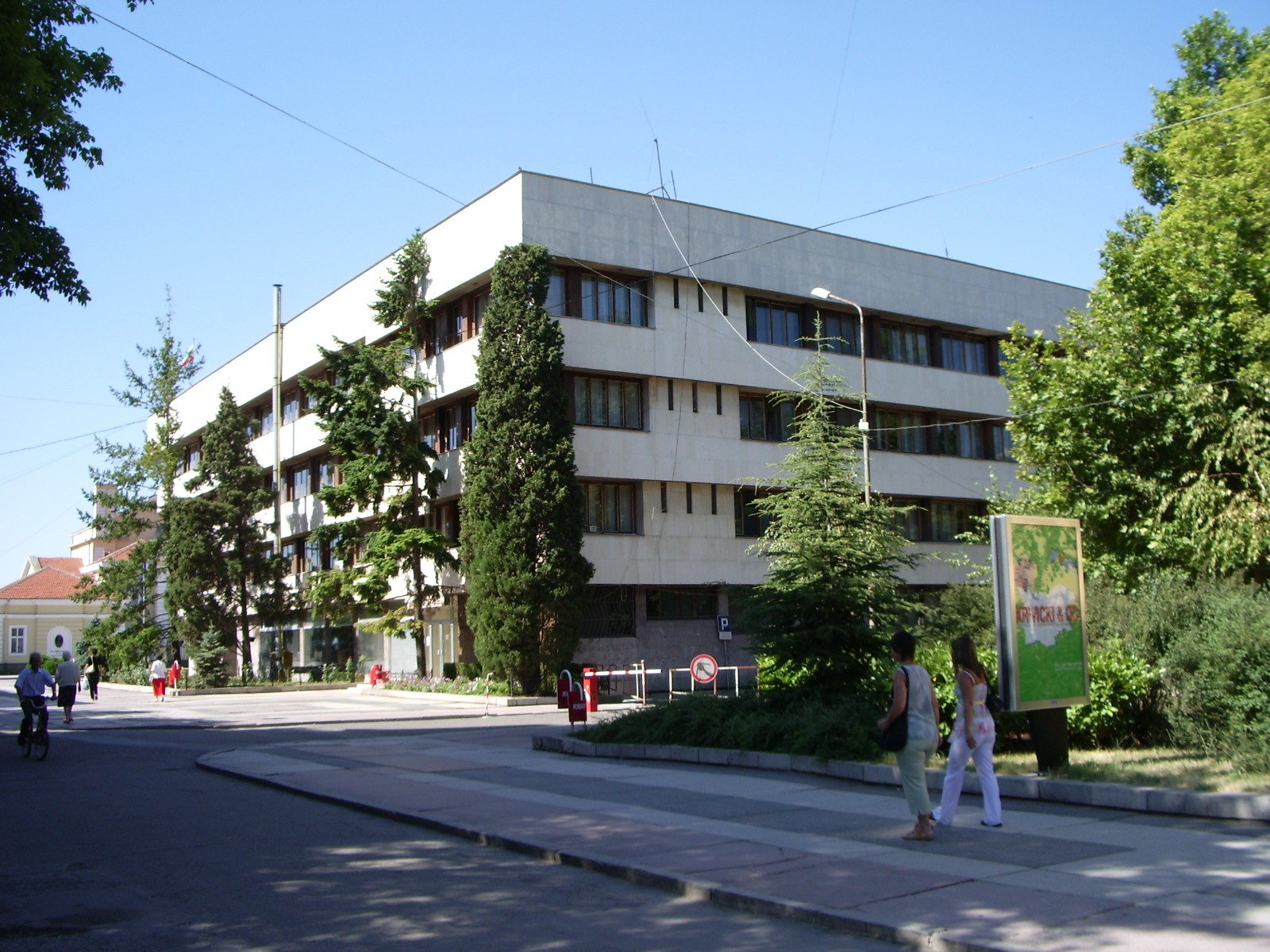
Municipality Building, Yambol

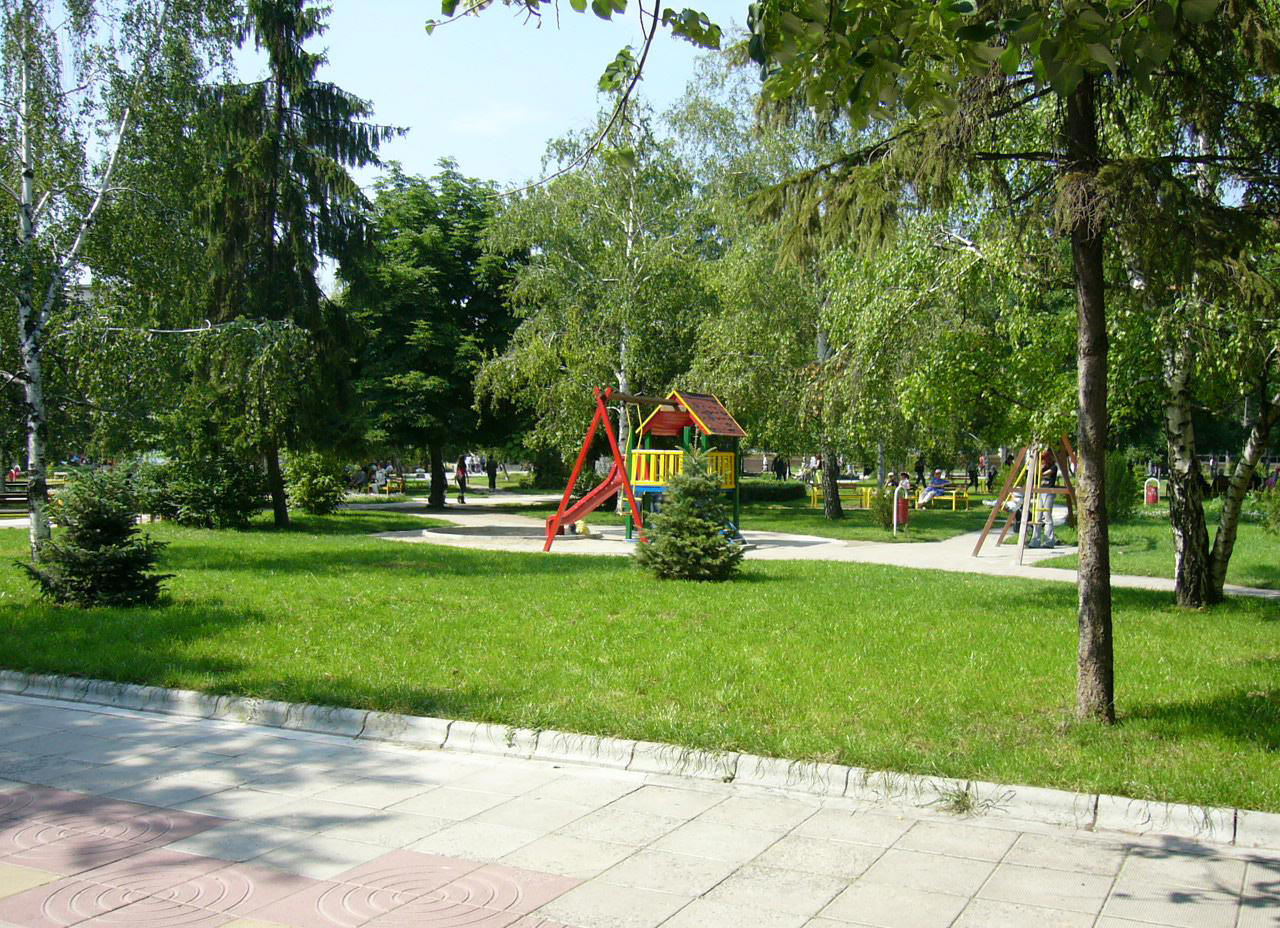
Garden in front of the Central Post Office

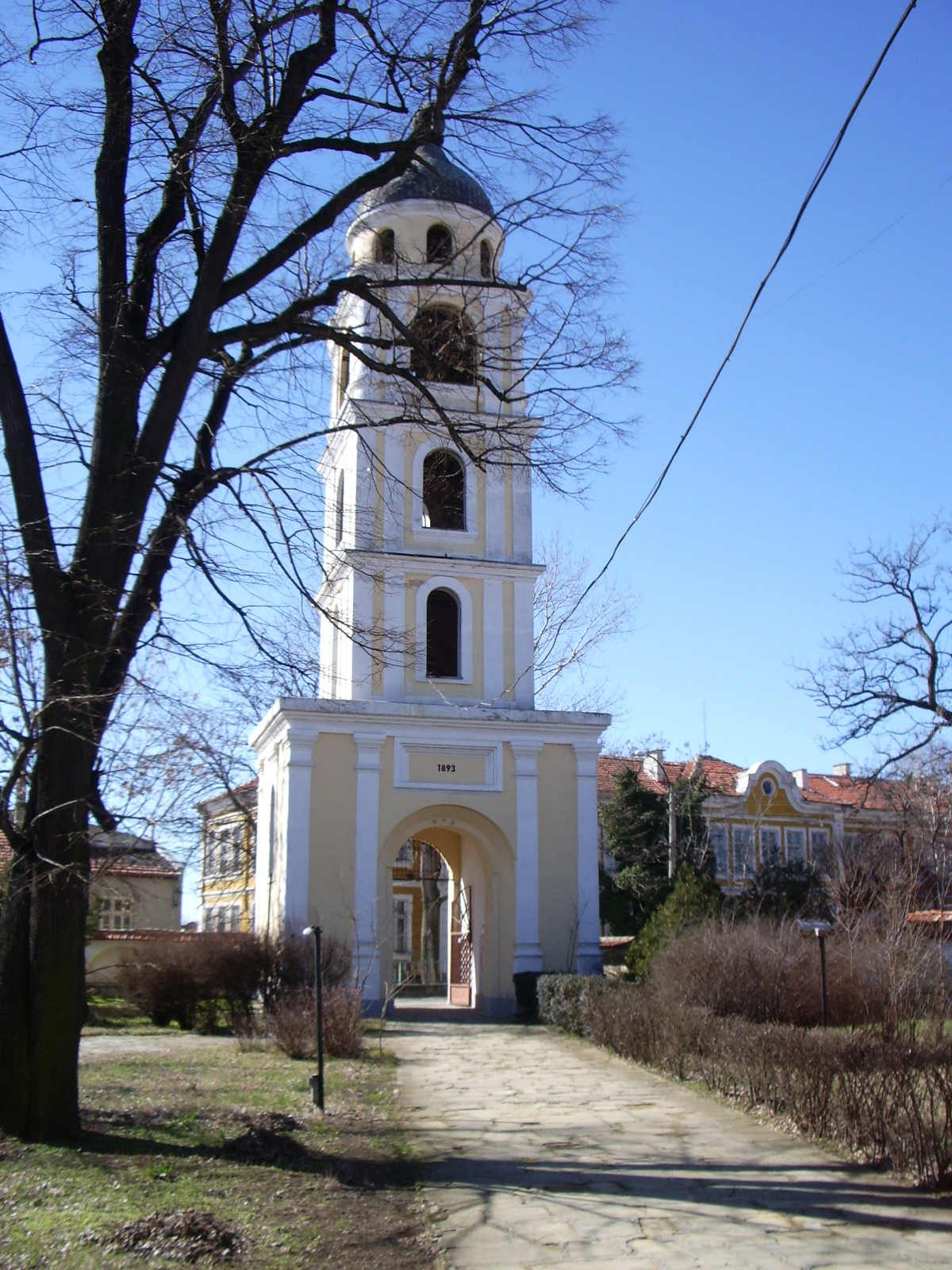
The Bell Tower of St. George Church, built in 1893

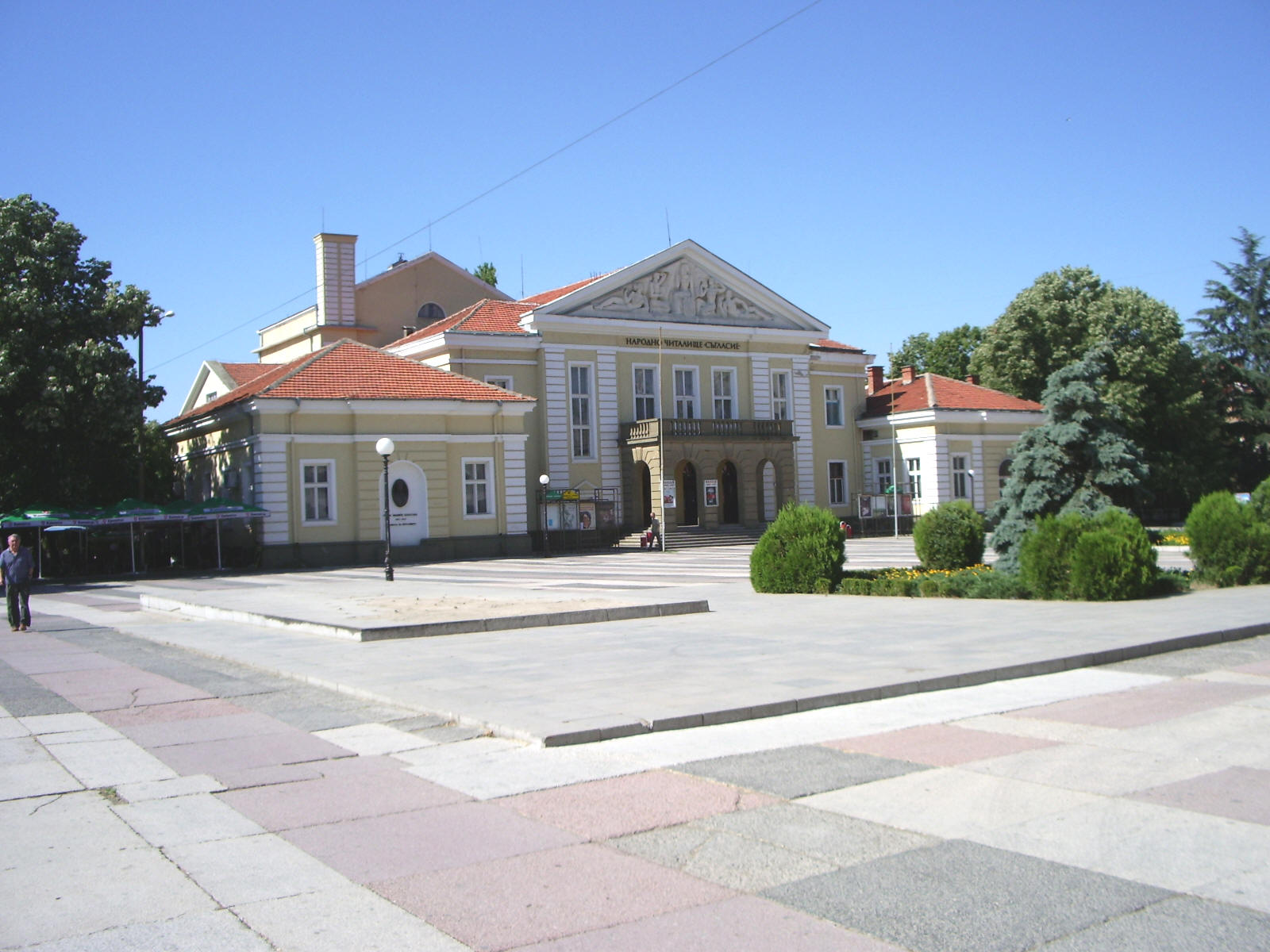
The Theater of Yambol

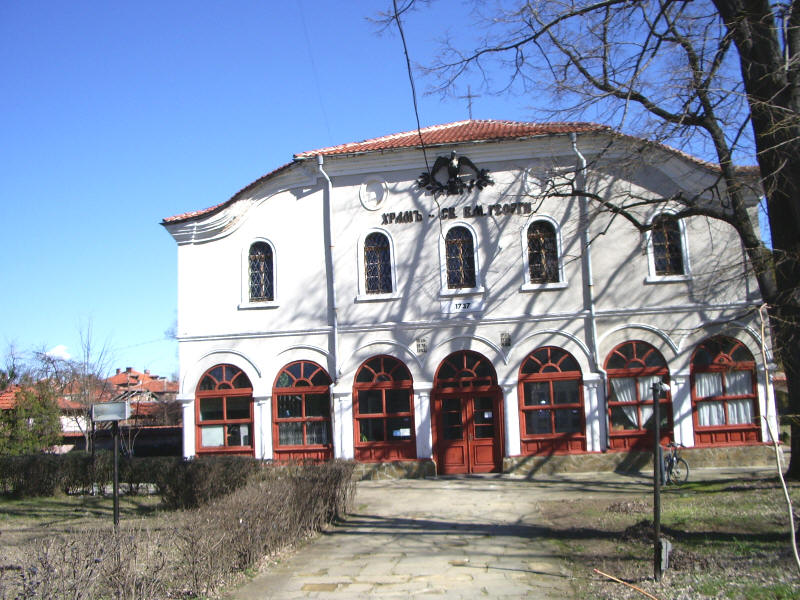
Church of St George, built in 1737

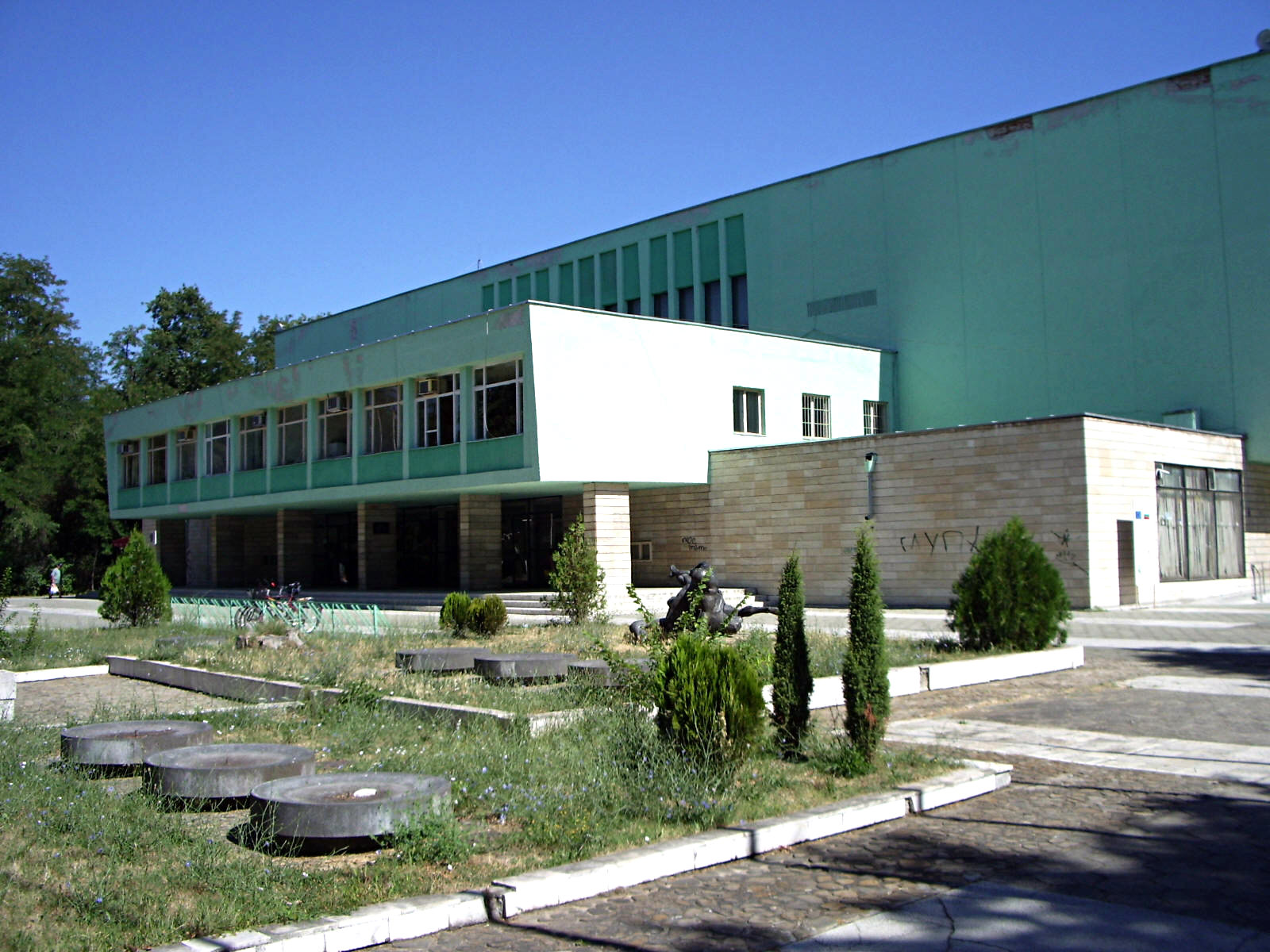
Sport center "Diana", Yambol

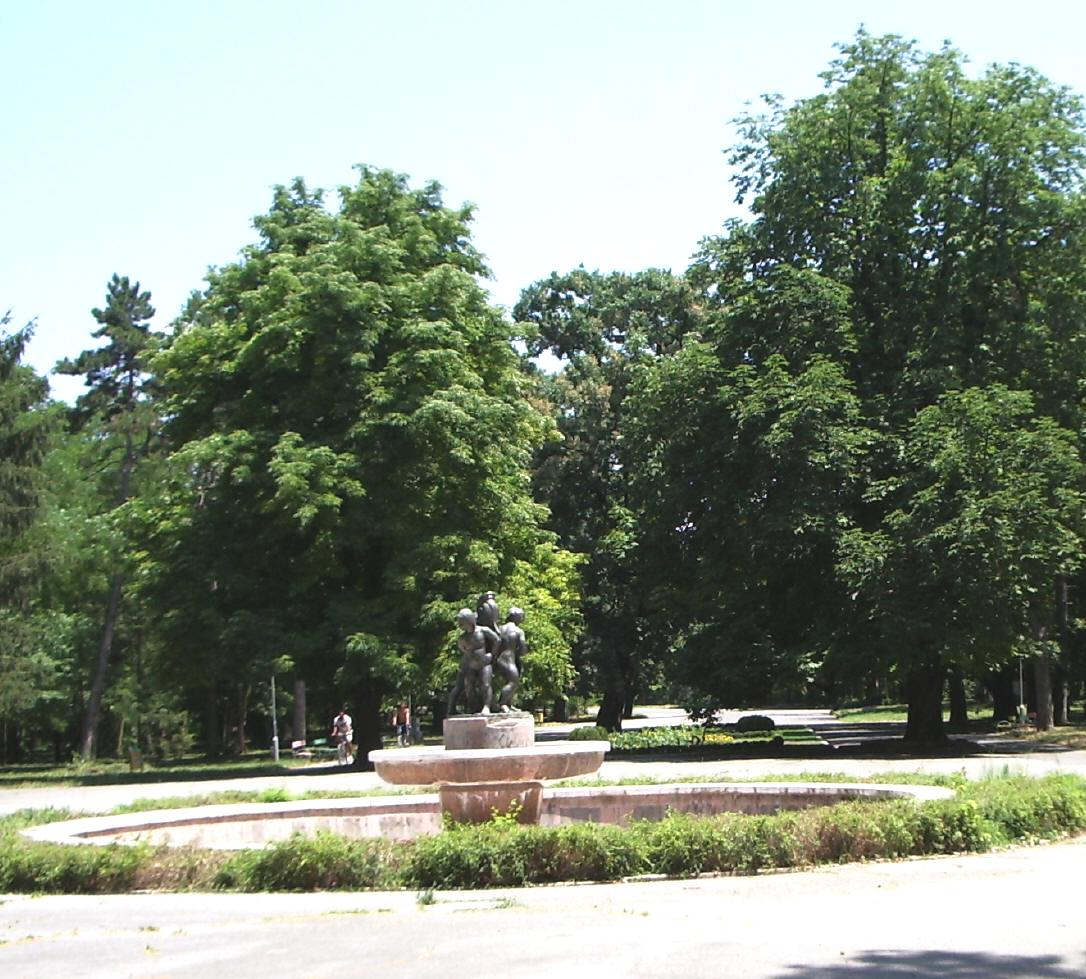
Yambol City Park

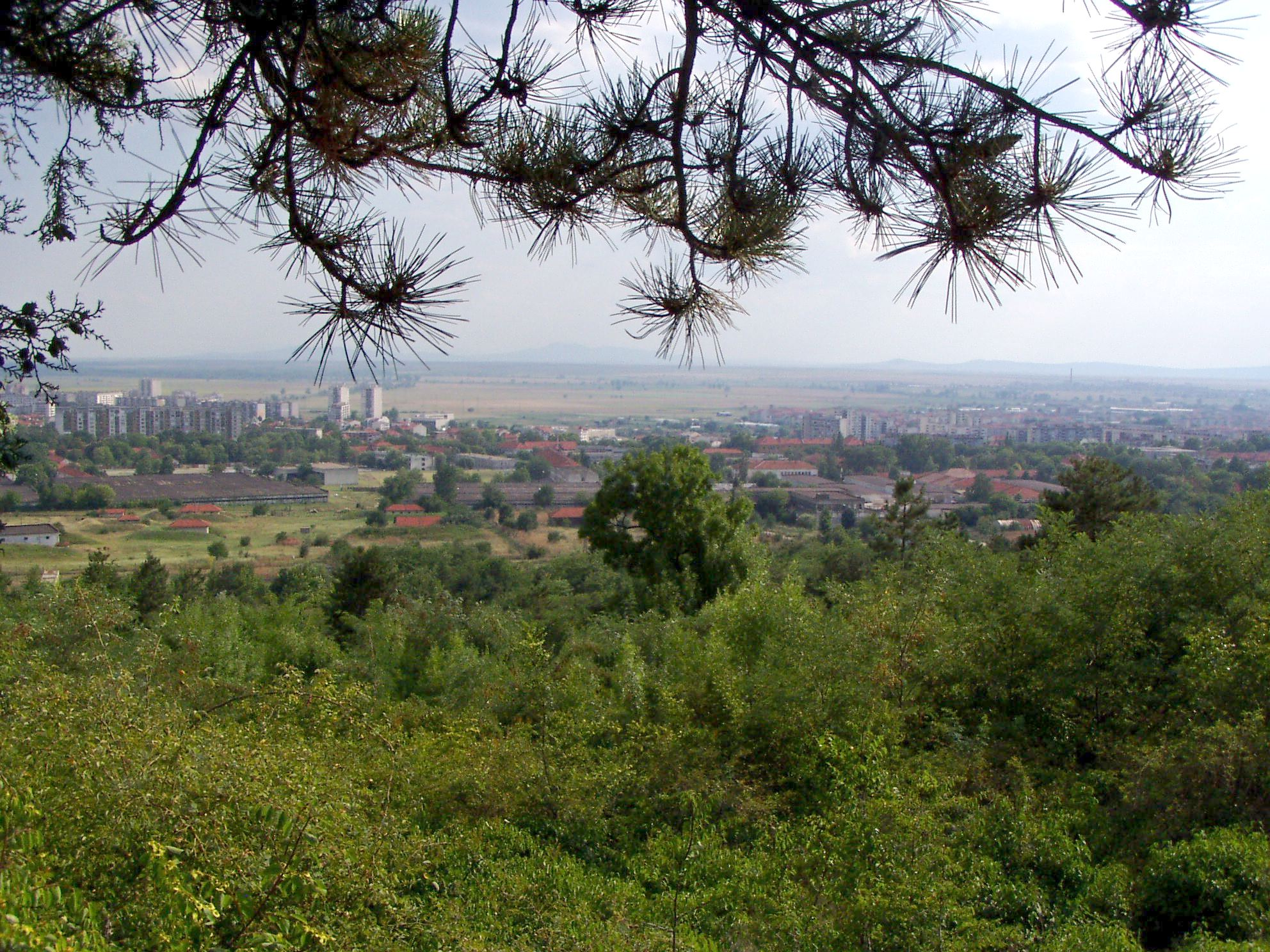
Panoramic view of the city visible from Borovets

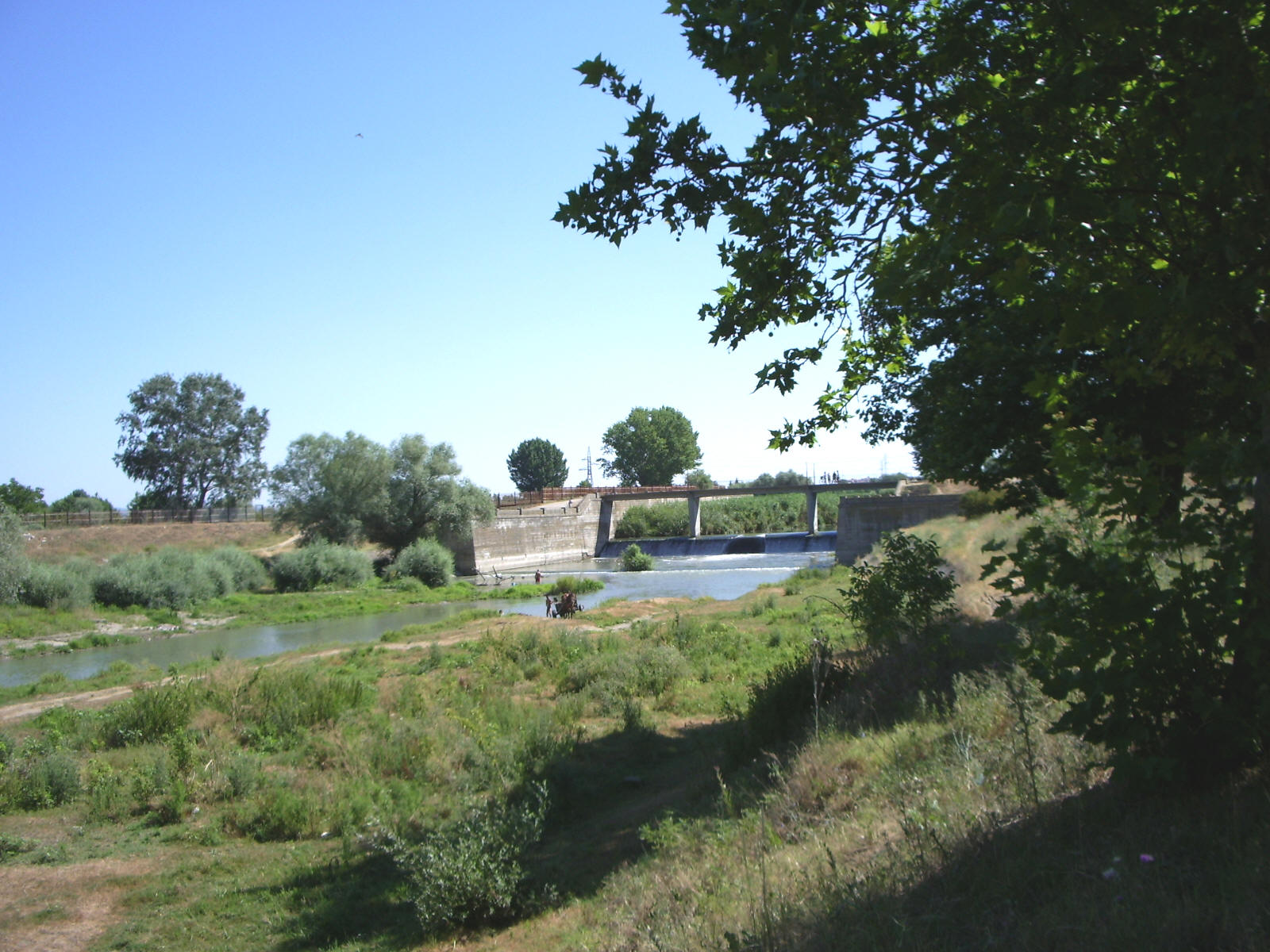
Tundzha River

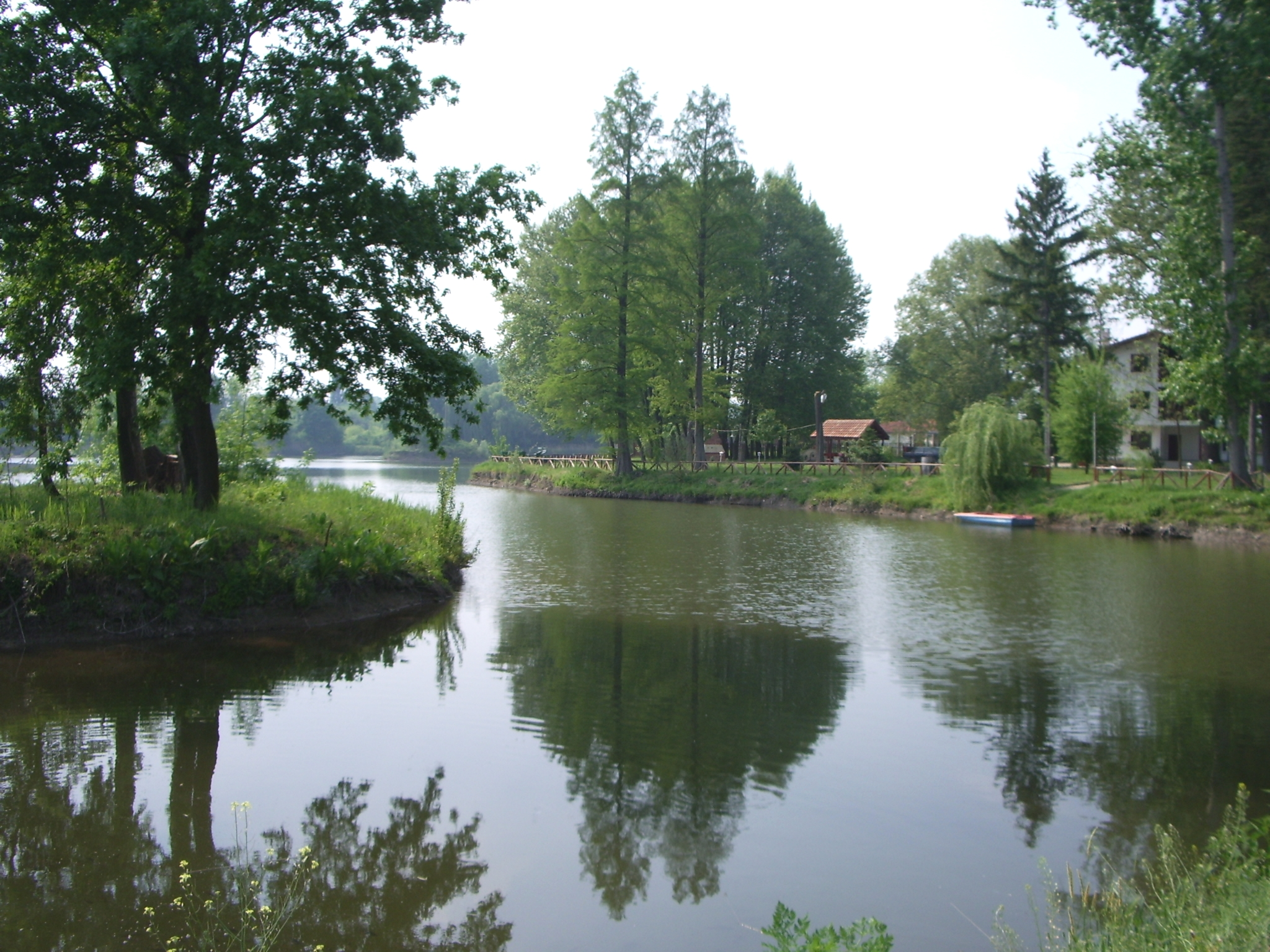
Park Ormana

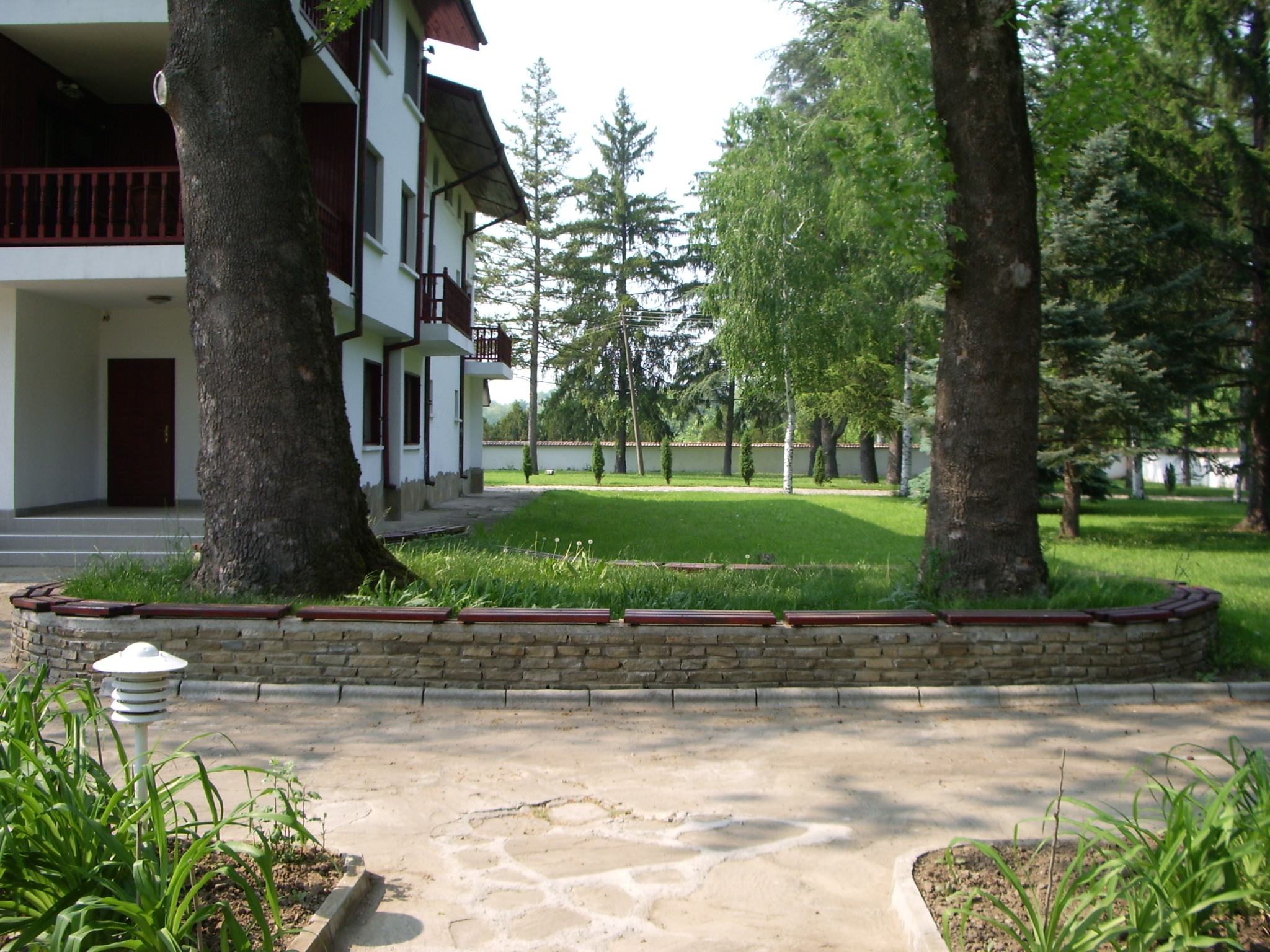
Park Ormana

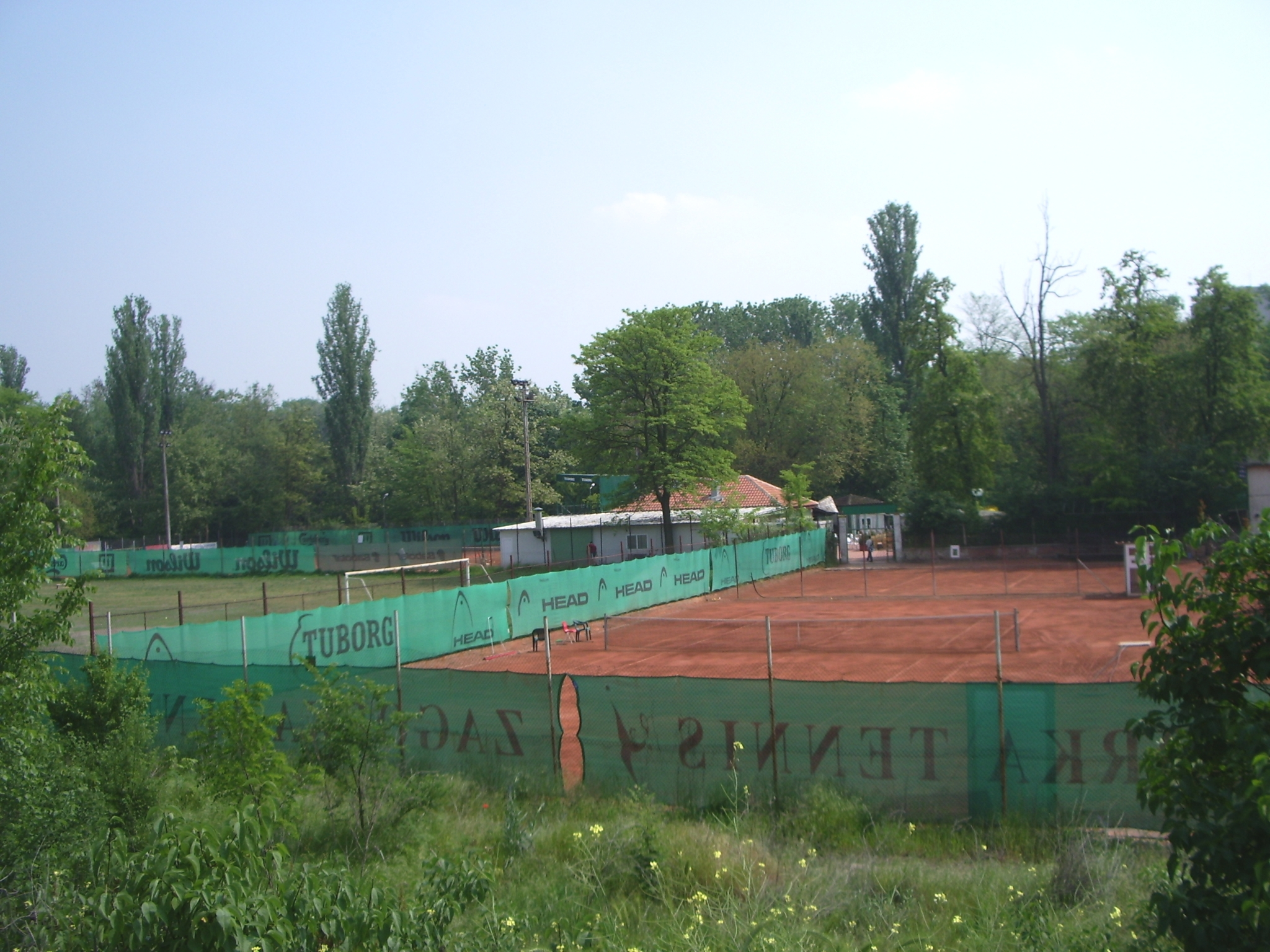
City park

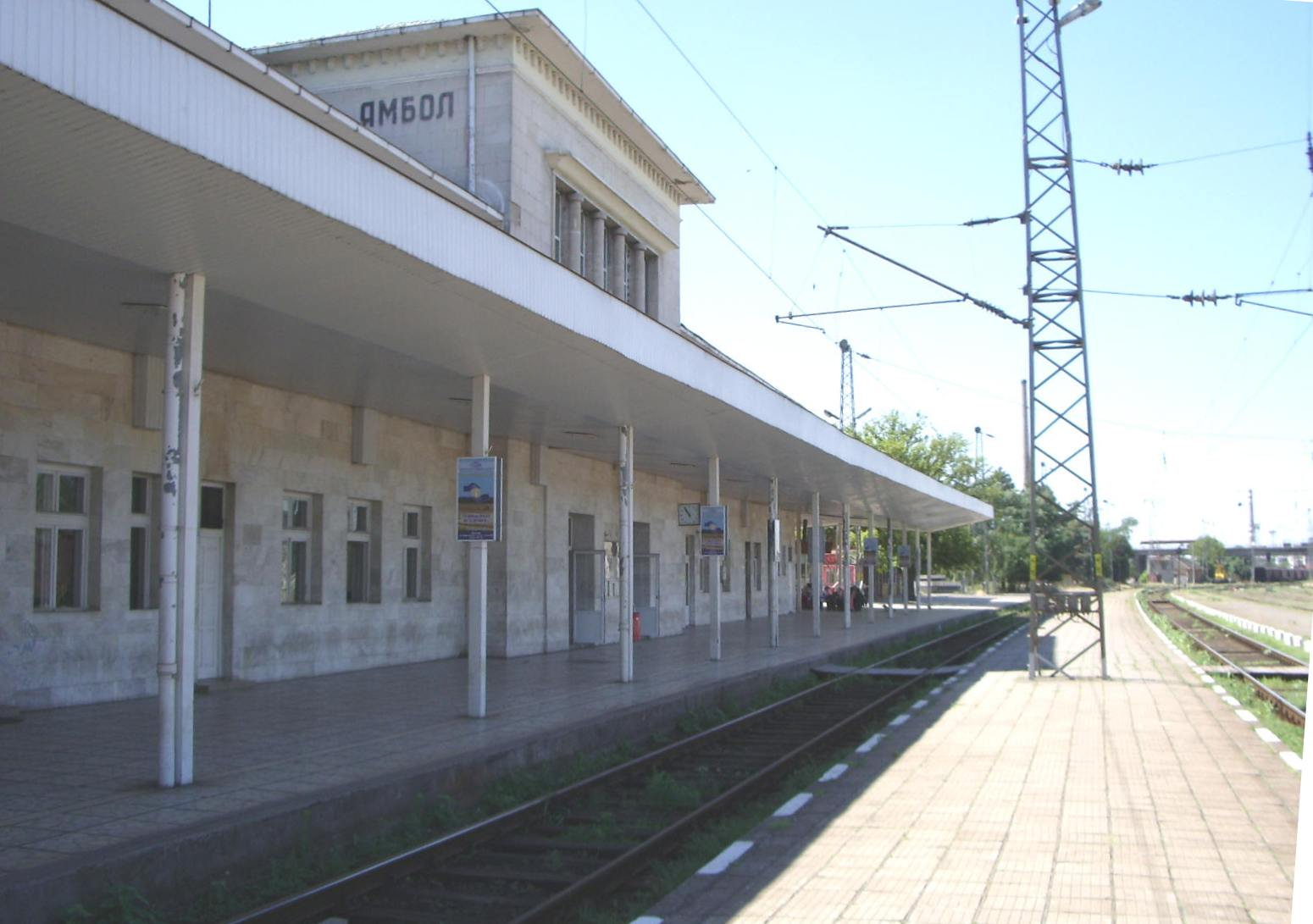
Railway station

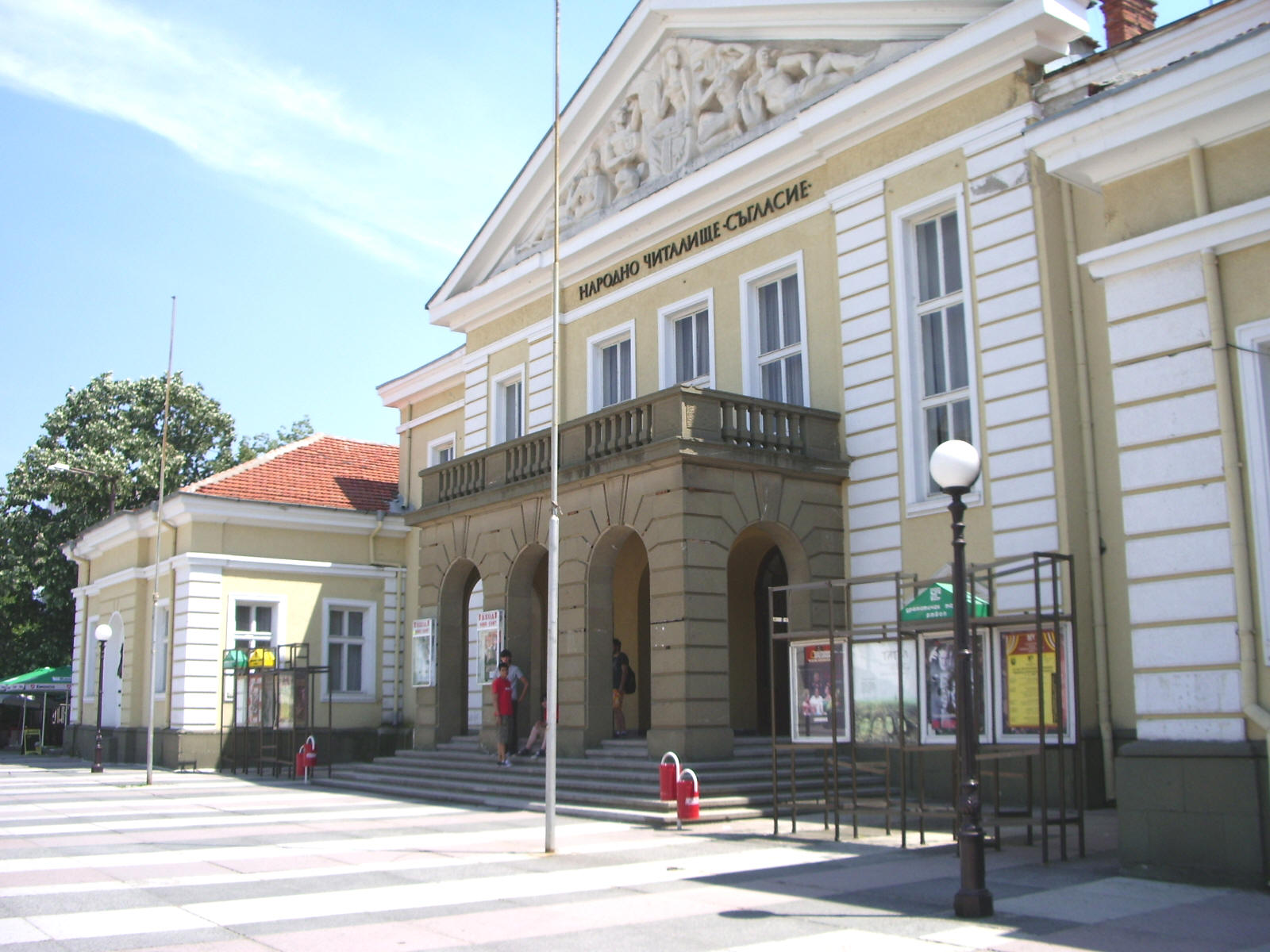
The Theatre

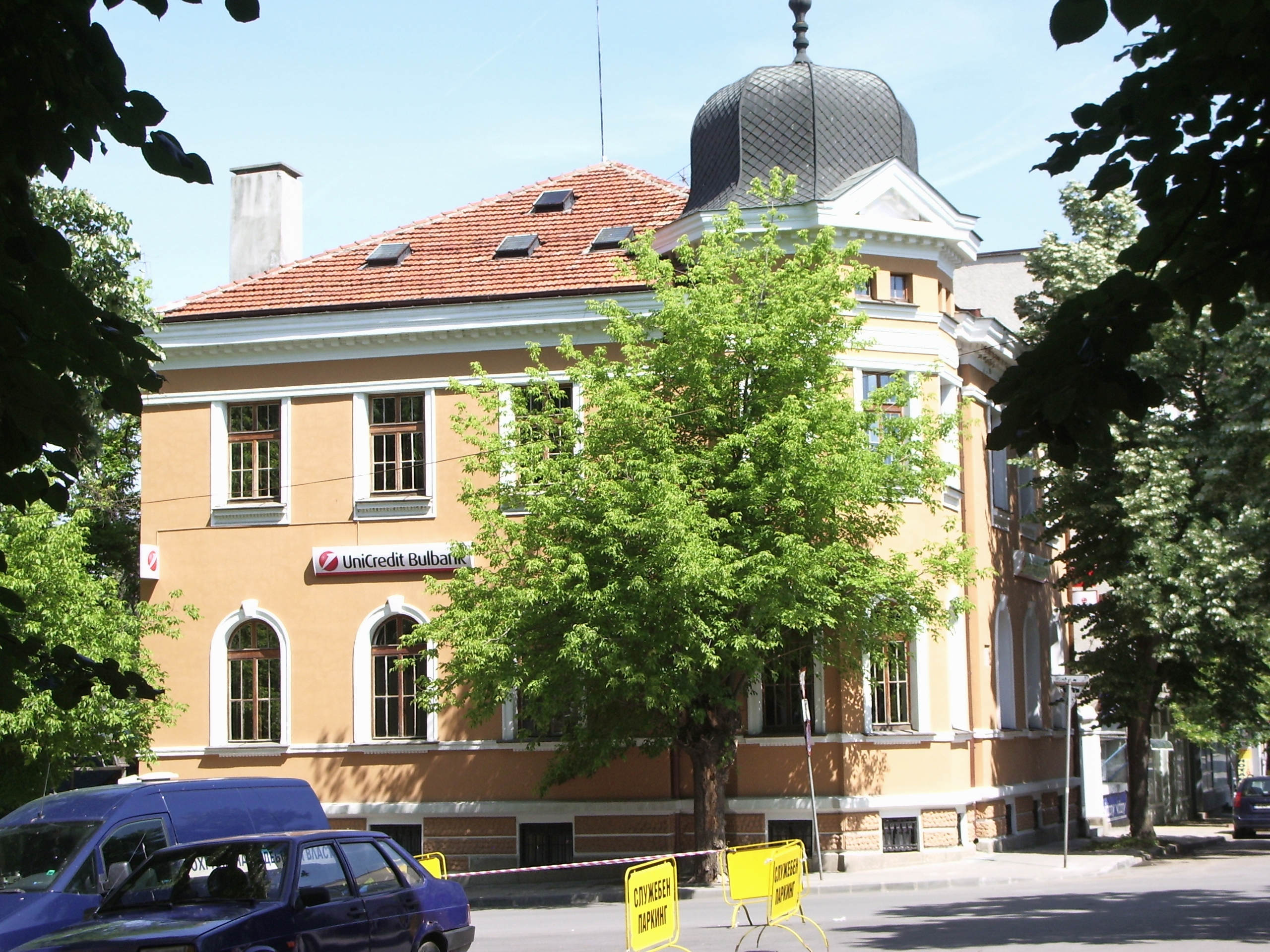
Old building, "G.Papazov" str. / "A.Stamboliiski" str.

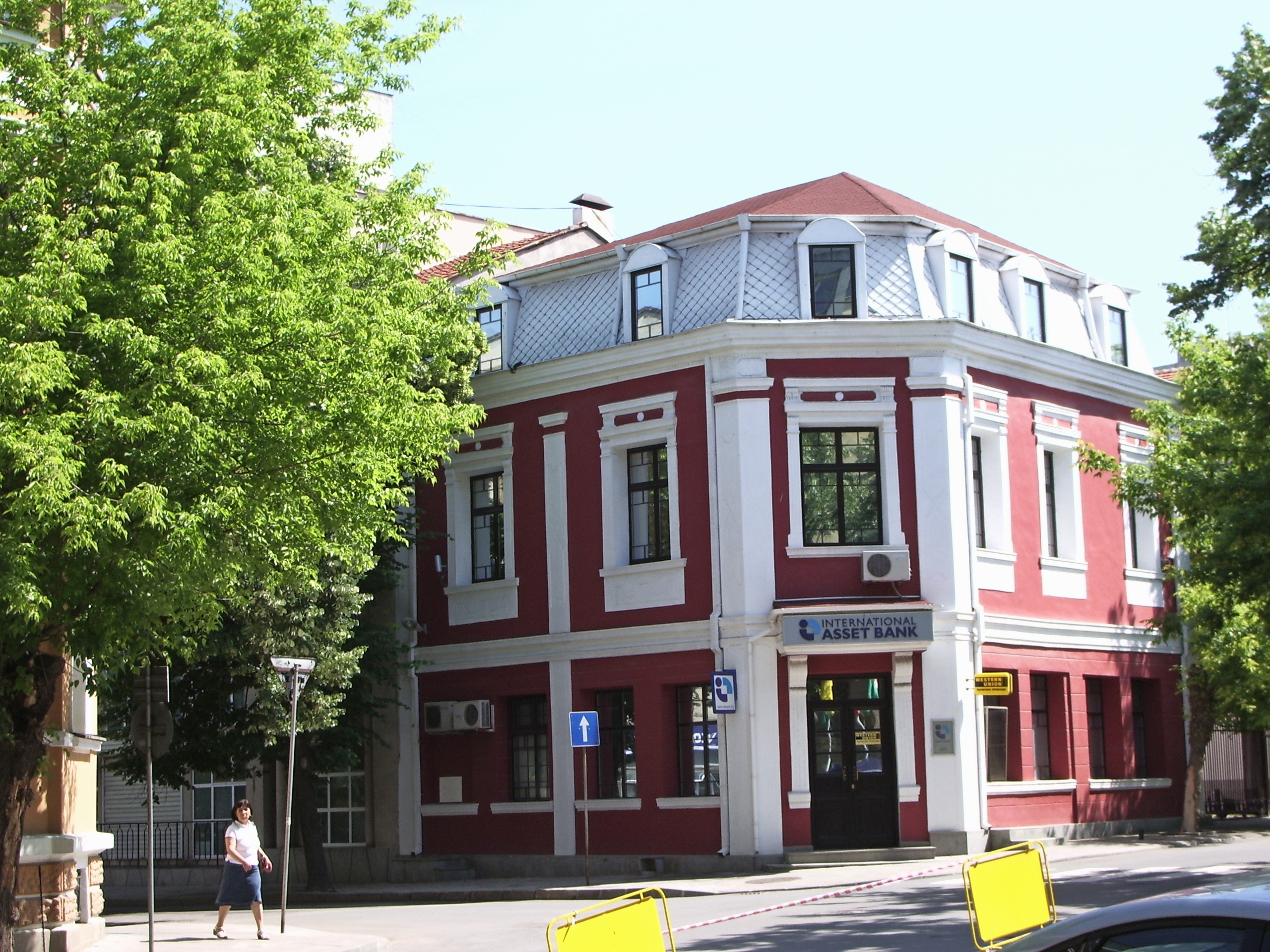
"G.Papazov" str. - International Asset Bank

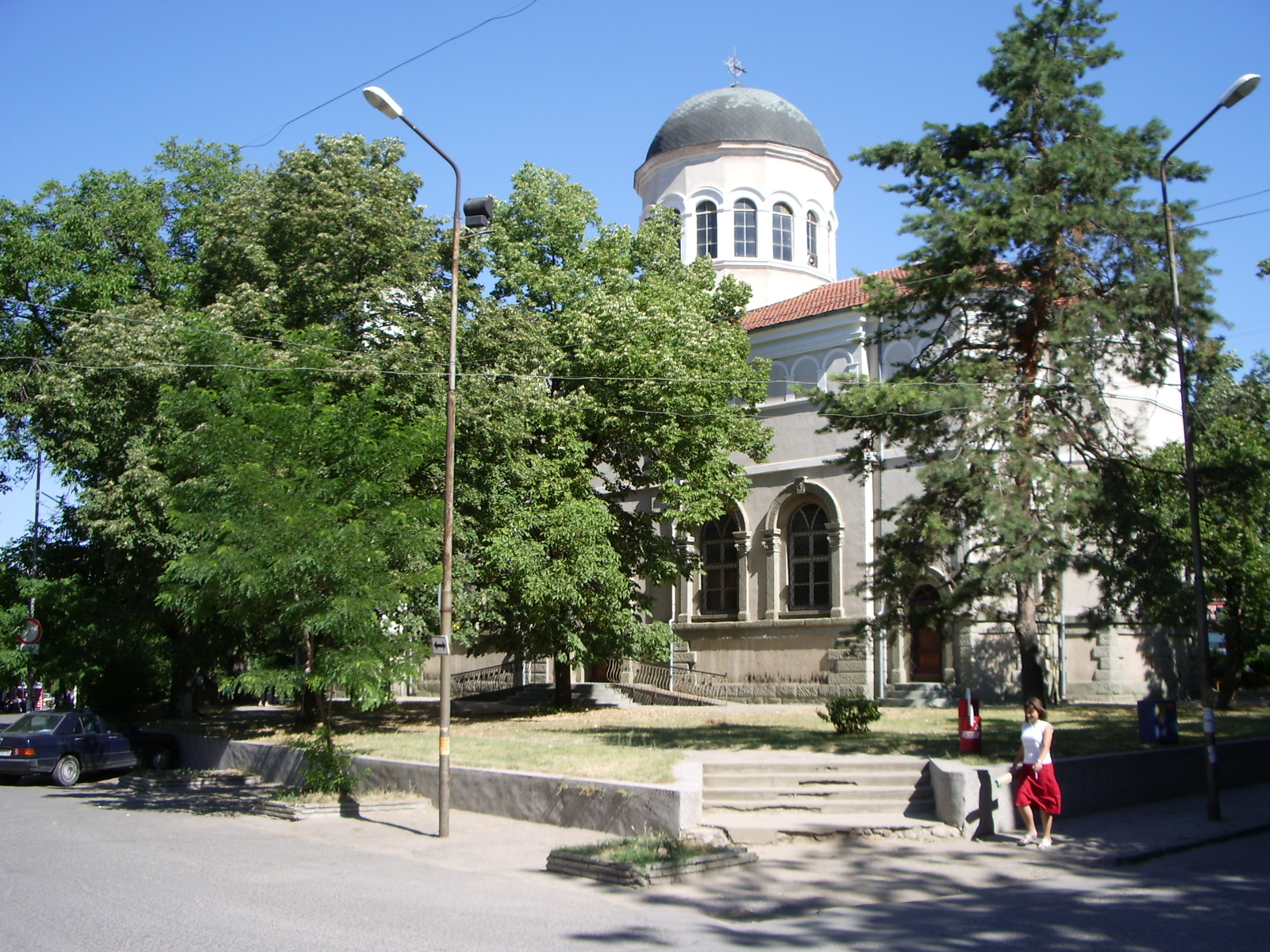
St. Nikola church

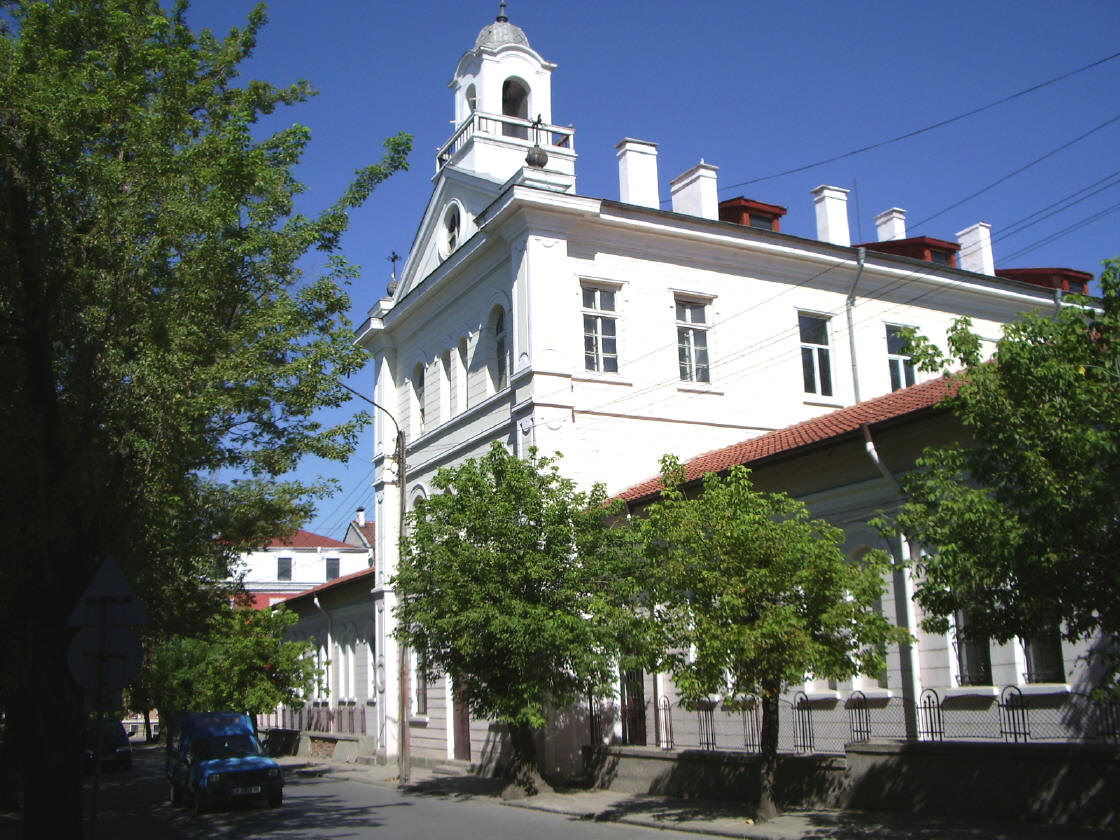
The Roman Catholic church

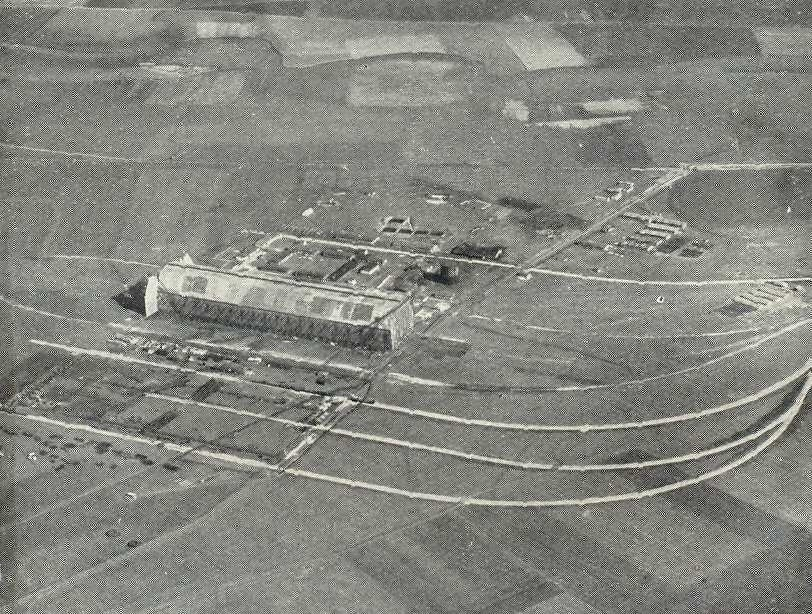
The Bulgarian and German Imperial Air Force base
