= Bibliography of Stanisław Lem =

List of works about Polish science fiction writer Stanisław Lem

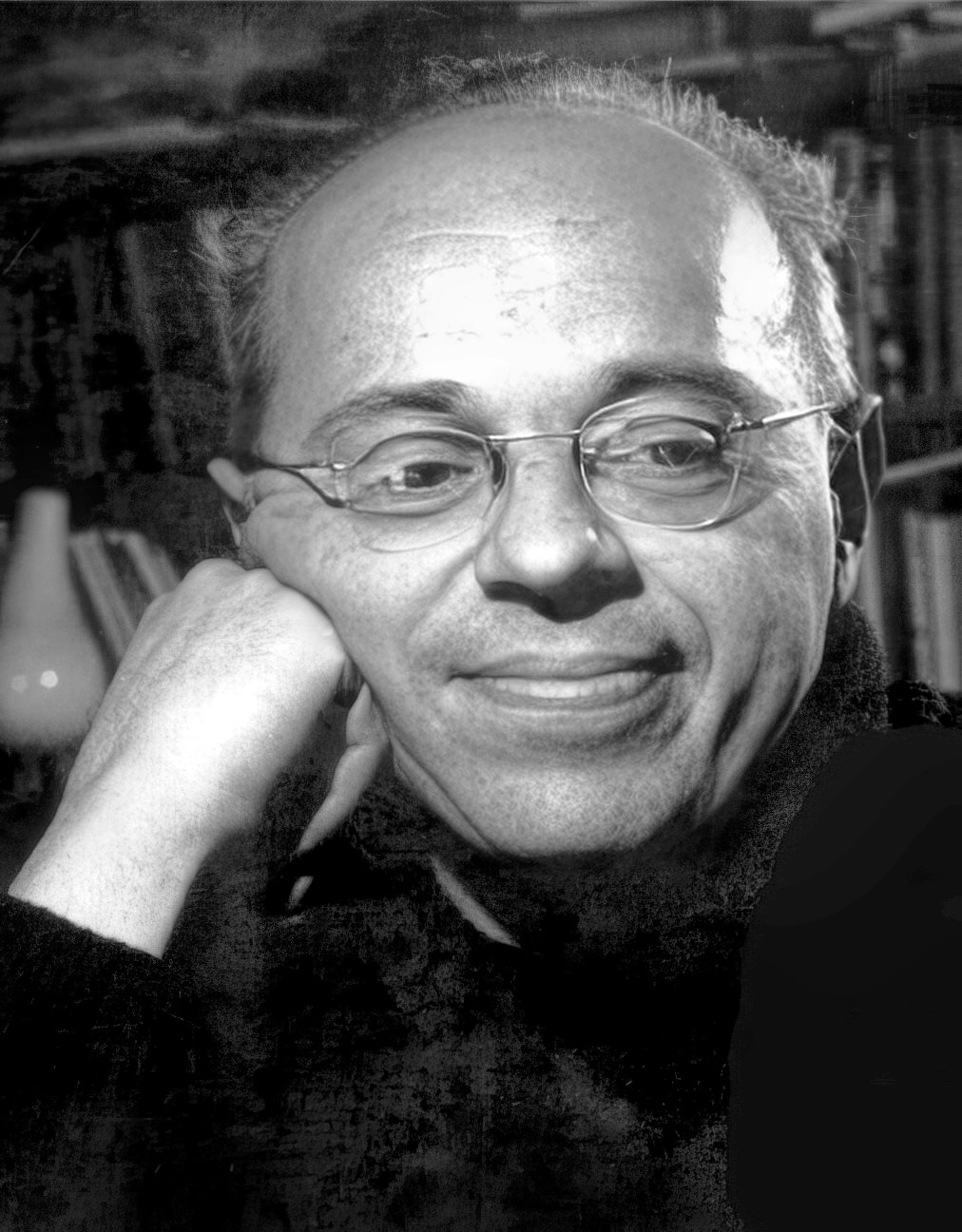

This is a list of works about Lem. For a list of works of Lem, see List of works by Stanisław Lem and their adaptations

This bibliography of Stanisław Lem is a list of works about Stanisław Lem, a Polish science fiction writer and essayist.

In addition to books and numerous academic articles, Lem's works and ideas have been a subject of a number of Ph.D. and master theses.

== Books about Lem ==
- 2021: Lech Keller, Stanisław Lem w PRL-u czyli niewygodna prawda w zwiększonej objętości - Stanisław Lem in the People's Republic of Poland, or the Inconvenient Truth in an Enlarged Volume) - Acta Polonica Monashiensis (Monash University: Melbourne, Victoria, Australia) Volume 5 Number 1 - The inconvenient truth that Stanisław Lem was for a long time the 'pet' of the communist regime
- 2021: Lech Keller, Stanisław Lem Little Known - Acta Polonica Monashiensis (Monash University: Melbourne, Victoria, Australia) Volume 4 Number 1 - Biography of Lem in English Lem Little Known
- 2021: Agnieszka Gajewska, Stanisław Lem. Wypędzony z Wysokiego Zamku (Stanislaw Lem. Banished from the High Castle) Wydawnictwo Literackie, Kraków, ISBN 9788308074527
- 2019: Lech Keller, Wstęp do Lemologii (Introduction to Lemology) - Acta Polonica Monashiensis (Monash University: Melbourne, Victoria, Australia) Volume 3 Number 1 - about lemology and lemologists
- 2019: Shafikov, Sagit [Сагит Шафиков], Философская фантастика Станислава Лема [Stanislav Lem's Philosophical fiction], ISBN 978-5-9765-3974-7
- 2019: Lech Keller, Przyczynek do biografii Stanisława Lema (Contribution to Biography of Stanislas Lem) - Acta Polonica Monashiensis (Monash University: Melbourne, Victoria, Australia) Volume 3 Number 2
- 2017: Wojciech Orliński, Lem. Życie nie z tej ziemi ("Lem. Life Not From This World") - this is the second book of Orliński about Lem. The book cover states that this is the first biography of Lem published in Poland. The author uncovered a considerable amount of little-known information about Lem's life.; Russian translation: "Лем. Жизнь на другой Земле" (Fanzon, 2019, ISBN 9785041019969)
- 2017: Andrzej Wasilewski, Teoria literatury Stanisława Lema ("Stanislaw Lem's Theory of Literature"), Forma, Szczecin, 2017, ISBN 978-83-65778-12-3
- 2016: Agnieszka Gajewska, Zagłada i gwiazdy Przeszłość w prozie Stanisława Lema. Wydawnictwo Naukowe UAM, Poznań, ISBN 978-83-232-3047-2
  Agnieszka Gajewska was first to uncover many unknown documents concerning Lem's life during World War II, which has long been a mystery. Lem simply refused to speak about these times. Gajewska demonstrates that events of these times were encoded in various hints in Lem's fiction.
- 2015: Геннадий Прашкевич, Владимир Борисов (Gennadiy Prashkevich, Vladimir Borisov), Станислав Лем ("Stanislav Lem"), Moscow: Молодая гвардия (Molodaya gvardiya), Series: Zhizn zamechatelnykh lyudiey (Life of Remarkable Persons) ISBN 978-5-235-03777-9
  - A reviewer points out numerous and overly generous (sometimes full pages) quotations of Lem, although he remarks that Lem can often explain Lem better than others.
- 2015: Peter Swirski, Stanislaw Lem: Philosopher of the Future, ISBN 1781381860
- 2014: Язневич В.И. (Jaznewich W.I.), Станислав Лем ("Stanisław Lem"), Minsk (Belarus): Книжный Дом, Series: Мыслители ХХ столетия (Thinkers of the Twentieth Century) ISBN 978-985-17-0830-3
- 2013: Peter Swirski, From Literature to Biterature: Lem, Turing, Darwin, and Explorations in Computer Literature, Philosophy of Mind, and Cultural Evolution
  " I’m trying to explore the ultimate future of literature by exploring the nature of beings who will create it. If my scenario is correct, “biterature,” as written by computer authors or “computhors,” will be a manifestation of the beginning of the end of the cultural world as we know it. In that sense, From Literature to Biterature is really a book about our human future in the age of thinking machines."
- 2010: Lech Keller: Visions of the future in the writings of Stanisław Lem, Saarbrücken: Lap Lambert
  - Vol. 1: "Visions of the Future" ISBN 978-3838359007
  - Vol. 2: "Annotated and Cross-Referenced Primary and Secondary Bibliography of Stanisław Lem" ISBN 978-3838369426
- 2010: Paweł Okołowski, MATERIA I WARTOŚCI. NEOLUKRECJANIZM STANISŁAWA LEMA 978-83-235-0664-5
- 2010: Wojciech Michera, Piękna jako bestia. Przyczynek do teorii obrazu, ISBN 978-83-229-2854-7
- 2009: Tomasz Lem, Awantury na tle powszechnego ciążenia ("Tantrums on the Background of the Universal Gravity"), Wydawnictwo Literackie, Kraków, 272pp.
  A memoir by Stanislaw Lem's son, with an afterword by Tomasz Fiałkowski,
- 2007: Paweł Majewski, Między zwierzęciem a maszyną. Utopia technologiczna Stanisława Lema, 978-83-229-2854-7
- 2007: Wojciech Orliński, Co to są sepulki? Wszystko o Lemie ("What Are Sepulki? Everything About Lem"), Wydawnictwo Znak, Kraków 2007, ISBN 978-83-240-0798-1
  A wealth of answers about words invented by Lem, origins of Lem's ideas, peculiarities of plot elements, and other details interesting for Lem's fans
  Despite the catchy title, the book is a collection of biographical and bibliographical factoids without coherent, continuous narrative. The second book of the author about Lem (2017) is a considerably more thorough work.
- 2006 (also a 2016 expanded edition): Marek Oramus, Bogowie Lema (Gods of Lem) ISBN 978-83-89738-92-9, a collection of essays and interviews which show a less hagiographical and more controversial image of Lem, plus a short story "Miejsce na Ziemi", which is an unusual interpretation of Lem's Return from the Stars
- 2006: Maciej Płaza, O POZNANIU W TWÓRCZOŚCI STANISŁAWA LEMA, ISBN 83-229-2765-7
- 2005: Maciej Dajnowski, GROTESKA W TWÓRCZOŚCI STANISŁAWA LEMA, ISBN 83-7326-303-9
- 2003: Jerzy Jarzębski, Wszechświat Lema ISBN 83-08-03343-1
  Ten texts on a number selected topics in works of Lem and on forms of his writings: political aspects of Lem's science fiction, on the role of chance in Lem's concept of reality and in his axiology, about the history of the Reason and the technological evolution, about relationship with religion, about the problem of communication with the aliens, about the particularity of Lem's essay writing, its transformations and connection with literary prose.
- 2001: Peter Swirski, "Between Literature and Science: Poe, Lem, and Explorations in Aesthetics, Cognitive Science, and Literary Knowledge"
- 1997: Zygmunt Tecza, Das Wortspiel in der Übersetzung: Stanislaw Lems Spiele mit dem Wort als Gegenstand interlingualen Transfers ("The wordplay in the translation : Stanislaw Lem's plays with the word as an object of interlingual transfers"), 1997 (Max Neimeyer Verlag, ISBN 3-484-30367-0), reprinted 2011 (Walter de Gruyter, ISBN 3110959968)
  The work analyzes 1395 Polish-language and 1736 German-language puns from eight original works by Stanislaw Lem and their translations into German.
- 1998: Mariusz M. Leś, Stanisław Lem wobec utopii, 1998, ISBN 8386188200
  - The book is based on master's thesis of the author. It analyses numerous utopias and dystopias in Lem's novels and short stories.
- 1996: Małgorzata Szpakowska, DYSKUSJE ZE STANISŁAWEM LEMEM, ISBN 83-85254-36-6
- 1995: Antoni Smuszkiewicz, Stanislaw Lem, ISBN 83-7120-184-2
  - The book is focused on Lem's worldview.
- 1995 Pavel Weigel, Stanisław Lem. Životopis (Stanisław Lem. A Biography) Praha: Magnet Press
- 1994: Piotr Krywak, Fantastyka Lema: droga do "Fiaska", Krakow, 1994, ISBN 83-85898-75-1
- 1990: J. Madison Davis, Stanislaw Lem San Bernardino (Calif., US) & Mercer Island (Washington, US): Starmont House, Series: Starmont Reader’s Guide Nr. 32
- 1990 Andrzej Stoff, Lem i inni. Szkice o polskiej science fiction (Lem and the Others. Sketches on Polish SF) Bydgoszcz: Wydawnictwo “Pomorze”
- 1987 Stanisław Bereś, Rozmowy ze Stanisławem Lemem (Conversations with Stanisław Lem) Kraków: Wydawnictwo Literackie (Subject: A book-length interview with Lem about his life and writings)
- 1986 Stanisław Bereś Lem über Lem. Gespräche Frankfurt am Main: Insel Verlag - German translation of Rozmowy ze Stanisławem Lemem (Conversations with Stanisław Lem) Kraków: Wydawnictwo Literackie, 1987
- 1986 Wolfgang Thadewald, Stanislaw Lem - Bibliographie für den deutschen Sprachraum (Bibliography of Lem's Works in the German Language) in: Florian Marzin, (ed.) Stanislaw Lem: An den Grenzen der SF und darüber hinaus Meitingen: Corian
- 1985 Florian F. Marzin (ed.). Stanislaw Lem: An den Grenzen der Science Fiction und darüber hinaus (Stanisław Lem: On Borders of SF and Beyond) Meitingen: Corian-Verlag Heinrich Wimmer
- 1985: Richard E. Ziegfeld, Stanislaw Lem NY: Frederick Ungar Publishing Company
- 1983: Andrzej Stoff, Powieści fantastyczno-naukowe Stanisława Lema (SF novels of S. Lem) ISBN 83-01-05044-6
- 1973: Ewa Balcerzak, Stanisław Lem Warszawa: Agencja Autorska (Authors’ Agency) - translated by: Krystyna Cekalska from Stanisław Lem Warszawa: PIW, 1973
- 1973: Ewa Balcerzak, Stanisław Lem Warszawa: Państwowy Instytut Wydawniczy (PIW)

== Collections of articles and essays about Lem ==
- 2015: Quart magazine, no. 3-4, 247pp.
  A special issue of the quarterly of the Institute of the History of Arts, Wroclaw University, with materials from the 2015 lemological conference, Wroclaw
- 2014: Lemography: Stanislaw Lem in the Eyes of the World, ISBN 1781381208
  The collections essays focus on Lem's contributions to philosophy and literary theory. The authors are from Canada, United States, Great Britain, Germany, Croatia, Poland, Sweden and Finland
- 2011: Lem i tłumacze ("Lem and Translators") ISBN 9788376380964
  A collection of descriptions of the reception of Lem's works in several dozens of languages
- 2009: Stanisław Lem: horyzonty wyobraźni, a special issue, Bez Porównania, 1(7), 2009 - materials of a 2007 conference
- 2008: The Art and Science of Stanislaw Lem, ISBN 0773530479
- Materials of two joint German-Polish conferences devoted to Lem, in Krakow (1999) and in Szczecin and Greifswald (2000), were published in two languales, in two slightly different collections of the essays:
  - 2003: Stanisław Lem: Pisarz, myśliciel, człowiek ISBN 83-08-03298-2
  - 2005: Stanisław Lem: Mensch, Denker, Schriftsteller, Beiträge einer deutsch-polnischen Konferenz im Jahr 2000 in Greifswald und Szczecin, Volume 48 of Opera Slavica, ISSN 0085-4514, ISBN 3447051477
    - I. Das Gesamtwerk und seine Grundlagen: J. Jarzebski, Naturliches, Kunstliches und das Loch im Himmel; P. Czaplinski, Stanislaw Lem - Die Spirale des Pessimismus
    - II. Gattungen und Schreibweisen: A. Ohme, Phantastik - Science Fiction - Utopie: Versuch einer Begriffsabgrenzung (am Beispiel ausgewahlter Texte Stanislaw Lems); M. Dajnowski, Zu den Problemen der Groteske Lems. Uber die allgemeine Zudringlichkeit der Drachen der Wahrscheinlichkeit; E. Szczepkowska, Das Spiel mit der Autobiographie in Stanislaw Lems Wysoki Zamek; Christian Prunitsch, Zyklisierende Faktoren in Stanislaw Lems Dzienniki gwiazdowe
    - III. Genderfragen: M. Glasenapp, Femina Astralis - Weiblichkeit in der wissenschaftlichen Phantastik Stanislaw Lems; U. Jekutsch, Das Geschlecht der Maschine: Geschlechterdifferenz in Stanislaw Lems Erzahlungen "Rozprawa" und "Maska"
    - IV. Intertextualitat: A. Fiut, Ein Sarmate in der Zeitmaschine - Stanislaw Lem als Leser; P. Michalowski, Das Babel des 21. Jahrhunderts: Die Bibliotheken Stanislaw Lems und Jorge Luis Borges'; J. Zielinski, Spuren einer Rilke-Lekture im Werk Lems
- 2003: Acta Lemiana Monashiensis - Special Lem Edition of Acta Polonica Monashiensis (edited by Lech Keller, Wojciech Kajtoch and Lila Zarnowski), ISSN 1326-8562
- 1997: A Stanislaw Lem Reader (edited by Peter Swirski)
  From book annotation: "This collection assembles in-depth and insightful writings by and about, and interviews with, one of the most fascinating writers of the twentieth century." It also includes Lem's bibliography
- 1989: LEM W OCZACH KRYTYKI ŚWIATOWEJ, ISBN 83-08-00646-9
  A collection of essays

== Interviews ==
- 1979: Lem, S.: "Interview with Zoran Živković: The Future Without a Future." In: Pacific Manoa Quarterly 4/258, 1979
- 1986: Istvan Csicsery-Ronay, Jr., "Twenty-Two Answers and Two Postscripts: An Interview with Stanislaw Lem", Science Fiction Studies, #40 = Volume 13, Part 3 = November 1986
- 1987: Conversations with Stanisław Lem, (Rozmowy ze Stanisławem Lemem, Stanisław Bereś, Wydawnictwo Literackie Kraków, ISBN 83-08-01656-1)
  Interviews carried out during 1981-1982
- 1996: Discussions with Stanisław Lem (Dyskusje ze Stanisławem Lemem) Małgorzata Szpakowska, Warszaw
- 1997: The collection A Stanislaw Lem Reader contains two interviews of Peter Swirski with Lem:
  - "Reflections on Literature, Philosophy, and Science", personal interview, June 1992
  - "Lem in Nutshell", written interview, July 1994
- 2000: World on the Brink, interviews of Tomasz Fiałkowski with Lem
- 2002: Thus Spoke... Lem (Tako rzecze... Lem) - Stanisław Bereś
  Expanded edition of Conversations with Stanisław Lem, without censorship and expanded with the 2001 conversations.
- 2005: Patrick Grossmann, "Stanislaw Lem. 'Intelligenz ist ein Rasiermesser'", Lem's very last interview (an English translation at Lem's Fandom wiki)
- 2016: The World According to Lem (pl:Świat według Lema), Peter Swirski
  Note: During 1991-1998 Lem used this title as a running header for his articles in Tygodnik Powszechny

== Bibliographies ==
- 2010: Lech Keller: Visions of the future in the writings of Stanisław Lem, Vol. 2: "Annotated and Cross-Referenced Primary and Secondary Bibliography of Stanisław Lem", Saarbrücken: Lap Lambert, ISBN 978-3838369426
- 2006 Переводы произведений Станислава Лема на русский язык (1955—1986) [Translations of Works of Stanislaw Lem in Russian (1955-1986)], by Konstantin Dushenko, НЛО, issue 6, 2006
- 2006 Переводы произведений Станислава Лема на русский язык (1987 — 2006): отдельные издания [Translations of Works of Stanislaw Lem in Russian (1955-1986): Selected Editions], M.F. Trifonov, НЛО, issue 6, 2006
- 1997: A Stanislaw Lem Reader (edited by Peter Swirski) — includes Lem's brief bibliography
- 1986 Wolfgang Thadewald, Stanislaw Lem - Bibliographie für den deutschen Sprachraum (Bibliography of Lem's Works in the German Language) in: Florian Marzin, (ed.) Stanislaw Lem: An den Grenzen der SF und darüber hinaus Meitingen: Corian - very extensive bibliography of Lem's works published in German
