= Głos Lema =

Collection of Polish science fiction

Głos Lema (Lem's Voice (Note: An allusion to Lem's novel Głos Pana)) is a collection of Polish science fiction short stories, fanfics of Stanisław Lem. It was published by Powergraph publishing house, Warsaw, in 2011, on the occasion of the 90th anniversary of the writer. The collection is prefaced with an introduction by Jacek Dukaj.

In 2017 it was translated into Russian as Голос Лема.

== Contents ==
In the introduction Dukaj discusses a paradoxical situation (in Poland): everybody knows Lem, but nobody from the generation who grew up reading The Witcher really reads Lem, as well as the difficulties of writing "like Lem".

- Krzysztof Piskorski – "Trzynaście interwałów Iorri"
  A post-humanist hard SF about the destruction of civilization
- Rafał Orkan – "Księcia Kordiana księżycowych przypadków część pierwsza i najprawdopodobniej ostatnia"
  A humorous story akin of the Fables for Robots
- Wawrzyniec Podrzucki – "Zakres widzialny"
  About a planet that plays tricks with its discoverers, a hint to Solaris or to Eden
- Andrzej Miszczak – "Poryw"
  A spin-off of Pirx the Pilot. The story is about the difference between people and AI, set in the space.
- Alex Gütsche – "Lalka"
  In an alternative history where the Soviet Union still exists a Soviet cosmonaut meets a mysterious girl.
- Joanna Skalska –"Płomieniem jestem ja"
  Alien visitors are theated as lab rats. An alien spaceship arrives with a pregnant woman who immediately after the arrival gives birth to twin boys. All three are kept in isolation for many years, one of the reasons of this being that a large number of people see them as a threat and want them dead.
- Janusz Cyran – "Słońce Król"
- Wojciech Orliński – "Stanlemian"
  The story was translated into English in a collection Lemistry (Lem's originals and fanfics). Steve Mollmann, a co-writer of Star Trek, explains the title as follows: "The title is mean to be in opposition to "phildickian": whereas phildickian describes situations where reality is difficult to determine, stanlemian is used to describe situations where the problem has been solved." The story is about people gambling in virtual reality and the protagonist is hired by a gambler to get the money from the virtual into the real world without the knowledge of the gambler's girlfriend.
- Rafał Kosik – "Telefon"
  a technological thriller set in the everyday Polish life, a story rather remote from Lem
- Paweł Paliński – "Blask"
  A man experiences an "epiphany" due to a pink ray, which changes him.
- Filip Haka – "Opowieści kosmobotyczne Dominika Vidmara"
  a tribute to Ijon Tichy
- Jakub Nowak – "Rychu"
  The protagonist is Ryszard K. Dick (a hint to Philip K. Dick) who writes letters to FBI claiming that Slanislaw Lem does not exist. (This is a hint to a real event.)

In the Russian-language book the translations of two more stories were added:

- "Wszystkie dzieci Barbie" (2008) by Robert M. Wegner
  A psychologist goes to a space station to rescue a young woman stuck in virtual reality
- "Kto napisał Stanisława Lema?" (2008) by Jacek Dukaj
  An imitation of Stanisław Lem's fictitious criticism of nonexistent books; see this article about Dukaj's story
