= Rozmowy ze Stanisławem Lemem =

Polish written interview

Conversations with Stanisław Lem
- First edition
- Author: Stanisław Bereś
- Original title: Rozmowy ze Stanisławem Lemem
- Language: Polish
- Genre: Interview
- Published: 1987
- Publisher: Wydawnictwo Literackie
- Publication place: Poland
- Media type: Print (paperback)
- Pages: 399
- ISBN: 8308016561
- OCLC: 572265632

Thus spoke... Lem
- Author: Stanisław Bereś
- Original title: Tako rzecze… Lem
- Language: Polish
- Genre: Interview
- Published: 2002
- Publisher: Wydawnictwo Literackie
- Publication place: Poland
- Media type: Print (paperback)
- Pages: 575
- ISBN: 8308032451
- OCLC: 749598762

Rozmowy ze Stanisławem Lemem (literal translation: Conversations with Stanisław Lem) is a book-length interview of Polish science fiction writer Stanisław Lem conducted by literary critic and historian Stanisław Bereś in 1981–1982 and published in book format in 1987. The second, more comprehensive edition was published in 2002 under the title Tako rzecze... Lem (Thus Spoke... Lem). The German-language, uncensored version, Also sprach Lem, was published earlier, in 1986. (Note: The title Thus Spoke... Lem / Also sprach Lem is an allusion to Also sprach Zarathustra. Lem's 1981 book Golem XIV was translated in German same year as Also sprach GOLEM.)

== Development ==
The interview lasted a year, from November 1981 to August 1982, and was interrupted by the beginning of martial law in Poland. The book's publication was delayed as both Lem and Bereś were seen as involved with the opposition and sympathetic towards Western powers. Parts of the interview were first published in West Germany and Poland in the monthly literary magazine Odra.

The book was published in 1986 in Germany by Insel Verlag under the title Lem über Lem. Gespräche ("Lem about Lem. Conversations"). In 1987, the book was published by Polish publisher Wydawnictwo Literackie, but in a low-quality edition of 10,000 copies; furthermore, as the book was subject to significant government censorship, in particular, the parts were removed that discussed the Polish government's declaration of the martial law and the Soviet occupation of the city of Lwów, where Lem lived during his youth.

The second, expanded edition included fragments censored from the previous edition as well as a new chapter based on more recent interviews with Lem carried out by Bereś after the September 11 attacks in the United States. The title of the book was also changed to Tako rzecze… Lem (Thus spoke... Lem), an allusion to Thus Spoke Zarathustra and the title initially intended for the book.

Reviewing the second edition in 2002, Wojciech Orliński called it "the most interesting of all monographies about Lem" and a "brilliant interview".

== Content ==
The book is composed of the following chapters:

- Czas nie całkiem utracony (1987 edition title) / Czas nieutracony (2002 edition title). Lit. Time [not fully] lost. This chapter was partially censored in the 1987 edition, which have removed parts about Soviet-occupied era Lwów of WWII where Lem grew up.
- W pajęczej sieci. Lit In the spider's web.
- O Golemie osobno (1987 edition title) / Golem (2002 edition title). Lit Separately about Golem.
- Rozczarowania filmowe. Lit. Film disappointments.
- Gusta i dysgusta. Lit. Likes and dislikes.
- Księga skarg i wniosków. Lit. Book of complains and suggestions.
- W cywilizacyjnej jamie. Lit. In the cave of civilization.
- Czarna bezwyjściowość sytuacji. Lit. Black no-exits of the situation. This chapter, discussing recent events in Poland, was entirely removed by censors in the 1987 edition.
- Wyjaśniać świat. Lit. Explain the world.
- Pasja filozofowania. Lit. Passion of philosophizing.
- Lube czasy. Lit. Good times. This is one of the three new chapters added to the 2002 edition.
- Wizja lokalna. (Note: See Wizja lokalna) This is one of the three new chapters added to the 2002 edition.
- Summa, czyli panta rhei. Lit. Summa, or panta rhei. This is one of the three new chapters added to the 2002 edition.

== Influence ==
While Bereś' interview was never fully translated to English, in the early 1990s Lem met with the literary scholar and critic Peter Swirski for a series of extensive interviews, published with other critical materials and translations in English as A Stanislaw Lem Reader (1997).

In 2005 Bereś published another book-length interview, Historia i fantastyka, this time with Polish fantasy writer Andrzej Sapkowski. Wojciech Orliński in his review of Historia i fantastyka notes that comparing it with the Lem's interview from 1980s it allows for a study of how Polish science fiction and fantasy has changed over those two decades.

== See also ==
- Bibliography of Stanisław Lem#Interviews, other interviews with Lem
