= Historia i fantastyka =

Book

History and fantasy
- Author: Stanisław Bereś
- Original title: Historia i fantastyka
- Language: Polish
- Genre: Interview
- Published: 2005
- Publisher: SuperNowa
- Publication place: Poland
- Media type: Print (paperback)
- Pages: 285
- ISBN: 9788370541781
- OCLC: 67090573

Historia i fantastyka (lit. The History and The Fantasy) is a book-length interview of Polish fantasy writer Andrzej Sapkowski conducted and published in book format by Stanisław Bereś in 2005.

The book has been compared to a prior book-length interview Bereś carried out with Polish science fiction writer Stanisław Lem in the 1980s (expanded 2002 edition: Thus Spoke... Lem, Polish title Tako rzecze... Lem). Wojciech Orliński in his review of Historia i fantastyka notes that it allows a comparison on how Polish science fiction and fantasy has changed over those two decades.

In the book, Sapkowski and Bereś discuss not only Sapkowski's works and inspirations, but his views on politics, military and pacifism, religion and society, relations of history and fantasy, as well as Sapkowski's views on literature.
