= The Man from Mars =

1946 novel by Stanisław Lem

- Author: Stanisław Lem
- Original title: Człowiek z Marsa
- Translator: Peter Swirski
- Language: Polish
- Genre: Social science fiction, satire, philosophical novel
- Publication date: 1946
- Publication place: Poland

The Man from Mars (Polish: Człowiek z Marsa) is a "first contact" science fiction novel by Polish writer Stanisław Lem, published in 1946, Lem's first science fiction work. In the novel, American scientists are studying an alien found in a crashed spaceship from Mars.

== Publication history ==
It was Stanislaw Lem's first science fiction work, serialized in a Katowice weekly, Nowy Świat Przygód ("New World of Adventures") in 1946, starting in the first issue. Lem considered it extremely naive and weak; he said he wrote it exclusively "for bread", and refused to reprint it for a long time. Some Polish science fiction fanclubs produced small editions of pirated reprints. Later it was printed legally several times in Germany, where a publishing house had rights for Stanislaw Lem's juvenilia. The first legal Polish reprint, in book format, was published in 1994 by Independent Publishing House NOWA.

In 2009, a long excerpt from Chapter 1 was translated into English for the first time by Peter Swirski and published with permission of Stanislaw Lem's family in the online literary magazine Words Without Borders.

== Plot summary ==
An American reporter is accidentally forced to join a secret team of scientists who got hold of a crashed spaceship from Mars with a creature they dubbed "areanthrop" (Greek: Ares=Mars + anthropos=man) in it. The areanthrop seems to be a kind of cyborg: a sentient protoplasm which in the course of natural evolution built itself a "robotic suit", rather than developing a biological body. Scientists poke, prod and pry it with all means possible in attempts to study it. Eventually the areanthrop gives them a telepathic trip to Mars and seizes control over a member of the team, and with great difficulty it is completely destroyed.

== Literary criticism ==
Despite Lem's own critical attitude, Jerzy Jarzębski notes that The Man from Mars is a smoothly written, readable novel that keeps the reader in suspense and does not abuse the technical jargon, although it is written following standard literary recipes, unlike later Lem's works, which break conventions and are full of intellectual challenges. Wojciech Orliński seconds this opinion, remarking that after passing through some initial implausible elements (e.g., why would the military need a reporter in a top secret endeavor), the novel is quite readable.

At the same time the novel sketches a number of ideas further elaborated by Lem in other works, most notably the concept of the inherent impossibility of communication between human and non-human intelligences, best known from his novel Solaris.
