= 1 (2009 film) =

Hungarian film

- Directed by: Pater Sparrow
- Written by: Judit Góczán & Pater Sparrow
- Based on: One Human Minute by Stanislaw Lem
- Produced by: Attila Csáky; Zoltán Kamondi
- Starring: Zoltán Mucsi; László Sinkó; Pál Mácsai; Vica Kerekes; Balázs Czukor; Zoltán Balázs; Máté Haumann; Krzysztof Rogacewicz
- Cinematography: Máté Tóth Widamon
- Edited by: Wanda Kiss
- Music by: Dávid Szesztay
- Release dates: February 1, 2009 (Hungarian Film Festival); November 5, 2009 (Hungary)
- Country: Hungary
- Language: Hungarian

1 is the first feature film of Hungarian director/production designer Pater Sparrow. It was inspired by One Human Minute by Polish science fiction writer Stanisław Lem, a work of pseudepigrapha.

== Plot ==
A bookshop renowned for its rare works is mysteriously filled with copies of a book entitled 1, which doesn't appear to have a publisher or author. The strange almanac is filled with tables and statistics that describe everything that happens in the world in the course of one minute. A police investigation begins and the bookshop staff, along with a mysterious visitor from Vatican City who arrived just as the book did, are placed in solitary confinement by the Bureau for Paranormal Research (RDI - Reality Defense Institute). As the investigation progresses, the situation becomes more complex and the book increasingly well known, raising numerous controversies. Slowly, the lead investigator, Phil Pitch, begins to lose his grip on reality.

== Festivals & awards ==
- The film debuted at the 40th Hungarian Film Week where it won 5 awards: Best Cinematography, Best Editor, Best Visual Design, Best Producer, and received the Best First Feature Film award from the Student Jury.
- Also won the Hungarian Film Critics Award in 2010 for best visual achievement.
- Best Director and Best Actor for Zoltán Mucsi at the 30th Fantasporto International Film Festival.
- Best Director at the 20th Fantastic Film Festival of the University of Málaga (Fancine Málaga)
- Best Sci-Fi feature at the 5th Cinefantasy Film Festival in San Paulo.
- Audience Award at the 16th International Festival of Young Filmmakers in Granada and at the 7th Fresh Film Fest in Praha.

Official selections:

- 42nd SITGES International Film Festival of Fantastic Films / 'New Visions - Discovery' section
- Brussels International Fantastic Film Festival 'European' and '7th Orbit' competition
- The London International Festival Of Science Fiction and Fantastic Film
- Festival International du Film Policier de Liege
- Göteborg International Film Festival
- New York Lincoln Center/ Hungarian Film Festival
- SFF-rated Athens Intl Sci-Fi & Fantasy Film Festival
- Triest S+F International Film Festival.
- Bradford International Film Festival,
- Oslo International Film Festival,
- Brussels EuroCine 27 Festival
- Israel Icon Film Festival
- Ourense International Independent Film Festival
- Fantasy Montreal International Film Festival
- Montevideo Fantastic Film Festival

== Reception ==
Anton Bitel of Sight & Sound wrote: 'Enigmatic in form, encyclopedic in scope, and leaving room between its lines for many different readings, Sparrow's truly singular film encapsulates the whole of human experience in eccentric, elliptical cross-section. It is all at once science fiction, political allegory, transcendental mystery and free-form documentary, recalling the early works of Peter Greenaway in its vast referential breadth, its mannered blurring of fact and fiction, and the beauty of its tableau-like images.' Valuska László of Index praised the cinematography and the performances of Mácsai, Czukor, Kerekes, Haumann, Rogacewicz and Musci. Joshua Chaplinsky ScreenAnarchy opined that while the film is "packed to the gills with ideas", it "fails to develop any of them in a satisfying manner."
