= Veit Etzold =

German author

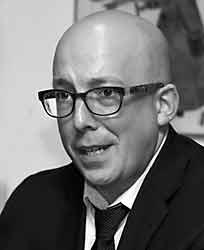
Etzold in 2012

Veit Etzold is a German author who became famous for his first fictional bestseller Final Cut in 2012 and following books such as Der Totenzeichner in 2015 or Dark Web in 2017. He is married to Saskia Etzold, a well-known forensic doctor at the Berliner Charité.

Etzold is also a university professor for marketing and corporate storytelling and in this role a commentator on developments in business and politics. He wrote several non-fictional books about strategy and storytelling such as Der weiße Hai im Weltraum in 2013 and Strategie: Planen–Erklären–Umsetzen in 2018. As a guest author for Germany's largest tabloid Bild, he formulated seven golden strategy rules when "Strategie" was published.

His fictional books are thrillers and the main protagonist is the fictional Berlin investigator Clara Vidalis, who is a chief inspector in the pathopsychology department at the Berlin State Criminal Police Office.

In 2012, Etzold launched a book series featuring the fictional Berlin investigator Clara Vidalis with the novel Final Cut. The Chief Inspector—who handles complex cases involving pathopsychology for the Berlin State Criminal Police Office (LKA Berlin)—is the protagonist of the thriller series.

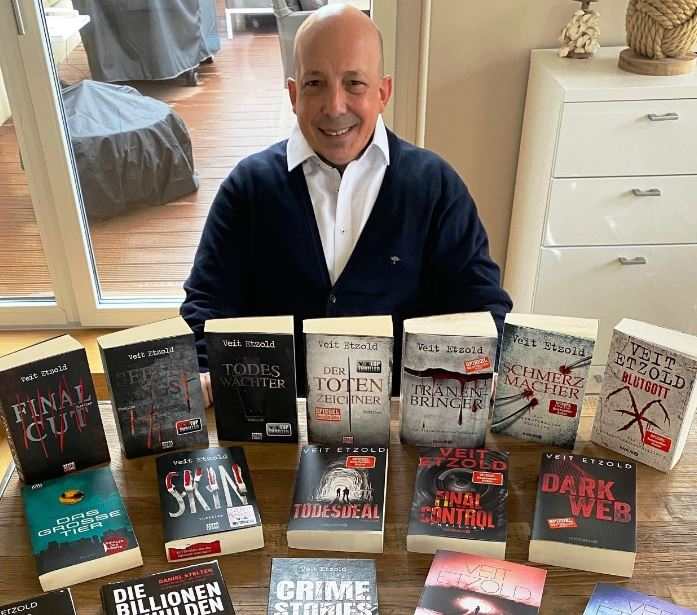
Clara Vidalis book series

== Fictional books in German (selection) ==
- Final Cut: Thriller. Bastei Lübbe, Köln 2012, ISBN 978-3-404-16687-9.
- Seelenangst: Thriller. Bastei Lübbe, Köln 2013, ISBN 978-3-404-16844-6.
- Todeswächter: Thriller. Bastei Lübbe, Köln 2014, ISBN 978-3-404-16991-7.
- Der Totenzeichner: Thriller. Bastei Lübbe, Köln 2015, ISBN 978-3-404-17229-0.
- Todesdeal: Thriller. Droemer, München 2015, ISBN 978-3-426-30434-1.
- Skin: Thriller. Bastei Lübbe, Köln 2016, ISBN 978-3-404-17375-4.
- Dark Web: Thriller. Droemer, München 2017, ISBN 978-3426305508.
- Tränenbringer: Ein Clara-Vidalis-Thriller. Knaur TB, München 2017, ISBN 978-3-426-52069-7.
- Schmerzmacher: Ein Clara-Vidalis-Thriller. Knaur TB, München 2018, ISBN 978-3-426-52112-0.
- Staatsfeind: Droemer TB, München 2019, ISBN 978-3-426-30668-0.
- Blutgott: Knaur TB, München 2020, ISBN 978-3-426-52408-4
- Final Control: Droemer TB, München 2020, ISBN 978-3-426-30709-0.
- Höllenkind: Knaur TB, München 2021, ISBN 978-3-426-52409-1.
- Die Filiale: Thriller. Droemer, München 2022, ISBN 978-3-426-30710-6.
- Die Zentrale: Allein gegen das System. Droemer, München 2023, ISBN 978-3-426-30927-8.
- Der Konzern: Allein gegen die Macht. Droemer, München 2023, ISBN 978-3-426-30934-6.
- Final Blood: Knaur TB, München 2024, ISBN 978-3-426-30935-3.
- Vollendung. Knaur TB, München 2026, ISBN 978-3-426-56620-6.
