= From Lowbrow to Nobrow =

Book on literary culture

- Author: Peter Swirski
- Subject: Literature, Cultural studies
- Publisher: McGill-Queen's University Press
- Publication date: 2005
- Pages: 224
- ISBN: 978-0-7735-2992-2
- OCLC: 60739494

From Lowbrow to Nobrow is a book on literary culture written by Peter Swirski, Canadian novelist and literary critic.

Having gone through several printings, the book is by now a staple in American popular culture studies. It furnishes a series of analyses of the relation of popular fiction to high literary culture. In his work, Swirski challenges the highbrow vs lowbrow categorization of literary culture, and popular culture in general by focusing attention on what he terms the nobrow taste culture, whereby "authors simultaneously target both extremes of the literary spectrum".

In the first half of the book, Swirski details the historical facts behind the functioning of popular fiction, and discusses the concept of genres and the nobrow aesthetics. He does this by tracing the socio-historical development of the book publishing industry and scouring the publishing statistical data from sources such as UNESCO and the American Book Industry Study Group. Supported by statistics, illustrations, and case studies, the author asks for a more serious examination of popular literature. Because of its mass appeal, critics and academics are quick to conclude that popular literature is lowbrow art. Swirski asserts that in fact some of the best works in the twentieth century come from authors who refuse to succumb to either the highbrow/academic literary formulae, or to the formulaic popular genres sold at the "bestseller-and-moccacino" bookstore chains.

He demonstrates his arguments in the second half of the book by analyzing three "nobrow" works: Karel Čapek's War With the Newts (1936), Raymond Chandler's Playback (1958), and Stanislaw Lem's The Chain of Chance (1976). All three, and many others mentioned and discussed in this book, are exemplary of the nobrow cultural formation which spans the twentieth century.

== Sources ==
- "Lowbrow, Highbrow, and the Categorization of Art", Columbia Journal of American Studies
