= Men of the Ten Books =

Science-fiction story by Jack Vance

Men of the Ten Books is a science fiction story by Jack Vance published in 1951. Also titled The Ten Books, it is about a new society on a distant Earth-like planet founded by the inhabitants of a huge intergalactic spaceship of colonists which crash-landed there. The survivors only manage to rescue a single set of books from the wreckage: an inexpensive set of encyclopaedias. Their entire knowledge of Earth’s culture and history is based on the glowing, puffery-filled descriptions in these books, which leads them to revere Earth as a perfect world.

== Plot ==
Two space explorers, Betty and Ralph Welstead, are flying to asteroids to prospect for minerals using a spaceship with a sophisticated drive-propulsion system. They discover an Earth-like planet colonized by humans who are the offspring of 60 galactic explorers from the first stage of intergalactic exploration over 250 years ago. The small number of colonists call their society "Haven". They live in “wide low cities, very different from the clanging hives of Earth”, all “under the greenery like carvings in alabaster or miraculous snowflakes”.

Betty and Ralph find the new planet seems like a utopia, with beautiful towns that are low in crime and corruption, but the inhabitants insist that the original Earth must be the true utopia, and they plead with the Welsteads to let them see the drive-propulsion system, which will help them design a spaceship so they can get back to Earth. The colonists could only save one set of books from the wreckage of the crash that marooned them: a ten-volume set called the “Encyclopedia of Human Achievement”. The books are filled with exaggerated purple prose and propaganda that makes Earth seem like a paradise. The people of Haven are driven to try to live up to the greatness of Earth, which pushes them to try to create new technologies and improve their society.

Ralph tries to convince the colonists that Earth is actually struggling with graft and government inefficiency, and that the commercial art and music typically is of mediocre quality. Ralph thinks that he and Betty should sneak off the planet before the curious Havenites can find out about the drive system, because he worries they will feel sad when they see the real Earth. Betty is more sympathetic to the colonists' wish to get back to Earth, and she tells the Mayor of their town about Ralph's scheme. She also allows one of the colony leaders to hide as a stowaway on the Welsteads' spaceship.
