= Year of Lem =

Year celebrated in Poland

The year of 2021 was declared the Year of Stanisław Lem in Poland by a resolution of the Sejm (the lower house of the parliament of Poland), passed on November 27, 2020. It assigned several patrons for the year, so 2021 was known as the Stanisław Lem Year, Stefan Wyszyński Year, Cyprian Norwid Year, Krzysztof Kamil Baczyński Year, Tadeusz Różewicz Year, as well as the Constitution of 3 May Year in Poland. 2021 is the 100th anniversary of Stanisław Lem's birth.

== History ==
A petition dated by March 11, 2020, for the declaration of the Year of Lem was submitted to Marshal of Sejm by Wydawnictwo Literackie (a major publisher of Stanisław Lem's books), the Kraków Festival Bureau, and the Stanisław Lem Poland of the Future Foundation (Polish: Fundacja Polska Przyszłości im. Stanisława Lema). President Andrzej Duda was one of the petition's supporters.

On July 11, 2020, a draft resolution was submitted to Sejm, and the final resolution was approved on November 27, 2020.

== Activities ==
The preparations for this celebration have been underway in Kraków, the city associated with Lem, for several years. These preparations include the establishment of Kraków Centre of Literature and Language "Planet Lem" intended to popularize the works of Lem and to supplement the project "Lem 2021", implemented within the UNESCO program "Kraków is the City of Literature ("Kraków Miasto Literatury").

In 2021 Wydawnictwo Literackie is planning to release a new biography of Lem by Agnieszka Gajewska of Adam Mickiewicz University in Poznań and the book Lem in PRL by Wojciech Orliński about the peripeteias of Lem in People's Republic of Poland, as well as new editions of Lem's books.

The major event will be the celebration of Lem's birthday (September 12–14) at the ICE Kraków Congress Centre. Lem will be the focus of number of regular events, such as Children's Literature Festival and Sacrum Profanum Festival, as well as in theaters, musical works, symposia and conferences. More web festivals are announced. For example, the collaboratively developed #StanislawLem Festival 2021 from 28.-31. October 2021.
