= Pál Mácsai =

Hungarian actor (born 1961)

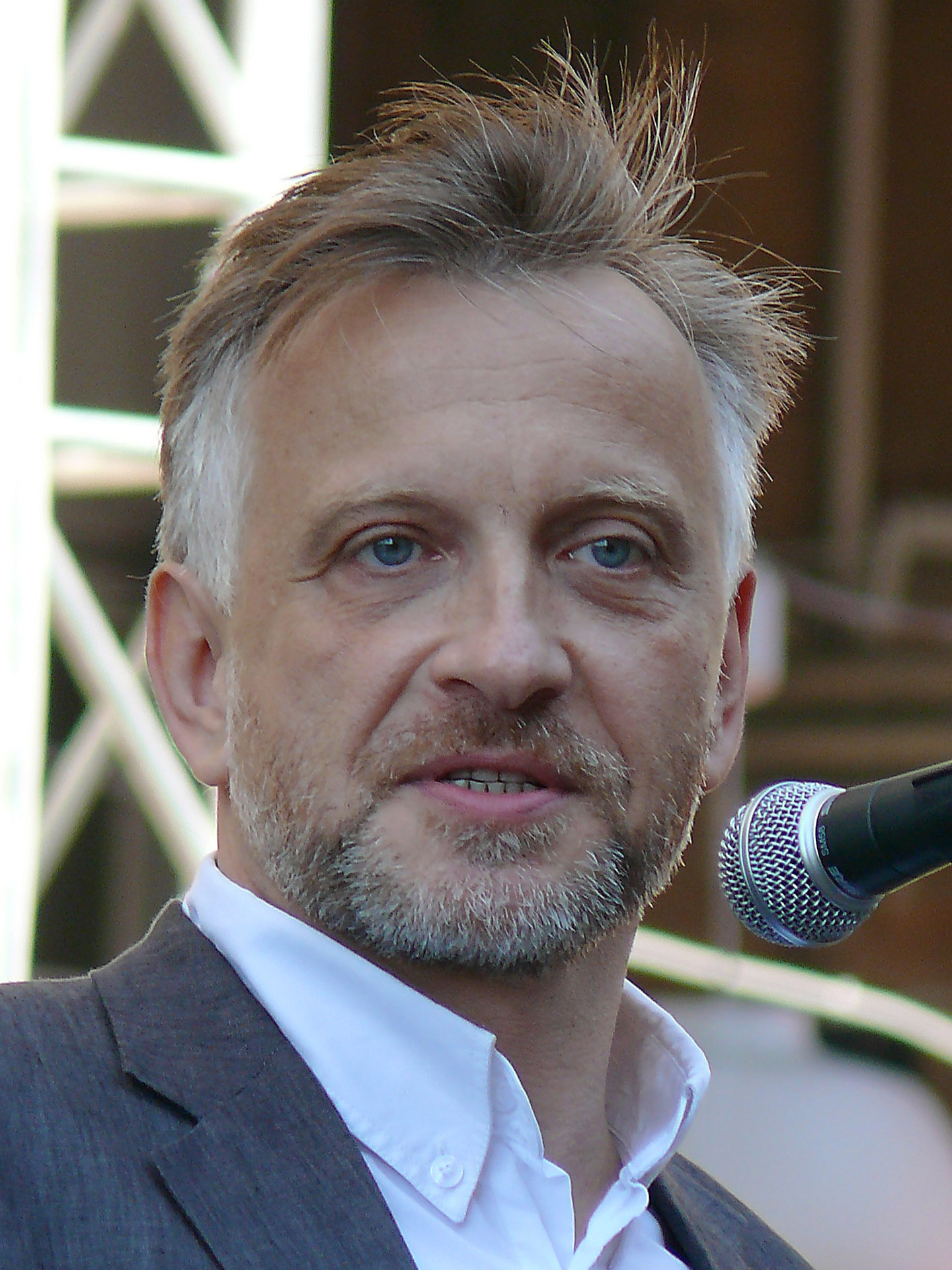
- Born: 31 March 1961 (age 65); Budapest, Hungary
- Occupation: Actor
- Years active: 1980-present

Pál Mácsai (born 31 March 1961) is a Hungarian actor. He has appeared in more than forty films since 1983.

== Selected filmography ==
Year	Title	Role	Notes
1987	Miss Arizona		
1996	Samba		
2004	The Unburied Man		
2009	1		
2017	Bye Bye Germany	Szoros	
