= Highcastle =

Noval by Stanisław Lem

Highcastle: A Remembrance (Polish: Wysoki Zamek) is a coming-of-age autobiographical novel by Polish science fiction writer Stanisław Lem. Written in 1965, it was first published in 1966 by Wydawnictwo MON.

It is a memoir of Lem's childhood and youth years spent in the interwar Lwów (then a Polish city, present-day Lviv in Ukraine), with a good deal of philosophical musing on memory, imagination, and the impact of earlier years on later life. The novel title is a reference to the ruins of Lviv High Castle.

Lem (as well as many critics) stated that the work is not a novel, in the sense that it does not have any fictional elements.

It was translated into English by Michael Kandel in 1995. In 2000, MIT Press reprinted it on the occasion of the upcoming 100th anniversary of the writer's birth in 1921.

It was also translated into Russian (1969), German (1974), Bulgarian (1985), Ukrainian (2002) and Croatian (2026).
