= A Perfect Vacuum =

Book by Lem

- First edition cover by Andrzej Heidrich
- Author: Stanisław Lem
- Translator: Michael Kandel
- Subject: Fictitious criticism of nonexisting books
- Published: 1971 (Polish)
- Publisher: Czytelnik Publishing House

A Perfect Vacuum (Polish: Doskonała próżnia) is a 1971 book by Polish author Stanisław Lem, the largest and best known collection of Stanisław Lem's fictitious criticism of nonexisting books. It was translated into English by Michael Kandel. Some of the reviews remind the reader of drafts of his science fiction novels, some read like philosophical pieces across scientific topics, from cosmology to the pervasiveness of computers, finally others satirize and parody everything from the nouveau roman to pornography, Ulysses, authorless writing, and Dostoevsky.

== Contents ==
The book contains reviews of 16 imaginary books and one real book: itself.

- A Perfect Vacuum: review of the book itself. This is the only real book reviewed in the entire collection. However, even this is not entirely real. For example, the reviewer criticizes the preface of A Perfect Vacuum, entitled Auto-Momus, even though the actual A Perfect Vacuum does not have a preface or a section titled Auto-Momus.
- Les Robinsonades: A Robinsonade wherein the marooned sailor copes with his solitude by attempting to create an orderly world purely within his imagination - a task doomed to failure.
- Gigamesh: The novel Gigamesh is to the Gilgamesh legend what James Joyce's Ulysses is to Homer's The Odyssey. The novel superficially describes the last 36 minutes of the life of “GI Joe” Maesch, as he awaits his execution. To this 395-page-long novel was appended a 847-page-long commentary that performs an extremely detailed exegesis on the novel, revealing that it was actually an attempt to compress the entire knowledge of humanity into one novel ("the letter M in “GigaMesh,” for instance, directs us to the history of the Mayans, to the god Vitzi-Putzli, to the entire Aztec cosmogony, and also their irrigation system"). While scholars took joy in exegesizing Joyce, the author of Gigamesh did it all by himself.
- The Sexplosion: a sci-fi novel about the total liberation of sexual desires, followed by the total extinction of the sex drive, and then an eroticization of food, where certain methods of highly elaborate eating are treated as if they are erotic, while others are taboo ("it is not permitted to eat spinach or scrambled eggs with one’s feet propped up").
- Gruppenführer Louis XVI: A historical fiction about how an ex-Nazi escaped to Argentina and recreated the pre-Revolutionary French Court in the jungle, and how the actors he hired gradually grew into their roles such that they continued maintaining the French court facade even after the death of the ex-Nazi.
- Rien du tout, ou la consequence: A novel written entirely in negations ("The train did not arrive. He did not come."). A parody of the Nouveau roman literary movement.
- Pericalypsis: A polemical book that argues that there are already too many books written, that these constitute information pollution, and it would be better to destroy all books written after 1900 in order that the real gems would not be buried. Further, a global organization must be set up to punish anyone who publishes for money and fame. Instead of publishing, such people should send their works to the organization, and if their work was found to be of potential commercial success, they would be given a stipend in exchange for not publishing the work.
- Idiota: A review of a novel that subtly criticizes The Idiot. In the novel, a family of three consisted of a mother, a father, and an idiot son. The idiot son caused them many troubles, but the parents kept up an act and reinterpreted everything he did to deny the fact that their son was an idiot. The subtle criticism is that in The Idiot, the protagonist was just like the idiot in this story – an idiot.
- U-Write-It: A literary erector set. It gives the reader blank pages and strips containing fragments of great novels and orders the reader to re-arrange them at will. Similar to the cut-up technique used by the Dadaists and William S. Burroughs. The literary erector set didn't sell well, as the general public was actually uninterested in great novels.
- Odysseus of Ithaca: A novel about Odysseus of Ithaca (a small fictional town in Massachusetts), who started an organization to search for lost geniuses. He theorized that there are 3 levels of geniuses. Level 3 are those that are recognized in their lifetime, and can often achieve fame and success. Level 2 are those that are so ahead of their times and so disruptive that they were often persecuted and only rediscovered centuries later. Level 1 are those that could change the course of history, if they were listened to. But if they were not, then they would no longer be relevant, since human history would have marched on too far to turn towards the direction they pointed out.
- Toi: A novel composed in the context of one trend in modern literature: a search for authenticity by refusing to make a polished, closed, fictional world, but expose the author's composing process ("one writes a book about how one essays to write a book about the wish to write a book, and so on."). This novel, instead of retreating further into the author in order to be "authentic", mounts a frontal attack by insulting the reader. It fails because insults are only effective if they are tailored to the receiver.
- Being Inc.: A sci-fi novel that portrays the world as the result of elaborate computer planning of individual lives, a huge choreography of humanity. One could purchase life events, such as "saving a life in a train wreck" from Being Inc. However, due to the Antimonopoly Law in America, there were three companies, and when they were required to produce incompatible events, trouble ensued. The end result was that the computers started planning even the activities of the companies themselves, and each company was infiltrated by agents from the other companies.
- Die Kultur Als Fehler, or 'Civilization as a mistake': a philosophical book that argues that human culture is a defense mechanism to give meaning to humanity's frailties and weaknesses, by claiming they are part of a larger plan of things. Now that technological progress has allowed radical human enhancement, some people oppose that – consciously or not, because it would mean that all the previous suffering has been unnecessary and technology is our saviour.
- De Impossibilitate Vitae and De Impossibilitate Prognoscendi ("On the Impossibility of Life" and "On the Impossibility of Prognostication"): two books reviewed in one review, both dealing with alternative history. This pseudoreview was published in English under the title Odds in 1978 in The New Yorker.

The former consists almost entirely of tracking all the things that must have happened for the author (Kouska) to have been born: his father must have married his mother, which in turn depended on them meeting during the War, which in turn depended on multitude of other events. Here Lem argues for the butterfly effect: changing one thing has an almost infinite number of unimaginable consequences. De Impossibilitate Vitae is a fictionalized piece of Lem's own biography.
The latter is an argument that futurology cannot be based on the probability theory, but rather of some other approach, quoting Lem: "namely, to quote Kouska, 'theory, based on antipodal axioms, of the distribution of ensembles in actual fact unparalleled in the space-time continuum of higher-order events.' (The quotation also serves to show that the reading of the work, in the theoretical sections, does present certain difficulties.)"
Professor Kouska is the namesake of "Kouska's fallacy" in reasoning about concurrent happening of two highly improbable real-life events: in calculating of the probability of such a happening it is fallacious to assume that they are independent.

- Non Serviam: Is an elaborate satire of the idea of artificial intelligence that gets to the heart of the moral dilemma that true success would create. It is written in the dry style of a book review that might appear in a broad scientific journal sometime in the near future. It discusses the book, Non Serviam, by Professor James Dobb, and through this the field of "personetics", the simulated creation of truly intelligent beings ("personoids") inside a computer. It starts with a quote that "[personetics is] the cruelest science man ever created." Lem has the erudite reviewer describe the general theory of personetics, the history and state of the art, and some of the consequences, liberally quoting the work of experts in the field. Later the reviewer quotes from the book a discussion that Dobb recorded in which a personoid philosopher, ADAN. considers what he might owe his (unknown) creator. It is clear that this personoid believes he has free will (and so can say, "non serviam", i.e. I choose not to serve). It closes by quoting Dobb's expressed dilemma in having to eventually bring this world to an end. This pseudreview also appeared, in a slightly different form, under the title The Experiment, in 1978 in The New Yorker.

The translation of the faux review of Non Serviam was included into the 1981 collection of essays The Mind's I.

- The New Cosmogony: review of a fictional oration by a Nobel Prize laureate, who presents a new model of the universe based on his analysis to the Fermi Paradox: the laws of physics is the result of a game played by the Players: advanced ancient civilizations. The basic strategy for the Players is to keep the game stable, so that nobody might gain a decisive advantage. They play to not lose. Since they could not communicate, they played minimax strategies, and since the game is essentially the same to all of them, they ended up playing the same strategies. This got them into a Nash equilibrium that they were trying to preserve.
  - The expansion of the universe: to make sure that new civilizations are all isolated, so that they cannot disturb the Nash equilibrium.
  - The finiteness of light speed: to prevent domination and coalition.
  - The direction of time: so that other Players cannot undo previous actions.

== Reception ==
- "Lem is Harpo Marx and Franz Kafka and Isaac Asimov rolled up into one and down the white rabbit's hole." (The Detroit News)
- "[Lem is] a Jorge Luis Borges for the Space Age, who plays in earnest with every concept of philosophy and physics, from free will to probability theory." (The New York Times)
- "One of the most intelligent, erudite and comic writers working today." Anthony Burgess (The Observer)

== Influences ==
The 2008 edition of the book printed by Agora SA contained a supplement by Jacek Dukaj titled Who Wrote Stanisław Lem?, nominated for the 2009 Janusz A. Zajdel Award. It is a faux review of a book published in 2071, the book being a discussion of the activities of artificial intelligences, which simulated Stanisław Lem. In fact, Dukaj maintained a column of faux reviews, Alternative Bookstore ("Księgarnia alternatywna") in Polish magazine Science Fiction (from #14 (04/2002) to #33 (12/2003)). In an interview he claimed that it was not an intended continuation of Lem's work; rather he had a number of ideas he did not have time to develop in full.

The collection Lemistry: A Celebration of the Work of Stanislaw Lem (2011) contains two more tributes to Lem of this kind. "'Every Little Helps' by Frank Cottrell Boyce, reviewed by Stanisław Lem" by Frank Cottrell-Boyce is a pretend Lem's review of a nonexistent Boyce's story. "The Apocrypha of Lem by Dan Tukagawa, J. B. Krupsky, and Aaron Orvits, reviewed by Jacek Dukaj" is a faux review of a book about the literary works (and legal wrangles) of three post hominem Lems (postLems), which are three different posthumous computer simulations of Lem based on different principles.

== Bibliography ==
- Stanisław Lem, A Perfect Vacuum, Northwestern University Press, 1999, ISBN 0-8101-1733-9
