= List of imaginary books =

Book that only exists within a work of fiction

An imaginary book or fictional book is a book which "traditionally exist only within secondary worlds" of works of fiction, where it can fulfill various functions and may "act as keystones to the structure of both the stories and the worlds in which they appear."

== List of notable imaginary books ==
- The Necronomicon in H. P. Lovecraft's books serves as a repository of recondite and evil knowledge in many of his works and the work of others. Despite the evident tongue-in-cheek origin of the book, supposedly written by the "Mad Arab Abdul al-Hazred", who was supposed to have died by being torn apart by an invisible being in an Arab marketplace in broad daylight, many have been led to believe that the book is real.
- The Princess Bride by "S. Morgenstern" is presented as a long and tedious book written by a "Florinese" author in William Goldman's The Princess Bride: S. Morgenstern's Classic Tale of True Love and High Adventure, The "Good Parts" Version.
- The Grasshopper Lies Heavy is a mysterious and forbidden book important to the story of Philip K. Dick's The Man in the High Castle, written by the title character (Hawthorne Abendsen). Dick's book describes an alternate history where the Axis powers were victorious in World War II and the United States has been divided between Japan and Nazi Germany. The book-within-a-book is an alternate history itself, depicting a world in which the Allies won the war but which is nonetheless different from our own world in several important respects. Towards the end of the story, Abendsen admits to writing The Grasshopper Lies Heavy under the direction of the I Ching (which influenced The Man in the High Castle as well).
- Fictional books and authors figure prominently in several short stories by the Argentine author Jorge Luis Borges. A few of Borges's fictional creations include The Book of Sand, Herbert Quain (author of April March, The Secret Mirror, etc.), Ts'ui Pen (author of The Garden of Forking Paths), Mir Bahadur Ali (author of The Approach to Al-Mu'tasim), as well as the imaginary Encyclopædia Britannica of the story "Tlön, Uqbar, Orbis Tertius". In "Pierre Menard, Author of the Quixote", a fictional poet named Pierre Menard attempts to recreate Don Quixote exactly as Miguel de Cervantes wrote it.
- Anthony Powell included over thirty fictional books in A Dance to the Music of Time, among them Fields of Amaranth, Match Me Such Marvel, Dust Thou Art, The Heart is Highland, Never to the Philistines, E'en the Longest River, and Mimosa, all works of fiction by fictional author, St. John Clarke; Camel Ride to the Tomb, Death Head's Swordsman and Profiles in String by the fictional author X Trapnel; and Pistons as Engine Melody by the character Kenneth Widmerpool. Writing about Powell's fictional books, Robin Bynoe notes that there is a fictional bookcase of these works in the Powell papers.
- William Boyd includes the fictional novel, The Girl Factory, by Logan Mountstuart in his 2002 novel, Any Human Heart.
- Stanislaw Lem wrote several books containing methods and ideas similar to Jorge Luis Borges's fiction. Between One Human Minute and A Perfect Vacuum, he reviews 19 fictional books (and one fictional lecture). In Imaginary Magnitude, there are several introductions to fictional works, as well as an advertisement for a fictional encyclopedia entitled Vestrand's Extelopedia in 44 Magnetomes.
- In Chuck Palahniuk's Lullaby, the characters are searching for all the remaining copies of the book Poems and Rhymes Around the World, which contains a poem that can kill anyone who hears it spoken or has it thought in their direction.
- The text of Mark Z. Danielewski's novel House of Leaves consists largely of the fictional book The Navidson Record by Zampanò (possibly based on Jorge Luis Borges), and commentary upon it by its discoverer and editor Johnny Truant. The Navidson Record is itself an academic critique of an apparently nonexistent or fictional documentary film of the same name, which may or may not exist in the world of House of Leaves.
- Bill Watterson placed fictional children's books in his comic strip Calvin and Hobbes, saying that he could never reveal their contents for they were surely more outrageous in the reader's imagination. For several years, Calvin (perpetually six years old) demands that his father read him Hamster Huey and the Gooey Kablooie as a bedtime story. Occasionally, his father's patience snaps and he introduces new variations, which at least reveal what the original story is not: "Do you think the townsfolk will ever find Hamster Huey's head?" An "actual" Hamster Huey book was written by Mabel Barr in 2004, years after the strip's conclusion.
- The Encyclopedia Galactica in Isaac Asimov's Foundation series was created in Terminus at the beginning of the Foundation Era. It serves primarily as an introduction to a character, a place or a circumstance to be developed in each chapter. Each quotation contains a copyright disclaimer and cites Terminus as the place of publication. The Encyclopedia also makes an appearance in The Hitchhiker's Guide to the Galaxy by Douglas Adams.
- The Hitchhiker's Guide to the Galaxy features a fictional electronic guide book of the same name. The fictional book serves as "the standard repository for all knowledge and wisdom" for many members of the series' galaxy-spanning civilization.
- The Magicians and its sequels, written by Lev Grossman, feature a fictional series Fillory and Further by fictional writer Christopher Plover. The series remain a major theme and a reference point throughout The Magicians trilogy, even when the characters arrive in actual Fillory.
- The Book of Counted Sorrows is a book invented by horror author Dean Koontz to add verisimilitude to some of his novels. "Quotations" from this fictional book were often used to set the tone of chapters of the novels. Koontz ultimately published a version of the book.
- The work and life of the elusive German novelist Benno von Archimboldi (a fictional character) is central to two of the five parts of 2666, the last novel written by Roberto Bolaño.
- Juan de Mairena is an apocryphal author, invented by the Spanish poet Antonio Machado. According to Machado, Juan de Mairena is the author of several books about aesthetic theory, one of which is called Arte Poética (Poetic Art). Machado devotes several essays to analyze the aesthetic ideas exposed by Mairena in Arte Poética.
- An imaginary book called The Nine Gates of the Kingdom of Shadows is the central MacGuffin in the movie The Ninth Gate, based on Arturo Pérez-Reverte's novel The Club Dumas. This book was purportedly written in Venice in 1666, printed with nine woodcut engravings copied from the apocryphal Delomelanicon, a book purportedly written by the Devil himself. It is said to contain knowledge to summon the Devil and assume great power. At the start of the film, three copies are known to survive after the author and his works were burned in 1667.
- The Dynamics of an Asteroid is a fictional book by Professor James Moriarty, the implacable foe of Sherlock Holmes, in the fiction of Arthur Conan Doyle. Its intent was to show the professor's intellect by containing mathematics so esoteric it could hardly be criticized.
- An imaginary book called The Lectitio Divinitatus is the basis of the Imperial Cult in Warhammer 40,000
- An imaginary book called The Theory and Practice of Oligarchical Collectivism, written by Emmanuel Goldstein, is featured in the novel Nineteen Eighty-Four by George Orwell.

== See also ==
- List of spurious works of fiction
- List of fictional diaries
- Found manuscript
- Story within a story
