= Ars Americana Ars Politica =

2010 book by Peter Swirski

- Author: Peter Swirski
- Subject: American Literature, Culture, History and Politics
- Publisher: McGill-Queen's University Press
- Publication date: 2010
- Pages: 221
- ISBN: 978-0-7735-3766-8
- OCLC: 648097211

Ars Americana, Ars Politica: Partisan Expression in Contemporary American Literature and Culture is a 2010 critical study by Peter Swirski.

The book examines contemporary American political literature and culture in the context of American politics and history. It examines not only the partisan credentials of what it argues is a new brand of art engagé, but also the "nobrow" style in which it conducts its political business.

The principal examples of American literature that Swirski discusses in detail are: Irving Wallace’s The Man (1964), Richard Condon’s Death of a Politician (1978), P.J. O’Rourke’s Parliament of Whores (1991; 2003), Warren Beatty’s script and film Bulworth (1998), and Michael Moore’s Stupid White Men... and Other Sorry Excuses for the State of the Nation (2002; 2004). Each is selected because political partisanship is a part of its artistic agenda. As Swirski remarks in the introduction, the political art discussed in Ars Americana “should come equipped with shock-absorbers”.

Nominated for a dozen major awards, the work was touted by Howard Zinn as “fascinating and original”.
