= A Stanislaw Lem Reader =

Collection of writings by and about Polish science fiction writer Stanisław Lem

- Author: Stanisław Lem
- Translator: Peter Swirski
- Language: Polish
- Genre: Social science fiction, satire, philosophical novel
- Publication date: 1997-11-12
- Publication place: Poland
- Pages: 129
- ISBN: 978-0810114951

A Stanislaw Lem Reader is a collection of writings by and about Polish science fiction writer Stanisław Lem, one of the world's most widely read science-fiction writers. The book comprises an introduction by Canadian literary scholar Peter Swirski, two interviews by Swirski with Lem, and Swirski's translation of Lem's essay, "30 Years Later".

== Contents ==
The book is described as an "eclectic collection" on its back cover. It begins with Swirski's introduction titled "Stanislaw Lem: A Stranger in a Strange Land", an overview of Lem's literary work. The title is an allusion to Robert Heinlein's Stranger in a Strange Land, stressing the uniqueness of Lem's original perceptions of the contemporary civilization, his aesthetics and philosophy. Peter Butko described this overview as "condensed and insightful".

The second item is "Reflections on Literature, Philosophy, and Science", a personal interview of Swirski with Lem carried out in 1992, mostly focused on Lem's views on literature.

The third item is 30 Years Later, Swirski's translation of Lem's essay Trzydzieści lat później first published in Polish popular science magazine Wiedza i Życie ("Knowledge and Life") in 1991. It is the second afterword (After the "Twenty Years Later") to Lem's Summa Technologiae. Apart from the critical remarks on futurology, its significant part is the discussion of the technology of virtual reality predicted in Summa Technologiae under the term fantomatyka ("fantomatics"), a part of his bitter philosophical dispute with Polish philosopher Leszek Kołakowski. Lem also discusses which of his futurological predictions came true.

The fourth item, "Lem in Nutshell", is Swirski's written interview with Lem carried out in 1994, mostly focused on Lem's views on science and philosophy.

Comparing the second and fourth chapters (interviews), Butko notes that the "first is less formal and more conversational", while the second one is "deeper" and more scholarly. Unlike Jurich, who thinks the first interview was more focused on literature, and second more on science and philosophy, Butko concludes that both interviews have a similar focus on "the relationship of literature with philosophy and science".

The book concludes with the bibliography section. It lists Lem's books, published both in Polish and English, and articles and essays translated into English – in the chronological order of first publications. It also includes a comprehensive list of critical literature on Lem in English – alphabetically ordered by author.

== Reviews ==
The book was positively reviewed by Butko, who concluded that "Swirski's book is small in volume, but dense in ideas [and] is indispensable reading for any Stanislaw Lem reader." Jurich was more critical, noting that while the book gives English readers "the opportunity to discover aspects of Lem not otherwise accessible [to those who do not read Polish]" it is also "far more frustrating than it is interesting or significantly informative", arguing that the book provides "too little insight into Lem's thought and art."

== See also ==
- Rozmowy ze Stanisławem Lemem, a Polish-language in-depth book-length interview with Lem
- Bibliography of Stanisław Lem#Interviews, other interviews with Lem
