= Summa Technologiae =

1964 book by Stanisław Lem

- First edition
- Author: Stanisław Lem
- Cover artist: Daniel Mróz
- Language: Polish
- Publisher: Wydawnictwo Literackie
- Publication date: 1964
- Publication place: Poland
- English publication date: 2013
- Pages: 448
- ISBN: 978-0816675777

Summa Technologiae (the Latin-language title translates as "Summa (Compendium) of Technology") is a 1964 book by Polish author Stanisław Lem. Summa is one of the first collections of philosophical essays by Lem. Its name alludes to Summa Theologiae by Thomas Aquinas.

== Description ==
Paraphrasing the author, the book tries to "examine the thorns of roses that have not flowered yet"—in other words, to deal with problems of the remote (and in some cases, not so remote) future. The primary question Lem treats in the book is that of civilization in the absence of limitations, both technological and material. He also looks at moral-ethical and philosophical consequences of future technologies.

Despite its age and a number of inaccuracies in specific domains (e.g., mathematics, biology, sociology), the book has lost no momentum in the past years. Among the themes that Lem discusses in the book and that were completely in the realm of science fiction then, but are gaining importance today, are virtual reality (Lem calls it "phantomatics"), theory of search engines ("ariadnology", after Ariadne's thread), technological singularity, molecular nanotechnology ("molectronics"), cognitive enhancement ("cerebromatics"), artificial intelligence ("intellectronics").

In the preface to the first edition Lem mentions the crucial role of Iosif Shklovsky's popular science monograph Вселенная, жизнь, разум (English: Universe, Life, Intelligence; Moscow, USSR Academy of Sciences Publisher, 1962) in shaping the Summae.

In 1996 the book received the award of the Czech Academy of Science Fiction, Fantasy and Horror (Akademie science fiction, fantasy a hororu) in the category "Nonfiction titles" ("Titul mimo beletrii").

== Contents ==
The book has eight chapters, each dealing with far-fetched implications of a certain concept:

1. Dilemmas
Lem starts by presenting his views on future prognostication and motivations in writing the book.
2. Two Evolutions
This chapter considers similarities between several evolutions: biological, technological and social.
3. Space Civilizations
An overview of contemporary (to the book) SETI efforts and theories is given, with their criticism.
4. Intellectronics
A word coined by Lem to speculate on the field that is known today as artificial intelligence: The day will come when machine intelligence will rival or surpass the human one. Moreover, problems facing humankind may surpass the intellectual abilities of flesh and blood researchers. What shall we expect (or fear) in this conception of the future?
5. Prolegomena to Omnipotence
Technological evolution gives us more and more abilities—in fact, sometime in the future we should be able to do everything at all! Or maybe not?

6. Phantomology
Another term invented by Lem for what is known now as virtual reality. Human perception is limited by biology—so maybe we can bypass the real omnipotence in favor of an imitated one? Even in this case, Lem finds many surprising problems.
Lem revisited this section in 1991 in his essay "Thirty Years Later", translated in the book A Stanislaw Lem Reader. Many of the predictions from this section are coming to reality.
7. Creation of the Worlds
May it be that instead of painstaking research we can "grow" new information from available information in an automatic way? Starting with this question Lem evolves the concept to the creation of whole new Universes, including (as a special treat) the construction of a heaven/hell/afterlife enabled one.
8. Pasquinade on Evolution
Biological evolution did a rather lousy job designing humans and other animals. Can engineers do better?

The first edition also contained:

9. Art and Technology
(Polish: Sztuka i technologia.) After Leszek Kołakowski severely criticised the chapter, it was removed in later editions, both Polish and foreign. In 1988 Lem remarked that during the time past the subject had gained it its actuality.

The 4th, expanded edition (1984) contains an additional essay:

Afterword. 20 Years Later.

In 1991 Lem wrote yet another afterword, Thirty Years Later, published separately and translated in A Stanislaw Lem Reader.

== English translations ==
The book was originally published in Polish.

- Lem, Stanisław (2013). Summa technologiae. Minneapolis: University of Minnesota Press. ISBN 978-0816675760., first complete English translation; translated by Joanna Zylinska
- Chapter I "Dilemmas" and fragments of chapters II "Two Evolutions", IV "Intellectronics" and VI "Pasquil on the Evolution" had earlier been translated by Frank Prengel.

== See also ==
- Science Fiction and Futurology, another Lem book on the topic.
