= Stanisław Lem's fictitious criticism of nonexistent books =

Faux reviews of fictional books

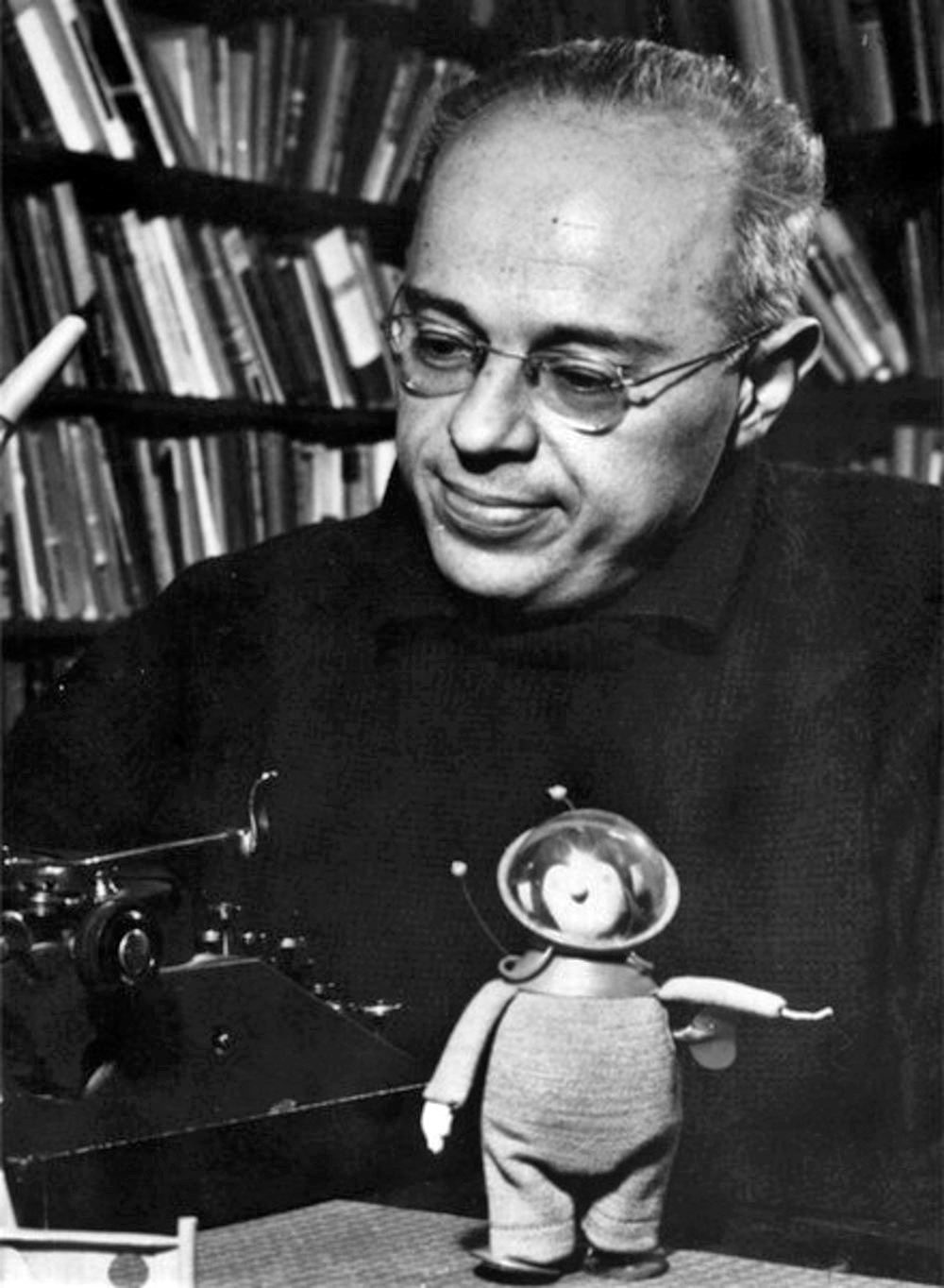
Stanisław Lem pictured at a typewriter in 1966

Stanisław Lem's fictitious criticism of nonexistent books may be found in his following works: in three collections of faux reviews of fictional books: A Perfect Vacuum (Doskonała próżnia, 1971), Provocation (Prowokacja, 1984), and Library of 21st Century (Biblioteka XXI wieku, 1986) translated as One Human Minute, and in Imaginary Magnitude (Wielkość Urojona, 1973), a collection of introductions to nonexistent books.

While reviewing nonexistent books, a modern form of pseudepigraphy, Stanisław Lem attempted to create different fictional reviewers and authors for each of the books. In his own words: "I tried to imitate various styles – that of a book review, a lecture, a presentation, a speech (of a Nobel Prize laureate) and so on". Some of the reviews are lighthearted, concentrating mostly on the story; others, however, read more like serious, academic reviews. Some of the reviews are parodies, or the books being reviewed are parodies or complete impossibilities, others are quite serious and can be seen almost as drafts for novels that Lem never got around to write. Lem wrote: "With years passing a great impatience grew in me. It would be a hard work to convert ideas into narration, and that was one of the main reasons I went for such cruel abridgements of the books". Lem was not alone in passing through this kind of crisis: examples abound of works planned by literary celebrities, but never completed. Lem also remarked that he was eventually convinced that writing summaries and introductions enabled him to save time on producing things of importance, namely, his modeling experiments, compared to full-blown literary efforts, most of which would have constituted mundane craftsmanship.

== A Perfect Vacuum ==
A Perfect Vacuum (Polish: Doskonała próżnia) is a 1971 book by Polish author Stanisław Lem, the largest and best known collection of Stanislaw Lem's fictitious criticism of nonexistent books. It was translated into English by Michael Kandel. Some of the reviews remind the reader of drafts of his science-fiction novels, some read like philosophical pieces across scientific topics, from cosmology to the pervasiveness of computers, finally others satirise and parody everything from the nouveau roman to pornography, Ulysses, "authorless writing", and Dostoevsky.

The 2008 edition of the book printed by Agora SA contained a supplement by Jacek Dukaj titled Who Wrote Stanisław Lem?, nominated for the 2009 Janusz A. Zajdel Award. It is a faux review of a book published in 2071, the book being a discussion of the activities of artificial intelligences which simulated Stanisław Lem. In fact, Dukaj maintained a column of faux reviews, Alternative Bookstore ("Księgarnia alternatywna") in Polish magazine Science Fiction (from #14 (04/2002) to #33 (12/2003)). In an interview he claimed that it was not an intended continuation of Lem's work; rather he had a number of ideas he didn't have time to develop in full. Some critics asserted that the latter reason was behind Lem's pseudepigraphy as well. When this opinion was brought to Lem's attention, he denied that.

The Agora SA edition also contained the "Glossary of Lem's Terminology" ("Słownik terminów Lemowskich") based on the book Co to są sepulki? Wszystko o Lemie (2007) by Wojciech Orliński.

== Imaginary Magnitude ==
In 1973 Lem published a book Wielkość urojona, a collection of introductions to books supposedly to be written in the future, in the 21st century. One of those Lem eventually developed into a book by itself: Golem XIV is a lengthy essay on the nature of intelligence, delivered by the eponymous US military computer.

In 1985 Wielkość Urojona was published in English by Harvest Books under the title Imaginary Magnitude, a literal mistranslation of the Polish term which actually means "delusion of grandeur", to which Lem himself did not object. The translation book included the complete Golem XIV.

Imaginary Magnitude differed from the previous book, A Perfect Vacuum, by a more serious tone, and probably therefore it did not enjoy the same kind of enthusiasm from the readers.

== Provocation and One Human Minute ==
=== Publications ===
Provocation (Prowokacja, 1984) contains two faux reviews:

- "Provocation", for a faux two-volume work by Horst Aspernicus: Der Völkermord. ["Genocide"] I. Die Endlösung als Erlösung. ("The Final Solution as Salvation") II. Fremdkörper Tod ["Foreign Body Death"], Göttingen, 1980.
- "One Minute", for a faux book by J. Johnson and S. Johnson: One human minute, Moon Publishers, London - Mare Imbrium - New York 1985.

The review "Provocation" was first published in magazine Odra in 1980 issue 7/8, pp. 12–27. Both reviews were first published as a book in 1981 (ISBN 3518017403), in German language, by Suhrkamp Verlag as Provokation in its Suhrkamp Library series.

Biblioteka XXI wieku, [ Library of 21st Century], 1986 contains three faux reviews,

- "Das kreative Vernichtungsprinzip. The World as Holocaust" ("The Creative Extermination Principle. The World as Holocaust")
- "Weapon Systems of The Twenty First Century or The Upside-down Evolution"
  It was first published in German in 1983 as a chapbook titled "Waffensysteme des 21. Jahrhunderts oder The Upside Down Evolution"
  It elaborates the idea of the "necroevolution" described in the novel The Invincible.
  In Chapter 2 of Lem's Peace on Earth, Ijon Tichy reads this book, and the corresponding piece is a nearly verbatim copy of a part of its faux review here.
  Dr. Sarah Davies reviews "The Upside-down Evolution" in her essay "Of Insects and Armies" in the collection Lemistry
- "One Minute", the same as in Provocation

Biblioteka.. was translated as One Human Minute by Catherine S. Leach ( Harcourt Brace Jovanovich, 1986 ISBN 978-0-15-169550-8; Mariner Books, 1986, ISBN 015668795X)

=== Provocation ===
This fictitious work of Aspernicus is the presentation of a certain historiographical hypothesis about the roots of genocide and the role of death, especially mass murder in human culture. Lem wrote that some historians took the quite voluminous review of Aspernicus for real and tried to order the non-existing book, and one person even claimed he had the Aspernicus' book at home, despite the fact that Lem dropped a hint by dating the review by a year ahead of the book publication date. Grzegorz Niziołek in The Polish Theatre of the Holocaust commented on Provocation as follows:

"Stanislaw Lem described the threatricity of the Holocaust in shocking terms, including its connections with eschatological forms of Christian pageant - drawing attention to the libidinal aspect of the Holocaust and to the excess of the spectacle written into it. [...] The killing of people on an industrial scale devoid of precedent produced, according to Lem, a void in the experience of those who took part in it. This void was taken over by tacky notions of eschatological spectacle. Theatre turned out to be the phenomenon of European culture that enabled loss of experience to be made up for; it became a remedy for the inability to outlive the events in which one had taken part. Theatrical kitsch, so Lem explains, had crept into the 'dramaturgy of conveyor-belt murder, although no one had intended this'"

=== One Human Minute ===
The reviewed faux book is alleged to be a collection of statistical tables, a compilation that includes everything that happens to human life on the planet within any given 60 second period. Reviewing it, Lem expresses his fascination with this project and points out its inherent flaw. He notes that these tables show "far more statistical evidence of human evil (murders, rapes, starving children) than of human decency". At the same time he remarks that it is impossible to measure "filial or maternal love", or to "gauge the heat of lovers' passions", or to register "those acts of kindness whose authors wished to remain anonymous."

In 2009, the Hungarian film director Pater Sparrow released the film 1, based on One Human Minute.

Lem's One Human Minute and Harry Mathews’s The Chronogram for 1998 inspired Nick Montfort, associate professor of digital media in Comparative Media Studies/Writing at MIT, to create a novel World Clock which was generated using 165 lines of Python code (http://nickm.com/code/world_clock.py). "It celebrates the industrial concept of time and certain types of vigorous banality which are shared by all people throughout the world.".

== Stupidity as the Driving Force of History ==
In a 1991 interview Lem mentioned a possible title of a nonexistent book, Stupidity as the Driving Force of History. The idea is that stupidity in an ordinary man is basically harmless for humankind. However stupidity of a major historical person has a tragic effect on the course of human history. And this, in Lem's view, can be observed at the roots of many tragic events of the past.

== See also ==
- Jorge Luis Borges
  - "Pierre Menard, Author of the Quixote"
  - "An Examination of the Work of Herbert Quain"
- Nazi Literature in the Americas, reviews of fictional books, by Roberto Bolaño
