= Lemistry =

Collection of short stories and essays

Lemistry: A Celebration of the Work of Stanisław Lem is a 2012 anthology associated with the work of Polish science fiction writer Stanisław Lem. It includes three Lem's short stories translated into English for the first time, as well as a number of Lem's fanfics and essays about Lem's work.

Six stories from the book (Lem's stories, as well as "Snail", "Stanlemian", and "The Apocrypha of Lem") were nominated for the 2012 Science Fiction & Fantasy Translation Awards, category "Short Form Award".

== Contents ==
The collection consists of three parts.

=== "Originals" ===
The three Lem's short stories were translated into English by Antolia LLoyd-Jones for the first time. Aiden O'Reilly notes that while these are not the best representation of Lem, they will be of interest to Lem's fans.

- "The Lilo"
  First published in Polish 1996, under the title "Materac" ("Mattress") in the collection Zagadka [The Enigma]; German title: "Die Blaurote Luftmatratze" ["Blue-red air mattress"]
- "Darkness and Mildew"
  First appeared in 1959, in the collection Inwazja z Aldebarana as "Ciemność i pleśń"
- "Invasion from Aldebaran"
  First appeared in 1959, in the collection Inwazja z Aldebarana A drunken villager defeats an alien invasion.

=== "Reconstructed Originals" ===
- "Every Little Helps by Frank Cottrell Boyce. Reviewed by Stanisław Lem", by Frank Cottrell-Boyce
  A spoof of Lem's faux reviews
- PIED PIPER by Adam Roberts
- THE MELANCHOLY by Toby Litt
- TOBY Annie Clarkson
- "The Tale of Trurl and Great TanGent" by Ian Watson
- "The 5-Sigma Certainty" by Trevor Hoyle
  A fictional journalist's account of tracking down Philip K. Dick to figure out his theories on Lem
- SNAIL by Piotr Szulkin
- LESS THAN KIN, MORE THAN KIND Brian Aldiss
- "Traces Remain", by Sarah Schofield
- "Stanlemian" Wojciech Orliński
  Steve Mollmann, a co-writer of Star Trek, explains the title as follows: "The title is mean to be in opposition to "phildickian": whereas phildickian describes situations where reality is difficult to determine, stanlemian is used to describe situations where the problem has been solved." The story is about people gambling in virtual reality and the protagonist is hired by a gambler to get the money from the virtual into the real world without the knowledge of the gambler's girlfriend.
  The translation was in the shortlist for the 2012 Science Fiction & Fantasy Translation Awards, category "Short Form Award"
- Terracotta Robot, by Adam Marek
  "Terracotta" is a hint to Chinese Terracotta Army. The story takes place at a former factory for terracotta battle robots turned a tourist attraction.
- EX LIBRIS by Sean O'Brien
- "The Apocrypha of Lem by Dan Tukagawa, J. B. Krupsky, and Aaron Orvits, reviewed by Jacek Dukaj", by Jacek Dukaj

- Another spoof of Lem's faux reviews; a "review" of a book about the literary works (and legal wrangles) of three post hominem Lems (postLems), which are three different posthumous computer simulations of Lem based on different principles.

=== "Apocrypha" ===
- "Stanislaw Lem – Who's He?", by Andy Sawyer
- Of Insects And Armies, by dr. Sarah Davies
  A view on military nanotechnology; reviewing Lem's faux review "Weapon Systems of The Twenty First Century or The Upside-down Evolution"
- "Building Reliable Systems Out of Unreliable Components", by professor Steve Furber
- "The Spontaneous Machine", by professor Hod Lipson
