= Stanisław Bereś =

Polish literary scholar (born 1950)

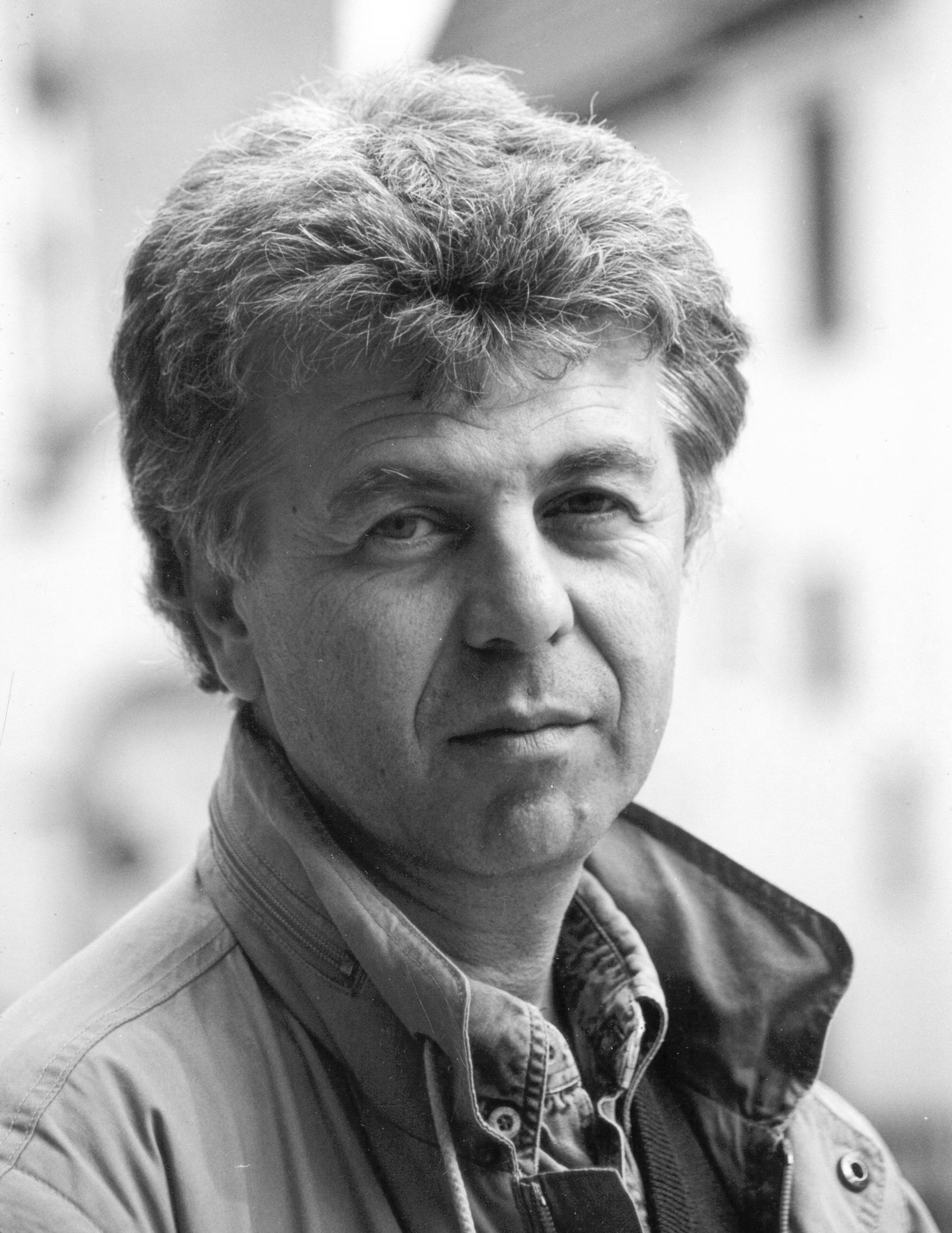

Stanisław Bereś (born 4 May 1950) is a Polish poet, literary critic, translator and literary historian.

He is professor at the University of Wroclaw, both at the Institute of Polish Philology and the Department of Journalism and Social Communication. In 1987-1993 he taught at the University of Charles de Gaulle in Lille, France.

Since 1996 he is the editor of Telewizyjne Wiadomości Literackie ("Literary TV News"). In 1997-1998 he was editor of the cultural TV magazine Latarnik ("Lamplighter").

In 1996-2005 he was on the jury board of Nike Award, Polish language literature prize.

Stanisław Bereś published over 20 books an over 360 articles.

== Books ==
- Wybór niezobowiązujący (Wydawnictwo Literackie 1983).
- Lem über Lem. Gespräche (Insel Verlag, Frankfurt am Main 1986).
- Rozmowy ze Stanisławem Lemem (Wydawnictwo Literackie, Kraków 1987).
- Pół wieku czyśćca. Rozmowy z Tadeuszem Konwickim (pod ps. Stanisław Nowicki; Aneks, Londyn 1987; Przedświt, Warszawa 1987; Oficyna Wydawnicza Interim, Warszawa 1990; Kraków 2002;
  - French translation: Un demi-siècle de purgatoire, Noir sur Blanc, Paryż 1993).
- Ostatnia wileńska plejada. Szkice o poezji kręgu Żagarów (PEN, Warszawa 1991).
- Już tylko sen (Aneks, Londyn 1990).
- Historia nie byle jaka o dziejach dzielnego Chluptaka (Aneks, Londyn 1991).
- Poètes de l’Apocalypse. Anthologie de poésie en polonais, hébreu et yiddish (1939–1945) (PUL, Lille 1991; together with D. Beauvois, J.M. Delmaire, M. Laurent).
- La Nouvelle Vague Polonaise. Anthologie des oeuvres poetiques (Centre d’Etudes de la Culture Polonaise, Lille 1992).
- Uwięziony w śmierci. O twórczości Tadeusza Gajcego (PEN, Warszawa 1992).
- Rozdarta kurtyna. Rozważania nie tylko o teatrze (Aneks, Londyn 1993; together with Kazimierzem Braunem).
- Historia literatury polskiej w rozmowach. XX-XXI. T. 1 (WAB; Warszawa 2002).
- Tako rzecze... Lem (Wydawnictwo Literackie, Kraków 2002).
- Szuflada z Atlantydy. Szkice o literaturze polskiej XX wieku (Dolnośląskie Wydawnictwo Edukacyjne, Wrocław 2002).
- Salon III Rzeczypospolitej, czyli Spotkania w salonie prof. Józefa Dudka (Atut, Wrocław 2006).
- Historia i fantastyka. Rozmowy z Andrzejem Sapkowskim (SuperNowa, Warszawa 2005).
