= Peter Swirski =

Canadian novelist and literary critic

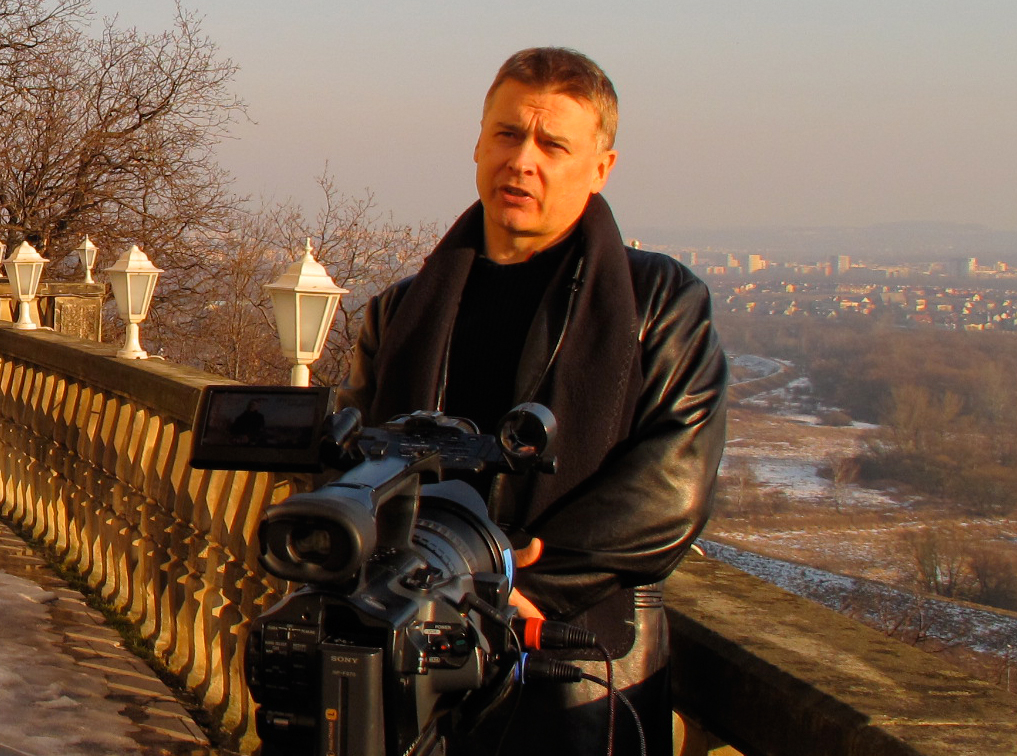
- Peter Swirski interviewed for European TV, 2009.
- Occupations: Novelist, Literary Critic

Peter Swirski is a Canadian novelist and former literary critic, featured in Canadian Who's Who. He is the author of two novels, in addition to 19 nonfictions, including the prize-winning Ars Americana, Ars Politica (2010) and the staple of American popular culture studies From Lowbrow to Nobrow (2005). His other nonfictions studies include American Utopia and Social Engineering (2011), American Political Fictions (2015), American Utopia: Literature, Society, and the Human Use of Human Beings (2020, Routledge textbook), and the digital-futurological bestseller From Literature to Biterature (2013). He is also the leading authority on the late writer and philosopher Stanisław Lem.

== Life and career ==
Peter Swirski was formerly a professor and research director at the Helsinki Institute for Advanced Studies in Finland, Distinguished Professor of American Studies and Literature at Sun Yat-sen University, Associate Professor and Director of American Studies at HKU, Assistant Professor and Senior Research Associate at the University of Alberta, and an honorary professor in American literature at South China University of Technology. He obtained his doctorate summa cum laude from McGill University in Montreal, in 1996.

Swirski's 2005 study of American popular and "nobrow" cultures, From Lowbrow to Nobrow, was followed up by several other books on "nobrow" literature, culture, and other forms of "artertainment" (his coinage): American Crime Fiction (2016), a collection of critical essays When Highbrow Meets Lowbrow: Popular Culture and the Rise of Nobrow (2017), and The Art of Artertainment: Nobrow, American Style (2019). His book Ars Americana, Ars Politica (2010) received a positive review from the Financial Times.

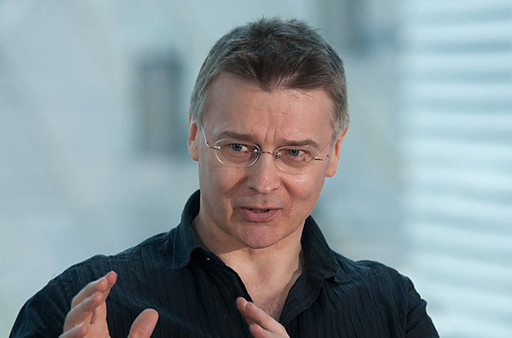
Peter Swirski on BBC Forum, 2012.

A number of his monographs, collections, as well as articles from the Times Literary Supplement to the MIT Technology Review and other venues deal with the analysis of the work of the writer and philosopher Stanislaw Lem.

In 2012 Ars Americana was the subject of Professor Swirski's plenary lecture at UNE's Institute for Global Humanities alongside Noam Chomsky and other speakers. In the summer and fall of 2013, he was a speaker at the 4th Philippine Literary festival in Manila, and a BBC World Service panelist at the Hong Kong International Literary Festival. In March 2015, he was a keynoter at the Millennium International Documentary Film Festival in Brussels. In 2022 he was an invited speaker at the Santa Fe Institute's Interplanetary Project.

== Novels ==
- Behold a Virgin (2026)
- The Orion Project (2026)

=== Nonfiction ===
- American Utopia: Literature, Society, and the Human Use of Human Beings (2020)
- The Art of Artertainment: Nobrow, American Style (2019)
- When Highbrow Meets Lowbrow: Popular Fiction and the Rise of Nobrow (2017)
- American Crime Fiction: A Cultural History of Nobrow Literature as Art (2016)
- American Political Fictions: War on Errorism in Contemporary American Literature, Culture, and Politics (2015)
- Stanislaw Lem: Philosopher of the Future (2015)
- Lemography: Stanislaw Lem in the Eyes of the World (2014)
- Stanislaw Lem--Selected Letters to Michael Kandel (2014)
- From Literature to Biterature: Lem, Turing, Darwin, and Explorations in Computer Literature, Philosophy of Mind, and Cultural Evolution (2013)
- American Utopia and Social Engineering in Literature, Social Thought, and Political History (2011)
- Ars Americana, Ars Politica: Partisan Expression in Contemporary American Literature and Culture (2010)
- Literature, Analytically Speaking: Explorations in the Theory of Interpretation, Analytic Aesthetics, and Evolution (Cognitive Approaches to Literature and Culture) (2010)
- I Sing the Body Politic: History as Prophecy in Contemporary American Literature (2009)
- Of Literature and Knowledge: Explorations in Narrative Thought Experiments, Evolution, and Game Theory (2007)
- All Roads Lead to the American City (2007)
- The Art and Science of Stanislaw Lem (2006)
- From Lowbrow to Nobrow (2005)
- Between Literature and Science: Poe, Lem, and Explorations in Aesthetics, Cognitive Science, and Literary Knowledge (2000)
- A Stanislaw Lem Reader (Rethinking Theory) (1997)
