= Wojciech Orliński =

Polish journalist, writer, blogger, and trade unionist (born 1969)

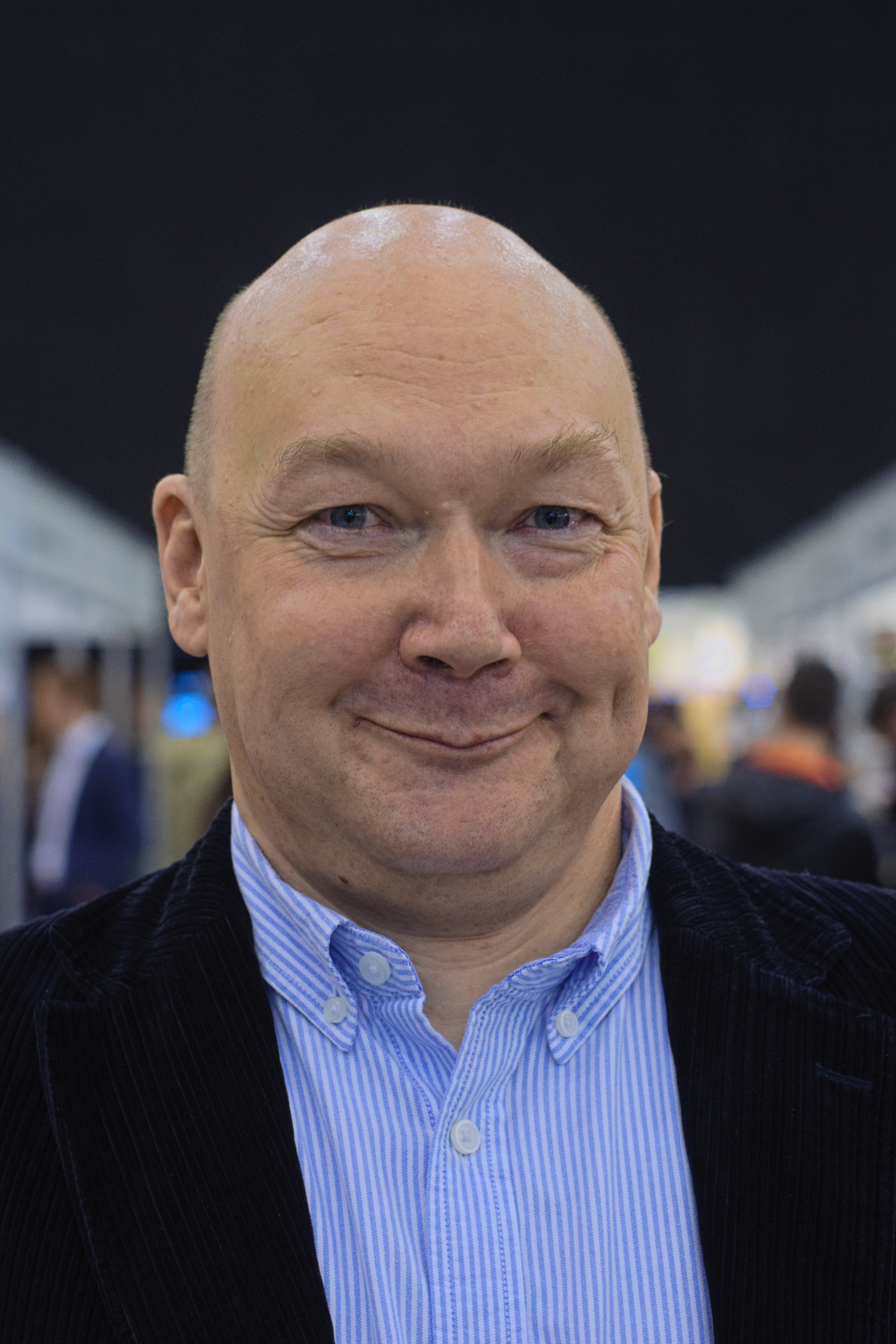
- Wojciech Orliński at the Silesian Book Fair 2019 in Katowice
- Born: 24 January 1969 (age 57); Warsaw, Poland
- Occupations: Writer, journalist
- Writing career
- Genres: Science fiction, journalism, travel
- Website: ekskursje.pl

Wojciech Orliński
- Title: President of the Solidarity trade union at Agora
- Term: 2011–2021
- Successor: Adriana Rozwadowska

Wojciech Orliński (born 24 January 1969 in Warsaw) is a Polish journalist, writer, and blogger. In the 1990s, he was a member of the Polish Socialist Party. Between 1997 and 2021, he was a regular columnist for Gazeta Wyborcza. From 2011 to 2021, he was also the president of the Solidarity trade union at Agora, the newspaper's publisher. Since 2020, he has been working as a chemistry teacher.

He has written several books, including an alternate history novel (Polska nie istnieje), an encyclopaedic guide to Stanisław Lem (Co to są sepulki?), a biography of Stanisław Lem, three travel books and an essay on dangers connected with the development of the Internet. He has also published science-fiction stories and opinion pieces in Nowa Fantastyka.

== Works ==
=== Books ===
- Co to są sepulki? Wszystko o Lemie (2007) – a book about Stanisław Lem
  - In 2012 an interactive version of the book was released for iPad under the title "Lemologia, czyli co to są sepulki?"
- Mark Barber – Urban Legends (RM 2007) – preface to the Polish edition and a chapter about Polish urban legends
- Ameryka nie istnieje (Pascal, 2010) – a book describing the author's journey across the US.
- Internet. Czas się bać (Agora 2013) – a book busting myths about the goodness of Internet and showing the dangers.
- 10 lat emocji. Kino polskie 2005–2015 (Agora 2015) – a book about Polish cinema
- Polska nie istnieje (NCK 2015) – the book, set in the early 21st century, follows a protagonist's journey as he travels across Europe and eventually to the US, encountering a world shaped by an alternate history where the 1877 US workers' strike had sparked a socialist revolution, leading to a vastly different political reality all over the world, with Poland among others not existing.
- Lem. Życie nie z tej ziemi (Czarne, 2017) – a biography of Stanisław Lem
- Człowiek, który wynalazł internet (Agora 2019) – a biography of Paul Baran
- Lem w PRL-u (Wydawnictwo Literackie 2021) – a book about Stanisław Lem during the Polish People's Republic
- Kopernik. Rewolucje (Agora 2022) – a biography of Nicolaus Copernicus

=== Short stories ===
- Retro ("Nowa Fantastyka" 11/1991)
- Śnieżka ("Nowa Fantastyka" 1/1999)
- Wszystkie szajby świata ("Nowa Fantastyka" 4/2007)
- Diabeł warszawski (Ksiega strachu anthology, Runa 2007)
- Socpunk ("Nowa Fantastyka" 2/2008)
- Stanlemian (Głos Lema anthology, Powergraph 2011, Lemistry anthology, Comma Press 2011)
- Conrad Street (Conradology anthology, Comma Press 2017)

=== Translations ===
- Isaiah Berlin – Karl Marx: His Life and Environment (Książka i Wiedza 1999) – Polish translation
