= Stanisław Lem =

Polish science fiction author and futurologist (1921–2006)

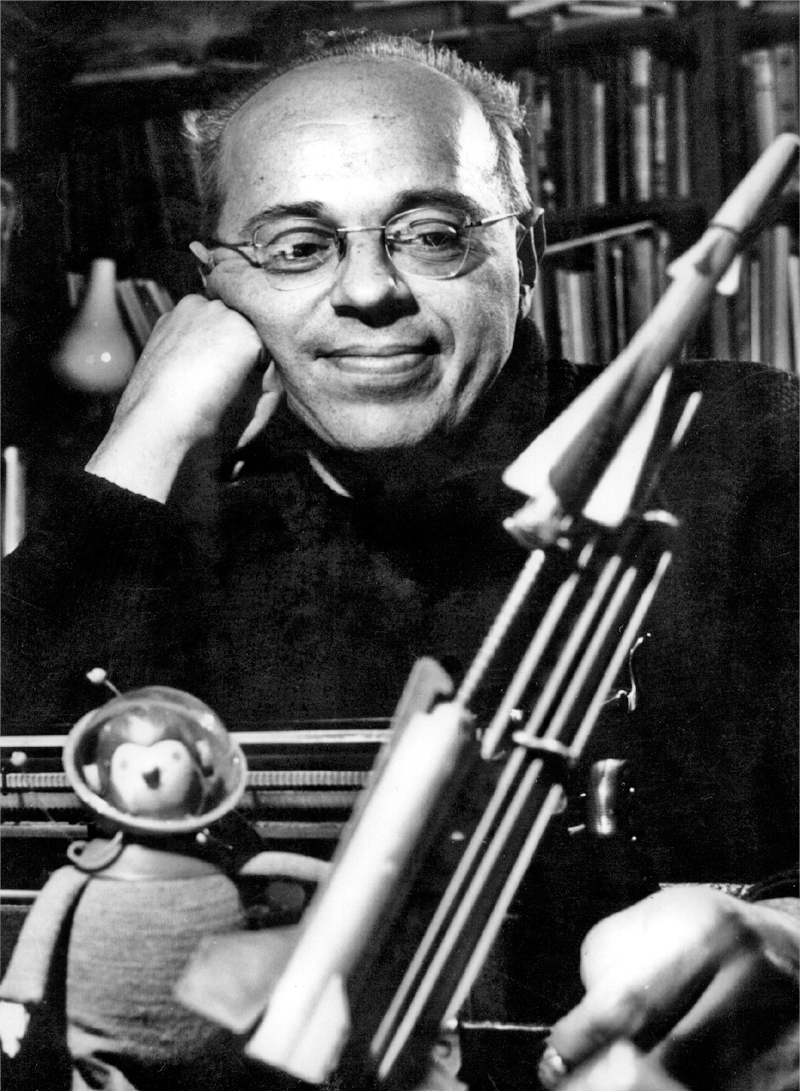
- Lem in 1966
- Born: Stanisław Herman Lem; 12 September 1921; Lwów, Second Polish Republic (now in Ukraine)
- Died: 27 March 2006 (aged 84); Kraków, Poland
- Occupation: Writer
- Spouse: Barbara Leśniak (m. 1953)
- Children: 1
- Writing career
- Language: Polish
- Period: 1946–2005
- Genres: Hard science fiction, philosophy, satire, futurology

Philosophical work
- School: Agnosticism; Humanism; Misanthropism; Postpositivism
- Main interests: Anthropology; Epistemology; Futurology; Technology
- Notable works: Full list
- Website: lem.pl

Stanisław Herman Lem (Polish: [staˈɲiswaf ˈlɛm]; 12 September 1921 – 27 March 2006) was a Polish writer. He was the author of many novels, short stories, and essays on various subjects, including philosophy, futurology, and literary criticism. Many of his science fiction stories are of satirical and humorous character. Lem's books have been translated into more than 50 languages and have sold more than 45 million copies. Worldwide, he is best known as the author of the 1961 novel Solaris. In 1976, Theodore Sturgeon wrote that Lem was the most widely read science fiction writer in the world.

Lem was the author of the fundamental philosophical work Summa Technologiae, in which he anticipated the creation of virtual reality, artificial intelligence, and also developed the ideas of human autoevolution, the creation of artificial worlds, and many others. Lem's science fiction works explore philosophical themes through speculations on technology, the nature of intelligence, the impossibility of communication with and understanding of alien intelligence, despair about human limitations, and humanity's place in the universe. His essays and philosophical books cover these and many other topics. Translating his works is difficult due to Lem's elaborate neologisms and idiomatic wordplay.

The Sejm (the lower house of the Polish Parliament) declared 2021 Stanisław Lem Year.

== Life ==
=== Early life ===
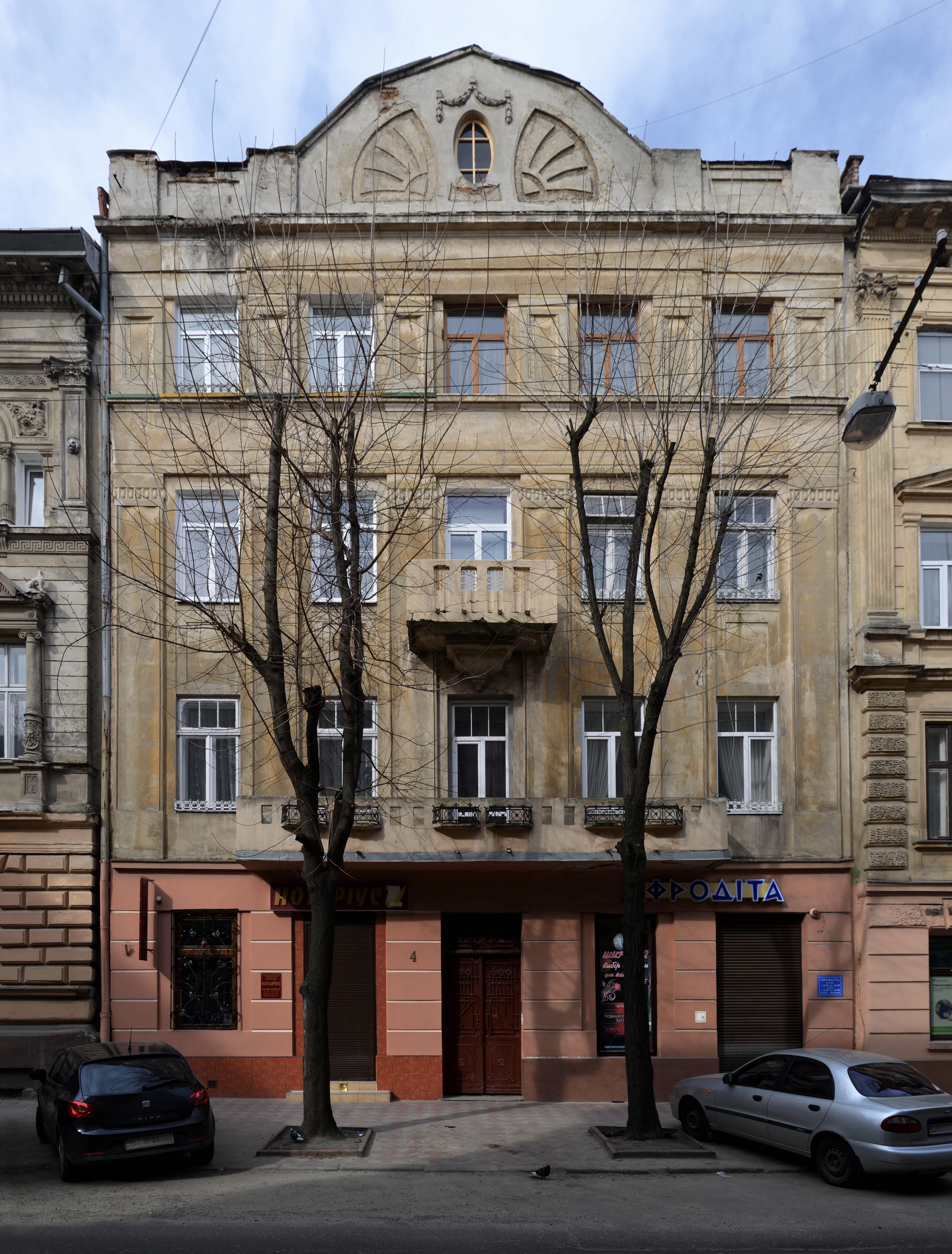
House No. 4 on Bohdan Lepky Street in Lviv, where, according to his autobiography Highcastle, Lem spent his childhood

Lem was born in 1921 in Lwów, interwar Poland (now Lviv, Ukraine). According to his own account, he was actually born on 13 September, but the date was changed to the 12th on his birth certificate because of superstition. He was the son of Sabina née Woller (1892–1979) and Samuel Lem (Note: Samuel Lem changed his last name from Lehm (meaning "loam", "clay" in German/Yiddish) to Lem in 1904.) (1879–1954), a wealthy laryngologist and former physician in the Austro-Hungarian Army, and first cousin to Polish poet Marian Hemar (Lem's father's sister's son). In later years Lem sometimes claimed to have been raised Roman Catholic, but he went to Jewish religious lessons during his school years. He later became an atheist "for moral reasons ... the world appears to me to be put together in such a painful way that I prefer to believe that it was not created ... intentionally". In later years he would call himself both an agnostic and an atheist.

After the 1939 Soviet invasion of Poland's former eastern territory (now part of Ukraine and Belarus), he was not allowed to study at Lwów Polytechnic as he wished because of his "bourgeois origin"; it was due to his father's connections that he was accepted to study medicine at Lwów University in 1940. During the subsequent Nazi occupation (1941–1944), Lem's Jewish family avoided placement in the Nazi Lwów Ghetto, surviving with false papers. He would later recall:

During that period, I learned in a very personal, practical way that I was no "Aryan". I knew that my ancestors were Jews, but I knew nothing of the Mosaic faith and, regrettably, nothing at all of Jewish culture. So it was, strictly speaking, only the Nazi legislation that brought home to me the realization that I had Jewish blood in my veins.

During that time, Lem earned a living as a car mechanic and welder, and occasionally stole munitions from storehouses (to which he had access as an employee of a German company) to pass them on to the Polish resistance.

In 1945, Lwów was annexed into the Soviet Ukraine, and the family, along with many other Polish citizens, was resettled to Kraków, where Lem, at his father's insistence, took up medical studies at the Jagiellonian University. He did not take his final examinations on purpose, to avoid the career of military doctor, which he suspected could have become lifelong. (Note: Lech Keller suggests a slightly different reason why Lem did not pursue the diploma: since his father was a functionary of Sanitary Department of the infamous UB (Ministry of Public Security), he would have probably been assigned to the hospital subordinated to UB, probably to the same department his father served. Keller further remarks that it was well-known that UB doctors were used to "restore the conditions" of the interrogated dissidents. See Lech Keller, "Przyczynek do biografii Stanisława Lema" (retrieved 16 February 2020), Acta Polonica Monashiensis (Monash University, Melbourne, Victoria, Australia) Volume 3 Number 2, R&S Press, Melbourne, Victoria, 2019, pp. 94, 107) After receiving absolutorium (Latin term for the evidence of completion of the studies without diploma), he did an obligatory monthly work at a hospital, at a maternity ward, where he assisted at a number of childbirths and a caesarean section. Lem said that the sight of blood was one of the reasons he decided to drop medicine.

=== Rise to fame ===
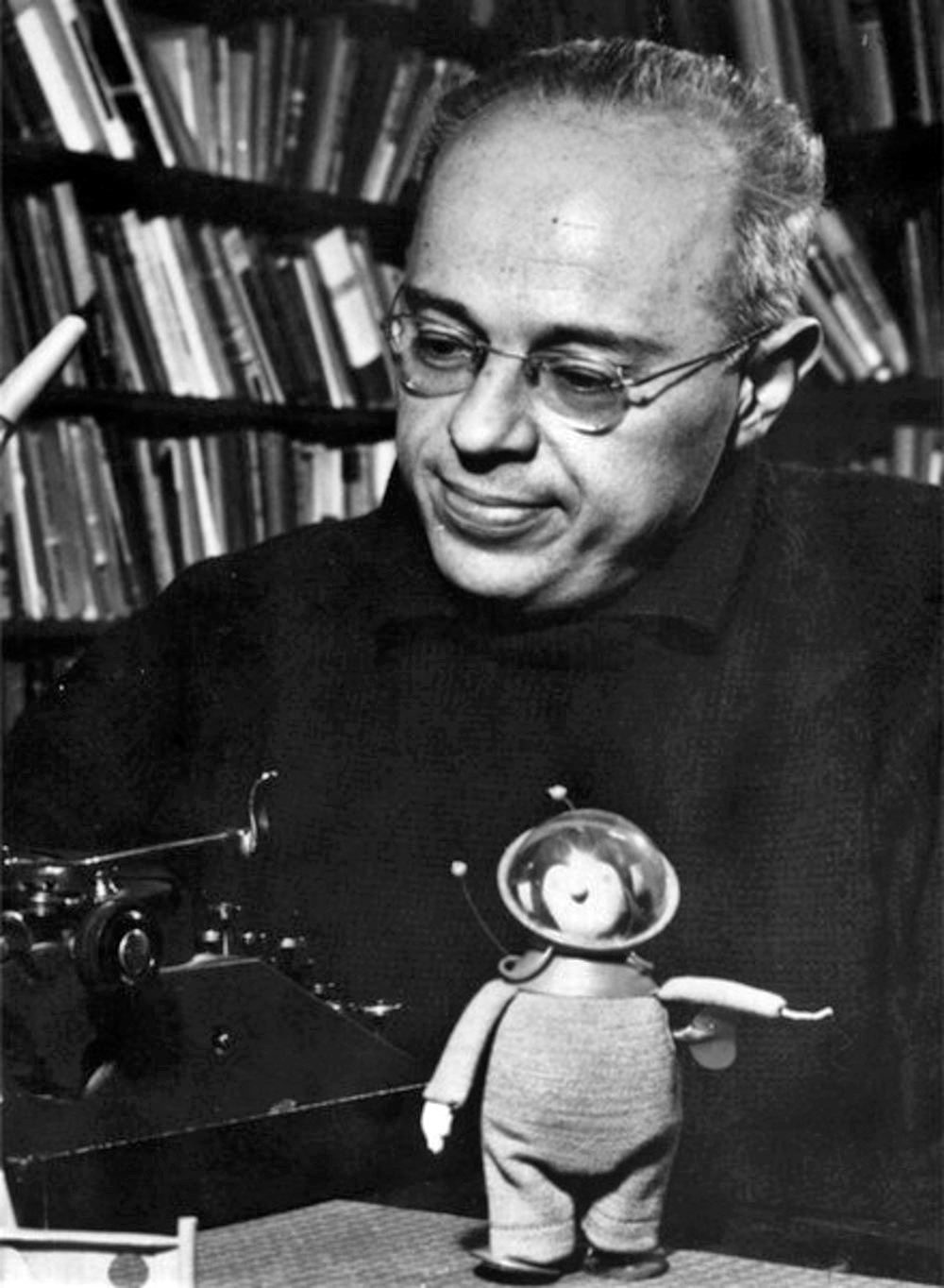
Stanisław Lem and toy cosmonaut, 1966

Lem started his literary work in 1946 with a number of publications in different genres, including poetry, as well as his first science fiction novel, The Man from Mars, serialized in Nowy Świat Przygód (New World of Adventures). Between 1948 and 1950 Lem was working as a scientific research assistant at the Jagiellonian University, and published a number of short stories, poems, reviews, etc., particularly in the magazine Tygodnik Powszechny. In 1951, he published his first book, The Astronauts. In 1954, he published a short story collection, Sezam i inne opowiadania [Sesame and Other Stories] . The following year, 1955, saw the publication of another science fiction novel, The Magellanic Cloud.

During the era of Stalinism in Poland, which had begun in the late 1940s, all published works had to be directly approved by the state. Thus The Astronauts was not, in fact, the first novel Lem finished, just the first that made it past the state censors. Going by the date of the finished manuscript, Lem's first book was a partly autobiographical novel Hospital of the Transfiguration, finished in 1948. It would be published seven years later, in 1955, as a part of the trilogy Czas nieutracony (Time Not Lost). The experience of trying to push Czas nieutracony through the censors was one of the major reasons Lem decided to focus on the less-censored genre of science fiction. Nonetheless, most of Lem's works published in the 1950s also contain various elements of socialist realism as well as of the "glorious future of communism". Lem later criticized several of his early pieces as compromised by the ideological pressure.

Lem became truly productive after 1956, when the de-Stalinization period in the Soviet Union led to the "Polish October", when Poland experienced an increase in freedom of speech. Between 1956 and 1968, Lem authored seventeen books.

In 1957, he published his first non-fiction, philosophical book, Dialogs, as well as a science fiction anthology, The Star Diaries, collecting short stories about one of his most popular characters, Ijon Tichy. 1959 saw the publication of three books: the novels Eden and The Investigation, and the short story anthology An Invasion from Aldebaran (Inwazja z Aldebarana). 1961 saw the novels Memoirs Found in a Bathtub, Solaris, and Return from the Stars, with Solaris being among his top works. This was followed by a collection of his essays and non-fiction prose, Wejście na orbitę (1962), and a short story anthology Noc księżycowa (1963). In 1964, Lem published a large work on the border of philosophy and sociology of science and futurology, Summa Technologiae, as well as a novel, The Invincible.

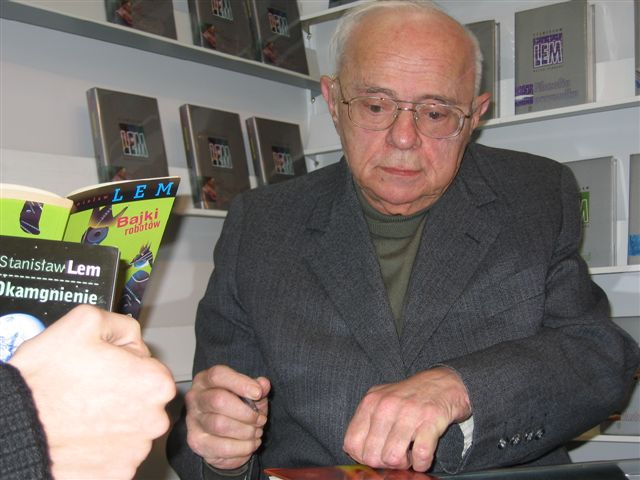
Lem signing in Kraków, 30 October 2005

1965 saw the publication of The Cyberiad and of a short story collection, The Hunt (Polowanie). 1966 was the year of Highcastle, followed in 1968 by His Master's Voice and Tales of Pirx the Pilot. Highcastle was another of Lem's autobiographical works, and touched upon a theme that usually was not favored by the censors: Lem's youth in the pre-war, then-Polish, Lviv. 1968 and 1970 saw two more non-fiction treatises, The Philosophy of Chance and Science Fiction and Futurology. Ijon Tichy returned in 1971's The Futurological Congress; in the same year Lem released a genre-mixing experiment, A Perfect Vacuum, a collection of reviews of non-existent books. In 1973 a similar work, Imaginary Magnitude, was published. In 1976, Lem published two works: "The Mask" and The Chain of Chance. In 1980, he published another set of reviews of non-existent works, Provocation. The following year saw another Tichy novel, Observation on the Spot, and Golem XIV. Later in that decade, Lem published Peace on Earth (1984) and Fiasco (1986), his last science fiction novel.

In the late 1970s and early 1980s, Lem cautiously supported the Polish dissident movement, and started publishing essays in the Paris-based magazine Kultura. In 1982, with martial law in Poland declared, Lem moved to West Berlin, where he became a fellow of the Institute for Advanced Study, Berlin (Wissenschaftskolleg zu Berlin). After that, he settled in Vienna. He returned to Poland in 1988.

=== Final years ===
From the late 1980s onwards, Lem tended to concentrate on philosophical texts and essays, published in Polish magazines including Tygodnik Powszechny, Odra, and Przegląd. These were later collected in a number of anthologies.

In the early 1980s literary critic and historian Stanisław Bereś conducted a lengthy interview with Lem, which was published in book format in 1987 as Rozmowy ze Stanisławem Lemem (Conversations with Stanisław Lem). That edition was subject to censorship. A revised, complete edition was published in 2002 as Tako rzecze… Lem (Thus spoke... Lem).

In the early 1990s, Lem met with the literary critic and scholar Peter Swirski for a series of extensive interviews, published together with other critical materials and translations as A Stanislaw Lem Reader (1997). In these interviews Lem speaks about a range of issues he rarely discussed previously. The book also includes Swirski's translation of Lem's retrospective essay "Thirty Years Later", devoted to Lem's nonfictional treatise Summa Technologiae. During later interviews in 2005, Lem expressed his disappointment with the genre of science fiction, and his general pessimism regarding technical progress. He viewed the human body as unsuitable for space travel, held that information technology drowns people in a glut of low-quality information, and considered truly intelligent robots as both undesirable and impossible to construct.

== Writings ==
=== Science fiction ===
Lem's prose shows a mastery of numerous genres and themes.

==== Recurring themes ====
One of Lem's major recurring themes, beginning from his very first novel, The Man from Mars, was the impossibility of communication between profoundly alien beings, which may have no common ground with human intelligence, and humans. The best known example is the living planetary ocean in Solaris. Other examples include the intelligent swarms of mechanical insect-like micromachines in The Invincible, and strangely ordered societies of more human-like beings in Fiasco and Eden, describing the failure of first contact.

Another key recurring theme is the shortcomings of humans. In His Master's Voice, Lem describes the failure of humanity's intelligence to decipher and truly comprehend an apparent message from space. Two overlapping arcs of short stories, Fables for Robots and The Cyberiad provide a commentary on humanity in the form of a series of grotesque, humorous, fairytale-like short stories about a mechanical universe inhabited by robots (who have occasional contact with biological "slimies" and human "palefaces"). Lem also underlines the uncertainties of evolution, including that it might not progress upwards in intelligence.

=== Other writings ===
The Investigation and The Chain of Chance are crime novels (the latter without a murderer); Pamiętnik... is a psychological drama inspired by Kafka. A Perfect Vacuum and Imaginary Magnitude are collections of reviews of and introductions to non-existent books. Similarly, Provocations purports to review a non-existent Holocaust-themed work.

=== Essays ===
Dialogs and Summa Technologiae (1964) are Lem's two most famous philosophical texts. The Summa is notable for being a unique analysis of prospective social, cybernetic, and biological advances; in this work, Lem discusses philosophical implications of technologies that were completely in the realm of science fiction at the time, but are gaining importance today—for instance, virtual reality and nanotechnology.

=== Views in later life ===
Throughout the entirety of his life, Stanisław Lem remained deeply attached to his original hometown of Lwów (then in Poland, now Lviv in Ukraine) and missed it greatly. Although he never called for Poland to retake the city, he expressed sorrow and felt a sense of injustice at Poland losing the city to the USSR after the Second World War. His criticism of most science fiction surfaced in literary and philosophical essays Science Fiction and Futurology and interviews. In the 1990s, Lem forswore science fiction and returned to futurological prognostications, most notably those expressed in Okamgnienie [Blink of an Eye]. He had a deep appreciation for the works of Polish writer Czesław Miłosz and respected Józef Piłsudski as a national leader.

Lem said that since the success of the trade union Solidarity, and the collapse of the Soviet empire, he felt his wild dreams about the future could no longer compare with reality. He became increasingly critical of modern technology in his later life, criticising inventions such as the Internet, which he said "makes it easier to hurt our neighbors." He was a proponent of nuclear power, which he saw as a potential means for Poland to secure its sovereignty via reducing dependency on fossil fuels from Russia. In his 2004-2006 columns for Tygodnik Powszechny, Lem was highly critical of Vladimir Putin, George W. Bush, Andrzej Lepper, Samoobrona, the League of Polish Families, and the All-Polish Youth.

== Relationship with American science fiction ==
=== SFWA ===
Lem was awarded an honorary membership in the Science Fiction Writers of America (SFWA) in 1973. SFWA honorary membership is given to people who do not meet the publishing criteria for joining the regular membership, but who would be welcomed as members had their work appeared in the qualifying English-language publications. Lem never had a high opinion of American science fiction, describing it as ill-thought-out, poorly written, and interested more in making money than in ideas or new literary forms. After his eventual American publication, when he became eligible for regular membership, his honorary membership was rescinded. This formal action was interpreted by some SFWA members as a rebuke for his stance, and it seems that Lem interpreted it as such. Lem was invited to stay on with the organization with a regular membership, but he declined. After many members (including Ursula K. Le Guin, who quit her membership and then refused the Nebula Award for Best Novelette for The Diary of the Rose) protested against Lem's treatment by the SFWA, a member offered to pay his dues. Lem never accepted the offer.

=== Philip K. Dick ===
Lem singled out only one American science fiction writer for praise, Philip K. Dick, in a 1984 English-language anthology of his critical essays, Microworlds: Writings on Science Fiction and Fantasy. Lem had initially held a low opinion of Philip K. Dick (as he did for the bulk of American science fiction) and would later say that this was due to a limited familiarity with Dick's work, since Western literature was hard to come by in the Polish People's Republic.

Dick alleged that Stanisław Lem was probably a false name used by a composite committee operating on orders of the Communist party to gain control over public opinion, and wrote a letter to the FBI to that effect. There were several attempts to explain Dick's act. Lem was responsible for the Polish translation of Dick's work Ubik in 1972, and when Dick felt monetarily short-changed by the publisher, he held Lem personally responsible (see Microworlds). Also it was suggested that Dick was under the influence of strong medications, including opioids, and may have experienced a "slight disconnect from reality" some time before writing the letter. A "defensive patriotism" of Dick against Lem's attacks on American science fiction may have played some role as well. Lem would later mention Dick in his monograph Science Fiction and Futurology.

== Significance ==
=== Writing ===
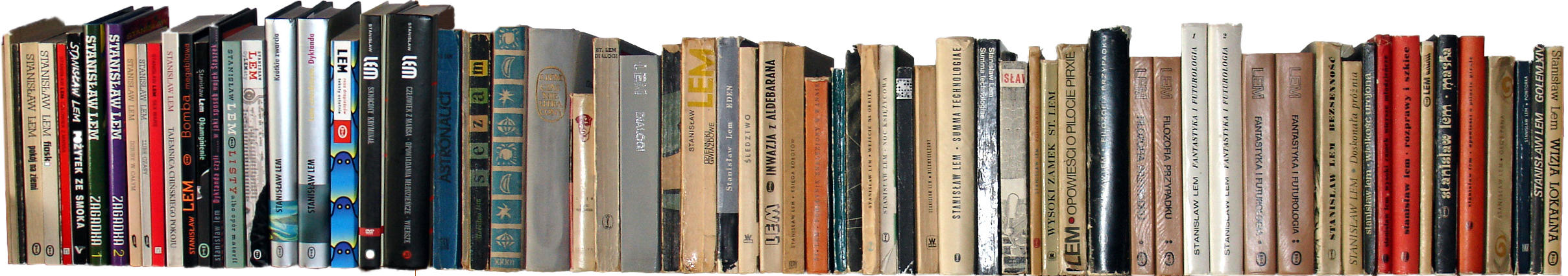
First Polish editions of books by Lem

Lem is one of the most highly acclaimed science fiction writers, hailed by critics as equal to such classic authors as H. G. Wells and Olaf Stapledon. In 1976, Theodore Sturgeon wrote that Lem was the most widely read science fiction writer in the world. In Poland, in the 1960s and 1970s, Lem remained under the radar of mainstream critics, who dismissed him as a "mass market", low-brow, youth-oriented writer; such dismissal might have given him a form of invisibility from censorship.

In 1999, Franz Rottensteiner, Lem's former agent abroad, had this to say about Lem's reception on international markets:

With [number of translations and copies sold], Lem is the most successful author in modern Polish fiction; nevertheless his commercial success in the world is limited, and the bulk of his large editions was due to the special publishing conditions in the Communist countries: Poland, the Soviet Union, and the German Democratic Republic. Only in West Germany was Lem really a critical and a commercial success [... and everywhere ...] in recent years interest in him has waned. Lem is the only writer of European [science fiction, most of whose] books have been translated into English, and [...] kept in print in the USA. Lem's critical success in English is due mostly to the excellent translations of Michael Kandel.

Lem's works were widely translated abroad, appearing in more than 40 languages and have sold more than 45 million copies. As of 2020, about 1.5 million copies were sold in Poland after his death, with the annual numbers of 100,000 matching the new bestsellers.

=== Influence ===
Will Wright's popular city-planning game SimCity was partly inspired by Lem's short story "The Seventh Sally" in The Cyberiad.

The video game Stellaris is highly inspired by his works, as its creators said at the start of 2021, designated the "Year of Lem".

A major character in the film Planet 51, an alien Lem, was named by screenwriter Joe Stillman after Stanisław Lem. Since the film was intended to be a parody of American pulp science fiction shot in Eastern Europe, Stillman thought that it would be hilarious to hint at the writer whose works have nothing to do with little green men.

== Adaptations of Lem's works ==
Solaris was made into a film in 1968 by Russian director Boris Nirenburg, a film in 1972 by Russian director Andrei Tarkovsky—which won a Special Jury Prize at the Cannes Film Festival in 1972—and an American film in 2002 by Steven Soderbergh. Film critics have noted the influence of Tarkovsky's adaptation on later science fiction films such as Event Horizon (1997) and Christopher Nolan's Inception (2010).

A number of other dramatic and musical adaptations of his work exist, such as adaptations of The Astronauts (First Spaceship on Venus, 1960) and The Magellanic Cloud (Ikarie XB-1, 1963). Lem himself was, however, critical of most of the screen adaptations, with the sole exception of Przekładaniec in 1968 by Andrzej Wajda. In 2013, the Israeli–Polish co-production The Congress was released, inspired by Lem's novel The Futurological Congress.

György Pálfi directed a film adaptation of His Master's Voice with the same title, which was released in 2018.

In 2023, 11 Bit Studios published The Invincible, an adventure video game developed by Starward Industries. The game is an adaptation of Stanisław Lem's 1964 novel.

== Honors ==
=== Awards ===
- 1957 – City of Kraków's Prize in Literature (Nagroda Literacka miasta Krakowa)
- 1965 – Prize of the Minister of Culture and Art, 2nd Level (Nagroda Ministra Kultury i Sztuki II stopnia)
- 1973
  - Prize of the Minister of Foreign Affairs for popularization of Polish culture abroad (nagroda Ministra Spraw Zagranicznych za popularyzację polskiej kultury za granicą)
  - Literary Prize of the Minister of Culture and Art (nagroda literacka Ministra Kultury i Sztuki) and honorary member of Science Fiction Writers of America
- 1976 – State Prize 1st Level in the area of literature (Nagroda Państwowa I stopnia w dziedzinie literatury)
- 1979 – Grand Prix de Littérature Policière for his novel Katar.
- 1986 – Austrian State Prize for European Literature for year 1985
- 1991 – Austrian literary Franz Kafka Prize
- 1996 – recipient of the Order of the White Eagle
- 2005 – Medal for Merit to Culture – Gloria Artis (on the list of the first recipients of the newly introduced medal)

=== Recognition and remembrance ===
- 1972 – member of commission "Poland 2000" of the Polish Academy of Sciences
- 1979 – a minor planet, 3836 Lem, discovered by Soviet astronomer Nikolai Stepanovich Chernykh is named after him.
- 1981 – Doctor honoris causa honorary degree from the Wrocław University of Technology
- 1986 – the whole issue (#40 = Volume 13, Part 3) of Science Fiction Studies was dedicated to Stanislaw Lem
- 1994 – member of the Polish Academy of Learning
- 1997 – honorary citizen of Kraków
- 1998 – Doctor honoris causa from University of Opole, Lviv University, Jagiellonian University
- 2003 – Doctor honoris causa from Bielefeld University
- 2007 – A street in Kraków is to be named in his honour.
- 2009 – A street in Wieliczka was named in his honour
- 2011 – An interactive Google logo inspired by The Cyberiad was created and published in his honor for the 60th anniversary of his first published book: The Astronauts.
- 2013 – two planetoids were named after Lem's literary characters:
  - 343000 Ijontichy, after Ijon Tichy
  - 343444 Halluzinelle, after Tichy's holographic companion Analoge Halluzinelle from German TV series Ijon Tichy: Space Pilot
  - Lem (satellite), a Polish optical astronomy satellite launched in 2013 as part of the Bright-star Target Explorer (BRITE) programme
- 2015 – Pirx (crater), a90 km (55.9 miles) wide impact crater on Pluto's natural satellite Charon, discovered in 2015 by the American New Horizons probe
- 2019 – the star Solaris and its planet Pirx, after the novel Solaris and Tales of Pirx the Pilot
- In December 2020 Polish Parliament declared year of 2021 to be the Year of Stanisław Lem.
- The Museum of City Engineering, Kraków, has the Stanislaw Lem Experience Garden, an outdoor area with more than 70 interactive locations where children can carry out various physical experiments in acoustics, mechanics, hydrostatics and optics. Since 2011 the Garden has been organizing out the competition "Lemoniada", inspired by the creative output of Lem.
- 2021 – Lem Prize has been established by Wrocław University of Science and Technology to commemorate the 100th birthday Stanisław Lem. It is awarded annually to one young (under 40) European researcher whose creative work in science or engineering has potential for positive impact on the future of civilization increasingly filled with technology.

== Political views ==
Lem's early works were socialist realist, possibly to satisfy state censorship. In his later years, Lem was critical of this aspect of his work. In 1982, with the onset of the martial law in Poland, Lem moved to Berlin for studies; between 1983 and 1988, he lived in Vienna. He never showed any wish to relocate permanently in the West. By the standards of the Eastern Bloc, Lem was financially well off for most of his life. Lem was a critic of capitalism, totalitarianism, and of both Stalinist and Western ideologies.

Lem believed there were no absolutes. He said: "I should wish, as do most men, that immutable truths existed, that not all would be eroded by the impact of historical time, that there were some essential propositions, be it only in the field of human values, the basic values, etc. In brief, I long for the absolute. But at the same time I am firmly convinced that there are no absolutes, that everything is historical, and that you cannot get away from history." Lem was concerned that if the human race attained prosperity and comfort, this would lead it to passiveness and degeneration.

== Personal life ==
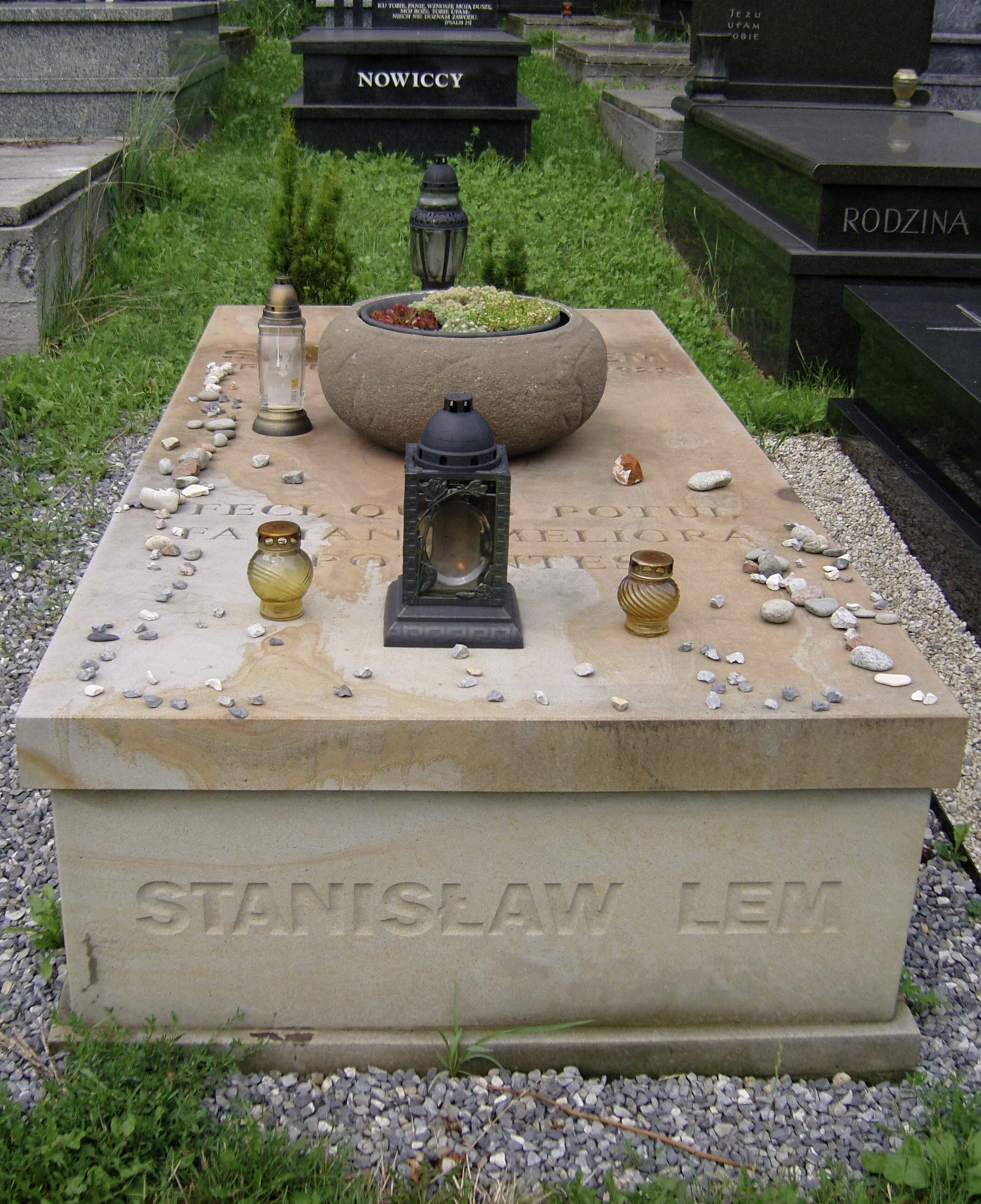
Stanisław Lem's grave at the Salwator Cemetery, Kraków

Lem was a polyglot: he knew Polish, Latin (from medical school), German, French, English, Russian, and Ukrainian. Lem claimed that his IQ was tested at high school as 180.

In 1953, Lem met radiology student Barbara Leśniak, whom he married in a civil ceremony the same year. The couple's church marriage ceremony was performed in February 1954. Barbara died on 27 April 2016. Their only child, Tomasz (born 1968), who graduated with a degree in physics from Princeton University, has written Awantury na tle powszechnego ciążenia (Tantrums on the Background of the Universal Gravitation), a memoir which contains numerous personal details about Lem. The book jacket says Tomasz works as a translator and has a daughter, Anna.

As of 1984, Lem's writing pattern was to get up a short time before five in the morning and start writing soon after; Lem would write for five or six hours before taking a break.

Lem was an aggressive driver. He loved sweets (especially halva and chocolate-covered marzipan), and did not give them up even when, toward the end of his life, he fell ill with diabetes. Due to health problems, Lem stopped smoking in the mid-1980s. Coffee often featured in Lem's writing and interviews.

Stanisław Lem died from a heart failure in the hospital of the Jagiellonian University Medical College, Kraków on 27 March 2006 at the age of 84. He was buried at Salwator Cemetery, Sector W, Row 4, grave 17 (Polish: cmentarz Salwatorski, sektor W, rząd 4, grób 17).

In November 2021, Agnieszka Gajewska's biography of Lem, Holocaust and the Stars, was translated into English by Katarzyna Gucio and published by Routledge. It discussed aspects of Lem's life, such as being forced to wear the yellow badge and being struck for not removing his hat in the presence of Germans, as required of Jews at the time.

Lem loved movies and greatly enjoyed artistic cinema (especially the movies of Luis Buñuel). He also liked King Kong, James Bond, Star Wars, and Star Trek movies but he remained mostly displeased by movies which were based upon his own stories. The only notable exceptions are Voyage to the End of the Universe (1963) (which didn't credit Lem as writer of the original book The Magellanic Cloud) and Przekładaniec (Layer Cake) (1968) (which was based upon his short story "Do You Exist, Mr Jones?").

== Bibliography ==
A list of works by Stanisław Lem and their subsequent adaptations in other media:

A list of books and monographs about Stanisław Lem:
