= List of works by Stanisław Lem and their adaptations =

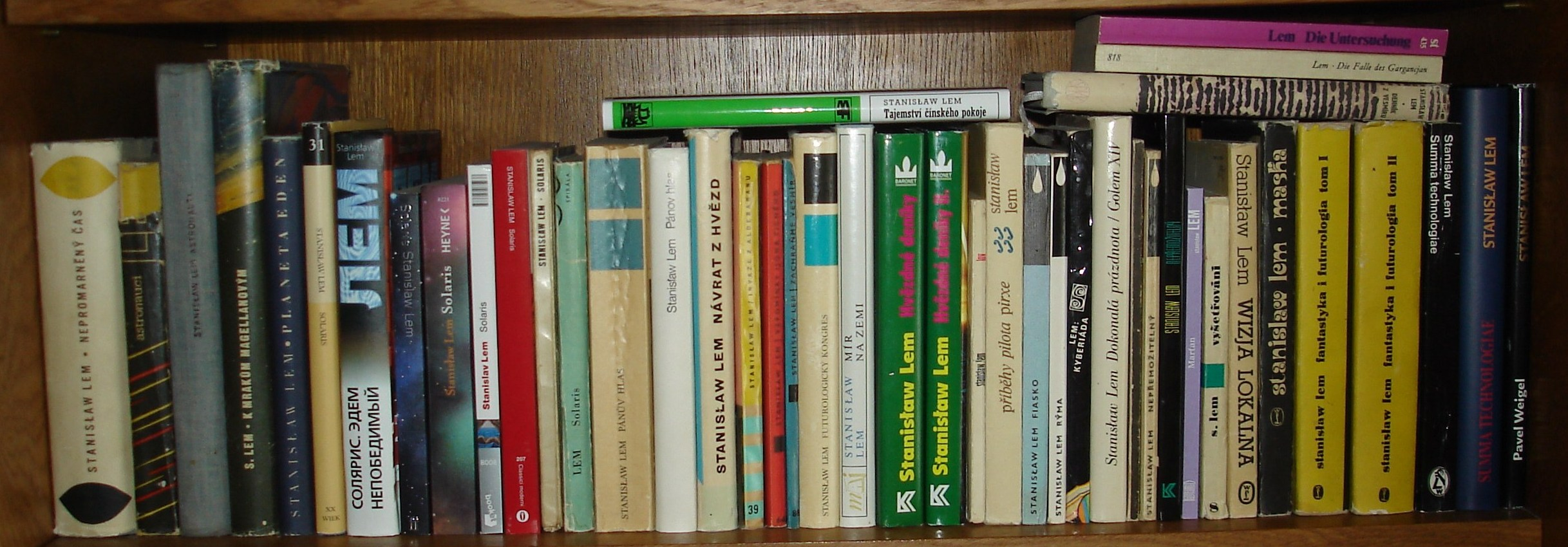
Some of Lem's works in 9 languages

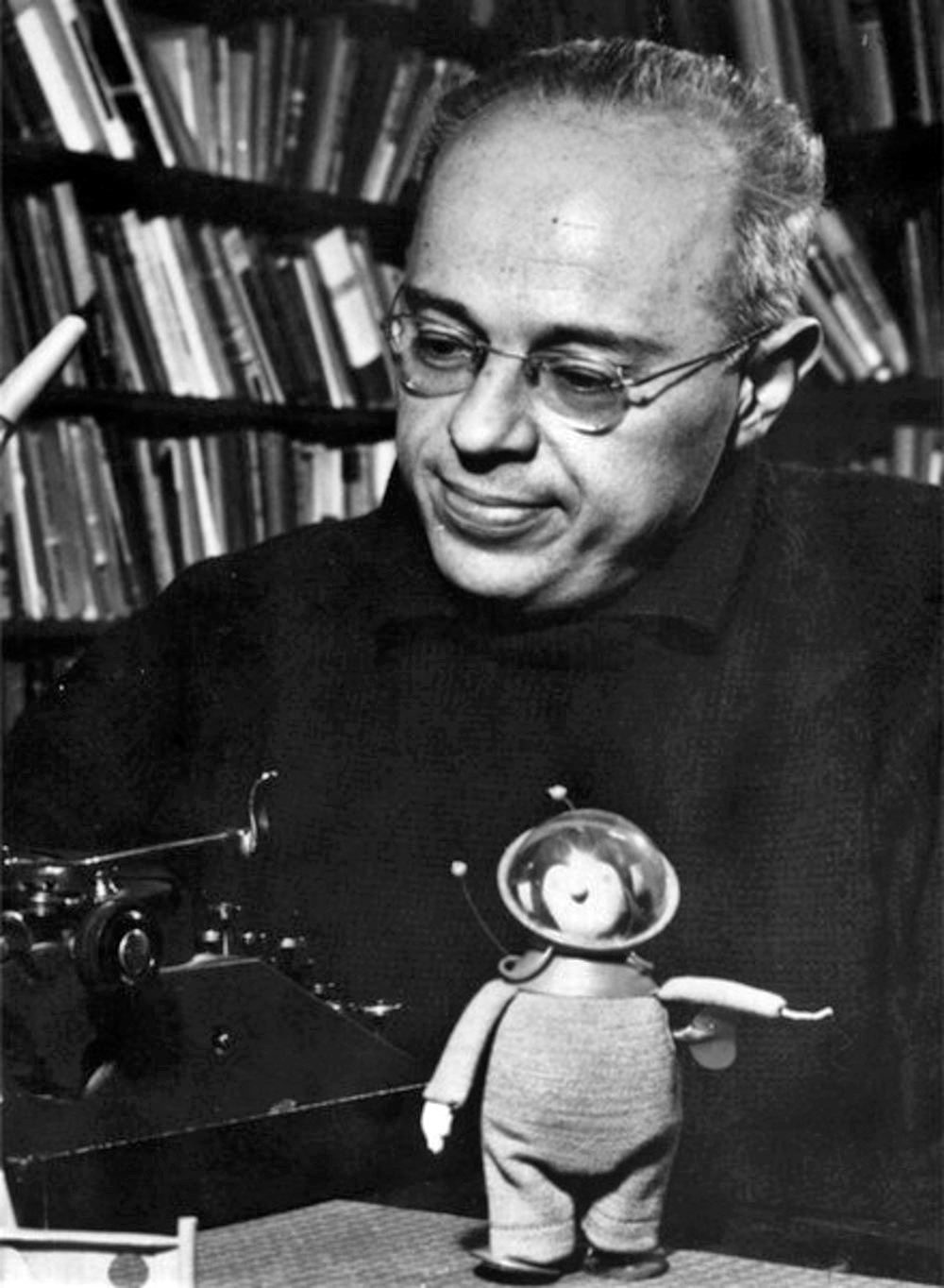

Stanisław Lem was a Polish science fiction writer. His works have been translated into 40 languages and over 30 million copies have been sold.

== Fiction ==
=== Individual works ===
- The Man from Mars (1946) – short novel, originally published in a magazine serial form. In 2009 for the first time a long excerpt from Chapter 1 was translated into English by Peter Swirski and published, with permission of Lem's family, in the online literary magazine Words Without Borders.
- Hospital of the Transfiguration (1948) – partly autobiographical novella about a doctor working in a Polish asylum during World War II, centred on a German Nazi euthanasia program Action T4. It was published in expanded form in 1955 as Czas nieutracony: Szpital przemienienia, and translated into English by William Brand (San Diego: Harcourt Brace Jovanovich, 1988). In Poland it was made into a film in 1979.
- The Astronauts (1951) – young adult science fiction novel. In the early 21st century, it is discovered that the Tunguska meteorite was a crash of a reconnaissance ship from Venus, bound to invade the Earth. A spaceship sent to investigate finds that Venusians killed themselves in an atomic war first. It was made into a film in 1960 (Der Schweigende Stern) as a German/Japanese co-production that was translated into English as First Spaceship on Venus. The novel has never been translated into English.
- The Magellanic Cloud (1955) – the first interstellar travel of mankind to the Alpha Centauri system. Not translated into English.
- Eden (1959) – science fiction novel; after crashing their spaceship on the planet Eden, the crew discovers it is populated with an unusual society. Translated into English by Marc E. Heine (San Diego: Harcourt Brace Jovanovich, 1989).
- The Hunt (1950s) – short story, found in Lem's archives and published in 2018.
- The Investigation (1959) – philosophical mystery novel. Translated by Adele Milch (New York: The Seabury Press, 1974). The book was made into a short film of the same name by Marek Piestrak in 1973.
- Memoirs Found in a Bathtub (1961) – Kafkaesque novel set in the distant future about a secret agent, whose mission in an unnamed ministry is so secret that no one can tell him what it is. Translated by Michael Kandel and Christine Rose (New York: The Seabury Press, 1973)
- Return from the Stars (1961) – science fiction novel. An astronaut returns to Earth after a 127-year long mission. Translated by Barbara Marszal and Frank Simpson (New York: Harcourt Brace Jovanovich, 1980)
- Solaris (1961) – science fiction novel. The crew of a remote space station is strangely influenced by the living ocean occupying a whole planet while they attempt communication with it. Translated into English from the French translation by Joanna Kilmartin and Steve Cox (New York, Walker & Co., 1970; London: Faber and Faber, 1970). Also translated by Bill Johnston in 2014. Made into two Russian films in 1968 and 1972, and an American film in 2002.
- The Invincible (1964) – a hard science fiction novel credited with introducing nanotechnology into the genre. The crew of a space cruiser searches for a disappeared ship on the planet Regis III, discovering swarms of insect-like micromachines. Translated from German by Wendayne Ackerman (New York: The Seabury Press, 1973). Also translated by Bill Johnston in 2014. Adapted into a video game in 2023.
- His Master's Voice (1968) – science fiction novel about the effort to translate an extraterrestrial transmission. Translated by Michael Kandel (San Diego: Harcourt Brace Jovanovich, 1983).
- The Futurological Congress (1971) – an Ijon Tichy novella, published in the collection Bezsenność (Insomnia) and Ze wspomnień Ijona Tichego. Translated by Michael Kandel and published as a standalone novella. (New York: The Seabury Press, 1974).
- The Chain of Chance (1976) – borderline SF novel. A former US astronaut is sent to Italy to investigate a series of mysterious deaths. Translated by Louis Iribarne (New York: Harcourt Brace Jovanovich, 1978).
- Golem XIV (1981) – science novel. Expansion of an essay/story from the collection Imaginary Magnitude.
- Observation on the Spot (1982) – Ijon Tichy novel about the planet Entia. Not translated into English.
- Peace on Earth (1985) – Ijon Tichy novel. A callosotomised Tichy returns to Earth, trying to reconstruct the events of his recent visit to the Moon. Translated by Michael Kandel and Elinor Ford (New York: Harcourt Brace, 1994).
- Fiasco (1986) – dystopian science fiction novel about an expedition to communicate with an alien civilization that results in a major fiasco. Translated by Michael Kandel (San Diego: Harcourt Brace Jovanovich, 1987)

=== Compilations ===
- Sesame and Other Stories (1955) – linked collection of short fiction, dealing with time machines used to clean up Earth's history in order to be accepted into intergalactic society. Not translated into English.
- The Star Diaries (1957–1971) – collection of short fiction dealing with the voyages of Ijon Tichy. English translations of some stories were published in two volumes: the first, The Star Diaries, by Michael Kandel (New York: The Seabury Press, 1976) and the second, Memoirs of a space traveler: further reminiscences of Ijon Tichy, by Joel Stern and Maria Swiecicka-Ziemianek (New York: Harcourt Brace Jovanovich, 1982).
- The Invasion from Aldebaran (1959) – collection of nine science fiction stories, among them three Tales of Pirx the Pilot and Darkness and Mold, about the creation of Whisteria Cosmolytica which is described as "a microbe annihilating matter and drawing its vital energy from that process", creating a grey goo scenario.
- The Cyberiad (1965) – collection of humorous baroque-style stories about the exploits of Trurl and Klapaucius, "constructors" among robots. The stories of Douglas Adams have been compared to the Cyberiad. Transl. by Michael Kandel (New York: The Seabury Press, 1974).
- A Perfect Vacuum (1971) – collection of reviews of fictional books. Transl. by Michael Kandel. (New York: Harcourt Brace Jovanovich, 1979).
- Imaginary Magnitude (1973) – collection of introductions to nonexistent books. Also includes Golem XIV, a lengthy essay/short story on the nature of intelligence delivered by an eponymous US military computer. In the personality of Golem XIV, Lem with a great amount of humor describes an ideal of his own mind. Transl. by Marc E. Heine (San Diego: Harcourt Brace Jovanovich, 1984).
- Tales of Pirx the Pilot (1973) – collection of linked short fiction involving the career of astronaut Pirx. English translations of some stories were published in two volumes: the first, Tales of Pirx the Pilot, by Louis Iribarne (New York: Harcourt Brace Jovanovich, 1979) and the second, More Tales of Pirx the Pilot by Louis Iribarne, Magdalena Majcherczyk and Michael Kandel (San Diego: Harcourt Brace Jovanovich, 1982).
- Mortal Engines (1977) – also contains The Hunt from Tales of Pirx the Pilot, and eleven of the Fables for Robots series. Selected translation by Michael Kandel (New York: The Seabury Press, 1977).
- The Cosmic Carnival of Stanisław Lem – edited with commentary by Michael Kandel. New York: Continuum, 1981. Includes:
  - The Condor from The Invincible (trans. from German by Wendayne Ackerman)
  - Excerpt from "Solaris" (trans. from French by Joanna Kilmartin and Steve Cox)
  - The Test (trans. from Polish by Louis Iribarne)
  - Chapter Seven of "Return from the Stars" (trans. from Polish by Barbara Marszal and Frank Simpson)
  - Excerpt from "The Futurological Congress" (trans. from Polish by Michael Kandel)
  - Two Monsters (trans. from Polish by Michael Kandel)
  - The Second Sally (trans. from Polish by Michael Kandel)
  - Tale of the Computer That Fought a Dragon (trans. from Polish by Michael Kandel)
  - The History of Zipperupus
  - The Star Diaries: The Seventh Voyage (trans. from Polish by Michael Kandel)
  - The Star Diaries: The Fourteenth Voyage (trans. from Polish by Michael Kandel)
  - Les Robinsonades (trans. from Polish by Michael Kandel)
- Provocation (1984) – contains two faux reviews. Not translated into English.
- One Human Minute (Biblioteka XXI wieku - lit. Library of 21st century, 1986) – 3 more fictional reviews (trans. from Polish by Catherine S. Leach)
- The Riddle. Stories (1996) – collection of short stories. Not translated into English.
- The Fantastical Lem (2001) – short stories collection. Not translated into English.
- Lemistry: a celebration of the work of Stanisław Lem. Edited by Ra Page. A collection of three translated short works by Lem (The Lilo; Darkness and Mildew; The Invasion from Aldebaran) and works by other authors but inspired by Lem. (2011).
- The Truth and Other Stories (2022) – short stories collection, translated by Antonia Lloyd-Jones. Includes:
  - The Hunt (late 1950s)
  - Rat in the Labyrinth (1956)
  - Invasion from Aldebaran (1959)
  - The Friend (1959)
  - The Invasion (1959)
  - Darkness and Mildew (1959)
  - The Hammer (1959)
  - Lymphater's Formula (1961), a short story on artificial intelligence making humanity obsolete
  - The Journal (1962)
  - The Truth (1964)
  - One Hundred and Thirty-Seven Seconds (1976)
  - An Enigma (1993)

== Nonfiction ==
Unless noted, not translated into English

- Dialogi (Dialogs 1957) – Non-fiction work of philosophy. First section translated into English by Frank Prengel as Dialogs. Dialog 1 (On Nuclear Resurrection). Complete translation by Peter Butko in 2021, published by MIT Press.
- Wejście na orbitę (Going into Orbit, 1962)
- Summa Technologiae (1964) - Philosophical essay. Partially translated into English.
- Wysoki zamek (1966) – Autobiography of Lem's childhood in the interbellum Lwow. Translated into English as Highcastle: A Remembrance by Michael Kandel (New York: Harcourt Brace, 1995)
- Filozofia Przypadku (The Philosophy of Chance, 1968) – Nonfiction
- Fantastyka i futurologia (Science Fiction and Futurology 1970) – Critiques on science fiction. Two chapters were translated into English in the magazine Science Fiction Studies in 1973-1975 and later included in the collection Microworlds: Writings on Science Fiction and Fantasy, ed. Franz Rottensteiner (San Diego : Harcourt Brace Jovanovich, 1984). Includes two important essays on Philip K. Dick.
- Conversations with Stanisław Lem, (pl:Rozmowy ze Stanisławem Lemem, Stanisław Bereś, Wydawnictwo Literackie Kraków, 1987, ISBN 83-08-01656-1)
- Rozprawy i szkice (Essays and drafts, 1975) - collection of essays on science, science fiction, and literature in general
- Lube czasy (Pleasant Times, 1995)
- Dziury w całym (Looking for Problems, 1995)
- Tajemnica chińskiego pokoju (Mystery of the Chinese Room, 1996) – Collection of essays on the impact of technology on everyday life.
- Sex Wars (1996) - essays
- Dyskusje ze Stanisławem Lemem M. Szpakowska, Discussions with Stanisław Lem, Warszawa 1996
- Bomba megabitowa (The Megabit Bomb, 1999) – Collection of essays about the potential downside of technology, including terrorism and artificial intelligence.
- World on the Brink, 2000) interviews of Tomasz Fiałkowski with Lem
- Okamgnienie (A Blink of an Eye, 2000) – Collection of essays on technological progress since the publication of Summa Technologiae
- Thus Spoke... Lem (pl:Tako rzecze... Lem, 2002) – Interviews with Lem.
- Mój pogląd na literaturę (My View of Literature, 2003)
- Krótkie zwarcia (Short Circuits, 2004) - Essays
- Lata czterdzieste. Dyktanda. (The 40s. Dictations, 2005) – Lem's works from the 1940s
- Rasa drapieżców. Teksty ostatnie (The Predator Race 2006) – the last book of Stanislaw Lem contains actual feuilletons about art, politic and social problems from Polish press "Tygodnik Powszechny".
- Boli tylko, gdy się śmieję... Listy i rozmowy, (It Only Hurts When I Laugh... Letters and Conversations) Stanisław Lem, Ewa Lipska, Tomasz Lem, ebook, 2018, ISBN 978-83-08-06692-8, Wydawnictwo Literackie
  From book description: "... Contains records of conversations the poet and the writer had in early 21st century, as well as the letters which Ewa Lipska exchanged with Stanisław Lem's son when he studied in the United States. The book is adorned with numerous photos."

== Adaptations ==
=== Dramatic adaptations ===
- Der Schweigende Stern (literally The Silent Star, shown in USA as First Spaceship on Venus, German Democratic Republic – Poland 1960), loosely based on The Astronauts
- Profesor Zazul, Poland 1962, directed by Marek Nowicki and Jerzy Stawicki.
- Przekładaniec (Layer Cake/Roly Poly, 1968, by Andrzej Wajda)
- Ikarie XB-1 (in USA as White Planet or Voyage to the End of the Universe, Czechoslovakia 1963) – loosely based on The Magellanic Cloud, uncredited
- Solaris (Соля́рис 1968) - by Boris Nirenburg (USSR). TV play based on the novel Solaris
- Solaris (1972, by Andrei Tarkovsky)
- Pirx kalandjai (1973, Hungarian TV)
- Test pilota Pirxa or Дознание пилота Пиркса (from Pirx story "The Inquest", joint Soviet (Ukrainian-Estonian)-Polish production 1978, directed by Marek Piestrak)
- Szpital przemienienia (Hospital of the Transfiguration, 1979, by Edward Zebrowski)
- Victim of the Brain (1988, by Piet Hoenderdos) includes adaptation of the story "The Seventh Sally" from The Cyberiad
- Marianengraben (1994, directed by Achim Bornhak, written by Lem and Mathias Dinter)
- Solaris (2002, by Steven Soderbergh)
- Ijon Tichy: Raumpilot (2007), German TV (ZDF) miniseries, 6 episodes, directed by Oliver Jahn, after his student's film from 1998.
  - the authors of Ijon Tichy: Raumpilot, created two short films Aus den Sterntagebüchern des Ijon Tichy [From the Star Diaries of Ijon Tichy] (1999) and Aus den Sterntagebüchern des Ijon Tichy II (2000). The former won the audience award at the Hamburg International Short Film Festival in 1999.
- 1 (2008, by Pater Sparrow)
- Solaris 29 July 2007, BBC Radio 4 Classic Serial radio play adaptation, 2 one-hour episodes, adapted by Hattie Naylor, produced by Polly Thomas.
- Thirty-Minute Theatre: Roly Poly (1969) - by Michael Hart (Great Britain), scenario of one part was based on the story "Do you exist Mr Jones?"
- Maska (2010 film) ("The Mask", 2010), directed by the Brothers Quay, based on Lem's short story of the same title
- The Congress (2013), directed by Ari Folman

=== Musical adaptations ===
- The Cyberiad (1970; 2nd version 1985), an opera by Krzysztof Meyer; broadcast by Polish Television (1st act, 1971), staged in Wuppertal (Germany) (1986)
- Solaris (2010-2012) (2012), an opera by Detlev Glanert, libretto by Reinhard Palm, staged in Bregenz (Germany) (2012)
- Texts by Lem were set to music by Esa-Pekka Salonen in his 1982 piece, Floof.

=== Videogame adaptations ===
- The Invincible

== See also ==
- Bibliography of Stanisław Lem
