= Robots in the works of Stanisław Lem =

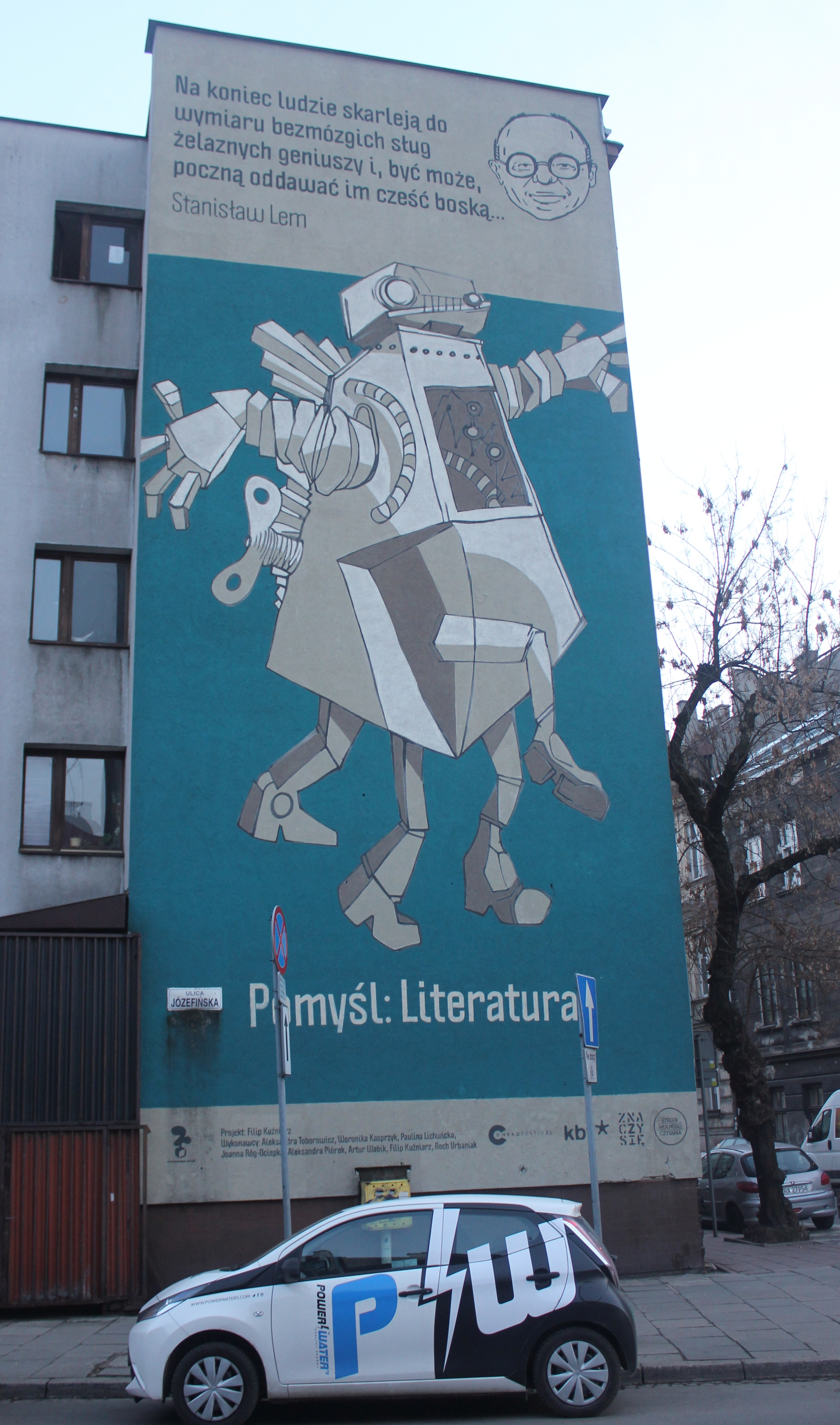
A mural by Filip Kużniarz in Kraków

Robotic life is a frequent topic in the works of Stanisław Lem. Lem's robots are most prominently featured in his two closely related and partly overlapping cycles, Fables for Robots and The Cyberiad.

== Fabular robots ==
Fables for Robots is a series of satirical fairy tales set in a universe populated entirely by robots, with robot kings, robot peasants, robot knights, and robot scientists; a robot damsel in distress is pestered by a robot dragon, robot dogs have robot fleas, etc. The series The Cyberiad belongs to the same grotesque cross-genre of fairy tale and science fiction. Its main protagonists are robots-"constructors" Trurl and Klapaucius, who are something of both sorcerers and engineers.

The images of grotesque, absurd fabular robots of Lem are created by Polish illustrator Daniel Mróz.

== "Realistic" robots ==
Robots of different kind are major characters in several stories from Lem's Tales of Pirx the Pilot cycle, as well as in some occasional stories, such as The Mask. In the afterword to the Tales of Pirx the Pilot, Jerzy Jarzębski makes a paradoxical observation: any infusion of "humanness" into a robot leads to its demise. In '"The Accident" the robot falls from a mountain to a crash apparently behaving as an mountaineer trying to prove himself. In The Hunt the hunted robot gets itself killed because it apparently tries to protect Pirx seeing him as its ally against the hunters who shoot (by an error) at Pirx. The Mask is even more multifaceted in this respect. In "Terminus" a repair robot gets somehow imprinted with the messages exchanged by a suffocating crew of the crashed spaceship and behaves as if it has a PTSD. Pirx tries to rationalize robot's behavior, but being unable to overcome his eerie feelings, he eventually decides to scrap it, despite the fact that the robot still correctly carries out its repairer duties. In the story "The Inquest" the android pilot, otherwise a perfect machine, acquires a truly humane pride and vanity, and attempts to make an "optimal" decision to show its superiority over humans.

An ultimate evolution of military robotics is described in the novel The Invincible, where a human crew is defeated by a swarm of microrobots evolved by natural selection in the course of wars waged by robots. The idea was pursued by Lem further in his fictitious review "Weapon Systems of the Twenty First Century or The Upside-down Evolution".

== Bibliography ==
- "The Hunt" (1950s Stanisław Lem short story)
- "Faithful Robot", (1961), a comedy/mystery/drama science fiction TV play
- In the 1963 short story "Tragedia pralnicza" ("Washer Tragedy") from the memoirs of Ijon Tichy (Ze wspomnień Ijona Tichego), a rat race of the competition among washing machine manufacturers, Nuddlegg and Snodgrass corporations construct progressively smarter washer robots, which gradually acquire wider and wider legal rights as intelligent entities, which leads to all kinds of legal perplexities.
- The Invincible (1964)
- "The Sanatorium of Dr. Vliperdius" ["Zakład doktora Vliperdiusa"] (1964, translated into English in the collection Mortal Engines), about a mental asylum for robots
- A fabular universe of robots
  - Fables for Robots (1964)
  - The Cyberiad (1965)
- "The Mask"
- From the Tales of Pirx the Pilot:
  - "The Accident"
  - "The Inquest"; for plot summary, see Inquest of Pilot Pirx, a 1978 film
  - "Terminus"
  - "The Hunt" (different from the 1950s story)

Lem also wrote about intelligent machines other than robots

- Golem XIV, a lecture course given by a superintelligent computer
- Summa Technologiae (1964), a book-length essay contains Chapter 4: "Intellectronics", a term coined by Lem to speculate on the field that is known today as artificial intelligence.

== In popular culture ==
A mural in Kraków depicts a typical grotesque fabular robot, with a quotation from Dialogs: "Eventually the humans will dwarf down to the level of brainless servants of iron geniuses and may be even start to worship them as Gods". The mural was created by Filip Kużniarz in 2012.

An elaborate interactive robot-themed Google Doodle inspired by the illustrations of Daniel Mróz of The Cyberiad was created for the 60th anniversary of Lem's first published book: The Astronauts.
