= Trurl and Klapaucius =

Fictional robots-constructors from the stories of Stanislaw Lem

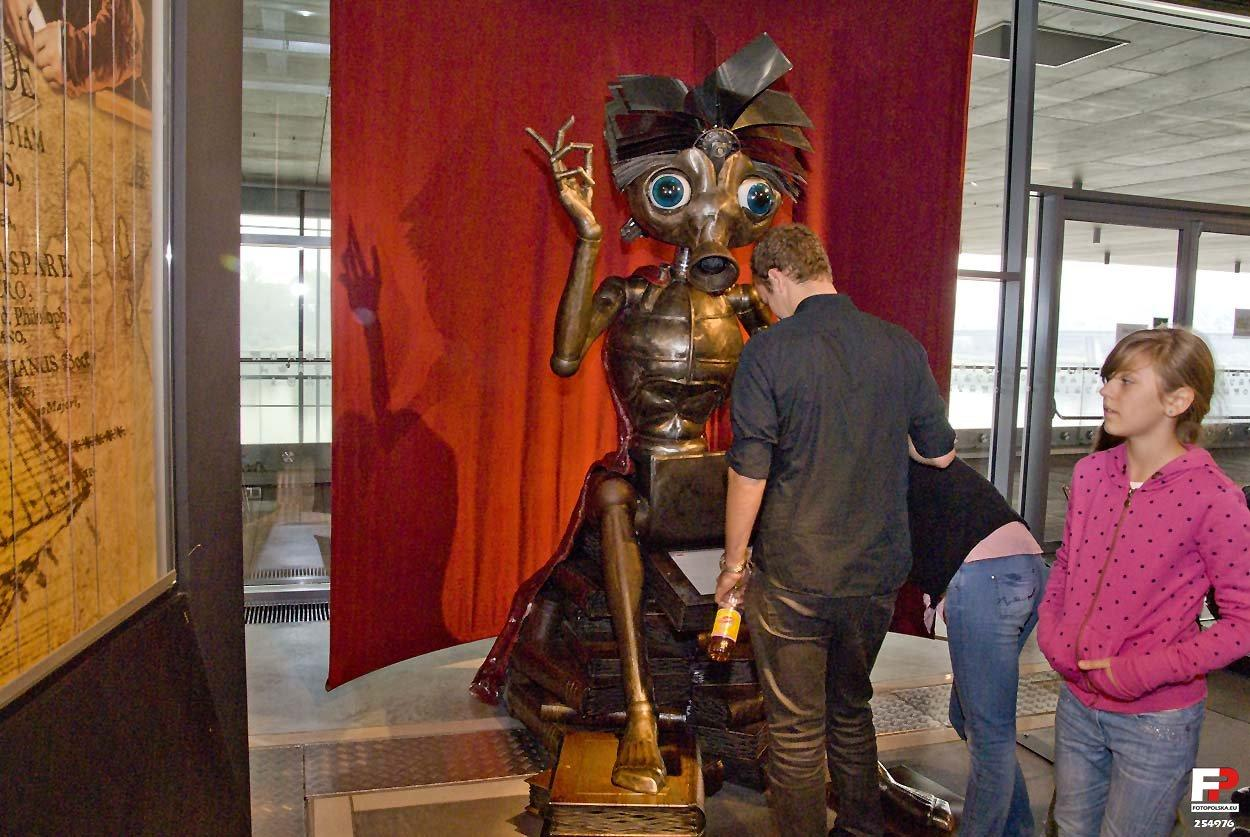
Trurl's invention: electronic bard Elektrybałt at the Copernicus Science Centre: you type some words, and Elektrybałt makes up a poetic work in the specified genre.

Trurl and Klapaucius are the main protagonists of the humorous science fiction short stories of the Cyberiad series written by Polish writer Stanisław Lem. They are two robots who are constructors, who travel the galaxy, designing and building fantastic machines, either on order, or of their own fancy. Their first appearance was in 1964, in a different, albeit similar series, Fables for Robots.

That they are robots is not stated anywhere directly, but is revealed through hints. For example, in the story "Altruizine" Trurl utters: "I, however, made bold to remind him of the solidarity of all thinking beings and the necessity of aiding our organic brothers". The illustrations of Daniel Mroz, however, leave no room for doubt.

In the tandem, Trurl is a more enthusiastic, daring, and industrious one, spearheading most of the endeavors of the team, which, unfortunately nearly always end in disasters on a lesser or larger scale. Klapaucius is as a genius as Trurl is, but he is Trurl's opposite: a cautious pessimist, who tries to discourage Trurl, without much success, and helps the latter to fix (if possible) the disasters created by implementations of Trurl's ideas.

Both of them are bearers of the Diploma of Perpetual Omnipotence. From the story "The Dragons of Probability" it is known that "Trurl and Klapaucius were former pupils of the great Cerebron of Umptor, who for forty-seven years in the School of Higher Neantical Nillity expounded the General Theory of Dragons."

== See also ==
- Robots of Stanisław Lem
