= Pavel Gililov =

Russian classical pianist

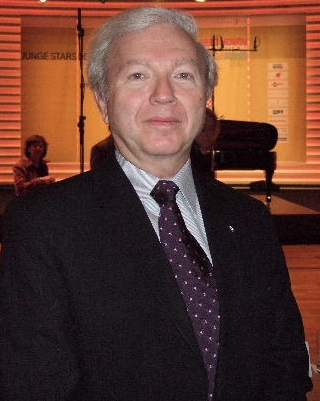
Pavel Gililov (2007)

Pavel Lvovich Gililov (Russian: Павел Львович Гилилов; born 23 June 1950) is a Ukrainian classical pianist who has held German citizenship since 2003.

== Life ==
Born in Donezk, Gililov's musical talent was discovered by the Russian composer Dmitry Kabalevsky. He completed his studies both in piano performance and Lied piano at the Saint Petersburg Conservatory with distinction. While still a student, he won the 1972 Moscow National Piano Competition and was eventually the 4th prize winner of the 1975 International Chopin Piano Competition in Warsaw. He was also a laureate of the International Viotti Piano Competition in Vercelli in 1978.

Gililov emigrated in 1978 from the former Soviet Union first to Austria and finally to Germany.

He performs both as a soloist and as a chamber musician, is a member of the Berlin Philharmonic Piano Quartet and works with numerous well-known soloists such as Boris Pergamenschikow, Mischa Maisky and Viktor Tretiakov. He has appeared at prestigious music festivals, including the Schleswig-Holstein Music Festival, the Salzburg Festival and the Edinburgh Music Festival.

From 1982 until his retirement in 2013, Gililov was professor of piano at the Hochschule für Musik Köln. He is also a visiting professor at the Internationale Sommerakademie Mozarteum Salzburg and in 2005 founded the International Telekom Beethoven Competition Bonn, of which he is artistic director and jury president. Since 2007 he has been a professor at the Mozarteum University Salzburg.

He also gives numerous piano master classes in Japan, Germany, Austria and Switzerland, such as the Summer Classics in the Mayen/Koblenz district, of which he was artistic director from 1997 to 2009, or the Summer Academy in Lausanne for violin sonatas with piano together with Pierre Amoyal.

== Recordings ==
- Johannes Brahms: Sonatas for Violoncello and Piano among others (with Mischa Maisky);
- Johann Nepomuk Hummel: Sonata for Violoncello and Piano (with Boris Pergamenschikow), Flute Trio op.78 (with Andras Adorjan and Boris Pergamenschikow).
- Richard Strauss: Sonata for Violoncello and Piano op.6 and Hans Pfitzner: Sonata for Violoncello and Piano op.1 (with Walter Nothas)
- Sergei Prokofiev: Sonatas for violin and piano among others (with Dmitry Sitkovetsky)
- Frédéric Chopin: Ballades 1–4, Fantasy in F minor, op. 49
- Krzysztof Meyer: Piano Concerto; Trio for Clarinet, Violoncello and Piano (with Eduard Brunner and Ivan Monighetti)

== Students ==
- Federico Colli
- Soo Jung Ann
- Birke J. Bertelsmeier
- Oliver Drechsel
- Andreas Frölich
- Alexander Gadjiev
- Peter Adrian Grauer
- Friedrich Höricke
- Ingmar Lazar
- Leo de María
- Sophie Pacini
- Olga Scheps
- Christian Seibert
- Henri Sigfridsson
- Annette Volkamer
