= Cyberiada (opera) =

1986 opera by Krzysztof Meyer

- Opera by Krzysztof Meyer
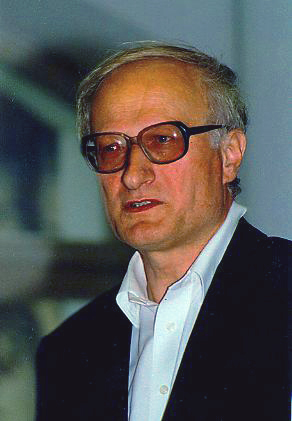
- Krzysztof Meyer, the composer of Cyberiada
- Other title: Kyberiade
- Librettist: Krzysztof Meyer
- Language: Polish; German
- Based on: The Cyberiad, short stories by Stanisław Lem
- Premiere: 11 May 1986; Opernhaus Wuppertal

Cyberiada (also known by its German title Kyberiade) is an opera in three acts (11 scenes) composed by Krzysztof Meyer to a Polish-language libretto by the composer himself, based on The Cyberiad, a series of science fiction short stories by Stanisław Lem. It won the Grand Prix of the Prince Pierre of Monaco composers' competition in 1970 and was first performed in its entirety on 11 May 1986 at the Opernhaus Wuppertal.

== Background and performance history ==
Meyer's first (and only) opera, Cyberiada was composed between 1967 and 1970. The composer himself wrote the libretto which is based on Stanisław Lem's The Cyberiad, a darkly comic series of science fiction short stories. The revolutionary approach by Meyer in terms of music included the incorporation of chance into the process of creation known as aleatoricism, and the use of sonorism in orchestration, based on inventing new types of sounds on individual instruments. The opera won the Grand Prix of the Prince Pierre of Monaco composers' competition in 1970. The first act was premiered on Polish television in 1971. The first complete performance of the work took place at the Opernhaus Wuppertal on 11 May 1986 conducted by Jean-François Monnard. On that occasion, it was performed as Kyberiade in a German translation by Jörg Morgener (pseudonym of Jürgen Köchel). The stage director was Friedrich Meyer-Oertel.

The opera was given its Polish premiere and sung in the original Polish at the Grand Theatre, Poznań, on 25 May 2013 in honour of Meyer's 70th birthday. It was the first time the opera had been revived since its premiere in Wuppertal. The Poznań production was directed by Ran Arthur Braun and conducted by Krzysztof Słowiński, with space-scenography by Justin C. Arienti.

== Roles ==
Role (in German)	translation	Voice type
Der Kosmische Fremde	The stranger from the cosmos	tenor
Trull, Konstrukteur	Trull, constructor of the story-telling machines	bass
Der glänzende Ring	The shining ring	soprano
Königin Genia	Queen Genia	soprano
König Madrilius der Größte, Herrscher der Vielzuvielen	King Madrilius the Greatest, sovereign of the FarTooMany	tenor
Briefräger der Vielzuvielen	Postman of the FarTooMany	mezzo-soprano
Listig, Konstrukteur der Traumschränke	Cunning, constructor of the dream cupboards	baritone
König Voluptatus	King Voluptatus	tenor
Ritter Vinodur	Knight Vinodur	bass
Alte Kyberhexe	Old Cyber Witch	contralto
Greis	Old man	bass
Automatthias	Automatthew	baritone
Im Ohr	In the Ear, a miniature computer	mezzo-soprano and contralto
Drei erzählende Maschinen: Perfekter Ratgeber, E-Advokat, Rechtscomputer	Three story-telling machines: Perfect Advisor, E-Lawyer, Law Computer	speaking voices
Volk der Vielzuvielen	The "FarTooMany" people, subjects of King Madrilius	mixed chorus
Volk der Gewindianer	The "Threaded" people, subjects of King Voluptatus	chorus of basses
Degeneräle	Degenerals, soldiers	chorus of tenors
Detektive	Detectives	male chorus
Prinzessin und junge Tänzerinnen	Princess and young dancer girls	ballet

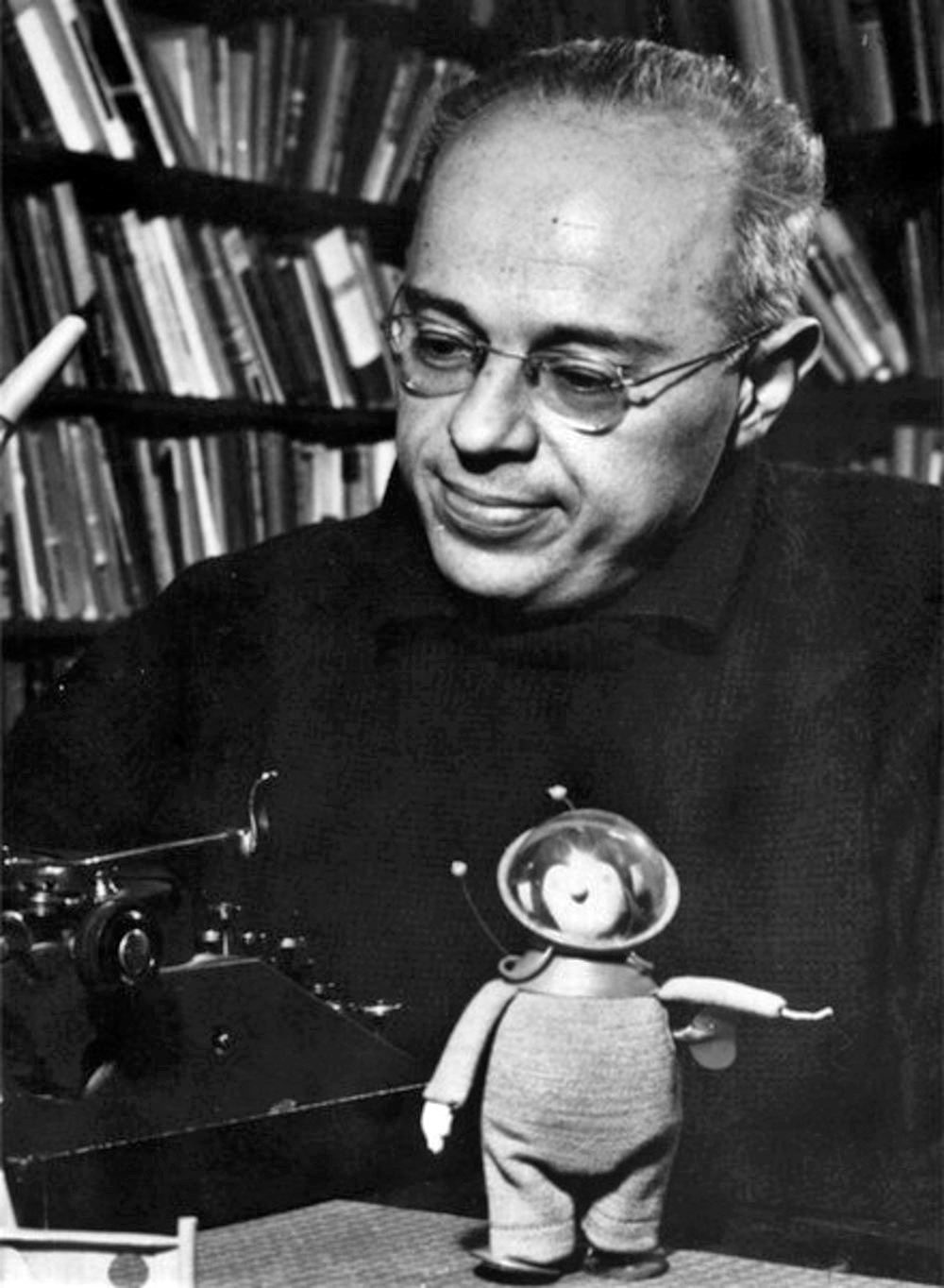
Stanisław Lem, on whose stories the opera is based

== Synopsis ==
The setting of the opera is described in German as "Auf der Erde in der Zukunft, im kybernetischen Zeitalter" (On Earth in the future, in the cybernetic era). The libretto follows the "nested stories" ("nested fairy tales") format, with the internal stories corresponding to Lem's original texts.

Queen Genia (Genialina) suffers from melancholy. To cheer herself up, she asks her android Trull (a robotic engineer and a powerful supercomputer, a counterpart of Lem's Trurl) to construct robots who can invent fairytales for her amusement. Three machines each entertain her by telling a different story. This is where fairytales inside a tale begin. However, Trull makes sure that he himself is featured in every one of them.

The first story recounts how Trull builds a supercomputer for Mondrylion (the name is kind of "Smarty-boots" in Polish, named Mandrilius in the German version), the King of the FarTooMany folk. When the King tries to get his new computer to destroy Trull, the wily engineer saves himself by a clever trick.

The second story recounts how the subject of King Voluptatus (Król Rozporyk in Polish, i.e. Zipperupus), a constructor named Chytrian (Listig in German), tries to get rid of him because he has completely lost touch with reality after spending too much time in special giant cupboards which generate erotic dreams.

The third story recounts how Automatthias loses his faith in computers after being shipwrecked on a deserted island. He can find no way to escape, even with help of his miniature computer named "Im Ohr" ("In the Ear"). By the time he is eventually rescued, he has become a lifelong foe of technology.

The final insight resulting from these "ironic utopian reflections" on human existence is that only wisdom and truth can save the world, not the pursuit of progress, perfection, and wealth. In the finale, Trull kills a clone of himself.
