= Peter Adrian Grauer =

German classical pianist

Peter Adrian Grauer (born 20 April 1969) is a German-Hungarian concert pianist and piano teacher

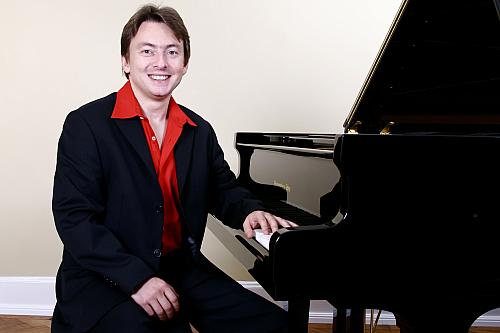
Peter Adrian Grauer

== Career ==
Grauer was born in Târgu Mureș, Romania. he received his first piano lessons at the age of six at the music school for the highly gifted in his hometown of Târgu Mureș. At a young age, he gave his first concerts on Romanian radio and television and was invited to record in studios. At the age of 14, he won 1st prize in the Romanian "Ciprian Porumbescu" competition.

In 1983, he moved to Germany and settled in Aachen, where he graduated from the Anne-Frank-Gymnasium Aachen in 1989. While still at grammar school, he was a junior student in Pavel Gililov's class at the Hochschule für Musik und Tanz Köln. He laid the foundation for his career as a concert pianist by participating in international master classes (1986-1994) with Zoltán Kocsis, György Cziffra, Eliza Hansen, Christoph Eschenbach, Karl-Heinz Kämmerling and Rudolf Buchbinder, among others.

In addition to chamber music and song accompaniment recitals in German concert halls, Grauer performed in other European countries, in America and in Asia. Highlights included a concert at the 1994 Schleswig-Holstein Music Festival, a tour of Japan with a total of ten concerts (1999) and two concert series in the United States (2009 and 2011).

Grauer's repertoire covers different musical epochs. The focus is on the works of Beethoven, Chopin, Grieg, Liszt and Bartók.
