= Andreas Frölich =

German classical pianist

Andreas Frölich (born 1963) is a German pianist and teacher at the Hochschule für Musik und Tanz Köln.

== Life ==
After leaving school, Frölich studied piano with Vitaly Margulis at the Hochschule für Musik Freiburg and with Pavel Gililov at the Musikhochschule Köln. After graduating as a concert pianist and winning prizes at major competitions, Frölich subsequently took up a busy concert schedule at home and abroad, which took him to the major stages in Europe and also to South America, South Africa, Japan and Australia, among other places. He has also been invited to perform at the Rheingau Musik Festival, the Schleswig-Holstein Music Festival, the Salzburg Easter Festival, the Mozart Festival Würzburg, the Schubertiade in Roskilde and many others.

As a soloist, he has performed with numerous renowned orchestras such as the Wiener Kammerphilharmonie, the Stuttgarter Kammerorchester, the Württembergisches Kammerorchester Heilbronn, the Deutsche Kammerakademie Neuss, the Münchener Kammerorchester, the Beethoven Orchester Bonn, the Saint Petersburg Philharmonic Orchestra, the Limburgs Symfonie Orkest Maastricht, the Beethoven Orchester Bonn, the Armenian Philharmonic, the Salzburg Chamber Soloists, the Kammerphilharmonie Amadé, the Málaga Concerto, the Kuopio Symphonic Orchestra, as well as with the Tallinn Philharmonic Orchestra, Radio Symphonic Luxembourg, the Rheinische Philharmonie Koblenz, the Orchestre National de Bretagne, the Collegium instrumentale Halle and many others.

One focus of his artistic activity is chamber music. Frölich has performed with the Ensemble Wien, among others, and is currently one of the members of the renowned Mendelsohn Trio Berlin, along with Uta Klöber, violin, and Ramon Jaffé, violoncello. He has recorded more than 30 CDs, some of them award-winning, on labels such as CPO, EMI, BMG, Oehms Classics, VMS and Divox.

In the winter semester of 2006, Frölich accepted an appointment at the Hochschule für Musik und Tanz Köln/Aachen. In 2001 Frölich was also one of the co-founders and artistic directors of the AmadèO Festival in Aachen and the Orpheo concert series in Kerkrade (NL) and Herzogenrath, each of which is presented annually as part of the Euriade Festival by the "Stichting Euriade e.V.". The Stichting Euriade, founded by the philosopher Werner Janssen in 1981, elected Frölich to the executive board and entrusted him with the musical direction of the Euriade Festival. As part of the AmadéO Festival, the Prix amadéo de piano for young pianists was organised on an annual basis, which was renamed the MozARTe International Piano Competition in 2015. Together with Ilya Scheps, he founded the association MozARTe e. V. in 2015 and together with Scheps took over the leadership of this association and the competition jury.

Frölich is a professor at the Hochschule für Musik und Tanz Köln/Aachen. He regularly gives international master classes, including as a guest professor at the Internationale Sommerakademie Mozarteum Salzburg, and is in demand as a juror at numerous international piano competitions. In recent years, his students have won more than 30 prizes (1st and 2nd prizes) at numerous national and international piano competitions.

== Recordings ==
- Andreas Frölich (piano) and Ramon Jaffé (violoncello): "Méditation hébraique" : Music of Jewish composers from three centuries, Koch international, Munich, 1995.
- Piano-Trio Salzburg - Andreas Frölich (piano), Ramon Jaffé (violoncello) and Lavard Skou-Larsen (violin): Enrique Granados: Cello Pieces and Piano Trios, CPO, 1995
- Andreas Frölich (piano) and Ramon Jaffé (violoncello): Johannes Brahms in arrangements by his friends and contemporaries, Koch International, Munich, 1996
- Andreas Frölich (piano) and Ramon Jaffé (violoncello): Heinrich von Herzogenberg: Cello Works and Chamber Music Part II, CPO, 2000
- Andreas Frölich (piano) and Sonja van Beek (violin): Erich Wolfgang Korngold: Complete works for violin and piano, CD-Universe, 2000
- Andreas Frölich (piano) and Sylvia-Elisabeth Viertel (violin): Works for violin and piano, MusiContact Heidelberg, 2000
- Andreas Frölich (piano) and Ensemble Wien: W. A. Mozart: Piano Quartet KV 452, Koch /Schwann 2001
- Andreas Frölich (piano), Sonja van Beek (violin) and Floris Mijnders (violoncello): Beethoven and Brahms : Piano Trios, Signum MusiContact Heidelberg, 2003
- Andreas Frölich (piano) and Ensemble Caméléon Amsterdam: Mozart in the Salon : Piano Concerto KV 415 and Opera in Chamber Music Instrumentation, MusiContact, Heidelberg, 2004
- Andreas Frölich (piano), Stephan Picard (violin) and Ramon Jaffé (violoncello) (Mendelssohn Trio Berlin): Ferdinand Ries : Piano Trios and Piano Quartets; CPO, 2004 and 2005
- Andreas Frölich (piano), Stephan Picard (violin) and Ramon Jaffé (violoncello) (Mendelssohn Trio Berlin): Astor Piazzolla: "Meditango", VMS, Feldkirch, 2006
- Andreas Frölich (piano) and Kammerphilharmonie Amadé, cond: Frieder Obstfeld: W. A. Mozart: Piano Concerto in A major KV 488, VMS, Feldkirch 2006
- Andreas Frölich (piano) and Ramon Jaffé (violoncello): Edvard Grieg: works for violoncello and piano, CPO, 2008
- Andreas Frölich (piano) and Alexander Hülshoff (violoncello): "Musique Hébraique" : Shostakovich, Bloch; VMS, Feldkirch, 2008
- Andreas Frölich (piano), Uta Kunert (violin) and Ramon Jaffé (violoncello) (Mendelssohn Trio Berlin): Johannes Brahms: Piano Trio op.40, Scherzo FAE and 8 Songs; VMS; Feldkirch, 2012
- Andreas Frölich (piano) and Deutsch Niederländische Kammerphilharmonie: W. A. Mozart : Piano Concerto in B flat major KV 595, VMS; Feldkirch 2008.
- Andreas Frölich (piano), Gilles Apap (violin) and delian::quartett: Joseph Haydn: Piano Concerto in G major and Concerto for Violin, Piano and Strings in F major, OEHMS Classics, 2009
- Andreas Frolich (piano): Frédéric Chopin: "Cantabile" (Waltzes, Nocturnes, Prélude, Polonaise ); VMS, Feldkirch 2010
- Andreas Frolich (piano) and Friedemann Eichhorn (violin): Souvenir d' Amérique; works by Gershwin, Vieuxtemps, Korngold, Bloch, Williams, Waxmann, Bragato, Piazzolla, Kroll, Cage a. a., Oehms Classics 2012
- Andreas Frölich: Wolfgang Amadeus Mozart: Piano Concertos KV 238 and 415; Armenian Philharmonic Orchestra, Conductor: Eduard Topchjan; Oehms Classics 2014
