= Ilya Scheps =

Russian classical pianist

Ilja Scheps (born 1956) is a Russian pianist living in Germany and professor at the Hochschule für Musik und Tanz Köln, Department Aachen.

== Life and career ==
Scheps studied piano at the Moscow Conservatory, where he was later taken on as a teacher. Between 1982 and 1992, he performed mainly as a soloist with the Moscow Philharmonic Orchestra. In the meantime, he has been invited to give guest performances in the US, Australia, China, Israel, Italy, Malta, New Zealand, Spain, Hungary and Turkey.

With the dissolution of the Soviet Union and the founding of the Russian Federation in 1992, Scheps moved to Germany, where he taught as a private lecturer at the Rostock University of Music and Theatre, at the Dortmund department of the Detmold University of Music and at the Akademie für Tonkunst in Darmstadt. In 2003, he became professor of piano and chamber music at the Hochschule für Musik und Tanz Köln, Aachen Department, where he rose to the position of director of the Aachen Department alongside Hans-Werner Huppertz and Claudia Kunz-Eisenlohr.

In addition, he took over the direction of international master class for pianists, including at the Landesmusikakademie NRW, and is also a jury member at internationally renowned competitions. Since 2006, Scheps has headed the international jury of the "Prix amadéo de piano", from 2015 at the MozARTe International Piano Competition, together with his university colleague Andreas Frölich from Aachen, as well as the organisers' association "MozARTE e.V.", which was founded for this purpose and is based in Aachen. He was also a member of the jury at the International Chopin Competition in Darmstadt in 2009 and was nominated as a jury member for the "2nd China Shenzhen International Piano Concerto Competition" of the Goethe-Institut China in Shenzhen in October 2011. In addition, Scheps was appointed visiting professor at several universities in China.

Scheps and his wife Tamara - also a pianist and piano teacher - are the parents of the pianists Olga Scheps and Anna Scheps. Ilya Scheps and his two daughters have performed together on several occasions.

== Recordings ==
- Ilja Scheps (piano) and Sergej B. Jakovenko (baritone): Modest Mussorgski-Songs, Arkiv-Music, 1991
- Ilja Scheps (piano) and Sergej B. Jakovenko (baritone): Valentyn Silvestrov: Stille Lieder, Liederzyklus für Singstimme und Klavier, 2 CDs, Gräfelfing : ECM Records Verlag, Berlin, Universal-Music, 2004
- Ilja Scheps et al.: Nikolai Rimsky-Korsakov: Complete Songs, Classical Music, 2009
