= Anna Scheps =

Russian classical pianist

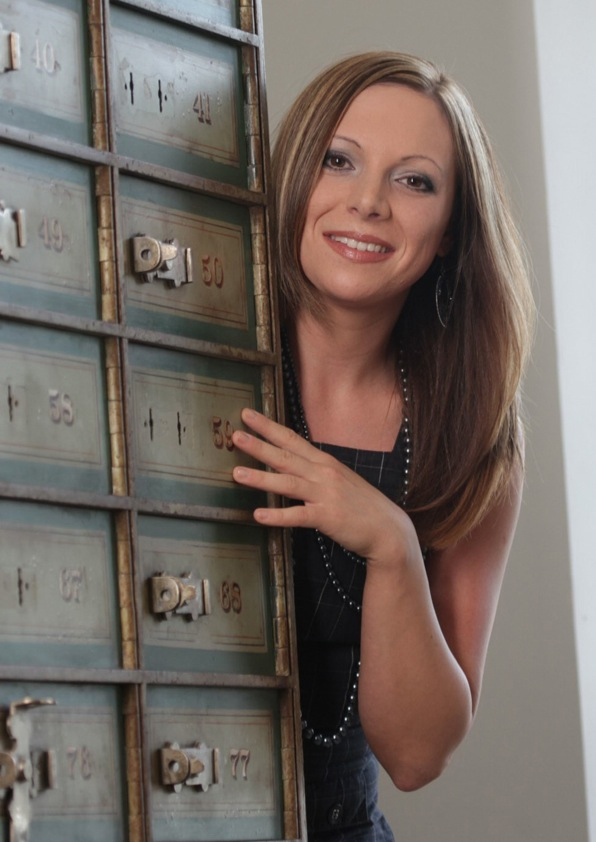
- Anna Scheps in 2012
- Born: 1982 (age 42–43); Moscow, Soviet Union
- Education: Moscow Conservatory
- Occupation: Pianist
- Father: Ilya Scheps

Anna Scheps (born 1982 in Moscow) is a Russian pianist living in Germany.

== Life and career ==
Born in Moscow, Scheps is the daughter of the pianist Ilya Scheps, her younger sister is the pianist Olga Scheps.

Scheps was taught at the Moscow Conservatory at the age of six. After the family moved to Germany in 1992, she initially attended a grammar school in Wuppertal. From 1995 to 1997, she studied at the Yehudi Menuhin School in London with Ruth Nye. In London, she performed at the Wigmore Hall and the Royal Festival Hall. She has been a scholarship holder of the Friedrich Ebert Foundation and the Eduard Arnhold and Max Taut Foundation of the Academy of Arts, Berlin, among others.

From 2000 to 2006, Scheps studied at the Hochschule für Musik Würzburg with Bernd Glemser, graduating with distinction. From 2010 to 2013, she studied again in Glemser's master classes. She also took master classes with Lazar Berman, Dmitri Bashkirov and Bella Davidovich, among others.

Scheps performed in Germany as well as in France, Canada, the US and others. Yehudi Menuhin chose her as soloist for the CD Young Virtuosi, produced on the occasion of his 80th birthday.

Because of her three children, she took a break for several years until 2011. In 2014, she released her first own CD on Genuin classics. In 2015, she became involved in teaching music to school children. Since 2017, she has been touring with the programme "Classic meets Movie", in which she plays classical works as well as film music that she has had arranged for solo piano. Scheps has also appeared on various occasions at charity events.

== Award ==
- 1999: Kulturpreis der Stadt Unna

== Recording ==
- 2014: Dances, Poems, Fairy Tailes. With works by Franz Liszt, Franz Schubert, Sergej Rachmaninow, Manuel de Falla, Frédéric Chopin and Nikolai Medtner. Anna Scheps (piano). Genuin classics.
