= The Mask (Lem short story) =

1974 short story by Stanisław Lem

1976 short story collection, cover art by Barbara Paleta

The Mask (Polish: Maska) is a science fiction techno horror short story by Polish writer Stanisław Lem written in 1974 and first published in literary magazine Kultura that year. It was the title story in a short story collection published in 1976 by Wydawnictwo Literackie. It is a story of an assassin android she-robot programmed both to love and to kill its human target and who gradually becomes aware of herself and her programming.

The story is set in a quasi-feudal world which is not depicted to be technologically advanced. Yet, it is reminiscent of that of the Fables for Robots and The Cyberiad and is written in an archaized language.

The English translation may be found in the collection Mortal Engines.

Initially Lem planned it as a story within a story, in the story Edukacja Cyfrania from the Polish edition of the collection The Cyberiad.

== Plot ==
The protagonist and narrator is a complicated "hound machine", an insectoid robot disguised as a beautiful girl. Her target is high-ranked dissident wise man Arrhodes. She is programmed both to love and to kill Arrhodes. When they see each other at a ball, they both immediately fall in love. When Arrhodes decides to visit her, she transforms from a girl into a mantis-like steel monster. Arrhodes recognizes the "hound machine" and flees, and the pursuit begins.

The robot gradually gains the ability of introspection, becomes aware of her predicament, and struggles to overcome it. Along her path she meets a priest and confesses. The priest asks what she would do when she sees Arrhodes, and she answers she does not know. To that the priest comments that she and he are "equal before the Divine Providence". In other words, the ability to have doubt is a humanizing trait.

The priest tells her that Arrhodes was kidnapped by some villains, and she starts hunting the kidnappers in order to free Arrhodes, still not knowing what she will do to him. When she finally finds him, he is already dying, and she (and readers) will never know what she would have done.

== Discussion ==
The story is unusual in the corpus of Lem's fiction in that it is closer to fantasy rather than to science fiction, although the elements of fantasy may be found elsewhere, e.g., in Fables for Robots and even in Ijon Tichy's Star Diaries.

In the foreword to a 1977 Russian translation of the story Lem wrote that the story has three aspects. First, illustrates the classical philosophical problem of free will simulated within the framework of cybernetics: can a machine which is programmed to do something recognize this programming as something enforced onto it and rebel against it? This is a practical issue of "robot rebellion". Lem writes that in scientific terms it may be stated as "the problem of autodescription of a finite automaton".

Second, it was an attempt to model the above science-fictional situation within a framework not typical for science fiction; hence he framed it as a classic love story in the form of a gothic novel. At the same time he attempted to interpret its elements: "fatal love", "love at first sight", jealousy, etc., based on the current knowledge in cybernetics. For example, love at first sight may be interpreted as the phenomenon of imprinting, only not of biological origin, but as a result of external programming of a robot.

Finally, Lem wrote he wanted to introduce a motif from the genre of fantasy: that of horrible transformation of the heroine. And again, this transformation was to have a rational explanation: it was caused not by a spell, but by a program.

In his comments elsewhere Lem draws a parallel with Solaris: both deal with a non-human entity (Harey, in Solaris and the hound machine in The Mask) which has human impulses and behavior. In the foreword to Mortal Engines, the translator Michael Kandel also draws a parallel with Solaris in that the two are both love story and horror story, with quite a few twists.

The observation on the humanizing ability of having doubts (which made the machine "equal before the Divine Providence" with the priest) is similar to that found in Lem's short story The Inquest, where a human defeats a robot due to his ability to have doubts and hesitate.

Jo Alyson Parker analyzes another aspect of the story: the issue of gender. She points out that Lem's science fiction world is a stereotypically masculine domain, and "The Mask" is one of the few works by Lem with significant female actors. In this respect the female character from the story is similar to Rheya from Solaris in that the female turns out to be an artificial entity. In fact, Lem confessed in an interview that he actually wrote "The Mask" under the impression of Rheya's (Harey's) traits: in particular, as Lem says, "the classical problem of the freedom and non-freedom of the programmed mind". Parker proceeds to interpret the story in terms of phallic aspects, gender language, the programmability of femininity, love, and erotic behavioral cliches, etc.

== Adaptations ==
Based on Lem's short story, in 2010 an animated short film Maska (23 min.) was shot by Polish Se-ma-for studio directed by the Brothers Quay, music by Krzysztof Penderecki. The production was financed in part by the Adam Mickiewicz Institute. In this rendering the robot is beautiful in its both forms: the girl and the machine, while the surrounding human world looks rotten, which fits the mood of the story.

In 2020, during the COVID-19 pandemic, actress and director Hanka Brulińska created a 13-min short Maska, dedicated to the Year of Lem. It is available online for a preview in two parts. Its English-language translation was planned for the worldwide distribution. The Polish Ministry of International Affairs suggested translations in several other languages. Brulińska secured the license for an adaptation several years ago.
