= The Cyberiad =

Sci-fi short story series by Stanisław Lem

- First edition (Polish)
- Author: Stanisław Lem
- Original title: Cyberiada
- Translator: Michael Kandel
- Illustrator: Daniel Mróz
- Language: Polish
- Genre: Science fiction
- Publisher: Wydawnictwo Literackie (Polish); Harcourt Brace (English)
- Publication date: 1965
- Publication place: Poland
- English publication date: 1974
- Media type: Print (paperback)
- Pages: 295
- ISBN: 0-15-623550-1
- OCLC: 11398261
- Dewey Decimal: 891.8/537 19
- LC Class: PG7158.L39 C813 1985

The Cyberiad (Polish: Cyberiada), sometimes subtitled Fables for the Cybernetic Age, is a series of humorous science fiction short stories by Polish writer Stanisław Lem published during 1964–1979. The first collected set of stories was originally published in 1965, with an English translation by Michael Kandel first appearing in 1974.

The main protagonists of the stories are Trurl and Klapaucius, two "constructor" robots who travel the galaxy, constructing fantastic machines. Nearly every character is either a humanoid robot or some sort of intelligent machine, with few living creatures ever appearing. These robots have for the most part organized themselves into proto-feudal societies with strict ranks and structures. The timeline of each story is relatively constrained, with the majority of the individual tales following one or both of the two protagonists as they find and aid civilizations and people in need of their creations, advice, or intervention. Though the thematic content of the stories is broad, most focus on problems of the individual and society, as well as on the vain search for human happiness through technological means.

In 1970, the book was adapted into the opera Cyberiada. Alongside many of Lem's other works, this book has been an inspiration for numerous films and games. There is a steel statue of Elektrybałt, Trurl's legendary electronic bard, in the Copernicus Science Centre, Warsaw.

The Cyberiad shares the peculiar robot's universe, as well as the style, with the cycle Fables for Robots.

Despite its titular status, the word "Cyberiad" refers to nothing in the tales; it is used only once in an ambiguous context by Trurl's Elektrybałt.

== Trurl and Klapaucius ==
Trurl and Klapaucius are "constructors" — brilliant engineers capable of God-like exploits through the machines they build. The two have complete control over the physical laws of the universe; for instance, on one occasion, Trurl creates an entity capable of extracting accurate information from the random motion of gas particles, which he calls a "Demon of the Second Kind", with the "Demon of the First Kind" being Maxwell's demon. In another instance, the two constructors re-arrange stars near their home planet in order to advertise their services. Despite this incredible power, without their machines the two are relatively powerless, and are captured, incapacitated, and physically beaten numerous times.

The duo are both best friends and intellectual rivals. Their adventures consist of both building revolutionary machines at home and travelling the galaxy to aid those in need. Although they are firmly established as fundamentally good and righteous people through their actions, they typically demand payment for their services, usually delivered in the form of precious metals. In one story, when rewards for slaying a dragon are promised and not delivered, Trurl disguises himself in the skin of the dragon to continue harassing the local inhabitants until he can collect his payment. Despite their love of money, they prefer to aid the oppressed and help civilizations reach higher "levels of development" (at least by their own standards.) The machines the two build and the journeys they embark on are the basis for the greater moral lessons of the book.

== The world and its inhabitants ==
Though humans are virtually nonexistent, most intelligent machines are still highly anthropomorphic in nearly every aspect; they are bipedal, divided into two sexes, experience human emotions, and at least appear to be capable of love. Robotic versions of physical and mental disabilities, old age and death, particularly in case of accidents or murder, are also common, though mechanical language is used to describe them. Death is theoretically avoidable through constant repair (and sometimes even reversible), but most machines still carry with them a deep-seated knowledge of their own mortality.

The universe of The Cyberiad is primarily pseudo-medieval, with kingdoms, knights, princesses, and even dragons existing in abundance. The level of technology of the vast majority of kingdoms also mirrors medieval times, with swords, robotic steeds, and gallows widespread. Alongside this, space travel, extremely advanced technology, and futuristic weapons and devices are available. Often the lessons of medieval chivalry are retaught in a way more applicable to the machine age.

== Themes ==
The stories are individually framed as fables, with each having a set of moral themes. These themes include the randomness of existence, the imperfection of the human form, and artificial life.

Aside from the obvious themes about robotics, the work also contains more overt criticisms of the conditions under which it was written, as some stories having directly political messages. Nearly every aristocratic ruler is portrayed as inept or corrupt, ruling over their subjects with brutality and fear. This philosophy was relatively in line with the Soviet view of monarchism. However, contrasting that, a robotic analogue of Karl Marx is also put to death, not because of his ideas, but because he refused to stop attempting to implement his philosophy after his initial failure (a clear critique of the Soviet Union.) The H.P.L.D. ("Highest Possible Level of Development") civilization outright states that it is impossible to force happiness on a civilization, and that it must struggle through the process of building a society itself.

A select few stories parallel more specific tropes; the tale of O królewiczu Ferrycym i królewnie Krystalii ("Prince Ferrix and the Princess Crystal") apes the typical structure of the medieval love fairytale. The prince goes to seek the love of Princess Crystal (the sexual dimorphism of robotics is never thoroughly explained), but she says she will only marry a "paleface," a term for humans in this apocalyptic future. This is also the only story in which a human is a character; though they are mentioned offhand in others, they are never treated as anything more than a myth. The prince disguises himself as a paleface to try and win her love, but when a true human is brought before her, the incredible ugliness of the human makes it obvious that the prince is only pretending. The Princess forces them to duel to the death, and Prince Ferrix easily crushes the human. However, in the process, Princess Crystal realizes how hideous humans are and falls in love with Ferrix, and the two live happily ever after, in a parody of Chivalric romance. Other parodied tropes include the Sorcerer's Apprentice and the legend of King Midas. By parodying these with Robotics, Lem reevaluates the ethical and moral considerations of these myths.

== Publication history ==
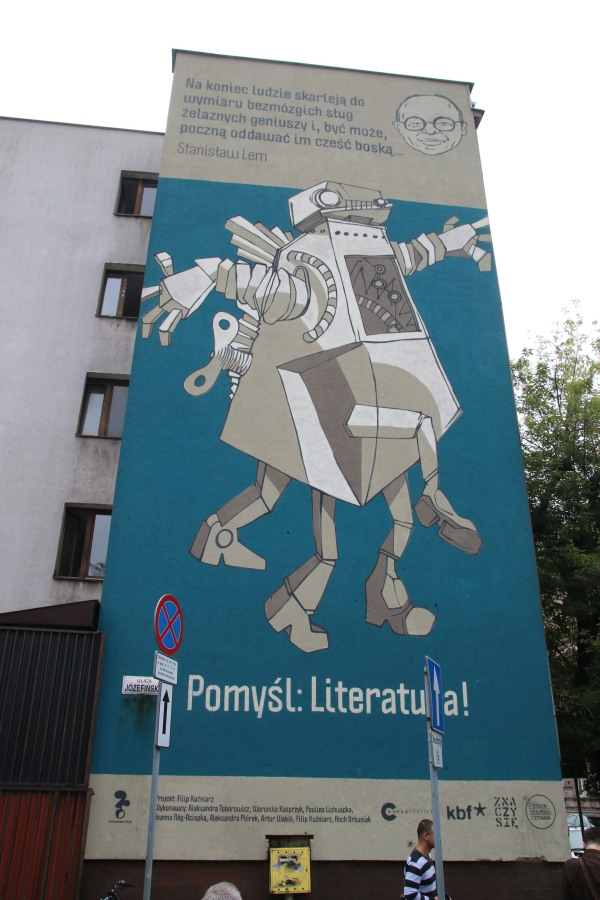
A mural in Kraków, Poland, depicting an unspecified robot imagined by Lem

The whole series was published in the 1965 Polish collection Cyberiada by Wydawnictwo Literackie and also included stories published previously elsewhere.

- Jak ocalał świat (Bajki robotów Wydawnictwo Literackie 1964), translated as How the World was Saved.
- Maszyna Trurla (Bajki robotów Wydawnictwo Literackie 1964), translated as Trurl's Machine.
- Wielkie lanie (Bajki robotów Wydawnictwo Literackie 1964), translated as A Good Schellacking.
- Bajka o trzech maszynach opowiadających króla Genialona (Cyberiada Wydawnictwo Literackie 1965), translated as Tale of the Three Storytelling Machines of King Genius. Essentially it is a matryoshka of stories. In particular, the tale of "Zipperupus, king of the Partheginians, the Deutons, and the Profligoths" contains several titled stories-within-stories presented as dreams from "dreaming cabinets":
  - Alacritus the Knight and Fair Ramolda, Daughter of Heteronius
  - The Marvelous Mattress of Princess Bounce
  - Bliss in the Eightfold Embrace of Octopauline
  - Wockle Weed
  - The Wedding Night of Princess Ineffabelle
- Altruizyna, czyli opowieść prawdziwa o tym, jak pustelnik Dobrycy kosmos uszczęśliwić zapragnął i co z tego wynikło (collection Polowanie Wydawnictwo Literackie 1965), Translated as Altruizine, or A True Account of How Bonhomius the Hermetic Hermit Tried to Bring About Universal Happiness, and What Came of It.
- Kobyszczę (collection Bezsenność Wydawnictwo Literackie 1971)
- Edukacja Cyfrania: (collection Maska Wydawnictwo Literackie 1976)
  - Opowieść pierwszego Odmrożeńca
  - Opowieść drugiego Odmrożeńca
- Powtórka (collection Powtórka Wydawnictwo Literackie 1979)

=== The Seven Sallies of Trurl and Klapaucius ===
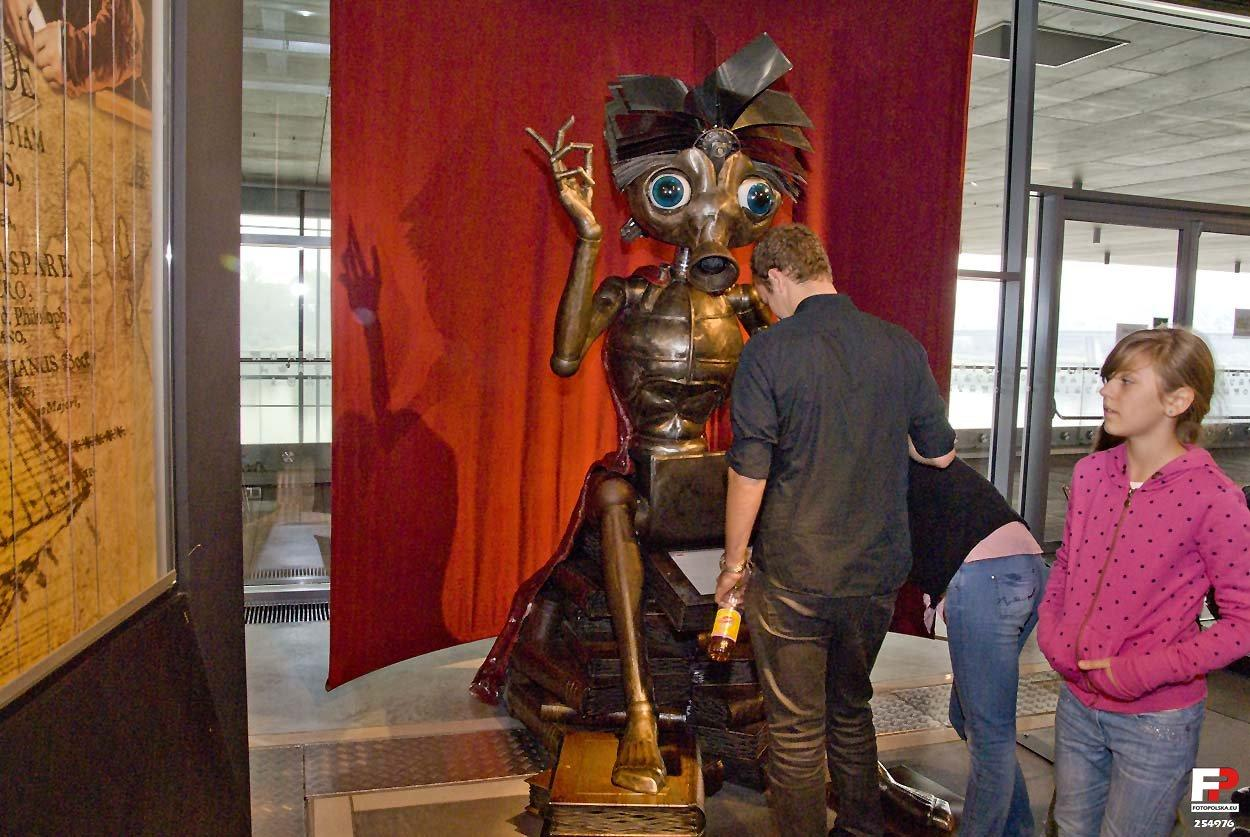
Trurl's Elektrybałt at the Copernicus Science Centre: you type some words, and Elektrybałt makes up a poetic work in the specified genre.

Polish title: Siedem wypraw Trurla i Klapaucjusza. All these stories were first published in the 1965 Polish collection Cyberiada by Wydawnictwo Literackie.

- Wyprawa pierwsza, czyli pułapka Gargancjana (The first sally, or the trap of Gargantius)
- Wyprawa pierwsza A, czyli Elektrybałt Trurla (The first sally (A), or Trurl's electronic bard)
- Wyprawa druga, czyli oferta króla Okrucyusza (The second sally, or the offer of king Krool)
- Wyprawa trzecia, czyli smoki prawdopodobieństwa (The third sally, or the dragons of probability)
- Wyprawa czwarta, czyli o tym jak Trurl kobietron zastosował, królewicza Pantarktyka od mąk miłosnych chcąc zbawić i jak potem do użycia dzieciomiotu doszło (The fourth sally, or how Trurl built a femfatalatron to save prince Pantagoon from the pangs of love, and how later he resorted to a cannonade of babies)
- Wyprawa piąta, czyli o figlach króla Baleryona (The fifth sally, or the mischief of King Balerion)
- Wyprawa piąta A, czyli konsultacja Trurla (The fifth sally (A), or Trurl's prescription)
- Wyprawa szósta, czyli jak Trurl i Klapaucjusz demona drugiego rodzaju stworzyli, aby zbójcę Gębona pokonać (The sixth sally, or how Trurl and Klapaucius created a demon of the second kind to defeat the pirate Pugg)
- Wyprawa siódma, czyli o tym jak własna doskonałość Trurla do złego przywiodła (The Seventh Sally or How Trurl's Own Perfection Led to No Good)

=== Translation ===
In 1974, an English translation by Michael Kandel was published by Harcourt Brace. The translation has been widely regarded as hugely successful, and Kandel was nominated for numerous awards. Since the original book contained heavy wordplay and numerous neologisms, Kandel opted for a method of translation that was more free-form than a typical translation, and took heavy liberties in regards to words, sentence structure, and especially poetry. Though this inventive approach to translation can be controversial, in The Cyberiad it has been widely praised as resulting in an immensely successful final result. It has been held up by numerous scholars as a possible standard for the translations of more complex works. Lem himself heavily praised the book and approach, saying that Kandel was the "best translator his work could ever have".

Modern Polish editions contain five stories which are absent from Kandel's English edition: Kobyszczę, Edukacja Cyfrania, Opowieść pierwszego odmrożeńca, Opowieść drugiego odmrożeńca, and Powtórka. Kobyszczę has appeared in English as “In Hot Pursuit of Happiness,” in the 1973 anthology View from Another Shore edited by Franz Rottensteiner.

== Reception and legacy ==
The Cyberiad has been widely praised and acknowledged for its writing, humor, and allegorical nature. Most critics agree that it is a work of "comic-satirical science fiction", though many have argued that the deeper themes present make it far more than a simple work of science fiction.

The book was met with praise at release, with critics applauding both the original and the renowned translation. Leslie Fiedler called the work "truly amusing and profoundly disturbing at the same time". Though some critics disliked the directness of the fables, it was agreed that it was if nothing else, a sharp and amusing satire of our modern society. Later on, more critical literary analysis also praised the work, drawing attention to its sharp political messages, critique of anthropocentrism, and approach to the psychology of artificial life. It has been considered a classic of Eastern European science fiction and has become widely appreciated in both the Eastern European and broader scientific and technological communities.

The book as a whole, and some stories contained within, have been praised by numerous science fiction writers, most famously Ursula K. Le Guin and Kurt Vonnegut.

An elaborate interactive Google Doodle inspired by the illustrations of Daniel Mróz in The Cyberiad was created and published on November 23, 2011 in his honor for the 60th anniversary of Lem's first published book: The Astronauts. In it, an animated character resembling Lem meets a giant robot.

== Adaptations ==
In 1970, Krzysztof Meyer composed Cyberiada – an opera to his own libretto based on selected stories.

In 1975 an animated film Maszyna Trurla (8 minutes) was released based on Lem's story (director Jerzy Zitzman, screenplay Leszek Mech).

The Seventh Sally or How Trurl's Own Perfection Led to No Good (Polish title: Wyprawa siódma, czyli o tym jak własna doskonałość Trurla do złego przywiodła) was adapted as part of the plot for the film Victim of the Brain, there called The Perfect Imitation. This same story, in which Trurl creates a miniature mechanical kingdom for a tyrant to play with, was also an inspiration of the game SimCity.

In 2026 the book was adapted into a five-part audio series for BBC Radio 4.

== Publications ==
- Lem, Stanisław (1975). The Cyberiad – fables for the cybernetic age. translated by Michael Kandel. United Kingdom: Secker and Warburg. ISBN 0436244209.
- Lem, Stanisław (1985). The Cyberiad. translated by Michael Kandel. United States: Harcourt, Brace & Company. ISBN 0-15-623550-1.
