= Christian Seibert =

German musician and pianist

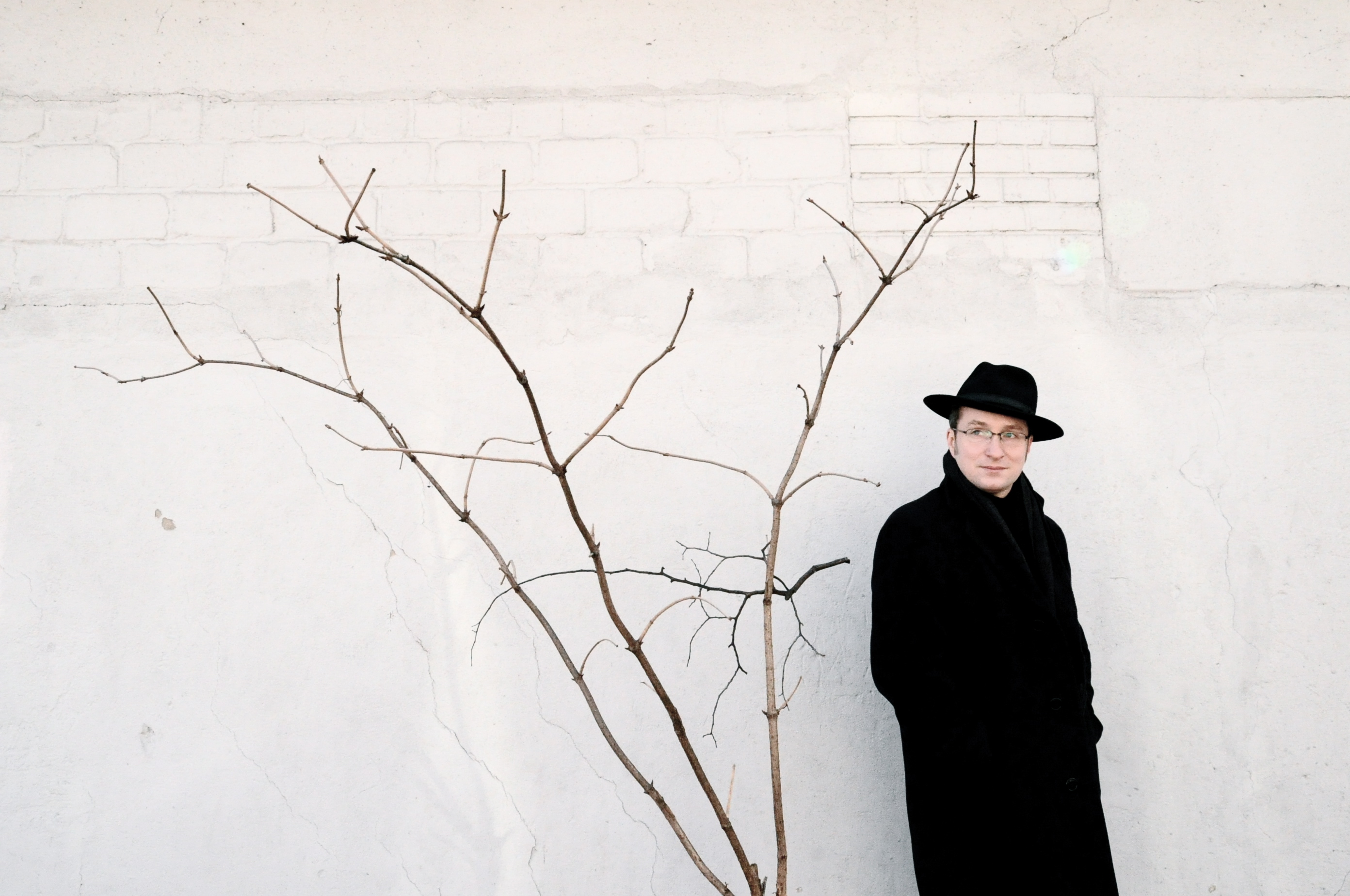
Christian Seibert (Photo: Neda Navaee)

Christian Seibert (born 1975) is a German classical pianist who recorded the complete piano works by composers such as Krzysztof Meyer. He founded the Kleist Music School in Frankfurt (Oder).

== Life and career ==
Seibert was born in Delmenhorst to a family of musicians. His father is the pianist, chamber musician and academic teacher Kurt Seibert. Christian first appeared in public at age 10. From age 16, he studied with Pavel Gililov in Cologne. He continued his studies in Vienna, taking master classes with pianists such as Bruno Leonardo Gelber and Rudolf Kehrer. He achieved prizes at competitions such as the Ferruccio Busoni International Piano Competition and the Robert Schumann International Competition for Pianists and Singers in Zwickau, which led to international concerts.

In March 2013, Seibert founded the Kleist Music School in Frankfurt (Oder). He has been artistic director of the lounge concerts of the Viadrina European University in Frankfurt (Oder).

=== Festivals and concerts ===
Seibert is particularly interested in the music of around 1900. He has performed at festivals such as the Alpenklassik Festival Bad Reichenhall, the Bodenseefestival, the Czech Dvořák Festival, the Echternach Music Festival in Luxembourg, the Festival Internacional de Santander in Spain, and the Klavier-Festival Ruhr. He has given recitals at the Gasteig in Munich, the Salzburg Residenz, the Glocke in Bremen, Wigmore Hall in London, and in Atlanta, New York City and Dubai. He is the initiator and organizer of the 2017 PianOdra piano festival in Frankfurt/Slubice.

=== Recordings ===
Seibert played for broadcasters including the WDR in Cologne. His first recording was dedicated to music by Ernst Toch, taken by the label CPO. His second recording contained music by Paul Hindemith. The complete sonata piano work by Krzysztof Meyer was released by the label EDA in 2011. In 2012, he recorded the complete works for piano and orchestra by Alexander Tansman with the Brandenburgisches Staatsorchester Frankfurt (Oder) conducted by Howard Griffiths. A reviewer noted his precision, sovereignty, sensitivity and his touch well suited to Tansman's colourful tonal language. The piano works by Nino Rota have also been recorded.

- 2004 Ernst Toch: Capriccetti op. 36, Kleinstadtbilder op. 49, Sonata op. 47, Burlesken op. 31, Konzert Etüden op. 55, CPO 999 926 2
- 2007 Paul Hindemith: Klaviersonate Nr. 3, Tanzstücke op. 19, In einer Nacht op. 15, CPO 777 171 2
- 2011 Krzysztof Meyer: Klaviersonaten Nr. 1 6, Aphorismen op. 3, Quasi una fantasia op. 104, EDA 36 (2CD)
- 2012 Alexandre Tansman: Concertino (1913), Konzert für Klavier und Orchester (1931), CPO 777 449 2
