= Eduard Brunner =

Swiss classical clarinetist

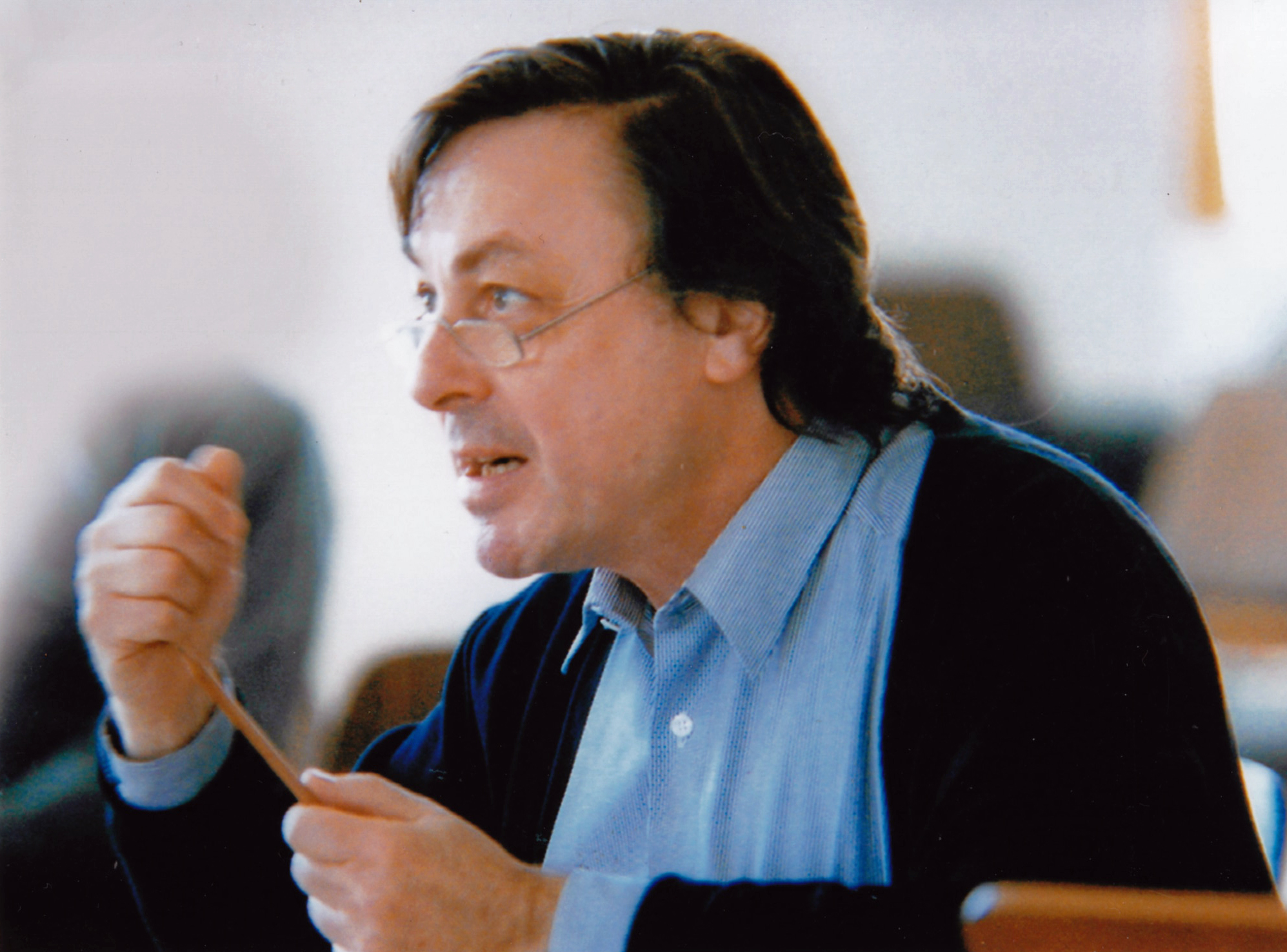
Eduard Brunner

Eduard Brunner (14 July 1939 – 27 April 2017) was a classical clarinetist. He began his musical education in Basel (Switzerland) where he was born, continuing his studies at the Paris Conservatoire with Louis Cahuzac. For thirty years he was the first Clarinet of the Munich's Bavarian Radio Symphony Orchestra and later he was Professor of Clarinet and Chamber Music at the Hochschule für Musik und Darstellende Kunst in Saarbrücken (Germany).

His concert engagements as soloist and in chamber ensembles took him around the world and he frequently participated in Music Festivals at Lockenhaus, Vienna, Moscow, Warsaw, Schleswig-Holstein, Berlin, amongst others. He also undertook numerous Master Classes in different countries and has an extensive discography of over 250 works for Clarinet. He edited and recorded the complete works of Carl Stamitz and Ludwig Spohr for Clarinet.

He was an eminent musician who has had an influence on various artists and played at the premiere of a number of works that have become a part of the Clarinet repertoire, such as works by Helmut Lachenmann, Isang Yun, Edison Denisov, Jean Françaix, Gia Kancheli, Krzysztof Meyer, amongst others.

He died on 27 April 2017 at the age of 77.
