= Victim of the Brain =

1988 film

- Directed by: Piet Hoenderdos
- Written by: Daniel Dennett (story); Stanislaw Lem (story); Terrel Miedaner (story)
- Produced by: Kees Kasander; Denis Wigman
- Cinematography: Frans Bromet
- Edited by: Wim Louwrier
- Music by: Facemusic
- Release date: 1988
- Country: Netherlands
- Language: English

Victim of the Brain is a 1988 film by Dutch director Piet Hoenderdos, loosely based on The Mind's I (1981), a compilation of texts and stories on the philosophy of mind and self, co-edited by Douglas Hofstadter and Daniel C. Dennett. The film weaves interviews with Hofstadter with adaptations of several works in the book: Dennett's Where am I?, The Soul of the Mark III Beast by Terrel Miedaner, and also the short story The Seventh Sally: How Trurl's Own Perfection Led to No Good from The Cyberiad by Stanisław Lem. The film was shown several times on television in the Netherlands in the late 1980s.

== See also ==
- Brain in a vat, the topic of the story Where am I?
- Can a machine have a soul?, ideas related to The Soul of the Mark III Beast
- Matrix reality, a popular term for concepts in the story How Trurl's Own Perfection Led to No Good
