= The Silent Star =

1960 film

The Silent Star / First Spaceship on Venus
- German theatrical release poster
- German: Der schweigende Stern; Polish: Milcząca Gwiazda
- Directed by: Kurt Maetzig
- Screenplay by: Kurt Maetzig; J. Barkhauer (uncredited)
- Story by: J. Fethke; W. Kohlhasse; G. Reisch; G. Rücker; A. Stenbock-Fermor
- Based on: The Astronauts by Stanisław Lem
- Starring: Günther Simon; Julius Ongewe; Yoko Tani
- Cinematography: Joachim Hasler
- Edited by: Lena Neumann
- Music by: Andrzej Markowski
- Production companies: Roter Kreis group of DEFA; Filmowe Iluzjon film studio
- Distributed by: Progress Film (East Germany); Crown International Pictures (US)
- Release dates: 26 February 1960 (East Germany); 7 March 1960 (Poland); 31 October 1962 (United States)
- Running time: 95 minutes (uncut); 79 minutes (English dub)
- Countries: East Germany; Poland
- Language: German
- Box office: 4,375,094 tickets

Der schweigende Stern (literal English translation The Silent Star) is a 1960 East German/Polish color science fiction film based on the 1951 science fiction novel The Astronauts by Polish science fiction writer Stanisław Lem. In Poland, the film was known as Milcząca Gwiazda (which translates as The Silent Star). The film was directed by Kurt Maetzig, and stars Günther Simon, Julius Ongewe, and Yoko Tani. It was first released in February 1960 by Progress Film in East Germany, running 95 min. It was released in the US on 31 October 1962 retitled First Spaceship on Venus on a double bill with the 1958 Japanese film ''Varan the Unbelievable''.

After finding an ancient, long-buried flight recorder that originally came from a spaceship, apparently from Venus, a human spaceship is dispatched to the Morning star. The crew discovers a long-dead Venusian civilization that had constructed a device intended to destroy all life on Earth prior to invasion. Before they could execute their plan, they perished in a global nuclear war.

== Plot ==
In 1985, engineers involved in an industrial project to irrigate the Gobi Desert accidentally unearth a mysterious and apparently artificial "spool". When found to be made of a material unknown on Earth, the spool is circumstantially linked to the Tunguska explosion of 1908. The spool is seized on as evidence that the explosion, originally blamed on a meteor, was actually caused by an alien spaceship.

Professor Harringway deduces the craft must have come from Venus. The spool itself is determined to be a flight recorder and is partially decoded by an international team of scientists led by Professor Sikarna and Dr. Tschen Yü. When radio greetings sent to Venus go unanswered, Harringway announces that a journey to Venus is the only alternative. The recently completed Soviet spaceship Kosmoskrator, intended to voyage to Mars, is now redirected to Venus, a 30-to-31-day journey. During the voyage, Sikarna works diligently to translate the alien message using the spaceship's computer.

When their spaceship nears Venus, radio interference from the planet cuts the crew off from Earth. By then, Sikarna's efforts lead to a stunning discovery: The spool describes a Venusian plan to irradiate the Earth's surface, with the extermination of mankind being the prelude to their invasion. Rather than containing a "cosmic document", as had been expected, the spool bears a cold-blooded message of destruction. With this new information the crew decides to transmit this information to Earth, believing that the information would be of service to mankind. Harringway, however, convinces the crew to press on towards Venus rather than return to Earth with revelations that could panic mankind, leading to unknown consequences.

With the ship's robot, Omega, German astronaut Brinkman pilots a one-man landing craft through the Venusian atmosphere. On the surface, he comes upon an industrial complex and finds small information storage devices that look like insects. Brinkmann's landing craft is destroyed in an explosion when it accidentally lands on high-tension power lines. The rest of the crew lands Kosmoskrator to investigate the explosion. The crew splits up, some staying near Kosmoskrator to study the storage devices. The others follow the power line to try and find the Venusians, but they find no life forms. Instead, they discover a large golf ball-like structure that Arsenjew suggests may be a giant transformer or a force-field generator. Following the power lines in the other direction, they find the remains of a deserted and blasted city centered around a huge crater. There are clear signs of a catastrophic explosion so intense that the shadowy forms of the humanoid Venusians are permanently burned onto the walls of the surviving structures.

The Venusians are gone, but their machines remain functioning, including the radiation-bombardment machine intended for use against the Earth. One of the scientists accidentally triggers the weapon, leading to a frantic effort by the team to disarm it. Tschen Yü lowers Talua, the ship's communication officer, into the Venusian command center. When Tschen Yü's spacesuit is punctured, Brinkmann ventures out to save him. Before he can reach Yü, Talua succeeds in reversing the weapon. Unfortunately, this also reverses Venus' gravitational field, flinging Kosmoskrator out into space. Brinkmann is also repelled off-planet, beyond the reach of the spaceship to save him, while Talua and Tschen Yü remain marooned on the devastated Venus. The surviving crew members must return to Earth, where they warn humanity about the dangers of atomic weapons.

== Cast ==
- Günther Simon as Raimund Brinkmann (Robert Brinkman in the US release), the Kosmokrator's German pilot
- Julius Ongewe as Talua, the African communications officer
- Yoko Tani as Dr. Sumiko Ogimura, the Japanese medical officer
- Oldřich Lukeš as Professor Hawling, a US nuclear physicist (Orloff in the US release)
- Ignacy Machowski as Professor Sołtyk (Durand, a French engineer, in the US release), the Polish chief engineer
- Mikhail Postnikov as Professor Arsenjew, Soviet astrophysicist and commander of the mission (Harringway in the US release)
- Kurt Rackelmann as Professor Sikarna, an Indian mathematician
- Tang Hua-Ta as Dr. Tschen Yü (Chen Yu in the US release), a Chinese linguist.
- Lucyna Winnicka as Joan Moran, television reporter
- Eduard von Winterstein as a nuclear physicist
- Ruth Maria Kubitschek as Professor Arsenjew's wife
- Eva-Maria Hagen as a journalist

Julius Ongewe was a medical student in Leipzig from Nigeria or Kenya. He was the first black actor to be portrayed travelling in space.

Despite a diverse cast, gender and racial attitudes are not much different than in American science fiction films of that era, with Ogimura being framed as delicate because she is a woman and in the caretaking position of ship nurse, while Talua fills a "service-oriented" crew position (which is opposite to central role of Black pilot Robert Smith in the novel).

== Production ==
The story is based on the 1951 science fiction novel The Astronauts by Stanisław Lem. Lem was approached by Kurt Maetzig from DEFA with an idea to make a film adaptation of Lem's novel, possibly because Lem was widely known in Poland and abroad at the time. The Astronauts was likely chosen due to the recent advancements in rocket technology and the popularity of space travel in science fiction. The story also expressed many socialist ideals, appropriate for the state-owned studio.

The DEFA director Herbert Volkmann, responsible for finance, as well as other officials of the GDR, were strict with the project: they had ideological concerns about the script, and new writers were brought in to work on it. Eventually, twelve different versions of the script were created.

In the film's original East German and Polish release, the Earth spaceship sent to Venus is named Kosmokrator.

The film was shot mostly in East Germany. The outdoors scenes were shot in the area of Zakopane, Poland and the airfield of Berlin-Johannisthal and special effects in Babelsberg Studio and in a studio in Wrocław, Poland. The spaceship mock-up at the airfield became the subject of a hoax in the newspaper Der Kurier: the front page presented the spaceship as a failed attempt at spaceflight in the Soviet occupation zone.

The film was noted for early extensive usage of "electronic sounds" on its soundtrack. Electronic music and noises illustrated the work of the computer that deciphers the alien message, the message itself, and the eerie landscape of Venus devastated by the nuclear catastrophe. Markowski, who produced the musical score, was assisted by sound engineer Krzysztof Szlifirski from the Experimental Studio of Polish Radio, with some sound effects added at the laboratory of the Military Academy of Technology in Warsaw and with post-production at DEFA.

Ernst Kunstmann was in charge of special effects.

== Release ==
It was the first science fiction film released by Poland and East Germany. When first released to European cinemas, the film sold about 4.3 million tickets, making it one of the 30 most successful DEFA films.

In 1962, the shortened, 79-minute English-dubbed release from Crown International Pictures changed the title to First Spaceship on Venus for the English-speaking market. The film was released theatrically in the U.S. on 31 October 1962. During its theatrical run, it played as a double feature with the re-edited, Americanized version of the 1958 Japanese Kaiju film Varan the Unbelievable.

=== Critical response ===
In a retrospective on Soviet science fiction film, British director Alex Cox compared The Silent Star to the Japanese film The Mysterians, but called the former "more complex and morally ambiguous". Cox also remarked that Silent Star's images of melted cities and crystallised forests, overhung by swirling clouds of gas, are masterpieces of production design. The scene in which three cosmonauts are menaced halfway up a miniature Tower of Babel by an encroaching sea of sludge may not entirely convince, but it is still a heck of a thing to see".

Stanislaw Lem, whose novel the film was based upon, was extremely critical of the adaptation and even wanted his name removed from the credits in protest against the extra politicization of the storyline when compared to his original. (Lem: "It practically delivered speeches about the struggle for peace. Trashy screenplay was painted; tar was bubbling, which would not scare even a child".)

=== Awards ===
- 1964: Festival of Utopian Films, Triest (Utopisches Filmfestival Triest): "Golden Spaceship Award" ("Das goldene Raumschiff")

== Other releases ==
=== United States ===
In 1962 the shortened 79-minute dubbed release from Crown International Pictures adopted the title First Spaceship on Venus for the English-speaking market. The film was released theatrically in the U.S. as a double feature with the re-edited version of the 1958 Japanese Kaiju film Varan the Unbelievable. All references to the atomic bombing of Hiroshima were edited out. The American character Hawling became a Russian named Orloff. The Russian character Arsenjew became the American Herringway, while the Polish character Soltyk became the Frenchman Durand. The spacecraft used for the journey was referred to and spelled as Cosmostrator.

Two differently cut and dubbed versions of the film were also shown on the American market at the time, Spaceship Venus Does Not Reply and Planet of the Dead.

The original, uncut version of the film (at 95 minutes) was finally released in the U.S. in 2004 under its original title The Silent Star by the DEFA Film Library of the University of Massachusetts Amherst. In 2007, the film was shown on the horror hosted television series Cinema Insomnia. Apprehensive Films later released the Cinema Insomnia episode on DVD.

=== Mystery Science Theater 3000 ===
Under the name First Spaceship on Venus, the movie was featured in episode #211 of Mystery Science Theater 3000, first airing on Comedy Central on 29 December 1990. Series writer Mary Jo Pehl marveled at the ethnically and gender-diverse cast, although she admitted that didn't make her care about the fate of the characters. Writer / performer Kevin Murphy said the episode's subpar host segments were a result of the cast and crew going on vacation after the episode was completed.

Writer Jim Vorel ranked the episode as one of the series' worst, ranking it #172 out of 197 MST3K episodes from the first twelve seasons. Still, Vorel writes the episode isn't "terrible"; it "simply fl[ies] under the radar." First Spaceship on Venus, in Vorel's opinion, is "a rather dry (but pleasantly colorful and silly-looking) sci-fi story," with "painfully dorky looking costumes" in a "cheap, spacefaring sci-fi picture."

Shout! Factory released the episode on 18 November 2008, as part of the MST3K: 20th Anniversary Edition DVD set. The set also included three other episodes: Future War (episode #1004), Laserblast (episode (#706), and Werewolf (episode #904).
