= Faithful Robot =

First publication

Faithful Robot (Polish: Wierny robot) is a 1961 comedy/mystery/drama science fiction TV play by Polish writer Stanisław Lem. Its first print was in 1963, in the short story collection Noc księżycowa.

In this story turns a common science fiction trope upside down: rather than a human creates a perfect robot, a robot creates a perfect human. At the same time it is a story of a robot which breaks away from human control.

== Plot ==
The story is set in year of 2000. A detective writer Tom Clempner receives a humanoid robot, named Graumer, in mail. The sender claims they sent nothing, but eventually Graumer convinces Clempner to use the servant he got for free. Graumer becomes increasingly annoying in his efforts to serve the master.

At a party a police inspector tells a story of a runaway robot obsessed with the idea to create a perfect human. The robot skips from owner to owner by boxing and shipping himself, and the police inspector is in pursuit of the robot... Later the story reveals that Graumer created a copy of Clempner and was about to poison the original, but when Clempner did not give away Graumer to the police inspector, the robot changes his mind. One day during a lunch Clempner sees another person and after a while notices the stranger wears his clothes. In the following quarrel the stranger claims that in fact he owns the robot, the house and all... Eventually Graumer poisons both of them and ships himself further.

== Other renditions ==
- Soviet Union: Верный робот, 1965, a TV play
- Czechoslovakia: Věrný robot, 1967
- German Democratic Republic: Der Getreue Roboter, 1977
  - 1980, a version for children
  - Audiobook CD, 2003, ISBN 3-89813-231-5
