= Krzysztof Meyer =

Polish composer (born 1943)

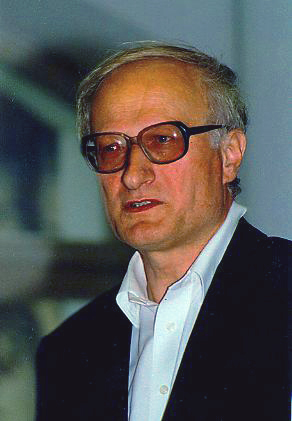
- Krzysztof Meyer, September 2002
- Born: 11 August 1943 (age 83); Kraków, Poland
- Occupations: Composer, pianist, music scholar
- Years active: 1964–present

Krzysztof Meyer (born 11 August 1943) is a Polish composer, pianist, and music scholar, formerly dean of the Department of Music Theory (1972–1975) at the State College of Music (now Academy of Music in Kraków), and president of the Polish Composers' Union (1985–1989). Meyer was professor of composition at the Hochschule für Musik in Cologne from 1987 to 2008, before his retirement.

== Biography ==
Meyer was born in Kraków, Poland. As a boy he played piano and organ, and he began his composition study early – in 1954, with Stanisław Wiechowicz. Then, at the State College of Music in Kraków, he continued studying with Wiechowicz, and after the latter's death in 1963, did his diploma with Krzysztof Penderecki (1965). He also studied music theory (diploma in 1966). In Paris, he took courses with Nadia Boulanger (1964, 1966 and 1968) and, in Warsaw, he became a private pupil of Witold Lutosławski.

His Symphony No. 1 was his first work to be performed, in Kraków in 1964. In 1965, while still a student, he made his debut at the "Warsaw Autumn", as the youngest composer in the festival's history (String Quartet No. 1). He was fascinated with the avant-garde, not only as a composer: from 1965 to 1967, as a member of MW2 Ensemble, he performed experimental pieces, typical for the 1960s, in Poland and in some West European countries. Later, he continued to be active as a pianist, performing mostly his own works, or playing chamber music.

From 1966 to 1987, Meyer taught theory at the State College of Music (now Academy of Music in Kraków), holding the chairmanship of the Department of Music Theory from 1972 to 1975. From 1987 to 2008, he was professor of composition at the Hochschule für Musik in Cologne.

From 1985 and 1989, he was the president of the Union of Polish Composers. For 14 years (1974–1988), he took part in the work of the Repertory Committee of the "Warsaw Autumn" International Festival of Contemporary Music. He is a Fellow of Collegium Invisibile.

String Quartet No. 6 (1/3)
Music sample from work of Krzysztof Meyer

== Music ==
In his early compositions (String Quartets Nos. 1–4, Symphonies Nos. 1–3), Meyer experimented with unconventional sonorities, typical of the Polish avant-garde music in the 1960s. He used twelve-tone technique, albeit freely, as well as aleatoric technique and collage. All of these appear in his first opera, Cyberiada, to a science-fiction libretto after Stanisław Lem's The Cyberiad.

In later works, Meyer gradually limited the multitude of sonic ideas. He increasingly focussed on the drama and expression as understood in a traditional way although avoiding romantic effects. The style of Meyer's later works reflects his interest in tradition; even his use of titles such as "string quartet", "sonata", "concerto", "symphony" are indicators of the traditional trend in his aesthetic. "There are contemporary textures and timbres, but they are usually incidental to a language in which tonal pulls and familiar signposts govern the overall flow and structure."

Chamber music occupies a privileged place in his output. "What is attractive to him in such pieces is the fact that they are perfect to create 'sonic puzzles', referring to the 'hidden arithmetic exercise of the soul, which does not know that it is counting', as Leibnitz described the essence of music. Examples of these are the variation of the tempi in String Quartet No. 11 or the changes of rhythm in String Quartet No. 10. Some pieces for large ensembles can be listened to as a musical commentary to a political event or existential reflection. These topics are hinted at by the subtitles and quotations ('Polish' Symphony No. 6, referring to the atmosphere of martial law in Poland from 1981 to 1983) or the use of the text (Symphony No. 8, with the lyrics of the anti-antisemitic poems by Adam Zagajewski). The catastrophic message of the oratorio The Creation of the World is told through the text but its expression is achieved through the music."

== Selected awards ==
- First Prize for Symphony No. 3 (1968) at the Grzegorz Fitelberg Composers' Competition
- Prix de Composition Musicale of the Prince Pierre de Monaco Foundation for opera Cyberiada (1970)
- Special Mention at Tribune Internationale des Compositeurs UNESCO in Paris for String Quartet No. 2 (1970) and String Quartet No. 3 (1976)
- First Prize at the Karol Szymanowski Competition in Warsaw for Symphony No. 4
- Herder Prize (Vienna, 1984)
- Award of the Union of Polish Composers (1992)
- Jurzykowski Prize (New York, 1993)
- Johann-Stamitz-Preis (Mannheim, 1996)
- Kraków Book of the Month Award for the book Mistrzowie i przyjaciele (May 2012)

== Selected works ==
=== Stage works ===
- Cyberiada. Fantastic Comic Opera, Op. 15 (1970). Libretto by the composer, based upon Stanisław Lem's series of short stories, The Cyberiad.
- The Countess [Hrabina]. Ballet on the motives from Stanisław Moniuszko's opera, Op. 49 (1980)
- The Gamblers [Igroki]. A Completed Version of Dmitri Shostakovich's opera after N. Gogol, Op. 53 (1981) (soloists of the "Bolshoi" in Moscow, Nordwestdeutsche Philharmonie, Michail Jurowski, Capriccio 60 062-2)
- The Maple Brothers [Klonowi bracia]. Children Opera, Op. 72 (1989). Libretto by the composer after E. Szwartz

=== Works for orchestra ===
- 9 symphonies:

No. 1, Op. 10 (1964)
No. 2 Epitaphium Stanisław Wiechowicz in memoriam for choir and orchestra, Op. 14 (1967)
No. 3 Symphonie d'Orphée for choir and orchestra, Op. 20 (1968)
No. 4, Op. 31 (1973)
No. 5, Op. 44 (1979)
No. 6 "Polish" Symphony, Op. 57 (1982) (Polish Radio Symphony Orchestra, A. Wit, ISPV 179 CD)
No. 7 Sinfonia del tempo che passa, Op. 97 (2002–2003) (NOSPR, G. Chmura; DUX 0695)
No. 8 Sinfonia da requiem, Op. 111 (2009)
No. 9 Fidae speique Sinfonia, Op. 126 (2016)

- Fireballs, Op. 37 (1976) (Silesian Philharmonic, Karol Stryja, Polish Information Center 007)
- Symphony in D major in Mozartean style, Op. 41 (1976)
- Hommage à Johannes Brahms, Op. 59 (1982) (Kölner-Rundfunk-Sinfonie-Orchester, A. Wit, KOCH 3-5037-2)
- Musica incrostata, Op. 70 (1988) (WOSPRiT, A. Wit, Koch Schwann 3-1573-2)
- Farewell Music, Op. 88 (1997)

=== Works for solo instrument(s) and orchestra ===
- 2 Flute concertos

No. 1, Op. 6 (1964)
No. 2, Op. 61 (1983)

- 2 Violin concertos

No. 1, Op. 12 (1965) (R. Lasocki, WOSPRiT, K. Stryja, Olympia OCD 323)
No. 2, Op. 87 (1996) (M. Rezler, NOSPR, G. Chmura, DUX 0594)

- 2 Cello concertos

No. 1, Op. 28 (1972)(withdrawn)
No. 2, Op. 85 (1995)(B. Pergamenschikov, NOSPR, A. Wit, DUX 0594)

- Concerto da camera for oboe, percussion and strings, Op. 29 (1972)
- Concerto for trumpet and orchestra, Op. 35 (1973)
- Concerto for piano, Op. 46 (1989) (Pavel Gililov, WOSPRiT, Antoni Wit, Koch Schwann 3-1573-2)
- Canti Amadei per violoncello ed orchestra, Op. 63 (1984) (I. Monighetti, Capella Cracoviensis, S. Gałoński, ISPV 179 CD)
- Concerto da camera for harp, cello and string orchestra, Op. 64 (1984) (B. Trendowicz, K. Jaroszewska, Chamber Orchestra Amadeus, A. Duczmal; PR CD 085-2)
- Caro Luigi per 4 violoncelli ed orchestra d'archi, Op. 73 (1989)
- Concerto for alto saxophone and string orchestra, Op. 79 (1992) (John-Edward Kelly NEOS )
- Concerto for clarinet and orchestra, Op. 96 (2001) (E. Brunner, NOSPR, G. Chmura, DUX 0594)
- Double concerto for violin, violoncello and orchestra, Op. 105 (2006) (M. Rezler, Julius Berger, Ł. Borowicz, NOSPR; DUX 0695)
- Concerto for (acoustic) guitar, timpani and string orchestra, Op. 115 (2011)

=== Vocal works ===
- Symphony No. 2 Epitaphium Stanisław Wiechowicz in memoriam for choir and orchestra, Op. 14 (1967)
- Symphony No. 3 Symphonie d'Orphée for choir and orchestra, Op. 20 (1968)
- Lyric Triptych for tenor and chamber orchestra, Op. 38 (1976)
- Mass for mixed choir and orchestra, Op. 68 (1996) (The National Orchestra and Choir in Warsaw, Antoni Wit, ACD 096-2)
- Velichalnaya for mixed choir, Op. 71 (1988) (Polish Nightingales, Wojciech A. Krolopp, Azymuth AZ AZ CD 11.045)
- Creation (Schöpfung), oratorio for soli, choir and orchestra, Op. 91 (1999)
- Symphony No. 8 Sinfonia da requiem for choir and orchestra, Op. 111 (2009)

=== Chamber music ===
==== For two instruments ====
Violin and piano:

- Misterioso for violin and piano, Op. 83 (1994) (A. Breuninger, I. Berger; Ars Musici AM 1204-02)
- Capriccio interrotto for violin and piano, Op. 93 (2000) (A. Bayeva, G. Karyeva, PR CD 194; – R. Simovic, Z. Darhomorska, PR CD 191)

Cello and piano:

- Canzona per violoncello e pianoforte, Op. 56 (1981) (D. Geringas, T. Schatz, ISPV 192 CD; – E. Mizerska, E. Abbate, TOCC 0098)
- Two sonatas for cello and piano

Sonata per violoncello e pianoforte No.1, Op. 62 (1983) (- R. Korupp, K. Meyer, Ambitus 97848; – E. Mizerska, E. Abbate, TOCC 0098)
Sonata per violoncello e pianoforte No.2, Op. 99 (2004) (E. Mizerska, K. Glensk, TOCC 0098)

Other combinations:

- Impromptu multicolore for two pianos, Op. 92 (2000) (A. Soós, I. Haag, MGB CTS-M 107)
- Duetti concertanti for bassoon and piano, Op. 101 (2004) (K. & Etsuko Okazaki, ISPV 194 CD)
- Metamorphoses for saxophone and piano, Op. 102 (2004) (J.-E. Kelly, B. Versteegh, ISPV 194)

==== For three instruments ====
- Hommage à Nadia Boulanger for flute, viola and harp, Op. 17 (1971) (rec. E. Gajewska, R. Duź, H. Storck, ISPV 189 CD)
- Piano Trio, Op. 50 (1980) (Trio Wawelskie, ISPV 176 CD; – Arcadia Trio, Bella Musica 31.2415; – Altenberg Trio, Challenge classic 72310)
- Trio for flute, viola and guitar, Op. 78 (1992) (R. Aitken, E. Schloifer, R. Evers; ISPV 176 CD)
- String Trio, Op. 81 (1993) (Deutsches Streichtrio; ISPV 176 CD; – T. Gadzina, R. Duź, M. Wasiółka; Acte Préalable AP0146)
- Trio for clarinet, violin and piano, Op. 90 (1998) (E. Brunner, I. Monighetti, P. Gililov; ISPV 189 CD)
- Trio for oboe, bassoon and piano, Op. 98 (2002) (Tomohara Yosiba, Koji and Etsuko Okazaki, ISPV 194)

==== For four instruments ====
- 15 String Quartets

No. 1, Op. 8 (1963)
No. 2, Op. 23 (1969)
No. 3, Op. 27 (1971)
No. 4, Op. 33 (1974)
No. 5, Op. 42 (1977)
No. 6, Op. 51 (1981)
No. 7, Op. 65 (1985)
No. 8, Op. 67 (1985)
No. 9, Op. 74 (1990)
No. 10, Op. 82 (1994)
No. 11, Op. 95 (2001)
No. 12, Op. 103 (2005)
No. 13, Op. 113 (2010)
No. 14, Op. 122 (2014)
No. 15, Op. 131 (2017)

- Quattro colori for clarinet, trombone, 'cello and piano, Op. 24 (1970)
- Concerto retro for flute, violin, violoncello and harpsichord, Op. 39 (1976) (E. Gajewska, T. Gadzina, M. Wasiółka, K. Meyer, Acte Préalable AP0076)
- Piano Quartet, Op. 112 (2009)

==== For five or more instruments ====
- Clarinet Quintet, Op. 66 (1986) (E. Brunner, Wilanow String Quartet, ISPV 147 CD; – P. Drobnik, Kwartet Wieniawski; Dux 0507/0508)
- Capriccio per sei strumenti, Op. 69 (1988) (E. Gajewska, T. Gadzina, R. Duź, M. Wasiółka, ISPV 189 CD)
- Piano Quintet, Op. 76 (1991) (Wilanow String Quartet & K. Meyer; ISPV 171 CD; – Wieniawski Quartet & Andrzej Tatarski; Dux 0507/0508)
- Cinque colori for flute, violin, violoncello, percussion and piano, Op. 94 (2001)

=== Instrumental music ===
==== For piano solo ====
- 6 Sonatas for Piano (Complete Piano Works - Christian Seibert, EDA 36)

No. 1, Op. 5 (1962) (K. Meyer, Acte Préalable AP0076)
No. 2, Op. 7 (1963) (B. Otto, Sächsische Tonträger LC 9930)
No. 3, Op. 13 (1966)
No. 4, Op. 22 (1968)
No. 5 Sonata de sons rayonnants, Op. 32 (1975/1997)
No. 6 Sonate breve, Op. 106 (2006)

- 24 Preludes for piano, Op. 43 (1978) (K. Meyer, ISPV CD 174; – P. Kubica, SMS RP 12691 CD )
- Quasi una Fantasia for piano, Op. 104 (2005)
- 6 intermezzi for piano, Op. 121 (2013)

==== For other keyboards ====
- Sonata for harpsichord, Op. 30 (1973) (E. Chojnacka, ERATO Japan CD 056044
- Fantasy for organ, Op. 75 (1990) (S. Palm; KR 10068)

==== For violin solo ====
- 2 Violin sonatas

No. 1, Op. 36 (1975) (W. Marschner, ISPC 192 CD)
No. 2, Op. 113 (2018)

Other works:

- 6 Preludes for violin solo (1981) [no opus number]

==== For cello solo ====
- Two Sonatas for Cello

No. 1, Op. 1 (1961) (R. Korupp, CD Ambitus 97484)
No. 2, Op. 109 (2007)

- Moment musical (1976) [no opus number]
- Monologue (1990) (D. Geringas; ConBrioDisc ConBES 2019) [no opus number]

==== For flute solo ====
- Sonata per flauti soli, Op. 52 (1980) (E. Gajewska, Acte Préalable AP0076; – B.-G. Schmitt, ISPV 194 CD)

== Essays and professional writings ==
- Krzysztof Meyer, Schostakowitsch – Sein Leben, sein Werk, seine Zeit, Bergisch Gladbach 1995; also: Paris 1994, Amsterdam 1996, Madrid 1997, St Petersburg 1998, Warsaw 1999, Moscow 2006, Mainz 2008. [Orig. in Polish 1973.]
- Krzysztof Meyer, Witold Lutosławski (with Danuta Gwizdalanka), Cracow 2003 (vol. 1), 2004 (vol. 2)
- Krzysztof Meyer, Dmitri Schostakowitch. Erfahrungen, Leipzig 1983
- Krzysztof Meyer, Prokofjew und Schostakowitsch, in: Bericht über das internationale Symposion "Sergej Prokofjew – Aspekte seines Werkes und der Biographie", Regensburg 1993, pp. 111–133
- Krzysztof Meyer, Analyse musikalischer Form in psychologischer Hinsicht, in: Musikpädagogik als Aufgabe, Kassel 2003
- and numerous articles published in Poland and abroad.

== Literature ==
- B. M. Maciejewski: 12 Polish Composers. Allegro Press. London, 1976, p. 202-206.
- L. Rappoport-Gelfand: Musical Life in Poland. The Postwar Years 1945-1977. Gordon & Breach, New York etc. 1991, p. 133-141. ISBN 2-88124-319-3
