= Microworlds: Writings on Science Fiction and Fantasy =

1984 essay collection by Stanisław Lem

- First edition cover
- Author: Stanisław Lem
- Translator: Franz Rottensteiner, Werner Koopmann, Robert Abernathy
- Language: Polish
- Publisher: Harcourt Brace & Company
- Publication date: 1984
- Publication place: United States
- Pages: 312
- ISBN: 9780151594801

Microworlds: Writings on Science Fiction and Fantasy is a 1984 book by Polish author Stanisław Lem, a collection of his essays on the genres of science fiction and fantasy in general, as well as about specific authors and their works. It is edited by Franz Rottensteiner and published in the United States by Harcourt Brace & Company. The book is a selection of previously published translations of Lem's essays.

Rottensteiner writes that it is "a useful introduction to Lem's nonfiction and his ideas on science fiction and fantasy" and that it should help readers to understand Lem's fiction better.

== Contents ==
- Reflections on my life
- On the structural analysis of science fiction
- Science fiction : a hopeless case – with exceptions ("a more polemic version" of a chapter from Science Fiction and Futurology)
- Philip K. Dick : a visionary among the charlatans (an afterword to the 1975 Polish translation of Ubik)
- The time-travel story and related matters of science-fiction structuring
- Metafantasia : the possibilities of science fiction (from Science Fiction and Futurology)
- Cosmology and science fiction
- Todorov's fantastic theory of literature
- Unitas oppositorum : the prose of Jorge Luis Borges (there was no Polish version, first published in German)
- About the Strugatsky's Roadside Picnic (an afterword to the 1977 Polish translation of Roadside Picnic)
