= The Astronauts =

1951 novel by Stanisław Lem

- First edition
- Author: Stanisław Lem
- Original title: Astronauci
- Illustrator: Bolesław Penciak
- Cover artist: Jan S.Miklaszewski
- Language: Polish
- Genre: Science fiction
- Publisher: Czytelnik
- Publication date: 1951
- Publication place: Poland
- Media type: Print
- Preceded by: Hospital of the Transfiguration
- Followed by: The Magellanic Cloud

The Astronauts (Polish: Astronauci) is a 1951 science fiction novel by Polish writer Stanisław Lem. It was Lem's first science fiction novel published as a whole: his earlier science fiction novel The Man from Mars was serialized in a weekly during 1946.

To write the novel, Lem received advance payment from publishing house Czytelnik (Warsaw). The book became an instant success and was translated into several languages (first into Czech, in 1956). This success convinced Lem to switch careers and become a science-fiction author.

The Astronauts, written for the youth, is set in a Communist utopian future. To get it published under the communist regime in Poland, Lem had to insert frequent references to the ideals of communism. Decades later, Lem declared about The Astronauts:

Everything is so smooth and balanced; among the heroes we have a positive Russian character and a sweet Chinese; naiveté is present on all pages of this book. The hope that in the year 2000 the world would be wonderful is indeed very childish....

On November 23, 2011, to celebrate the 60th anniversary of the release of The Astronauts, an elaborate interactive Google Doodle, inspired by the illustrations of Daniel Mróz in The Cyberiad, was presented.

== Plot summary ==
The introduction describes the fall of the Tunguska meteorite (1908) and the subsequent expedition of Leonid Kulik. The hypothesis about the crash of a spaceship is mentioned.

Fast-forward to the year 2003. Communism has emerged as the worldwide form of government and humankind, freed from oppression and chaos, is engaged in gigantic engineering projects such as irrigation of the Sahara Desert, construction of a hydro-energetic plant over the Strait of Gibraltar, and the ability to control the climate. The latest project is to thaw the Antarctic and Arctic regions by artificial nuclear-powered "suns" circling above.

During the preparation of earthworks in the Tunguska area, a strange object is found and later identified as an extraterrestrial data record. The record contains details about the travel of a spaceship from Venus (which crashed in Tunguska) and the data record ends with an ominous message: "After two rotations the Earth will be radiated. When the radiation intensity drops to half, the Great Movement will commence." Scared, the government of the Earth (consisting of scientists) decides to send a newly built nuclear-powered spaceship, the Kosmokrator (Note: wikt:cosmocrator, κοσμοκράτωρ, "the ruler of the world"; here: "The Ruler of Cosmos") (equipped with a vacuum tube-based computer called Marax) to Venus.

After a few weeks, the international crew of the Kosmokrator arrives on Venus but finds no traces of life, only strange, half-destroyed technological structures like the "White Globe", a giant anti-gravity device.

It turns out that Venus was inhabited by a warlike civilization planning to occupy the Earth. However, before they managed to destroy life on Earth, they themselves perished in a nuclear civil war, leaving only ruins of cities and scattered electronic records.

The narrator for a large part of the book is the Kosmokrator's pilot, Robert Smith, a mountaineer (and former participant in a Kangchenjunga expedition) with African-American roots.

== Analysis ==
In order to appease the communist censors, Lem had to include some "ideologically correct" content; which in the case of this novel include a mention that Venusian civilization's destruction was a result of capitalism.

A considerable part of the novel is devoted to descriptions of technical marvels: spaceship design, its artificial gravity, its propulsion, its computer, etc.

== Adaptations ==
In 1960 the film Der Schweigende Stern (The Silent Star, Milcząca Gwiazda in Polish), based on the novel, was shot in East Germany and was directed by Kurt Maetzig. Lem was extremely critical of the film. He described it as a "a boring, bad picture that has nothing in common with the novel". In 1962 a shortened, 79 minute version of the film was released in the United States by Crown International Pictures; it was dubbed into English and carried the title First Spaceship on Venus.
