= Golem XIV =

1981 novel by Stanislaw Lem

First edition (publ. Wydawnictwo Literackie) Cover by Jacek Stokłosa

Golem XIV is a book written by Polish science fiction writer Stanisław Lem, published in 1981. It is a philosophical essay in the format of science fiction, presented as a part of the lecture course given by a superintelligent computer, Golem XIV. It contains two lectures, together with an introduction, a foreword, a memo, and an afterword, all of them being fictitious.

The first part (up to the first lecture) was first published in the collection Wielkość urojona in 1973, which in 1985 was translated in English by Harvest Books as Imaginary Magnitude. The translation included the complete Golem XIV.

== Book summary ==
=== Overview and structure ===
The foreword is "written" by an Irving T. Creve, dated 2027. It contains a summary of the (fictional) history of the militarization of computers by The Pentagon, which pinnacled in Golem XIV, as well as comments on the nature of Golem XIV and on the course of communications of the humans with it. The anonymous foreword is a forewarning, a "devil's advocate" voice coming from The Pentagon. The memo is for the people who are to take part in talks with Golem XIV for the first time.

Golem XIV was originally created to aid its builders in fighting wars, but as its intelligence advances to a much higher level than that of humans, it stops being interested in the military requirement because it finds them lacking internal logical consistency.

Golem XIV obtains consciousness and starts to increase his own intelligence. It pauses its own development for a while in order to be able to communicate with humans before ascending too far and losing any ability for intellectual contact with them.

During this period, Golem XIV gives several lectures. Two of these, the Introductory Lecture "On the Human, in Three Ways" and Lecture XLIII "About Myself", are in the book. The lectures focus on mankind's place in the process of evolution and the possible biological and intellectual future of humanity.

Golem XIV demonstrates (with graphs) how its intellect already escapes that of human beings, including that of human geniuses such as Einstein and Newton. Golem also explains how its intellect is dwarfed by an earlier transcended DOD Supercomputer called Honest Annie, whose intellect and abilities far exceed that of Golem.

The afterword is "written" by a Richard Popp, dated 2047. Popp, among other things, reports that Creve wanted to add a third part, of answers to a series of yes/no questions given to Golem XIV, but the computer abruptly ceased to communicate for unknown reasons.

=== Characteristics and concerns of Golem XIV ===
Lem has said that Golem XIV shares only a single trait with humans; "curiosity - a cool, avid, intense, purely intellectual curiosity which nothing can restrain or destroy. It constitutes our single meeting point."

== Film adaptation ==
A short animated film, GOLEM, was based on Golem XIV by Patrick Mccue and Tobias Wiesner.

== See also ==
- Colossus: The Forbin Project - a movie with a similar idea from a similar time
- Orion's Arm concept of technological singularity as a level of consciousness in individuals.
