= Dialogs (Lem) =

Book by Stanislav Lem

1972 expanded edition

Dialogs on the Atomic Resurrection, the Impossibility Theory, Philosophical Benefits of Cannibalism, Sadness in a Test Tube, Cybernetic Psychoanalysis, Electrical Metempsychosis, Evolutionary Feedbacks, Cybernetic Eschatology, Personalities of Electrical Networks, Perversity of Electrobrains, Eternal Life in a Box, Construction of Geniuses, Epilepsy of Capitalism, Governance Machines, Design of Social Systems — is a collection of philosophical essays by Stanisław Lem.

The first edition was printed in 1957 (Kraków, Wydawnictwo Literackie, 323 pages), the second, significantly expanded edition appeared in 1972 (Kraków, Wydawnictwo Literackie, 424 pages). The first dialog, about the "atomic resurrection" machine, was translated into English (from German) by Frank Prengel.

The style and the form of the book was borrowed from Three Dialogues between Hylas and Philonous by George Berkeley, including the names and the characters of the two disputants: Hylas and Philonous.

The essays were written in the most optimistic days of cybernetics, when infinite possibilities were expected from it. At the same time, it was only a year after cybernetics stopped being described as "bourgeois pseudoscience" in the Eastern Bloc.

The first edition contained eight dialogs. Later critics interpreted the length and convoluteness of the first six dialogs as a counter-censorship "smoke screen" for the main item: dialog VII, which in effect criticized the planned economy of the Eastern Bloc socialism.

The 1972 edition contained two annexes with two dialogs each.

Dialog I is about logical, ethical and philosophical problems related to the possibility of recreating a person as a perfect atom-wise copy. The dialog concludes that consciousness is not reducible to the mere physical composition and structure of a person, but at the same time this does not disprove the material nature of consciousness, pending the future progress of science.
