= Fables for Robots =

1964 series of short stories by Stanisław Lem

First edition (publ. Wydawnictwo Literackie) Cover design Szymon Kobyliński

Fables for Robots (Polish: Bajki Robotów) is a series of humorous science fiction short stories by Polish writer Stanisław Lem, first printed in 1964.

The fables are written in the grotesque form of folk fairy tales, set in the universe populated by robots. In this universe there are robot kings, robot peasants, robot knights, robot scientists; a robot damsel in distress is pestered by a robot dragon, robot dogs have robot fleas, etc.

The Fables constitute the bulk of the collection Mortal Engines (ISBN 0156621614) of translations by Michael Kandel. Two of them were also included into the 1981 collection The Cosmic Carnival of Stanislaw Lem (ISBN 0826400434).

Fables for Robots share the peculiar robot's universe, as well as the style, with the cycle The Cyberiad.

== Stories ==
In 1965 three of the fables, "Jak ocalał świat" ("How the World Survived"), "Maszyna Trurla" ("Trurl's Machine"), and "Wielkie lanie" ("The Great Spanking") were included into the cycle The Cyberiad.

On the other hand, one of the stories from The Cyberiad, "O królewiczu Ferrycym i królewnie Krystali" ("About Prince Ferricius and Princess Crystal"), stylistically belongs to the Fables cycle, but it was not in the original 1964 book.

The remaining fables are:

- "Trzej elektrycerze"/"The Three Electroknights"
- "Uranowe uszy"/"Uranium Ears"
- "Jak Erg Samowzbudnik Bladawca pokonał"/"How Erg the Self-Inducting Slew a Paleface"
- "Skarby króla Biskalara"/"Treasures of King Biskalar" (not translated into English)
- "Dwa potwory"/"Two Monsters"
- "Biała śmierć"/"The White Death"
- "Jak Mikromił i Gigacyan ucieczkę mgławic wszczęli"/"How Mikromil and Gigatian Provoked the Runaway of Nebulae" ("How Mocrox and Gigant Made the Universe Expand")
- "Bajka o maszynie cyfrowej, co ze smokiem walczyła" ("Tale of the Computer That Fought a Dragon"); also included into the 1991 Polish edition of the Cyberiad
- "Doradcy króla Hydropsa"/"The Advisers of King Hydrops"
- "Przyjaciel Automateusza"/"Automatthew's Friend"
- "Król Globares i mędrcy"/"King Globares and the Sages"
- "Bajka o królu Murdasie"/"The Tale of King Murdas"

Additionally the 1993 collection Pożytek ze smoka contained the short story "Zagadka" ("Riddle"), written in 1980, a discussion of Father Cynkan, M.D. (Doctor Magneticus) and Father Chlorjan about the apocryphal possibility of non-ferrous life and how such beings could reproduce, without any design documentation.

In 1975 an animated film Maszyna Trurla (8 min.) was released based on Lem's story (director Jerzy Zitzman, screenplay Leszek Mech).
