= Daniel Mróz =

Polish stage designer and artist

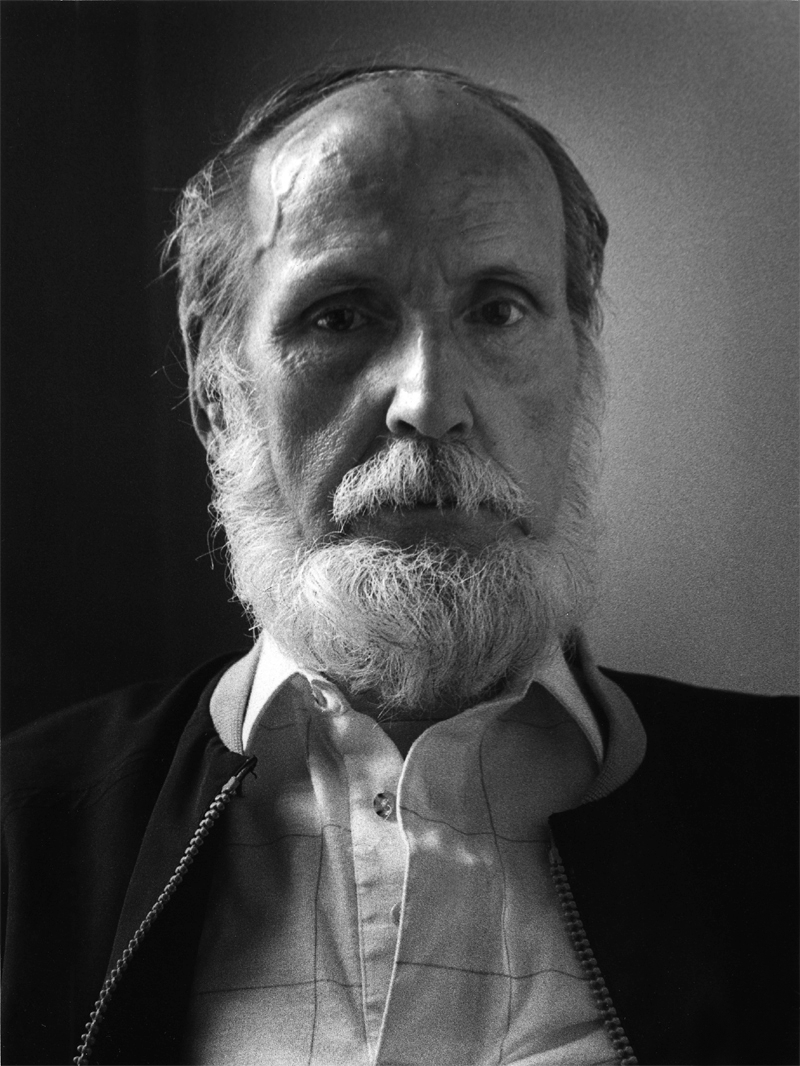
Daniel Mróz

Daniel Mróz (Polish pronunciation: [daɲɛl mrus]; 3 February 1917 in Kraków – 21 January 1993 in Kraków) – Polish stage designer and artist, illustrator of the science fiction books of Stanisław Lem and of the unique, absurd writings of Sławomir Mrożek.

== Youth ==
Daniel Mróz was born in Kraków, one of two sons of Stanisław Mróz, a journalist at "Ilustrowany Kurier Codzienny", one of the biggest Polish newspapers of the 1930s and at the same time the biggest Polish press publishing firm between the World Wars called for short IKC. Before the war Daniel Mróz obtained his baccalaureate degree and for two years studied at the School of Artistic Crafts in Kraków.

Immediately after the Second World War started with the invasion of Poland by Nazi Germany in September 1939, his father was arrested by the Germans for publishing a Polish newspaper without permission of the just-installed German occupations authorities. Soon afterwards, in the winter of 1940, his mother, unable to cope without her partner and father of her sons, died. In February 1941, his father, who was one of the first prisoners of Auschwitz-Birkenau, died there of illness and exhaustion. Official cause of his death was pneumonia. His ashes were sent by the German authorities to his sons for the burial.

== Studies ==
After the war, in 1945, Daniel Mróz illegally crossed the German border in order to find his former girlfriend, who had been taken to Ravensbrück. He was going to stay abroad, but eventually he made up his mind to go back to Poland. Upon his return to Kraków, he studied from 1946 at Fine Arts Academy. One of his professors, Marian Eile, had most influence on the young artist. He invited Daniel Mróz to work as an illustrator and a graphic designer of the popular Kraków weekly Przekrój, of which Eile was founder and editor-in-chief. Mróz has been working and studying, finally to complete the Academy's Graphic Department requirements and receive the diploma with honors in 1952.

== Artistic career ==
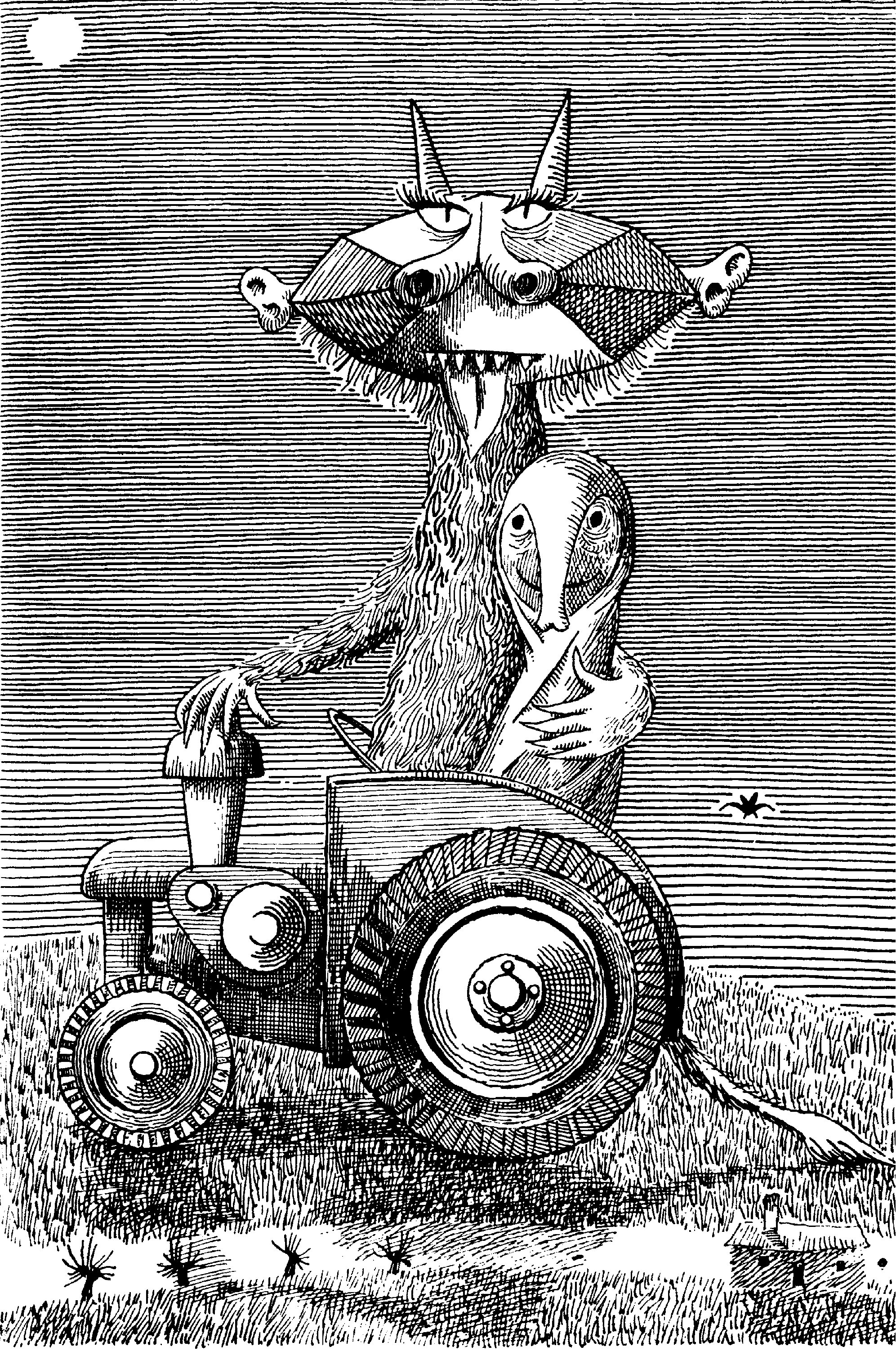
Illustration by Daniel Mróz for the short story by Sławomir Mrożek "The Elephant", 1957

In years 1951-1978 Mróz worked as an illustrator and cover designer for "Przekrój", creating a distinct style, full of humor and references to the art of the past century and being one of the elements which created popularity in Poland at the time weekly magazine. At the same time Daniel Mróz worked as a theater designer creating decors for different theater companies in Poland. He also had several shows of his work in Poland and abroad. But the real international recognition was brought to him by the covers and illustrations for the books of Stanisław Lem and Sławomir Mrożek. While Daniel Mróz illustrated many books by several other writers such as Franz Kafka, Jules Verne, Jerzy Szaniawski, Jan Stoberski, Ludwik Jerzy Kern, and Stanisław Jerzy Lec, illustrations for several Lem and Mrożek books became responsible for his popularity in Poland and abroad. These illustrations - a true graphic interpretation of the written word - become an essential element for the readers of these books and as such were reprinted in their numerous editions, all over the world.

== Private life ==
Daniel Mróz married Alina Nieniewska, a colleague from his studies at Fine Arts Academy in Kraków. He had one daughter - Łucja Mróz-Raynoch, also an artist, author of animated short films and a graphic designer.

== The value of Daniel Mróz work ==
Daniel Mróz's work remained highly valued. Created in the difficult era of Communist Poland, when realistic works were promoted by the authorities, these surreal black and white drawings and collages inspired several artists in Poland and abroad. In winter of 2011 Google's Doodle repeated his unique artistic style. Last years several monographs and catalogs listing works by Mróz were published, several serious shows of his graphic work were held and a short movie with the participation of Daniel Mróz has been re-issued on DVD.
