= Sepulca =

Sepulca Temporal range: Callovian–Late Jurassic

Scientific classification
- Kingdom: Animalia
- Phylum: Arthropoda
- Class: Insecta
- Order: Hymenoptera
- Family: †Sepulcidae
- Subfamily: †Sepulcinae
- Genus: †Sepulca; Rasnitsyn, 1968

Extinct genus of sawflies

Sepulca is an extinct genus of stem sawflies in the family Sepulcidae.

The genus Sepulca was identified by Alexandr Pavlovich Rasnitsyn. It was named by his colleague and a science-fiction author Kirill Eskov after fictional entities called sepulki, found in Stanisław Lem's The Star Diaries and Observation on the Spot. The relation to Lem's sepulki is understandable in both Polish and Russian, but their English translation obscures their association with ancient insects as they are translated as Scrupts in English editions of Lem's novels.

Sepulca includes two species, as well as a number of subspecies.

== Species ==
These two species belong to the genus Sepulca:

- † Sepulca mirabilis Rasnitsyn, 1968
- † Sepulca mongolica Rasnitsyn, 1993
