= Sepulenia =

Sepulenia Temporal range: Norian–Pliensbachian

Scientific classification
- Kingdom: Animalia
- Phylum: Arthropoda
- Class: Insecta
- Order: Hymenoptera
- Family: †Sepulcidae
- Genus: †Sepulenia; Rasnitsyn, 1968
- Species: †S. syricta

Binomial name
- †Sepulenia syricta Rasnitsyn, 1968

Extinct genus of sawflies

Sepulenia is an extinct genus of stem sawflies in the family Sepulcidae. There is one described species in Sepulenia, S. syricta.

The genus was identified by Alexandr Pavlovich Rasnitsyn. It was named after fictional things called sepulki, found in Stanisław Lem's The Star Diaries and Observation on the Spot. The name of the species is literally translated as "sepuling with whistle". The relation to Lem's sepulki is understandable in both Polish and Russian, but their English translation obscures their association with ancient insects as they are translated as Scrupts in English editions of Lem's novels.
