= Neologisms of Stanisław Lem =

Words coined in the science fiction by Polish author Stanisław Lem

Neologisms constitute a notable part of the writing style of Stanisław Lem, a Polish science fiction author and essayist.

Lem says that in building his neologisms, particularly of grotesque character, he uses the peculiarities of the Polish language. This presents difficulties to translators into non-Slavic languages, and critics often accused Lem of abusiveness in his creation of new words. Lem said that neologisms come up to him naturally in the course of writing only when they are necessary and that he is incapable of inventing one outside a context.

== Discussion ==
In handling his neologisms, Lem singles out two translators. Irmtraud Zimmermann-Göllheim (German), in Lem's opinion, remarkably succeeded in literal translation, while Michael Kandel (English) was inventive in finding semantic equivalents in English in difficult cases. He also singled out Russian mathematician Feliks Shirokov for finding fitting language equivalents in translation of Lem's grotesque-humorous works.

At the end of the novel Observation on the Spot Lem even included a "Polish-Polish dictionary" of the neologisms used in it (actually, an "Earthish-Earthish Glossary"). In a letter to publisher Franz Rottensteiner Lem wrote about his intention to add this glossary and to include into it an explanation why these neologisms are a necessity, not just a fantastic embellishment.

A number of Lem's words of particular note may be found in Wojciech Orliński's book What are Sepulkas?

Quite a few neologisms Lem introduced in his essays while envisioning future developments. For example, in his voluminous essay Summa Technologiae he coined the terms "phantomatics" for what is now known as virtual reality, "molectronics" for molecular nanotechnology, "cerebromatics" for cognitive enhancement, "imitology" for the creation of artificial life, "ariadnology" for the technology of search engines, and "intellectronics" for the technology of artificial intelligence.

The first works about Lem's language are dated by the early 1960s (Wesolowska 1963, Handke 1964, Moszyńska 1964).

Strategies for translating The Cyberiad's short story Jak ocalał świat (How the World was Saved), which relies on both nonsense neologisms and words which begin with the letter N in Polish, were discussed by Douglas Hofstadter in Le Ton beau de Marot.

In 2006 Monika Krajewska published a Polish-Russian dictionary of over 1,500 Lem's neologisms. Each entry is supplied with the reference to the source (often with quotations), as well as with an attempt of etymology: either an exact one, or an indication to the corresponding word formation rules, or suggested associations which could lie in the origins of the neologism in question. Same with Russian equivalents (sometimes more than one, due to multiple translations). For 28 neologisms Marcin Fastyn suggested different etymologies.

== See also ==
- Pćmy
