= Mad scientists in the works of Stanisław Lem =

Theme in the fiction of Stanisław Lem

Mad scientists and inventors appear in the fiction of Stanisław Lem in the memoirs of Lem's starfaring vagabond Ijon Tichy, collected in The Star Diaries and Memoirs of a Space Traveller, as well as in The Cyberiad. Most of Lem's mad scientist stories fit into the format of stories about unusual inventions, known since the 19th century, most of them are devoid of ironic tone characteristic of most of Ijon Tichy's stories and robots' fables, and they are literary frames for various Lem's theories.

Lem's mad scientists include professors Corcoran, who created several artificial universes in isolated lockers; Decantor, who created an immortal soul, Zazul, who cloned himself and was apparently killed by the clone who took his place; Diagoras, who created progressing makes of an "independent and self-perfecting device that is capable of spontaneous thought" and was unwittingly used by two such devices as a communication medium; doctor Vliperdius, a robot doctor who runs an asylum for mentally ill robots; and professor A. Dońda.

Kamil Rosiński suggested that a prototype to Lem's brilliant eccentric scientists could have been psychologist and philosopher Mieczysław Choynowski, who was Lem's mentor for some time.

Dońda catastrophically succeeded in his quest to prove mass-information equivalence, analogous to mass–energy equivalence: by accumulating a huge amount of useless information in a supercomputer, Donda made the total amount of information accumulated by humanity to cross a certain threshold, after which it all converted into a new universe, leaving humanity without any knowledge.

Professor mathematician Ammon Lymphater from the 1961 short story "Lymphater's Formula" after studying the biology of a rare species of ants devised and constructed "It" capable of instant precognition of everything within "Its" rapidly expanding perception range. Realizing that the Superentity "It" renders the human civilization redundant and obsolete, Lymphater destroys "It". "It" already knew Lymphater's intentions, but was not worried, knowing that sooner or later some one else will create "It" again and again, eventually something would arise that would amount to an artificial God...

Physicist Molteris (1961 short story Fizyk Molteris) invented a time machine and died during time travel forward, oblivious to the fact that he will age with time.

Some of these professors and some more unnamed ones, in the words of Peter Swirski, strove to "inflict social panacea on entire populations", a part of Lem's philosophical analysis of social engineering.

Professor Farragus from Lem's early novelette Koniec świata o ósmej (End of the World at Eight O'Clock) irritated by a non-recognition of his fundamental discovery decides to prove he is right by destructing the Universe.

In the 28th Voyage of Tichy's Star Diaries, it is revealed that there were mad scientists in the family of Tichy himself: his grandfather, Jeremiasz Tichy "decided to create the General Theory of Everything, and nothing stopped him from doing this".

A fictional review of a non-existing book Non Serviam supposedly written by Professor James Dobb, discuses Dobb's ideas about "personetics", the simulated creation of intelligent beings ("personoids") inside a computer, a development of professor Corcoran's ideas.

Professor Cezar Kouska (alias Benedykt Kouska), in his two (fictional) books De Impossibilitate Vitae and De Impossibilitate Prognoscendi ( ("On the Impossibility of Life" and "On the Impossibility of Prognostication"), "reviewed" by Lem in A Perfect Vacuum proves that life is impossible and the probability theory is a bunk. Professor Kouska is the namesake of "Kouska's fallacy" in reasoning about concurrent happening of two highly improbable real-life events: in calculating of the probability of such a happening it is fallacious to assume that they are independent.

The short story Professor Zazul first appeared in the 1961 collection Księga robotów (Robots' Book). It served as a base of a TV short film Profesor Zazul directed by Marek Nowicki and Jerzy Stawicki (shot in 1962, produced in 1965, premiered on August 27, 1968).

An encounter of Tichy with professor Corcoran was made into a TV show Przypadek Ijona Tichego (1999) by Lech Raczak.

The story of professor Decantor raises a philosophical question of whether immortality has an inherent worth. Decantor gave immortality to his wife by writing the contents of her mind on a crystal, but this involved termination of her physical existence. Tichy argues this was in fact murder rather than afterlife. In his opinion, an eternal life without external sensations would be the worst torment ever. "People do not want immortality.<...> They simply do not want to die. They want to live, professor. They want to feel the ground under the feet, to see the clouds above the heads, to love other people, to be with them, and to think about this. Noting more."

== See also ==
- Professor Tarantoga
