= Professor A. Dońda =

1986 novella by Stanislaw Lem

Professor A. Dońda (From the Memoirs of Ijon Tichy) (Polish: Profesor A. Dońda (Ze wspomnień Ijona Tichego) is a satirical apocalyptic science fiction novelette by Polish writer Stanisław Lem. It was first published in a satirical magazine Szpilki in 1973 and later republished in several collections and anthologies.

It was translated into French (1977), German (1978, 1980), Portuguese (1987), English (2020), Spanish (2021), Russian (1988, 1993) and Ukrainian (2017).

== Plot ==
The novel is a "story within a story". The "frame story" starts with the author (Ijon Tichy) complaining that he has to cut his memoir in clay tablets, the way Babylonians did. This unfortunate situation resulted from the world ignoring the warning of professor Dońda (whose sidekick was Ijon Tichy), who established that information has a kind of "critical mass", and when it is exceeded, similar to uranium, a destructive chain reaction may happen. Tichy then proceeds to tell the story of the professor.

The plot of ‘Dońda’ is set after an informational holocaust, a result of the transformation of information into mass by Dońda, which caused the disappearance of the contents of all computerised data banks. Although it caused enormous destruction in the much better computerised First World, it brought enormous relief to the Third World, which no longer had to be in hot pursuit of a vanishing target. Not only did modern arms became unusable, but the global monetary system with the US dollar as the major world currency also collapsed, thus forcing humanity back to the paradise which it had lost when it became civilised.

Wojciech Orliński writes that professor Affidavid Dońda is one of the most sympathetic geniuses of Lem. His whole life, literally from his very conception including his first and last names, was a chain of errors and coincidences, which had eventually led to his discovery and the ignored prediction of the catastrophe. His exploits in the fictional African country of Gurunduwaju is an acute satirical allegory of Polish People's Republic of 1970s.

== Dońda's Law ==
The doomsday conclusion was derived from the following "Dońda's Law":

"Whatever a small computer with a large program can do, a big computer with a small program can do the same; hence the logical conclusion is that an infinitely large program can work alone, i.e. without any computer".

Dońda further explains his reasoning: "Well, what does it mean that infinitely much information can work directly, without the help of any devices? This means that the enormity of information will manifest itself directly. I figured it out, but I didn't know the formula of equivalence [similar to the mass–energy equivalence ]. ... Simply, how much information weighs. So I had to devise this whole project. I had to. Now I know. The machine became 0.01 grams heavier: that is the weight of the information entered."

== Commentary ==
Jerzy Jarzębski in his afterword to Dzienniki gwiazdowe writes that the story of professor Dońda is not only a "comedy of errors" but also an illustration of Lem's idea that the chance is a driving force of the change, expounded by Lem in his essay The Philosophy of Chance. In the words of Dońda, the whole evolution "is based on the error, because an error imprints onto an error, turns out to be an error, creates an error, so that chance [losowość in the original] turns into the Fate of the World [Los Świata]".

The catastrophic finale of the novel resembles that of another adventure of Ijon Tichy: Peace on Earth ends with a silent devastation of the whole Earth's technological infrastructure and information stored in it. Jerzy Jarzębski observes that it also resembles the finales of other Lem's novels: The Invincible, and Memoirs Found in a Bathtub.
