= Sepulcidae =

Sepulcidae Temporal range: Norian–Campanian

Scientific classification
- Domain: Eukaryota
- Kingdom: Animalia
- Phylum: Arthropoda
- Class: Insecta
- Order: Hymenoptera
- Superfamily: Cephoidea
- Family: †Sepulcidae; Rasnitsyn, 1968

Extinct family of sawflies

Sepulcidae is an extinct family of stem sawflies in the order Hymenoptera. The family is known primarily from late Mesozoic fossils found in 1968 in Transbaikalia. The insects were distant relatives of modern sawflies and are part of the living superfamily Cephoidea.

The genus Sepulca was identified by Alexandr Pavlovich Rasnitsyn. It was named by his colleague and a science-fiction author Kirill Eskov after fictional entities called sepulki, found in Stanisław Lem's The Star Diaries and Observation on the Spot. The relation to Lem's sepulki is understandable in both Polish and Russian, but their English translation obscures their association with ancient insects as they are translated as Scrupts in English editions of Lem's novels.

== Genera ==
These 17 genera belong to the family Sepulcidae:

- Subfamily Sepulcinae Rasnitsyn, 1968
  - † Sepulca Rasnitsyn, 1968
  - † Sepulenia Rasnitsyn, 1968
- Subfamily Parapamphiliinae Rasnitsyn, 1968
  - † Micramphilius Rasnitsyn, 1993
  - † Pamparaphilius Rasnitsyn, 1993
  - † Parabakharius Rasnitsyn, 1993
  - † Parapamphilius Rasnitsyn, 1968
  - † Shurabisca Rasnitsyn, 1968
  - † Sogutia Rasnitsyn, 1977
- Subfamily Xyelulinae Rasnitsyn, 1993
  - † Neoxyelula Rasnitsyn, 1993
  - † Onokhoius Rasnitsyn, 1990
  - † Xyelula Rasnitzyn, 1969
- Subfamily Trematothoracinae Rasnitsyn, 1988
  - † Prosyntexis Sharkey, 1990
  - † Thoracotrema Rasnitsyn, 1988
  - † Trematothorax Rasnitsyn, 1988 (= Trematothoracoides Zhang, Zhang & Wei, 2001)
- Subfamily Ghilarellinae Rasnitsyn, 1988
  - † Ghilarella Rasnitsyn, 1988
  - † Meiaghilarella Rasnitsyn & Martinez-Delclos, 2000
- Subfamily incertae sedis
  - † Xaxexis Pagliano & Scaramozzino, 1989
