= His Master's Voice (2018 film) =

- Directed by: György Pálfi
- Screenplay by: György Pálfi; Zsófia Ruttkay; Gergö V. Nagy
- Based on: His Master's Voice; 1968 novel by Stanisław Lem
- Produced by: Charles V. Bender; Michael Dobbin; Ferenc Pusztai
- Starring: Kate Vernon; Marshall Williams
- Cinematography: Gergely Pohárnok
- Edited by: Réka Lemhényi
- Music by: György Mohai
- Release date: December 20, 2018
- Running time: 108 minutes
- Countries: Canada; Hungary; France; Sweden; United States
- Languages: English; Hungarian

His Master's Voice (Hungarian: Az Úr hangja, lit. 'The Voice of The Lord') is a 2018 Hungarian science fiction film by György Pálfi loosely based on the novel His Master's Voice by Polish science fiction writer Stanisław Lem.

== Plot summary ==
The film follows a man who thinks he saw his father in a documentary about a mysterious incident in Colorado, around which a conspiracy theory had been formed. He embarks on the search of his father, who had fled Communist Hungary years ago. Eventually he finds his father, now a well-off university professor with a new family, but whose life is still affected by his previous work to decode the "message from space".

== Cast ==
- Kate Vernon as Camille
- Eric Peterson as Hogarth
- Jenna Warren as Isobel
- Marshall Williams as Chris
- Andrew Moodie as Agent Simmons
- Benz Antoine as Jerome Vick Jr.

== Production ==
The film was backed by a $2.54 million grant from the Hungarian National Film Fund. While the majority of filming was in Hungary, His Master's Voice was also shot in various locations around Ottawa, Canada. The film has elements of mockumentary, featuring shots with outdated cameras and formats.

His Master's Voice premiered at the 2018 Tokyo International Film Festival. At the 2019 Fantasporto International Film Festival, the film received the prize for the Best Visual Effects.
