= The Philosophy of Chance =

Essay by Stanisław Lem

First edition

The Philosophy of Chance, with subtitle "Literature in the Light of Empiricism" (Polish: Filozofia przypadku. Literatura w świetle empirii) is an essay by Polish author Stanisław Lem on the literary theory and the influence of literature on the modern culture. However, as literary critic Henryk Markiewicz noted, the subtitle is somewhat misleading: starting with Lem's take on literary theory, the essay turns into the "General Theory of Everything": of the Universe, evolution, and culture, based on a premise that chance, eventuality is the universal factor.

The essay was first published in 1968 by Wydawnictwo Literackie as a book of over 600 pages.

== Lem's literary theory ==
In the essay, Lem criticizes the contemporary literary theory, in particular, Roman Ingarden's Literary Work of Art, and proceeds with his own. He cautions that he deals only with the ontological side of the issue, disregarding the esthetical side of literature.

Lem's exposition draw on analogies from various natural sciences: probability theory, information theory, computer science, etc. The major idea is that a literary work must be considered as an infinite set of its readings. The literary text per se is just an "input instruction set" of an "information program", and each reader subject to it produces a particular concretization, which depends on the reader's worldview at the moment of reading, which, in its turn, depends on the established cultural norms. For example, Lem notices that Kafka's "In the Penal Colony" immediately brings associations with Nazi death camps in modern reader's mind, although in 1914 Kafka could not have been describing these camps. This observation gives Lem an incentive to consider unpredictable arbitrariness in the literary analysis of a particular text.

At the same time, there are certain kinds of texts which have a rather rigid structure, which rely on a single possible way of perception to make them meaningful (e.g., jokes) or based on certain pre-set standards and expectations (e.g., detective story). As Lem himself summarized, "The more original a work, or the more it deviates from the generic model, the more diverse are its interpretation possibilities - like a Rorschach test."

== Chance in cultural dynamics ==
In subsequent editions of the essay the view on literature as a domain of random processes was expanded by Lem on culture as a whole, where random forces drive the realizations of eventualities in culture in unpredictable directions. Nevertheless, Lem stops short of declaring chance or "blind fate" as a dominating force in cultural dynamics. In reality forces of chaos are counteracted by the forces of order and purpose. At the same time, Lem's essay instructs to try and recognize the act of Chance in situations where one would expect an act of Purpose.

== Chance in Lem's works ==
The concept of chance as the force which contests the cause-effect relationship is present in Lem's science fiction since his earliest works

The plots of Lem's novels, The Investigation, The Chain of Chance, and His Master's Voice are significantly based on this concept.

Also, in Hospital of the Transfiguration Sekulowski, an eccentric poet and philosopher hiding from the Nazis in an asylum, subscribes to the "philosophy of chance".

The plot of the novel Professor A. Dońda is based on a chain of errors, suggesting that the chance is a driving force of the change.
