= Ijon Tichy: Space Pilot =

2007 German TV series

- Created by: Randa Chahoud, Dennis Jacobsen, Oliver Jahn
- Based on: The Star Diaries by Stanisław Lem
- Starring: Oliver Jahn, Nora Tschirner
- Composer: Eike Groenewold
- Country of origin: Germany
- Original language: German
- No. of seasons: 2
- No. of episodes: 14

Production
- Producers: Kosmische Kollegen, Karsten Aurich, German Film and Television Academy Berlin

Original release
- Network: ZDF
- Release: 26 March 2007

Ijon Tichy: Space Pilot (German: Ijon Tichy: Raumpilot) is a satiric German television series loosely based on the series of science fiction stories The Star Diaries by Stanisław Lem. The television series was created by Randa Chahoud, Dennis Jacobsen, and Oliver Jahn, with Jahn playing the protagonist, space traveller Ijon Tichy. The major female role, the female robot hologramme, is played by Nora Tschirner.

The first season was aired from 26 March 2007 on ZDF on Mondays at 23:55 hours. One week before the airing, each episode used to be published online as a streaming video on ZDF mediathek, an online repository operated by ZDF. In November 2011, the second season (Ijon Tichy: Raumpilot II) was aired on ZDFneo. Both seasons are available on DVD, with the second season having English subtitles.

== Plot ==
Ijon Tichy, a sort of Baron Munchausen in space, navigates the universe in his "three-bedroom rocket", which looks like a French press with windows from the outside. His homemade female robot Analoge Halluzinelle, a hologramme, is his ubiquitous companion. The part is played by Nora Tschirner. Together they experience various adventures on alien planets, inside cosmic eddies, or within their own spacecraft. Tichy narrates the stories with an artificial Eastern European accent, a nod towards the origin of the show (based on stories by Polish writer Stanisław Lem). The plot features many comic and satirically exaggerated situations that are often aimed at popular genres.

Other recurring characters in the films are professor Tarantoga, Tarantoga's humanoid assistant Mel, and doctor Miroslav Spamy.

== Production ==
The series is based on The Star Diaries and other works by Stanisław Lem that involve Ijon Tichy. From this material, Randa Chahoud, Dennis Jacobsen and Oliver Jahn, fellow students at the German Film and Television Academy Berlin (dffb), created two short films Aus den Sterntagebüchern des Ijon Tichy [From the Star Diaries of Ijon Tichy] (1999) and Aus den Sterntagebüchern des Ijon Tichy II (2000). The former won the audience award at the Hamburg International Short Film Festival in 1999. In 2005, Chahoud, Jacobsen and Jahn founded a production company, Kosmische Kollegen [Cosmic Colleagues]. Together with Karsten Aurich of Sabotage Films and dffb they were contracted by the ZDF network to realise the television series.

The set utilises numerous retro style items like household tools from the 1980s and 90s. Tichy's spacecraft is a giant French press that looks like an old Berlin apartment inside. Alien characters have been created with deliberately simple means. Many of the alien and robot characters utilized various forms of puppetry and animatronics. The first season was shot in Oliver Jahn's former apartment and since he moved house between the two seasons his original home was recreated in a studio for the filming of the second season.

== List of episodes ==
The first season comprises six episodes of 15 minutes each that were aired from 26 March 2007 to 7 May 2007 on ZDF.

=== Season 1 (2007) ===
No.	Title	Original release date
1	"Kosmische Kollegen" (Note: inspired by The Fourteenth Voyage of Lem's Star Diaries) "Cosmic Colleagues"	26 March 2007
2	"Planet der Reserven" "Planet of Reserves"	2 April 2007
3	"Relativistische Effekte" (Note: inspired by The Seventh Voyage of Lem's Star Diaries) "Relativistic Effects"	26 March 2007
4	"Der futurologische Kongress" (Note: inspired by The Eighth Voyage of Lem's Star Diaries; unrelated to Lem's novel The Futurological Congress) "The Futurological Congress"	23 April 2007
5	"Sabotage"	30 April 2007
6	"Die innere Stimme" "The inner Voice"	7 May 2007

=== Season 2 (2011) ===
The second season consists of 8 double episodes of 24 minutes length each that were aired in double sequences between 4 and 25 November 2011 on ZDFneo.

No.	Title	Original release date
1	"Held von Kosmos" "Hero of Cosmos"	4 November 2011
2	"Shøpping"	4 November 2011
3	"Schön schaumig" "Pleasantly foamy"	11 November 2011
4	"Biste fix Zeitblasen" "Be Quick Time Bubbles"	11 November 2011
5	"Sepulken verboten" "Sepulking prohibited"	18 November 2011
6	"Das Erinnerungsstück" "The Souvenir"	18 November 2011
7	"Schein und Sein I" "Appearance and Being I"	25 November 2011
8	"Schein und Sein II" "Appearance and Being II"	25 November 2011

== Recognition ==
Year	Award	Category	Result
2007	German Television Award	Talent award	Won
2007	First Steps – German Young Talent Award	Short and animated films under 25 minutes	Nominated
2008	New York Festivals	Television Entertainment Programs, Comedy/Satire	Bronze
2008	Adolf Grimme Award	Fiction	Nominated
2012	Curt Siodmak Prize (de:Curt-Siodmak-Preis)	Best TV Series	Won
2012	Curt Siodmak Prize (de:Curt-Siodmak-Preis)	Special prize for German and German-language productions	Won

Asteroids 343000 Ijontichy and 343444 Halluzinelle are named in commemoration of the series.
