= Zazul =

Zazul may refer to:

- One of mad scientists of Stanisław Lem
- A populated place in Kaseliyan Rural District, Iran
