= Smartdust =

System of microelectromechanical devices

Smartdust is a system of many tiny microelectromechanical systems (MEMS) such as sensors, robots, or other devices, that can detect, for example, light, temperature, vibration, magnetism, or chemicals. They are usually operated on a computer network wirelessly and are distributed over some area to perform tasks, usually sensing through radio-frequency identification. Without an antenna of much greater size the range of tiny smart dust communication devices is measured in a few millimeters and they may be vulnerable to electromagnetic disablement and destruction by microwave exposure.

== Design and engineering ==
The concepts for Smart Dust emerged from a workshop at RAND in 1992 and a series of DARPA ISAT studies in the mid-1990s due to the potential military applications of the technology. The work was strongly influenced by work at UCLA and the University of Michigan during that period, as well as science fiction authors Stanislaw Lem (in novels The Invincible in 1964 and Peace on Earth in 1985), Neal Stephenson and Vernor Vinge. The first public presentation of the concept by that name was at the American Vacuum Society meeting in Anaheim in 1996.

A Smart Dust research proposal was presented to DARPA written by Kristofer S. J. Pister, Joe Kahn, and Bernhard Boser, all from the University of California, Berkeley, in 1997. The proposal, to build wireless sensor nodes with a volume of one cubic millimeter, was selected for funding in 1998. The project led to a working mote smaller than a grain of rice, and larger "COTS Dust" devices kicked off the TinyOS effort at Berkeley.

The concept was later expanded upon by Kris Pister in 2001. A recent review discusses various techniques to take smartdust in sensor networks beyond millimeter dimensions to the micrometre level.

The Ultra-Fast Systems component of the Nanoelectronics Research Centre at the University of Glasgow is a founding member of a large international consortium which is developing a related concept: smart specks.

Smart Dust entered the Gartner Hype Cycle on Emerging Technologies in 2003, and returned in 2013, as the most speculative entrant.

In 2022, a Nature paper written by Shyamnath Gollakota, Vikram Iyer, Hans Gaensbauer and Thomas Daniel, all from the University of Washington, presented tiny light-weight programmable battery-free wireless sensors that can be dispersed in the wind. These devices were inspired by Dandelion seeds that can travel as far as a kilometer in dry, windy, and warm conditions.

== Conspiracy theories ==
Smartdust has figured in conspiracy theories that claim microscopic devices are dispersed by aircraft ("chemtrails") or injected via vaccines to enable tracking or mind control. A peer-reviewed survey of atmospheric scientists found no evidence for a secret large-scale atmospheric spraying program and concluded that purported "chemtrail" evidence is consistent with ordinary contrails and atmospheric deposition. Fact-checking organizations have likewise found no evidence for related claims, including that Hitachi's so-called "smart dust" RFID chip has GPS capability or could function if ingested, and that COVID-19 vaccines contain microchips or "nanobots"; the lipid nanoparticles in mRNA vaccines are delivery vehicles for RNA, not tracking devices. Analyses of social-media discourse further indicate that the chemtrails narrative dominates much online discussion of geoengineering despite scientific rejection of the theory.

== Social and ethical concerns ==
The impact of smart dust on society may involve thousands to millions of sensors that can float in the air and be inhaled. The long-term health effects of this exposure are unknown, which creates uncertainty and worry. Possible risks include respiratory problems or effects on the nervous system, though nothing has been confirmed. Because these sensors are largely invisible, they can create a feeling of being monitored by an unseen presence (i.e., the risk of unauthorized surveillance and data collection). The smart dust technology could be misused for unethical purposes, potentially leading to public trust issues. Therefore, clear ethical rules from the government are needed to make sure smart dust is used in a way that respects people and humanitarian law. Smart dust could widen social inequalities, affecting not just countries but also different social groups and individuals.

The application of smart dust has led to discussion about potential privacy concerns, mainly due to the extremely small size (invisible eyes) of the devices, which makes them difficult to detect. Because smart dust sensors are designed to be embedded in their environment and operate without being easily noticed, this lack of physical visibility has been cited as a factor that makes it difficult to know when and where monitoring is happening. This has raised concerns that these devices may collect information from people who have not explicitly given their consent.

== Economic and environmental concerns ==
Integrating smart dust into existing systems is very expensive, especially when it is deployed in large systems or satellites. Because of the high costs, many organizations cannot afford it. Another problem is control. Since smart dust devices are extremely small, they are hard to detect and difficult to remove if they stop working properly. If something goes wrong, authorities may not be able to control them and the devices could interfere with existing systems and cause failures.

The volume of smart dust that could be engaged by a rogue individual, company or government to do harm would make it challenging to predict the environmental effects, especially when the motes stop functioning. Smart dust can contain hazardous materials, which can affect the ecosystem. The devices can contribute to increased carbon emissions which is another environmental concern. Some environmental concerns might be raised about motes that draw on radioactive power sources. Improper disposal of these miniature devices can result in environmental contamination, similar to how microplastics accumulate and persist in ecosystems.

== See also ==
- Claytronics – Matter which can change its physical properties in a programmable fashion
- A Deepness in the Sky – 1999 novel by Vernor Vinge
- The Diamond Age – 1995 novel by Neal Stephenson
- Dust Networks – American semiconductor manufacturer
- Grey goo – Hypothetical end-of-the-world scenario
- The Invincible – 1964 novel by Stanisław Lem
- Mesh networking – Network with multiple links between nodes
- Nanotechnology – Technology with features near one nanometer
- Neural dust – Nerve sensors used in brain-computer interfaces
- Prey (novel) – 2002 novel by Michael Crichton
- Programmable matter – Matter which can change its physical properties in a programmable fashion
- RFID – Electronic tracking technology
- Self-reconfiguring modular robot – Robot that can rearrange its own parts
- Smart camera – Machine vision system
- Smart camera network
- TinyOS
- Ubiquitous computing – Concept in software engineering and computer science
- Unconventional computing – Computing by new or unusual methods
- Utility fog – Concept of a swarm of tiny robots
- Wireless sensor network – Group of spatially dispersed and dedicated sensors
