= Koniec świata o ósmej =

"Koniec świata o ósmej" ("End of the World at Eight O'Clock") is an early (1947) science fiction novelette by Polish writer Stanisław Lem. Professor Farragus claims that he discovered a "matter detonator" substance, which, when heated, starts a chain reaction causing the destruction of all matter. Irritated by a non-recognition of his fundamental discovery, and mockery, he decides to prove he is right by destroying the Universe.

== Publication history ==
It was first printed in Co Tydzień Powieść, Katowice, 1947, no.67, p. 2-12.

The collection Dzienniki gwiazdowe (The Star Diaries), Warszawa, Iskry, 1957, includes a revised version under the title "Koniec świata o ósmej (Bajka amerykańska)", although it is not related to Ijon Tichy, the protagonist of the Star Diaries. Wojciech Orliński writes that Koniec... and two other stories were added to the collection simply because there was not enough volume for a book with Tychy's stories only.

In 1974 it was translated into Russian as "Конец света в восемь часов. Американская сказка" (by Yevgeniy Vaysbrot) in the anthology "Симпозиум мыслелётчиков"

In 1979 it was translated into German as "Weltuntergang um acht" in the collection Die Falle des Gargancjan.

In 1986 it was translated into Italian as "Fine del mondo alle 8".

In 1989 it was translated into Latvian as "Pasaules gals pulksten astoņos vakarā"

The early version was reprinted in Lem's selection of early works Lata czterdzieste / Dyktanda (2005, ISBN 83-08-03755-0).

== Adaptations ==
In 1958 a TV play Koniec świata o godzinie ósmej was released by Telewizja Polska, in which Janusz Strachocki starred as Farragus.

In 1969 Polskie Radio premiered a radio play based on the story.

In May 2015, Polish TV broadcast the play Koniec świata o ósmej created by theatre "Sfinks" (an attempt of the revival of the scene "Sfinks" of the Theatre of Sensation and Science Fiction "Kobra". Previously "Sfinks" aired this play on December 19, 1963.

== See also ==
- Mad scientists of Stanisław Lem
- Ice-nine from Cat's Cradle
