= Message from Space (disambiguation) =

Message from Space is a 1978 Japanese science fiction film.

Message from Space may also refer to:

- Message from space (science fiction), a science fiction theme
- Message from Space: Galactic Wars a TV series spin-off of the film
- The Third Planet from Altair, by Edward Packard, a Choose Your Own Adventure book reissued as Message from Space
- A short story, "A Message from Space" (Joseph Schlossel, Weird Tales, March 1926)

== See also ==
- Signal from Space (disambiguation)
