= The Futurological Congress =

1971 novel by Stanisław Lem

- Cover of the first English-language edition
- Author: Stanisław Lem
- Original title: Ze wspomnień Ijona Tichego Kongres futurologiczny
- Translator: Michael Kandel
- Cover artist: Menten Ted (1st English edition)
- Language: Polish
- Genre: Science fiction; Black humour
- Publisher: Seabury Press (1st English edition)
- Publication date: 1971
- Publication place: Poland
- English publication date: 1974
- Media type: Print
- ISBN: 0-15-634040-2
- OCLC: 11812537
- Dewey Decimal: 891.8/537 19
- LC Class: PG7158.L39 Z413 1985

The Futurological Congress (Polish: Kongres futurologiczny) is a 1971 black humour science fiction novel by Polish author Stanisław Lem. It details the exploits of the hero of a number of his stories, Ijon Tichy, as he visits the Eighth World Futurological Congress at a Hilton Hotel in Costa Rica.^{[note 1]} The book is Lem's take on the science fictional trope of an apparently Utopian future that turns out to be an illusion.

== Overview ==
The book opens at the eponymous congress. A riot breaks out, and the hero, Ijon Tichy, is hit by various psychoactive drugs that were put into the drinking water supply lines by the government to pacify the riots. Ijon and a few others escape to the safety of a sewer beneath the Hilton where the congress was being held, and in the sewer he goes through a series of hallucinations and false awakenings, which cause him to be confused about whether or not what's happening around him is real. Finally, he believes that he falls asleep and wakes up many years later. The main part of the book follows Ijon's adventures in the future world — a world where everyone takes hallucinogenic drugs, and hallucinations have replaced reality.

== Plot summary ==
Ijon Tichy is sent to the Eighth World Futurological Congress in Costa Rica^{[1]} by professor Tarantoga. The conference is set to focus on the world's overpopulation crisis and ways of dealing with it. It is held at the Costa Rica Hilton in Nounas, which is 164 stories tall. Lem is fiercely satirical from the start, and absurdities abound at the Hilton with its guaranteed "BOMB-FREE" rooms and the extravagances of Tichy's suite, which include a palm grove and an "all-girl orchestra [that] played Bach while performing a cleverly choreographed striptease".

The conference itself is no less absurd. Papers and presenters are too numerous to allow for full presentations. Instead, papers are distributed in hard copy and speakers call out paragraph numbers to call attention to their most salient points.

In the middle of his first night at the conference, Tichy drinks some tap water in his hotel room, and his wild hallucinogenic trip begins, though it never becomes any more or less absurd than the brief glimpse of reality Lem presents in the beginning of the book (if indeed the congress is meant to be reality). He realizes the next day that the government has drugged the public water supply with "benignimizers", a drug that makes the victim helplessly benevolent. Events spiral out of control at the Hilton, which was already so chaotic that charred corpses from bombing attacks would be covered with tarps where they lay while guests went about their business.

The government ends up bombing the hotel, and Tichy escapes into the sewer, where rats walk around on their hind legs. Tichy is evacuated from the scene by the military: first he escapes by jetpack, only to realise he is hallucinating (falling in the sewer water to find he never left). After returning to reality, he is rescued again and this time evacuated by helicopter, but during his rescue the helicopter crashes, and he awakes in the hospital, where he finds that his brain has been transplanted into the body of an attractive young black woman.

Protesters attack the hospital, and Tichy is nearly killed again. This time when he wakes up, he finds that he has been transplanted into the body of an overweight, red-haired man, however this too is an illusion (again, broken when Tichy falls into the sewer water). When the military once again arrive to rescue everyone in the sewer Tichy refuses to move, believing that it is another illusion. He is then found by counter-revolutionaries, who shoot him. Awaking in another hospital, Tichy's mental state grows increasingly fragile as he cannot distinguish reality from hallucination (giving the staff inane nicknames, such as "Hallucinathan" and "Hallucinda"), and the medical staff make the decision to freeze him until a time when medicine can help his condition.

He awakes in the year 2039, and at this point, the novel adopts the format of a journal that Tichy keeps to chronicle his experience in this new world. His future shock is so great that he finds he is being introduced to the world in small stages by the medical staff.

In most regards, this future society is Utopian. Money is no object. One can simply go to the bank and request any sum and borrow it interest-free. There is no effort made to collect the debt, either, as most people take a drug that instills a sense of pride and work-ethic, which would disallow defaulting on the debt.

Tichy learns that there is an inherent bias against defrostees, and that there are a great deal of words that he does not understand. Like cityspeak, and many other sci-fi futuristic languages, it is a mishmash of words with clear enough English roots, though Tichy is mystified by it. Also, mood is highly regulated by drugs. Tichy gets involved with a woman, and during an argument, she deliberately takes a drug called recriminol to make her more combative, which prolongs the tiff.

Following their break-up, Tichy becomes deeply disillusioned with the "psychem" mentality, wherein drugs regulate every waking moment of the day. He resolves to stop taking any drugs and confides to his friend, professor Trottelreiner, that he can't stand this new world. Trottelreiner explains that the Narcotics and hallucinogens that Tichy is tired of are trifles compared to "mascons", which are so powerful that they mask whole swaths of reality.

Trottelreiner explains, "mascon" derives from mask, masquerade, mascara: "By introducing properly prepared mascons to the brain, one can mask any object in the outside world behind a fictitious image—superimposed—and with such dexterity, that the psychemasconated subject cannot tell which of his perceptions have been altered, and which have not. If but for a single instant you could see this world of ours the way it really is — undoctored, unadulterated, uncensored — you would drop in your tracks!"

The professor then gives Tichy a flask of "up'n'at'm, one of the vigilanimides, a powerful countersomniac and antipsychem agent. A derivative of dimethylethylhexabutylpeptopeyotine". With his first sniff of up'n'at'm, Tichy watches as the gilded surroundings of the five-star restaurant they are in evaporates into a dingy concrete bunker, and his stuffed pheasant turns into "the most unappetizing gray-brown gruel, which stuck in globs to my tin — no longer silver — fork".

This first dose, however, marks only the beginning of Tichy's journey. He gradually discovers that people no longer drive cars or use elevators. Instead, they run through the streets and climb the walls of abandoned elevator shafts, explaining why everyone in this strange new world seems constantly out of breath. Robots patrol the streets, whipping people and maintaining order. With each successive dose of the increasingly powerful up'n'at'm, Tichy experiences more disturbing visions of this world. These culminate in a frozen, nightmarish landscape where people sleep peacefully beneath the snow, while the police robots are revealed to be humans who have been conditioned to believe they are machines. This revelation also explains the persistent coldness Tichy has sensed since arriving in this unfamiliar world.

In a state of panic, Tichy realizes that he is "no longer safely inside the illusion, but shipwrecked in reality", and he desperately seeks the seat of power. He ascends in a skyscraper to encounter his acquaintance George P. Symington Esquire, who sits in a modest office and explains to Tichy that he and a few others employ mascons as a way of maintaining order:

"The year is 2098 ... with 69 billion inhabitants legally registered and approximately another 26 billion in hiding. The average annual temperature has fallen four degrees. In fifteen or twenty years there will be glaciers here. We have no way of averting or halting their advance — we can only keep them secret."
"I always thought there would be ice in hell," I said.

Tichy realizes his only course of action and tackles Symington, pushing them both out of the window. They plummet to the earth, but instead of colliding with the frozen ground, Tichy splashes into the black, stinking waters of the sewer beneath the Costa Rica Hilton, revealing that his suspicions were right all along: the whole future world he experienced was an illusion. He realizes that it is now the second day of the Eighth World Futurological Congress.

== Cultural influence ==
Director Andrzej Wajda wished to adapt the novel into a film, but failed to obtain funding for his project.

Ari Folman's film The Congress is partially based on the novel Futurological Congress. Like Ijon Tichy, the female protagonist is split between delusional and real mental states. The film follows the same general narrative thread but focuses on the struggles of an actress with future technology.

The title of the book was used for one episode of the German TV show Ijon Tichy: Raumpilot, which itself was rather based on the story "The Eighth Voyage" from Lem's The Star Diaries.

== Notes ==
Lem sets the story in a fictional republic of Kostarykana (Costarikana; Costa Rica is called Kostaryka in Polish). In most foreign translations, except the English one by Michael Kandel, the name is rendered as "Costaricana", thus retaining its fictional reference.
