= Peace on Earth (novel) =

1985 novel by Stanisław Lem

- First English edition
- Author: Stanislaw Lem
- Original title: Pokój na Ziemi
- Translator: Elinor Ford with Michael Kandel
- Language: English
- Genre: Science fiction
- Publisher: Harcourt Brace
- English publication date: 1994
- Pages: 234
- ISBN: 0-15-171554-8

Peace on Earth (Polish: Pokój na Ziemi [ˈpɔkuj na ˈʑɛmʲi]) is a 1985 science fiction novel by Polish writer Stanisław Lem. The novel describes, in a satirical tone, the ultimate implications of the arms race. It is a continuation of the adventures of Ijon Tichy.

== Plot summary ==
The evolution of artificial intelligence has allowed major world powers to sign a rather curious treaty: the Moon is divided into national zones (proportional to each nation's Earth real estate) and all weapons development and production must be moved there to be handled by factories. This is supposed to completely demilitarize Earth, achieving the long-sought dream of world peace. A MAD stabilizing factor is apparently preserved by the ability of countries, in case of war, to quickly ship weapons down from the Moon.

Unknown to most people, a problem arises. The ever-increasing amount of autonomy given to Moon's automata, in order to conduct more-effective espionage in neighbors' nation facilities and also to defend one's own, leads to localized robotic conflicts on the Moon's surface. Eventually, after a number of events, there is a total discontinuation of any communication with the Moon. After a number of failed expeditions to reveal the truth on what is going on beneath the Moon's surface, Ijon Tichy is called to the rescue.

Right before the return he was hit by a laser weapon which has led to his callosotomy. The resulting split personality leads to his inability to communicate properly both with the people and between the two "alter egos". This results in a good deal of slapstick comedy, e.g., involving hilarious conflicts between Tichy's left and right hand or leg. With the help of his friend, professor Tarantoga, he eventually succeeds in talking to himself.

Another consequence of Tichy's visit is that he accidentally brings to the Earth particles of mysterious Moon dust, which turns out to be the result of military-robotic "necroevolution", described in Lem's novel The Invincible and which brings a quiet devastation of the whole Earth's technological infrastructure and information stored in it.

== Commentary ==
The title of the novel is borrowed from the title Pacem in terris encyclical issued by Pope John XXIII, and Orliński suggests that the plot was reflecting Lem's worries about the contemporary political situation. However Lem himself wrote that contrary the impression, the intention of the book was not political fiction, but it was an attempt to envision a situation when two independent consciousnesses evolve in one brain. He explained that to this end he undertook an extensive study of professional literature and as a result the background of this plot element was 80% scientific and 20% fictional invention.

Wojciech Orliński notes that the novel is a fabularization of the ideas put forth in the Library of the 21st Century, Lem's faux review of the (non-existing) book "Weapon Systems of The Twenty First Century or The Upside-down Evolution". In fact, in Chapter 2 Tichy reads this book.

Jerzy Jarzębski observes that the finale of the novel involving the destruction of information resembles the finales of several other Lem's novels: Professor A. Dońda, The Invincible, and Memoirs Found in a Bathtub.

== Publication history: first prints ==
Finished in 1984, it was first published in Sweden in 1985 under the title Fred på jorden by Brombergs, translated by Martin von Zweigbergk, ISBN 91-7608-270-9

In 1986, Hubert Schumann's German translation was published simultaneously in East Germany as Der Flop by Volk und Welt, ISBN 3353000186. and in West Germany as Frieden auf Erden by Insel Verlag, ISBN 3-458-14510-9.

The first edition in Poland by Wydawnictwo Literackie was in 1987, ISBN 83-08-01605-7

The first Russian translation (Мир на Земле) was published in the literary magazine Звезда Востока (Star of the East) in Uzbek SSR in 1988, issues 9 and 10, translated by И. Левшин and К. Душенко. In book form it was published in the collection Операция «Вечность» [Operation "Eternity"], Mir Publishers, ISBN 5-03-001177-3, pp. 19–272 ISBN 83-08-01605-7 translated by Е. Вайсброт.

It was translated into English in 1994.
