= Signal from Space (disambiguation) =

Signal from Space is the original name of the graphic novel Life on Another Planet, originally serialized in 1978–1980.

Signal from Space may also refer to:

- Signal from Space, a 2009 album by the Russian rock band Splean
- Message from Space (disambiguation)
