= List of fictional military robots =

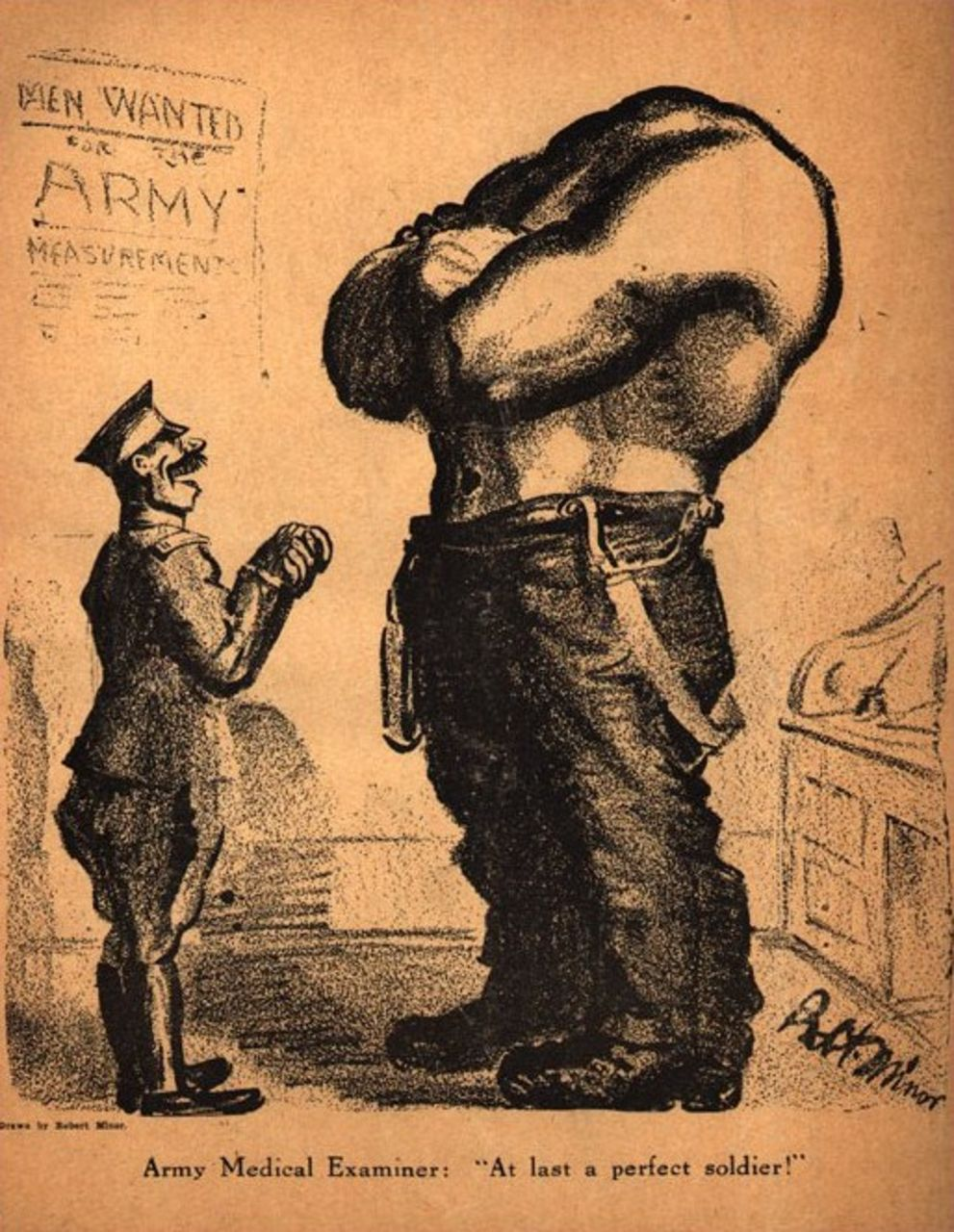
At Last a Perfect Soldier by Robert Minor, first published in The Masses in 1916.

Contemporary discourse about the ethical implications of military robots has been shaped by their portrayal in science fiction. In particular, Isaac Asimov's "Three Laws of Robotics", which set forth basic premises about human-robot relationships in his fictional universe, significantly influenced other science fiction writers and helped to establish many of them as experts taken seriously by military policy makers.

The following is a list of fictional works with military robots.

== Film ==
=== Near future ===
==== Land design ====
- Kill Command (2016) – S.A.R
- Fahrenheit 451 (1953) – Mechanical hound
- Red Planet (2000) – AMEE (Autonomous Mapping Exploration and Evasion)
- Lara Croft: Tomb Raider (2001) – S.I.M.O.N.
- RoboCop (1987) – ED-209 (Enforcement Droid Series 209)
- Terminator 3: Rise of the Machines (2003) – T-1 Battlefield Robot
- Short Circuit (1986) – Nova S-A-I-N-T (Strategic-Artificially-Intelligent-Nuclear-Transport) "Johnny 5"
- Hardware (1990) – M.A.R.K. 13 prototype killer combat droid

==== Air Models ====
- Stealth (2005) – EDI (Extreme Deep Invader)
- Terminator 3: Rise of the Machines (2003) – T-1 airborne VTOL craft

==== Land and Air Models ====
- Godzilla
  - Mechagodzilla
    - Mechagodzilla 1 - Extraterrestrial military robot
    - Mechagodzilla 2 - Man-made military robot
    - Kiryu or Mechagodzilla 3 - Man-made military robot
    - Mechagodzilla (Monsterverse version) - Man-made corporate military robot
  - M.O.G.U.E.R.A.
  - Mecha-King Ghidorah

=== High futurist ===
==== Humanoids ====
- Terminator series (1984/1991/2003) – Cyberdyne T-800/T-850 Terminator Endoskeleton
- Star Wars Episodes I, II, III (1999/2002/2005) – Eos B-1 Battle Droid
- Star Wars Episodes II, III (2002/2005) – Eos B-2 Super Battle Droid
- Star Wars Episode III (2005) – Holowan IG-100 MagnaGuards
- Transformers (2007) – Decepticons
- Saturn 3 (1980) – "Hector" Model
- The Black Hole (1979) – S.T.A.R. (Special Troops/Arms Regiment)
- Battlestar Galactica (1978) – Cylon Centurion (Military androids with silver armor)
- Fallout (series) (1997-present) – Protectron (General purpose robot, police variant available), Liberty Prime (Giant military robot), Synth (Generation 1 and 2), Assaultron
- Aliens (1986) – (Aliens) Lance Bishop Hyperdyne Systems model 341-B Synthetic

==== Androids ====
- Terminator series (1984/1991/2003) – Cyberdyne T-800 (Series 800, Model 101, Version 2.4)
- Terminator 2: Judgment Day – Cyberdyne T-1000 a shape-shifter android assassin
- Terminator 3: Rise of the Machines (2003) – T-X "Terminatrix"
- Fallout (series) (2016-present) – Synth (Generation 3, which is a nearly perfect replica of the human body)

==== Other designs ====
- The Matrix series (1999/2003) – Sentinels
- Lost in Space (1998) – B9 "Robot"
- Star Wars Episodes I, II, III (1999/2002/2005) – Droideka (Destroyer Droid)
- Star Wars series (1977/2005) – R2-D2 (Astromech droid)
- The Black Hole (1979) – V.I.N.CENT (Vital Information Necessary CENTralized)
- The Black Hole (1979) – B.O.B. (BiO-sanitation Battalion)
- The Black Hole (1979) – Maximilian
- Fallout series (1997–present) – Mister Gutsy, Robobrains (Controlled by an organic brain), Securitron, Sentry Bot, Liberator
- Halo 1, 2, and 3 (2001–2007) – Sentinels, and Super Sentinels
- Screamers (1995) – Screamers - Autonomous Mobile Sword (AMS) as Types 1, 2, 3 and 4

==== Powered Exoskeletons ====
- The Matrix Revolutions (2003) – APU (Armored Personnel Unit)
- Iron Man (2008) – Iron Man Suit (Powered exoskeleton)
- Avatar (2009 film) (2009) – AMP (Amplified Mobility Platform)
- M.A.N.T.I.S. (1994) – M.A.N.T.I.S. (Mechanically Augmented Neuro-Transmitter Interactive System)
- District 9 (2009) – Bio-Suit (Bio-mechanical powered exoskeleton)
- Fallout series (1997–present) – Various Models

== Television ==
- Battlestar Galactica
- Buck Rogers
- Murder Drones
- Robotica
- 24
- Stargate SG-1
- Stargate Atlantis
- Terminator: The Sarah Connor Chronicles
- Doctor Who (List of Doctor Who robots)

== Literature ==
- Various books by Isaac Asimov
- Shooting War by Anthony Lappé
- The Bolo stories of Keith Laumer and others.
- Starship Troopers by Robert A. Heinlein
- Various Dale Brown books
  - The Cybernetic Infantry Device manned robot and Tin Man robotic battle armor.
- "Malak" by Peter Watts
- Second Variety by Philip K. Dick
- The 1964 novel The Invincible by Polish writer Stanisław Lem described the ultimate evolution of military robots: swarms of minuscule, insect-like micromachines which defeat any "intelligent" machinery. This idea of an "ultimate weapon system" was finalized by Lem in his fictitious review "Weapon Systems of the Twenty First Century or The Upside-down Evolution".

== Computer/video games ==
- A.I. Wars (The Insect Mind) and (Armor Commander)
- Apex Legends
- Armed and Dangerous
- Battletech
- BioShock (series)
- Call of Duty: Black Ops II
- Call of Duty: Black Ops III
- Call of Duty: Infinite Warfare
- Command & Conquer 3: Tiberium Wars
- Command & Conquer: Generals and Command & Conquer: Generals – Zero Hour
- Command & Conquer: Red Alert 2 and Command & Conquer: Yuri's Revenge
- Cyberpunk 2077
- Command & Conquer: Red Alert 3
- Deus Ex and Deus Ex: Invisible War
- Earthsiege 2
- Empire Earth
- Empire Earth II
- Fallout (series)
- Generation Zero (video game)
- Genshin Impact
- Girls' Frontline
- Helldivers and Helldivers 2
- Honkai Series
- Horizon (series)
- Mega Man franchise
- Messiah
- Metal Gear
- Overwatch
- Portal
- Punishing: Gray Raven
- Ratchet & Clank
- Sonic the Hedgehog
- StarCraft
- Starsiege
- Supreme Commander
- Tiny Tank
- Titanfall and Titanfall 2
- Team Fortress 2
- Terraria
- Tower of Fantasy
- Trails (series)
- Ultrakill
- Unreal Tournament and Unreal Tournament 2004
- Wuthering Waves
- Z
- Zenless Zone Zero
