= Science Fiction and Futurology =

Book by Stanisław Lem

First edition

Science Fiction and Futurology (Polish: Fantastyka i futurologia) is a monograph of Stanisław Lem about science fiction and futurology, first printed by Wydawnictwo Literackie in 1970.

The official Lem website describes the book as a triple feature: an attempt to create a theory of the genre, a self-interpretation of Lem's own works, and a review of the world's science fiction, "a yet another Lem's General Theory of Everything - everything related to science fiction and its role in human knowledge acquisition".

In the book, Lem reviews and classifies works of over 400 science fiction writers.

The book was acutely critical of Western science fiction. As Lem wrote, "SF became a vulgar mythology of a technological civilization.... This monograph is an expression of my personal utopia, my longing for better SF, the one that should be." In the 1972 edition the criticism was somewhat softened, in particular, in the judgement of the works of Philip K. Dick. Lem confessed that his opinion about Philip K. Dick was based on limited knowledge of his works, not the best ones.

== Contents ==
(Omitting forewords and afterwords)

=== Volume 1. Structures ===
I. The language of a literary work
II. The world of a literary work (chapter changed since the second edition of 1972)
III. Structures of literary creation
IV. From structuralism to traditional criticism
V. Sociology of science fiction

=== Volume 2. Problem Fields of Science Fiction ===
I. Catastrophe
II. Robots and people
III. Outer space and science fiction
IV. Metaphysics of science fiction and futurology of faith
V. Erotics and sex
VI. Man and superman
VII. Remanent

Lem writes that before starting with the two last huge subjects of the book, he would like to briefly dwell upon a large number of topics not covered in the book. Some of them, such as horror in science fiction and space opera, are only mentioned in passing. The section analyzes some motives of "biological" science fiction, the ones, in Lem's opinion, having gnoseological value, only briefly reviewing the subject of fictional mutants of various types, ranging from post-apocalyptic to experiments of mad scientists.

VIII. Experiment in science fiction. From Bradbury to "New Wave"
IX. Utopia and futurology
