= Andrzej Zimniak =

Polish chemist and writer

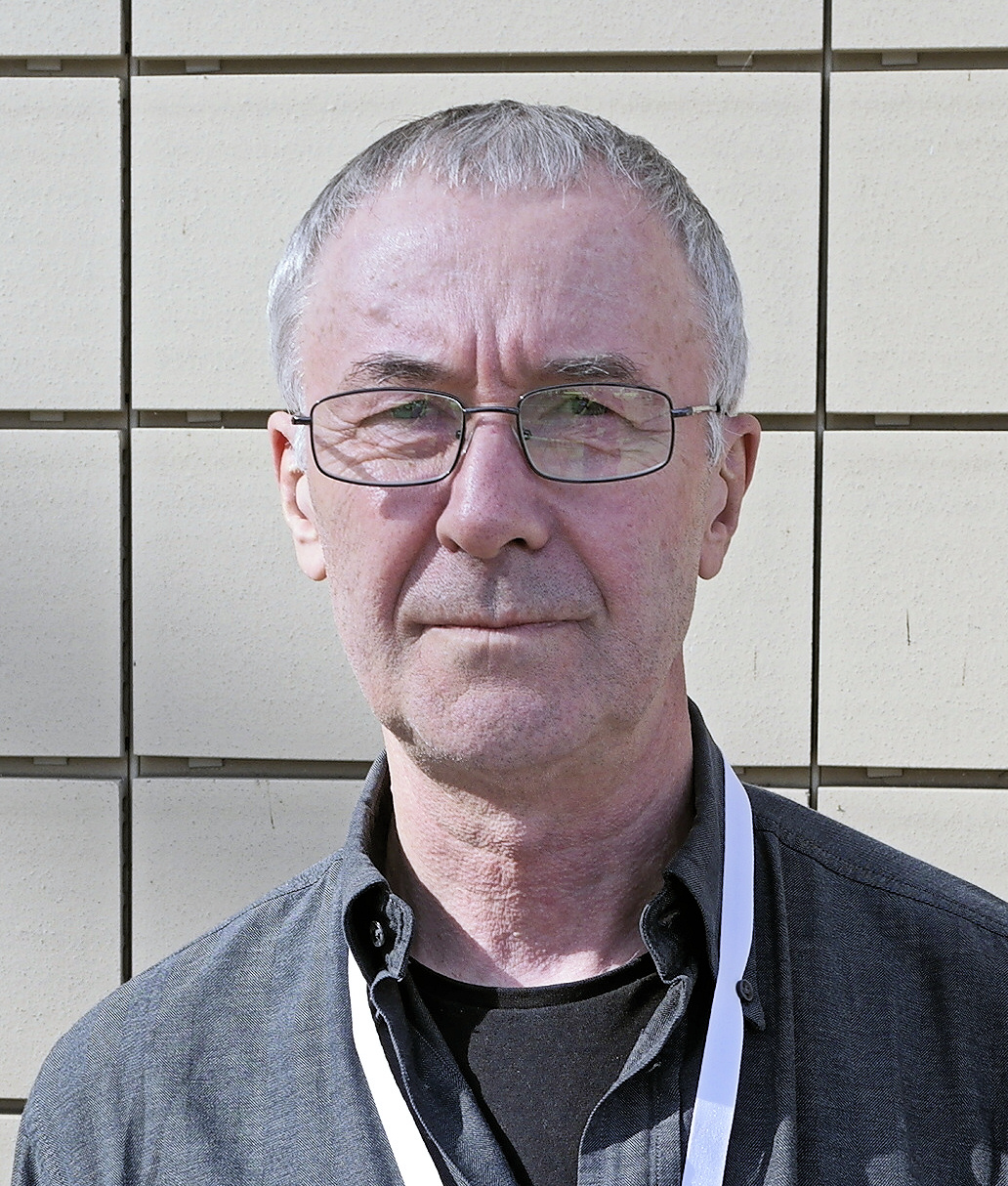
- Born: 3 October 1946 (age 79); Warsaw, Poland
- Citizenship: Polish
- Occupations: chemist, science fiction writer
- Writing career
- Genre: science fiction
- Website: zimniak.art.pl

Andrzej Zimniak (3 October 1946) is a Polish chemist and science fiction writer. He has published two novels and eight short story collections.

His short story "A Cage Full of Angels" has been published in the anthology A Polish Book of Monsters (2011, translated by Michael Kandel). This story was nominated for the Janusz A. Zajdel Award in 1994.

His prose has been called "difficult to classify" and centered on the question of subjectivity.

He is the initiator of the Jerzy Żuławski Literary Award (Polish: Nagroda Literacka im. Jerzego Żuławskiego), established in 2008.

== Bibliography ==
- Szlaki istnienia (Nasza Księgarnia, 1984, 13 short stories)
- Homo determinatus (Wydawnictwo Poznańskie, 1986, 5 short stories)
- Opus na trzy pociski (Iskry, 1988, 7 short stories)
- Spotkanie z wiecznością (Nasza Księgarnia, 1989, 6 short stories)
- Marcjanna i aniołowie (Wydawnictwo Poznańskie, 1989, novel)
- Samotny myśliwy (Alfa, 1994, 19 short stories)
- Klatka pełna aniołów (Prószyński i S-ka, 1999, 8 short stories)
- Łowcy meteorów (Sorus, 2000, 6 short stories)
- Śmierć ma zapach szkarłatu (Fabryka Słów, 2003, 12 short stories)
- Biały rój (Wydawnictwo Literackie, 2007, novel)
- Jak NIE zginie ludzkość. Prognozy naukowca i wizjonera. (Solaris, 2008, essays)

His short stories has also been published in various literary magazines and anthologies.
