= Prosyntexis =

Prosyntexis Temporal range: Barremian–Campanian

Scientific classification
- Domain: Eukaryota
- Kingdom: Animalia
- Phylum: Arthropoda
- Class: Insecta
- Order: Hymenoptera
- Family: †Sepulcidae
- Subfamily: †Trematothoracinae
- Genus: †Prosyntexis; Sharkey, 1990

Extinct genus of sawflies

Prosyntexis is an extinct genus of stem sawflies in the family Sepulcidae. There are at least four described species in Prosyntexis.

The species Prosyntexis okhotensis and Prosyntexis gobiensis were formerly included in the genus Trematothorax.

== Species ==
These four species belong to the genus Prosyntexis:

- † Prosyntexis gobiensis (Rasnitsyn, 1993) -Dzun-Bain Formation, Aptian
- † Prosyntexis gouleti Sharkey, 1990 - Crato Formation, Aptian
- † Prosyntexis montsecensis Rasnitsyn & Ansorge, 2000 La Pedrera de Rúbies Formation, Barremian
- † Prosyntexis okhotensis (Rasnitsyn, 1993) - Ola Formation, Campanian
