= Kristofer Pister =

American academic and businessman

Kristofer Pister

Kristofer S. J. Pister ("Kris Pister") is a professor of electrical engineering and computer sciences at University of California, Berkeley and the founder and CTO of Dust Networks. He is known for his academic work on Microelectromechanical systems (MEMS), their simulation (the SUGAR MEMS simulator), his work on Smartdust, and his membership in the JASON Defense Advisory Group. He is the son of former Berkeley Dean of Engineering and former UC Chancellor Karl Pister.

== Professional work ==
Kristofer Pister is a professor at the University of California, Berkeley, where he has taught since 1997. Prior to that he was a professor at the University of California Los Angeles. He is generally attributed as the inventor and key implementer of smartdust, and is the founder and current CTO of Dust Networks, a company commercializing the smart dust concept. Dust Networks was then bought by Linear but still kept its original name (Dust Networks).

Pister initially focused on microelectromechanical systems and has since shifted his lab focus toward integrated circuits. Many of his innovations have been at the intersection of the two. Kris successfully commercialized or licensed micromachine technologies with Tanner Research, OMM Inc., Xactix, and Sony. He is also the originator of the fold up silicon quick reference macro-crystal.

== Education ==
He holds a PhD and MS in electrical engineering and computer sciences from UC Berkeley and a BS from UC San Diego.
