= Tomasz Kołodziejczak =

Polish writer, screenwriter, publisher and editor

Tomasz Kolodziejczak

Tomasz Kołodziejczak (born 13 October 1967) is a Polish science fiction and fantasy writer, screenwriter, publisher and editor of books, comics and role-playing games.

He made his debut in 1985 with the short story Kukiełki (Rag Dolls) in Przegląd Techniczny. He has published several novels: Wybierz swoją śmierć (Choose Your Own Death), Krew i Kamień (Blood and the Stone), Kolory sztandarów (The Colours of the Banners), and Schwytany w światła (Caught in the Lights), as well as the short-story collections Wrócę do ciebie, kacie (I’ll Come Back to You, Hangman), Przygody rycerza Darlana (The Adventures of Darlan the Knight); and a game, Rzeźbiarze Pierścieni (Sculptors of the Rings).

He has been nominated eight times for the Janusz A. Zajdel Award (last time in 2014), and received it in 1996 for the novel Kolory sztandarów. In 2008 he published a graphic novel for children, Darlan i Horwazy – Złoty Kur (Darlan and Horwazy: The Golden Hen), with art by Krzysztof Kopeć. He wrote comic scenarios for Uncle Srooge short story "Something for nothing" (Disney) and Batman short story "The procteor of the city" (DC) and also short stories for known Polish comic artist. He is a three-time winner of the Śląkfa Award (for both publishing and fan activity) and winner of the Papcio Chmiel Award for his services to Polish comics. His novels and short stories have been translated into Czech, English, Lithuanian, Hungarian and Russian. He is the author of reviews, essays and literary features, editor of two magazines, Voyager and Magia i Miecz, compiler of anthologies, and presenter of programs about popular culture on television and radio. He is a member of the literary group Klub Tfurców. From 1995 to 2023 he was a publisher of comics and board games at the publishing house Egmont Poland.

He designed a role playing game Strefa śmierci (Death Zone) in the 1990s. He was also a script writer for the video game Schizm: Mysterious Journey (2001).

== Works ==
- 1990 Wybierz swoją śmierć - science fiction novel
- 1994 Krew i kamień - fantasy novel
- 1995 Wrócę do ciebie kacie - science fiction short stories collection
- 1996 Kolory Sztandarów - science fiction novel
- 1996 Rzeźbiarze Pierścieni - gamebook
- 1997 Przygody rycerza Darlana- fantasy children novel
- 1999 Schwytany w światła - science fiction novel
- 2009 Złoty kur - fantasy children comic
- 2010 Czarny Horyzont - fantasy novel
- 2011 Głowobójcy - science fiction short stories collection
- 2012 Czerwona Mgła - fantasy short stories collection
- 2014 Biała Reduta, vol. 1 - fantasy novel
- 2015 Wstań i idź - science fiction short stories collection
- 2018 Białe źrenice - poetry
- 2021 Skaza na niebie - science fiction short stories collection

== Translations into English ==
- 2000: Excerpts of his novel Kolory sztandarów (1996) have been translated to English by Małgorzata Wilk as “The Colours of the Banners” in the Chosen by Fate: Zajdel Award Winners Anthology (2000).
- 2010: "Klucz przejścia" (originally published in 2002 in magazine Click), in A Polish Book of Monsters (2010), edited and translated by Michael Kandel (as "Key of Passage"). New York: PIASA Books.

== Awards ==
- 2013: Gold Cross of Merit
- 2010: Badge of Merit to Culture
- 1996: Janusz A. Zajdel Award
- 1991, 1995, 2002, 2022: Śląkfa Award
