= A Polish Book of Monsters =

2010 speculative fiction anthology

- Cover of the book
- Editor: Michael Kandel
- Language: English
- Genre: Speculative fiction
- Publisher: PIASA Books
- Publication date: 2010
- Publication place: United States
- Media type: Anthology
- Pages: 298
- ISBN: 9780940962705
- OCLC: 691204202
- LC Class: 2010050583

A Polish Book of Monsters: Five Dark Tales from Contemporary Poland is an anthology of Polish speculative fiction, published by PIASA Books in 2010. The five stories it collects have all been translated by Michael Kandel, who is also the editor for the volume.

== Contents ==
The book contains an introduction by Michael Kandel, and five stories.

- Marek S. Huberath, "Yoo Retoont, Sneogg. Ay Noo" (trans. of "Wrócieeś Sneogg, wiedziaam ...", 1987). Huberath's debut. Set in a post-apocalyptic context, it portrays a dark future in which survivors practice eugenics on mutant children, raising them in labs and culling those with mental and physical defects for their organs. The protagonist, Snogg, selected as a successful specimen, returns to rescue his doomed friends. Rejecting his status, he argues that those being culled are also true human beings, not deserving to be discarded.
- Andrzej Sapkowski, "Spellmaker" (trans. of "Wiedźmin", 1986). Sapkowski's debut, and the first story in The Witcher universe. The story features the titular character, Geralt of Rivia, tackling a curse that transformed a princess into a monster known as strzyga (the gomb, in Kandel's translation).
- Tomasz Kołodziejczak, "Key of Passage" (trans. of "Klucz przejścia", 2002). The story is set in a world where another reality intertwines with that of modern Central and Eastern Europe, and portrays a future Poland in which humans have to contend with fantasy races such as elves, and more menacing and nightmarish balrogs, jaegers, and trolls.
- Andrzej Zimniak, "A Cage Full of Angels" (trans. of "Klatka pełna aniołów", 1999). The story features a rogue and unscrupulous adventurer, Enkel, who has psychic abilities capable of absorbing the powers of others.
- Jacek Dukaj, "The Iron General" (trans. of "Ruch Generała", 2000). The story describes a universe in which technology and magic co-exist, and political and cultural turmoil threatens a war. The titular Iron General is the story's protagonist – a national hero and political leader who is almost a thousand years old, who is faced with a new threat – that of modernity.

The volume contains a number of debuts. Sapkowski's story was his first story written; while Huberath's story is both his debut in Polish and also his first work translated to English.

== Reception and analysis ==
=== Reviews ===
The book was reviewed by Łukasz Wodzyński for The Cosmopolitan Review. He called it as "a modest but commendable attempt to introduce some of the most interesting samples of Polish fantasy and science fiction to English-speaking audiences". Outside the odd choices in the translation of Sapkowski's story, he described Kandel's translation as solid. In conclusion, Wodzyński saw the volume as "certainly worth the time and effort", with only minor issues, although he noted that the volume name is somewhat misleading, as it calls itself an overview of contemporary Polish literature, yet published in 2010 it contains three stories that are a decade old, and two that are over two decades old.

The quality of the translation has been praised as "superb" in the Polish-American polishnews.com portal, whose reviewer wrote that stories in the volume "show us that the line between good and evil, between human and monstrous, can be perilously thin". The reviewer concluded that "Fans of speculative fiction will enjoy the mix in this volume... General readers as well as those interested in Polish and Slavic literature will find these "dark tales" strangely illuminating".

Michael Little reviewed the book for The Polish Review. He noted that the work, which he praised as a "wonderful collection" with insights about our culture, literature and ourselves, serves to demonstrate to English readers that Polish science fiction is more than just Stanisław Lem. Katarzyna Zechenter from University College London, who reviewed the book for Canadian Slavonic Papers, wrote that the stories presented here follow in the tradition of Stanisław Lem. She classifies the works in the volume as mostly science fiction, containing some expected elements of Polish and Slavic folklore, and echoing Little, she wrote that it offers "a fascinating glimpse into the realm of Polish science fiction beyond the works of Lem".

Michael Froggatt reviewed the book for Slavonica. He sees the stories in the volume as well translated and enjoyable, varying in quality, but overall succeeding in "present[ing] an intriguing cross-section of fantasy writing in Poland over the last twenty-five years." Kirsten Lodge writing for the Slavic and East European Journal saw all stories herein as sharing "visionary fancy and a pessimistic tone" as well as "a fascination with various different worlds and beings, war and post-war devastation, and memory and forgetting". Commenting on translation quality, she wrote that Kandel "admirably capture the style of the originals, though he often lengthens or shortens sentences, and at times his word choices seem a bit odd".

Helena Goscilo, Professor of Slavic and East European Languages and Literatures at Ohio State University, positively commented on the translation and the stories. The latter she described as exploring "universal issues in a quintessentially Polish mode" and praised as "sophisticated tales" offering "a gripping read" in the best tradition of Stanisław Lem and Philip K. Dick. The stories and translation have also been positively reviewed by Christopher Caes (then at University of Florida) and Sibelan Forrester, Professor of Modern and Classical Language from Swarthmore College. Caes described the volume as containing "the best work in Polish fantastic fiction from the past couple of decades", and Forrester, as "striking and memorable".

The book received a short review in World Literature Today, where the reviewer noted that each story has its own "distinctive voice [and] predicts a sinister future". It has also been mentioned in the book Out of This World: Speculative Fiction in Translation from the Cold War to the New Millennium where Rachel S. Cordasco noted that the volume "demonstrates the richness of Polish fantastyka".

==== Huberath: "Yoo Retoont, Sneogg. Ay Noo" ====
Froggatt considers Huberath's story the strongest in the volume, which he regards a stand-out dystopia that focuses on intimately telling the story from the point of view of its victims; writing that "the dull horror of the setting is only compounded by the stark, sterile prose adopted to describe it". Little described it as "the only straight science fiction offering" in the volume, whose plot focuses on "an ill-fated personal rebellion that raises questions about the conflict between individual and corporate ethics [and] the value of the individual against the need of society". He noted that the setting is somewhat forced, but the authors questions "bear consideration and reject easy answers". Wodzyński called the story an "intelligent and beautiful tale [that] is a definite highlight of this collection". Lodge saw the work as tackling "the major themes of distinct spaces within a ruined world, which has forgotten the past". Cordasco wrote that Huberath's story "explores what it means to be human".

==== Sapkowski: "Spellmaker" ====
Regarding Sapkowski's story, Wodzyński wrote that "The story highlights the best qualities of Sapkowski's writing: intertextual playfulness (especially with respect to his source material), wit and humour" and that it is "A great example of what a talented author can do with even the simplest fairy tale model". Little saw Sapkowski's work as the most fantasy-like story in the volume, whose theme is "the psychic and social costs incurred by those who devote themselves to facing what others cannot or will not ... need but not wanted". Froggatt described that story simply as "a relatively straightforward adventure".

Several reviewers and scholars addressed the translation of this story (particularly as it has already been translated to English before, and Kandel controversially chose to render many terms differently). Wodzyński considered Kandel's choice to translate established terms as unfortunate, confusing, and "descriptively inaccurate", distancing the work from its Slavic spirit. For example, he negatively opined on the fact that Kandel not only rendered "witcher" as "spellmaker", and strzyga as "the gomb", but even changed placenames like Velerad, Wizima, Mahakam, and Foltest to "Ethmond, Klothstur, Apiph, and Hrobost". The translation was also the focus of Hannah Salich's chapter in the Translatio y Cultura book. She sees Kandel's translation as taking more of a liberty with the source material. She notes that this has been discussed and not always appreciated by readers, but argues that Kandel's choice can be seen as reflecting the multicultural aspect of the Sapkowski's universe, while still retaining some aspects of the Slavic culture (by transferring or inventing Slavic sounding names). Paulina Drewnik in a chapter in the Wiedźmin – polski fenomen popkultury book briefly addressed the issue of the translation of the story, noting that Kandel's intention was to ignore what he considered a "game-style" translation, and promote Polish culture instead. Kandel's translation was also praised by Dorota Guttfeld, who noted that it is well executed and relaxed, intended to emphasize "the humorous effect", and that it was created in 2007 (and bundled with the first video game in the Witcher series), before Sapkowski's universe became well known among the English audience. She nonetheless notes that Kandel was inconsistent, as he translated some names differently in different part of the story (for example, the town of Novigrad is rendered as Kloffok in one place, and as Globbur, in another).

==== Kołodziejczak: "Key of Passage" ====
Froggatt saw in the story "evocative imagery [that] succeeds in creating a pervasive sense of dread, clearly rooted in Poland's experience of wartime occupation by the Soviet Union and the Third Reich". Little praised the appealing "complex universe" the story hints at, and saw the story a traditional tale of "small human dramas" shown in the backdrop of wider "enormous and pitiless forces"; he praised the author for "deftly balancing despair and hope". Lodge saw the vision of devastated and occupied Europe in the story as a reference to Poland's troubled history in the 20th century. Wodzyński on the other hand was less impressed by the story, which he saw as not among the author's best, and described it as "a standard spy thriller with some occasional horror elements and a few amusing touches".

==== Zimniak: "A Cage Full of Angels" ====
Little described Zimniak's story as "brutish" and "the roughest" in the volume. Its protagonist lives by the motto of "might makes right", and he believes that the author's intention was to ask the reader to "articulate arguments against his worldview" or witness the alternative, as portrayed in the story. Zechenter saw the protagonist, Enkel, as inspired by Till Eulenspiegel, a ruthless person who nonetheless follows his own code of morality. Wodzyński was not very impressed with this story, which for him had "disappointingly little substance". Likewise, Froggatt described it as rather forgettable, and described its titular character as a "nihilistic, parasitical vampire".

==== Dukaj: "The Iron General" ====
Wodzyński praised Dukaj's story, calling it "a true exercise in the power of imagination", posing numerous "very important questions with respect to the theme of monstrosity". Froggatt noted that the description of sorcery in the terminology of computer programming is reminiscent of Clarke's Third Law ("Any sufficiently advanced technology is indistinguishable from magic"). Zechenter saw the work as a "dissection of the concept of a national hero across a multiplicity of worlds". For Little, the central theme of the story was a "profound question of 'What makes us who we are'"? According to Little, the story tackles the philosophical question regarding whether it is our human bodies, or something else, that forms our essence, a question that Dukaj "couples with the bleak suggestion that it's not our bodies that make us human, but rather our self-absorption, self-interest and ambition". For Cordasco, the story is an exploration of "the concept of the monstrous" in an unsusal, fantastical universe.

=== The monster theme ===
Several reviewers commented on the titular concept of the anthology (that of the monster) which Kandel also addresses in his introduction to the volume.

Froggatt references Kandel's introduction in this volume that "The Polish monster is a far more ambivalent creature" than those traditionally portrayed by Western writers, whose "core purpose remains 'to make us gasp and scream'", and so the line between humans and monsters presented in this volume is rather thinner than the title would suggest. He summarized Kandel's view as "the 'American' monster is them, while the Polish monster is us", although he is not convinced by it. Other reviewers were more inclined to agree with Kandel. Zechenter observed that the motif unifying the work presented here "is identifiably Polish in the sense that it presents the monster condition as something that is actually not far removed from humanity and goodness, or even as the obverse of humanity". Little found Kandel's discussion of the differences of the concepts of monsters in Poland and American media useful, noting that according to Kandel, American monsters are generally portrayed as fearful enemies whose defeat reaffirms our humanity, whereas Polish ones blur the boundary between humans and monsters. He did however criticize Kandel's choice of examples, noting that effectively he seems to compare Polish literature to American cinema, rather than to American literature.

Wodzyński observed that the topic of monsters in popular culture had recently become increasingly debated by literary scholars and critics, and as such, the translation of Polish works with that theme was timely.

== Awards ==
Kandel received a nomination in the 2012 (Note: The 2012 awards were described as given "for works published in 2011", although Kandel's work was published in 2010.) Science Fiction & Fantasy Translation Awards in the Short Story category for his translation of Sapkowski's "Spellmaker" story in this volume.
