= The Chain of Chance =

1976 detective novel by Stanislaw Lem

First edition (publ. Wydawnictwo Literackie) cover by Lech Przybylski

The Chain of Chance (original Polish title: Katar, literally, "Rhinitis"/Catarrh) is a science fiction/detective novel by the Polish writer Stanisław Lem, published in 1976. Lem's treatment of the detective genre introduces many nontraditional elements. The reader is prompted not only to consider various suspects as possible culprits in a series of murders, but also the possibility that "there's no such thing as a mysterious event" and they have all happened purely by chance (hence the English title). In this way, the natural laws of probability and chaos theory play the role of suspects and characters in a murder mystery, lending elements of science fiction to the novel. The underlying philosophical idea is expanded on by Lem in his major essay The Philosophy of Chance.

== Plot ==
A former astronaut is hired by a detective agency to help in an investigation of a case of mysterious deaths. Several victims became mad and committed suicide during their vacation in various Naples spas, apparently without reason. Due to certain similarities in the circumstances of the deaths and the profiles of the victims the case is assumed to be a serial murder by poisoning, although it is never certain what (if any) real connection exists between the victims.

During the investigation, it becomes apparent that certain innocent chemicals can be combined into a strong depressor, a kind of chemical weapon. The hero experiences its effects, but his training helps him to survive and solve the case. He discovers the industrial sources of the chemicals, and demonstrates how random chance chemical reactions led to the string of deaths.

== Comments ==
One of chemical compounds involved in the deadly mixture comes from an anti-allergic drug, which the hero takes for allergic rhinitis, hence the novel's original title.

Comparing to Lem's other mystery novel, The Investigation, Lem himself notes that the latter one is rather overstretched, while the story in Katar is more credible.

== Translations ==
In 1979 the novel (translated as Le Rhume in French) received the French literary prize Grand Prix de Littérature Policière in the International category.

In 1998 it was translated in Romanian as Catarul by Mihai Mitu and published by Editura Nemira.

In 2020 it was translated in Italian as Febbre da fieno translated by Lorenzo Pompeo,

== See also ==
- 1951 Pont-Saint-Esprit mass poisoning
- Psychochemical warfare
