= Lymphater's Formula =

"Lymphater's Formula" (Polish: "Formula Lymphatera") is a 1961 science fiction short story by Polish writer Stanisław Lem. It is a story of a "mad scientist", mathematician Ammon Lymphater, who invents an artificial intelligence, and then he realizes that it is capable of rendering the humankind obsolete.

It was first published in the 1961 collection Księga robotów (Book of Robots) with the pre-annotation "from the memoirs of Ijon Tichy". The story was never republished with this pre-annotation, and nothing in the novel gives any indication at Ijon Tichy. Piotr Krywak tried to figure out possible explanations for this, apart from a typographical error.

== Plot ==
Ammon Lymphater became interested in the emerging science of cybernetics and information theory, and started studying the works of an animal brain, the ant's brain in particular. He took note that the inherited knowledge is an evolutionary advantage somehow not exploited in full by the evolution. Eventually he came to a conclusion that only by pure biological restrictions that adaptive abilities of insects were stopped in their tracks by the evolution. He went on further wondering whether the ants have an ability to apriori knowledge, i.e., knowledge neither inherited nor learned. He decided to consult a famous myrmecologist, who told him about a rare ant species Acanthis Rubra Willinsoniana with an exceptionally high adaptability. Eventually Lymphater devised and constructed "It" capable of instant precognition of everything within "Its" rapidly expanding range of perception. From "It" Lymphater learns that the humanity is not the "crown of evolution", but rather evolution's tool to create "It", because the evolution could not create "It" directly (confirming Lymphater's reasoning about ants). Realizing that the Superentity "It" renders the human civilization redundant and obsolete, Lymphater destroys "It". "It" already knew Lymphater's intentions, but was not worried, knowing that sooner or later someone else will create "It" again and again. "It" was only the first variant of Lymphater's formula and the second variant is possible. Lyphater wonders whether the second one would be capable to create the third stage of the evolution which would amount to an artificial God.

== Publication history ==
It was translated in Russian (as "Формула Лимфатера") in 1963, in Hungarian (as "Lymphater utolsó képlete") in 1966, and in Bulgarian (as "Формулата на Лимфатер" by Георги Димитров Георгиев) in 1969. In 1973 an audiobook was released in German (as "Die lymphatersche Formel"), narrated by Martin Held.

It was also republished (and translated) in some other collections of Lem's short stories.
