= General theory of everything =

The General Theory of Everything (Polish: Ogólna Teoria Wszystkiego) is a sarcastic coinage of Stanisław Lem introduced in 1966. The biographical sketch of Ijon Tichy in "The Twenty-eighth Voyage" of Tychy's Star Diaries says that a grandfather of Ijon, Jeremiasz Tichy, "decided to create the General Theory of Everything, and nothing stopped him from doing this".

Apart from being a precursor of the term "Theory of Everything," the term GTE was used to characterize Lem's essays of fundamental character, such as The Philosophy of Chance and Science Fiction and Futurology, as well as the pseudoscientific work of Polish scifi writer Adam Wiśniewski-Snerg, Jednolita teoria czasoprzestrzeni ["The Uniform Theory of the Spacetime"] (1990)
