= The Invincible =

1964 novel by Stanisław Lem

- First edition (Polish)
- Author: Stanisław Lem
- Cover artist: Piotr Borowy
- Language: Polish
- Genre: Hard Science Fiction
- Publisher: Wydawnictwo MON (original); Seabury Press (English-language original edition); MIT Press (English-language revised edition)
- Publication date: 1963
- Publication place: Poland
- English publication date: 1973
- Media type: Print (Hardcover, Paperback)
- Pages: 316 pp (first edition, paperback)
- OCLC: 488362 (English-language edition)

The Invincible (Polish: Niezwyciężony) is a hard science fiction novel by Polish writer Stanisław Lem, serialized in Gazeta Białostocka in 1963 and published as a book in 1964. It was one of the first (Note: Earlier, a concept similar to nanotechnology, called "micromechanical devices", was described in Lem's 1959 novel Eden. See "Nanotechnology in fiction" for still earlier examples.) novels to explore the ideas of microrobots, smartdust, artificial swarm intelligence, and "necroevolution" (a term suggested by Lem in the novel for the evolution of non-living matter).

The Invincible originally appeared as the title story in Lem's collection Niezwyciężony i inne opowiadania ("The Invincible and Other Stories"). A translation into German was published in 1967; an English translation by Wendayne Ackerman, based on the German one, was published in 1973. A direct translation into English from Polish, by Bill Johnston, was published in 2006.

== Plot summary ==
A heavily armed interstellar spacecraft called Invincible lands on the planet Regis III, which seems uninhabited and bleak, to investigate the loss of her sister ship, Condor. During the investigation, the crew finds evidence of a form of quasi-life, born through evolution of autonomous, self-replicating machines, apparently left behind by an alien civilization ship which landed on Regis III a very long time earlier.

The protagonists come to speculate that a kind of evolution must have taken place under the selection pressures of "robot wars", with the only surviving forms being sessile machines that resemble bushes and swarms of minuscule, insect-like micromachines. Individually, or in small groups, the latter are quite harmless and capable of only very simple behavior. When threatened, they can assemble into huge clouds, travel at a high speed, and even climb to the top of the troposphere. These swarms display complex behavior arising from self-organization and can incapacitate any intelligent threat by a powerful surge of electromagnetic interference. Condor's crew suffered a complete memory erasure as a consequence of attacks from these "clouds". The swarm, however, is reactive. It lacks intelligence and cannot formulate attack strategies proactively.

Invincible's crew mounts an escalating series of attacks on the perceived enemy, but eventually recognizes the futility of their efforts. The robotic "fauna", dubbed "necrosphere", has become part of the planet's ecology, and would require a disruption on a planetary scale to be destroyed.

In the face of defeat and imminent withdrawal of the Invincible, Rohan, the spaceship's first navigator, undertakes a trip into the "enemy area" in search of four crew members who went missing in action – an attempt which he and the Invincible's commander Horpach see as certainly futile, but necessary for moral reasons. Rohan wanders into canyons covered by metallic "shrubs" and "insects", and finds some of the missing crewmen dead. He gathers some evidence and returns to the ship unharmed, thanks partially to a device that cloaks his brain activity and partially to his calm and nonthreatening behavior. Rohan expresses his intention to petition for preservation of the planet's artificial ecosystem, which fascinates him.

== Commentary ==
The novel turns into an analysis of the relationship between different life domains, and their place in the Universe. In particular, it is an imaginary experiment to demonstrate that evolution may not necessarily lead to dominance by intellectually superior life forms.

The plot also involves a philosophical dilemma, juxtaposing the values of humanity and the efficiency of mechanical insects. Jarzębski comments that the novel demonstrates that the advantage of humans is not in the ability to annihilate the enemy but in the "ability to stop", to overcome the Darwinian instinct of struggle for an advantage.

Theodore Sturgeon praised The Invincible as "SF in the grand tradition", saying "The science is hard. The descriptions are vivid and powerful."

The idea of an "ultimate weapon system" was finalized by Lem in his 1983/1986 fictitious review "Weapon Systems of the Twenty First Century or The Upside-down Evolution". The themes of microrobots and smart dust from his faux review were used verbatim in his 1985 novel Peace on Earth, where Ijon Tichy reads chapters from the (faux) book.

== Adaptations ==
- In the late 1960s, Michael Redstone acquired the rights to a film adaptation of the novel, but he failed to find producers. In his usual grumpy manner Lem commented that "it would probably have been awful, but I did earn a lot".
- In 1991, Swedish author Kerstin Ekman created an educational computer game titled Rymdresa, which is mainly based on The Invincible.
- In 2019, Rafał Mikołajczyk published the comic book Niezwyciężony [The Invincible], ISBN 9788395521409. Reviewers note the faithful rendering of Lem's original novel by Mikołajczyk in a different medium.
- In 2020, Polish video game developer Starward Industries announced a video game adaptation of The Invincible. According to the developer, the adaptation is designed for PC, PlayStation 5 and Xbox Series X/S consoles. The game was released on November 6, 2023.
