= Sepulka =

Fictional objects in Stanisław Lem works

Sepulkas (Polish: sepulki, singular sepulka) (also sepulcas or scrupts in English translation) are fictional objects mentioned in Stanisław Lem's books The Star Diaries and Observation on the Spot. The nature of these objects, their physical properties, and their use are mysterious.

== In-universe sepulkas ==
Sepulkas are first mentioned by Lem's interstellar traveller Ijon Tichy during his fourteenth voyage. Lem never explains what they are nor how they are used.

The Encyclopaedia Cosmica gives the following definitions:

- Sepulka – pl.: sepulki, a prominent element of the civilization of Ardrites from the planet of Enteropia; see "Sepulkaria"
- Sepulkaria – sing: sepulkarium, establishments used for sepuling; see "Sepuling"
- Sepuling (Polish: sepulenie) – an activity of Ardrites from the planet of Enteropia; see "Sepulka"

Puzzled by these circular definitions, Tichy decides to visit Enteropia and learn about sepulkas firsthand. There, he notices that hints to sepulkas are omnipresent in art, media, and commercials; however, any discussion about sepulkas is taboo and Tichy's attempts to learn about them are seen by the locals as faux pas. Eventually Tichy decides to purchase a sepulka. The salesman asks him where his wife is and Tichy admits that he is a bachelor, which leaves the salesman speechless. Another of Tichy's attempts ends even worse: he asks his friend about sepulkas in a pub. The friend's wife faints, other customers are shocked, and Tichy is thrown out of the pub.

In Observation on the Spot it is revealed that the planet Enteropia does not exist, being no more than camouflage for the planet Entia. It is further revealed that the entire Encyclopaedia Cosmica was a hoax — and therefore any speculations about the "pornosphericity" of sepulkas must be discounted. Tichy's friend, professor Tarantoga, knew this, but forgot to warn Tichy.

Lem's last work, the 2005 essay "Głosy z sieci" ("Voices from the Net"), contained answers to questions from Russian internet users to Lem. Two users wrote that since their childhood they had wondered what sepulkas were and what their "pornosphericity" was. Lem's answer was: "Well, I have no idea myself."

A comparison of two recent Russian biographies of Lem (written in 2014 and 2015) notes that neither biographer was able to clarify the nature of sepulkas.

In 1985, The Fourteenth Voyage of Tichy was rendered as a Russian-language animated film in the Soviet Union. Produced by Azerbaijanfilm, this 10-minute film was titled From the Diaries of Ijon Tichy. A Voyage to Enteropia (Russian: Из дневников Ийона Тихого. Путешествие на Интеропию). In the film, Tichy acquires a sepulka (an egg-shaped object), but when he tries to board his spaceship (piloted by professor Tarantoga), he is hit by a meteorite, the plague of Enteropia, and at that moment it is revealed that the purchased egg-shaped object stored Tichy's double, the standard remedy for meteorite kills on Enteropia.

In a 2009 interview with Gazeta Wyborcza Lem's son Tomasz said that Lem carefully watched that in the translations of his works the word "sepulka" had no associations with any word in the target language. Tomasz Lem also said that he at least knew one thing that a sepulka does not look like: a fan had once sent his father a painting of a sepulka, somewhat resembling a sailboat. Lem, disappointed, replied that the painting did not resemble a sepulka at all.

The FAQ at lem.pl claims that sepulkas resemble murkwie and pćmy łagodne, although their uses are completely different.

== Legacy ==
In 1983–1986, the Polish Union of Fans of Science Fiction (Polskie Stowarzyszenie Miłośników Fantastyki) issued the Golden Sepulka Award for works of science fiction. It was superseded by the Janusz A. Zajdel Award.

Sepulcidae is a family of extinct hymenopteran insects found in 1968 in Transbaikalia. It was identified by Alexandr Pavlovich Rasnitsyn and named by his colleague and science-fiction author Kirill Eskov.

In 1972 Russian paleontologist Nina Shevyryova (Нина Семёновна Шевырёва, 1931–1996) named an extinct rodent Sepulkomys eboretus. "Eboretus" is another bow to Lem: "eboret" is a type of public transport on the planet Enteropia visited by Tichy in his "Fourteenth Voyage".

In 2007 Wojciech Orliński published a book Co to są sepulki? Wszystko o Lemie ("What are Sepulkas? Everything about Lem").
