= Professor Tarantoga =

Fictional character

Professor Tarantoga (from the 1986 animated film "From the Diaries of Ijon Tichy. A Voyage to Interopia")

Professor Tarantoga (full name: Astral Sternu Tarantoga), an eccentric xenozoologist, traveller, and inventor, is a fictional character from science fiction works, mostly humorous, by Polish writer Stanislaw Lem.

Originally he appeared in The Star Diaries as a friend of the space traveler Ijon Tichy and later appeared in some other works of Lem. Russian literary critic Roman Arbitman describes Tarantoga as "a hybrid of mini-Sabaoth and mini-Frankenstein with good-heardedness of Doctor Aybolit and absent-mindedness of Paganel", who exploited Ijon Tichy to test his crazy ideas: what will happen if the time will be slowed down or will be made into a closed loop, etc.

In addition to secondary appearances, Tarantoga is the main character of four plays (published and broadcast by radio; some adapted for TV).

== Curriculum vitae ==
Tarantoga is professor of xenozoology at the University at Fomalhaut, chairman of the editorial committee for Ijon Tichy Opera Omnia ("Dzieła Wszystkie Ijona Tichego"), member of the Scientific Committee of the Institute of Tichology, inventor and creator of various devices (most of which being parodies of common science fiction tropes).

In the printed stories Tarantoga appears to be a humanoid. In the 1986 Azerbaijanfilm Russian-language animated TV film Из дневников Йона Тихого. Путешествие на Интеропию [From the Diaries of Ijon Tichy. A Voyage to Interopia] based on "The Fourteenth Voyage" he is a Fomalhautian, a nearly-humanoidal creature with antennae on the head, four upper arms and some lower ones hidden under the robe. In German TV series Ijon Tichy: Space Pilot he is a three-eyed and two-nosed humanoid who lost his arm during experiments with teleportation.

=== Inventions and other achievements ===
- Peregrinator (Polish: peregrynator), a device for space travel, the traveler does not move from a spot, but rather bends the space in 4th dimension (Wyprawa profesora Tarantogi animated film)
- A device to accelerate and slow down time (The Twelfth Voyage)
- A liquid for erasing bad memories (The Twelfth Voyage)
- A banknote with the infinity symbol ∞ denoting infinite value (The Twelfth Voyage)
- An apparatus for utilizing children's energy: a system of levers, dials, knobs, buttons, pulleys, etc., which are pushed/pulled/turned by children during their frolicking to produce electricity (The Twelfth Voyage)
- Nonflammable matches for kids to play with
- Using dinosaurs to produce emergency messages on the surface of a planet seen from the outer space: one has to bother the herd to make them chase you across the forest so that they trample out an inscription.:
- A substance to paint darkness into various colors
- A powder to mold the clouds into dense durable shapes
- Chronomat (time machine)
- Tarantoga's magnum opus was the founding of the human civilization (Czarna komnata profesora Tarantogi [The Black Room of Professor Tarantoga]) – After studying the biographies of leading scientists and artists, Tarantoga found that all of them were drunkards and lazy. Therefore, he started sending smart young people into various epochs to invent differential calculus, to paint the Mona Lisa, and so on.

== Appearances ==
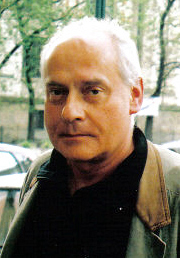
Tadeusz Huk, who playerd Tarantoga in 1992

- 1954: The Star Diaries, "The Twenty Sixth Voyage, the Last One", in the collection Sezam i inne opowiadania.
  In this story Ijon Tichy meets professor for the first time
- 1957: The Star Diaries, in "The Twelfth Voyage", in which Ijon Tichy employs Prof. Tarantoga's new invention of time acceleration on the planet of Microcephalics.
- 1962: Przygody profesora Tarantogi, Polish TV play, premiered September 21, 1962
- 1963: Wyprawa profesora Tarantogi, scenario, first print: collection Noc księżycowa
  - 1978: Die seltsamen Begenungen des Professor Tarantoga, 99 min., West Germany, director: Chuck Kerremans
    Lem disliked this adaptation, saying that all humor was lost.
    In the interview Thus Spoke... Lem Lem said "I demanded a very high fee. It was so huge that they protested, telling me that there was no such fees at all. I told them then that it was not a fee at all, only a compensation for the pain, because I knew they would screw it up terribly. An you know what? They screwed it up terribly!"
  - 1992: TV play, Poland, first aired September 5, 1992, director Maciej Wojtyszko, Tarantoga: Tadeusz Huk
    Lem spoke favorably about both the play and the director.
- 1963: Czarna komnata profesora Tarantogi, scenario, first print: collection Noc księżycowa
  - 1964: Polish TV film
- 1963: Dziwny gość profesora Tarantogi, scenario, first print: collection Noc księżycowa
  - 1971: Polish TV film
  - 1979: Professor Tarantoga und sein seltsamer Gast, TV film, 21 April 1979, East Germany, director Jens-Peter Proll
- 1975: Godzina przyjęć profesora Tarantogi, radio play
  - 1977: Professor Tarantogas Sprechstunde (de), radio play by Bayerischer Rundfunk, West Germany, director Dieter Hasselblatt. It was produced two more times, in 1978 and 1979 by Österreichischer Rundfunk, Austria
  - 1979: First time printed in collection Powtórka, 1979
- The Futurological Congress
- Observation on the Spot
- Peace on Earth
- 1986: Azerbaijanfilm Russian-language animated TV film Из дневников Йона Тихого. Путешествие на Интеропию [From the Diaries of Ijon Tichy. A Voyage to Interopia] based on "The Fourteenth Voyage"
- 2011: Ijon Tichy: Raumpilot, TV series season 2, Tarantoga played by Peter Princz

Naum Vilenkin in his 1968 popular math book Рассказы о множествах [Stories About Sets] invented a story in which Tarantoga debunks a tall tale of Ijon Tichy using concepts from combinatorics and set theory, such as Venn diagrams and the inclusion–exclusion principle.

The novel Monday Begins on Saturday by Soviet science fiction writers Boris and Arkady Strugatsky mentions "Tarantoga phenomenon" as a synonym for instant teleportation.
