= His Master's Voice (novel) =

1968 novel by Stanisław Lem

- First edition
- Author: Stanisław Lem
- Original title: Głos Pana
- Translator: Michael Kandel
- Cover artist: Andrzej Heidrich
- Language: Polish
- Genre: Social science fiction, satire, philosophical novel
- Publisher: Czytelnik
- Publication date: 1968
- Publication place: Poland
- ISBN: 0-15-640300-5
- OCLC: 9945017
- Dewey Decimal: 891.8/537 19
- LC Class: PG7158.L39 G613 1984

His Master's Voice (original Polish title: Głos Pana) is a 1960s science fiction novel written by Polish writer Stanisław Lem. It was first published in 1968 and translated into English by Michael Kandel in 1983. It is a philosophical first contact story about an effort by scientists to decode, translate, and understand an extraterrestrial transmission. It is considered to be one of the three best-known books by Lem, the other two being Solaris and The Cyberiad.

== Plot ==
The novel is written as a first-person narrative, the memoir of a mathematician named Peter Hogarth, who becomes involved in a Pentagon-directed project (code-named "His Master's Voice", or HMV for short) somewhere in the Nevada desert, where scientists are working to decode what seems to be a message from outer space (specifically, a neutrino signal from the constellation Canis Minor. Throughout the book Hogarth—or rather, Lem himself—exposes the reader to many debates merging cosmology and philosophy: from discussions of epistemology, systems theory, information theory and probability, through the idea of evolutionary biology and the possible form and motives of extraterrestrial intelligence, with digressions about ethics in military-sponsored research, to the limitations of human science constrained by the human nature subconsciously projecting itself into the analysis of any unknown subject. At some point one of the involved scientists (Rappaport), desperate for new ideas, even begins to read and discuss popular science-fiction stories, and Lem uses this opportunity to criticize the science fiction genre, as Rappaport soon becomes bored and disillusioned by monotonous plots and the unimaginative stories of pulp magazines.

Before Hogarth's arrival, the scientists were able to use part of the data to synthesize a substance with unusual properties. Two variations had been created: a viscous liquid nicknamed "Frog Eggs", and a more solid version that looks like a slab of red meat called "Lord of the Flies" (named for its strange agitating effect on insects brought into proximity with it). There is some speculation that the signal may actually be a genome and that "Frog Eggs" and "Lord of the Flies" may be a form of protoplasm; possibly that of the alien creatures that presumably sent the signal. This theory, like all the project's theories about the signal, turns out to be unverifiable.

For a short time, Hogarth suspects that the message may have a military use, and is faced with an ethical dilemma about whether and how to pursue this angle. "Frog eggs" seems to enable a teleportation of an atomic blast at the speed of light to a remote location, which would make deterrence impossible. Hogarth and the discoverer of the effect decide to conduct further research in secret before notifying the military. Eventually, they conclude that there is no military use after all (which Hogarth sees as a proof of the Senders' far-sightedness), since the uncertainty of the blast location increases with distance. The two scientists face ostracism from their colleagues, some of whom consider their conduct unpatriotic.

Some of the scientists pursue a theory that the neutrino signal might have had the effect of increasing the likelihood that life would develop on the planet eons ago. They are forced to consider whether alien beings sent the signal for this very reason. In the end, they find no certain answers.

There is much speculation about the nature of whatever alien beings might have sent the signal. They must have been technologically superior, but no one can be sure whether they were virtuous or evil. Indeed, as the signal must have been sent long ago, no one can be sure whether they still exist.

The theories the scientists come up with all seem to make some progress toward deciphering the signal; however, as is stated in the few first pages of Hogarth's memoirs, for all their efforts, the scientists are left with few new, real discoveries. By the time the project is ended, they are no more sure than they were in the beginning about whether the signal was a message from intelligent beings that humanity failed to decipher, or a poorly understood natural phenomenon.

In the end, the many theories about the signal and the beings who might have sent it say more about the scientists (and humanity) than about the signal (and the beings who might have sent it). The comparison between the signal and a Rorschach test is made more than once.

== Literary criticism ==
Dave Langford reviewed His Master's Voice for White Dwarf #49, and stated that "Lem offers a sheaf of cosmic answers, some truly mindblowing – but it isn't easy reading."

== Reviews ==
- Review by Faren Miller (1983) in Locus, #268 May 1983
- Review by Ann Collier (1984) in Vector 118
- Review by Christopher Pike (1984) in Foundation, #31 July 1984
- Review by George Zebrowski (1987) in Fantasy Review, July-August 1987
- Review by Norman Beswick (1991) in Paperback Inferno, #88
- Review by James Schellenberg (1998) in Challenging Destiny Number 3, July 1998

== Translations and derivative works ==
Głos Pana was translated from Polish into Chinese, Czech, English, Finnish, French, Georgian, German, Hungarian, Italian, Japanese, Latvian, Portuguese, Romanian, Russian, Serbian, Slovak, Slovenian and Spanish.

English translation: Stanisław Lem, His Master's Voice, translated by Michael Kandel, 1983, Harcourt Brace Jovanovich, ISBN 0151403600 (1st edition, hardcover)

In 2018, Hungarian filmmaker György Pálfi released the film (in Hungarian, available with English subtitles) Az Úr hangja ("The Lord's Voice"/"The Master's Voice") loosely based on Lem's novel.

Portuguese translation: «A Voz do Dono», translated by Teresa Fernandes Swiatkiewicz, 2023, Antígona.

== See also ==
- Message from space (science fiction) – Science fiction theme
- Search for extraterrestrial intelligence (SETI) – Effort to find civilizations not from Earth
- Wow! signal – 1977 radio signal detected as part of SETI
