= The Investigation =

1958 novel by Stanisław Lem

First edition (publ. MON) cover art by Antoni Boratyński

The Investigation (original title Śledztwo) is a science fiction/detective/thriller novel by the Polish writer Stanisław Lem. The novel incorporates a philosophical discourse on explanation of unknown phenomena. It was first published in 1958 in Przekrój magazine (issues 698-711) and in 1959 as a book by the Publishing House of the Ministry of National Defense (Wydawnictwo Ministerstwa Obrony Narodowej).

== Plot ==
The novel is set in London. A young Scotland Yard lieutenant Gregory investigates the mysterious disappearances of corpses from London morgues to reappear somewhere else. The only "explanation" is an abstruse statistical theory that correlates the body snatching with local cancer rates. The detective suspects the statistician Sciss who came up with the theory of being the perpetrator. In reality it appears as if the corpses "resurrect". Gregory suggests that the corpses are being infested by certain microorganisms, which have some kind of collective intelligence. Sciss ponders upon this and thinks that this phenomenon existed for a long time and may explain the belief in resurrection in many religions. Eventually all was explained as a highly unlikely coincidence of several factors. However it turns out that some cases do not fit...

== Discussion ==
Lem wrote that he received many angry letters from readers who demanded an explanation how corpses can move.

== Adaptations ==
In 1970s the novel was put on screen in Poland twice.

- 1973: TV film (director Marek Piestrak) (production: 1973, premiere: 1974)
  Lem was unhappy with the work, but he wrote he was aware of the extremely low budget and appreciated the director's dedication, who sometimes used dirty tricks to make shots (e.g., he pretended to be a crazy man and burst into Scotland Yard with a camera to make some valuable shots for free) .
- 1997 TV play (director Waldemar Krzystek).

== See also ==
- The Chain of Chance, Lem's 1975 novel based on a similar philosophy
