= Michael Kandel =

American translator and sci-fi author (born 1941)

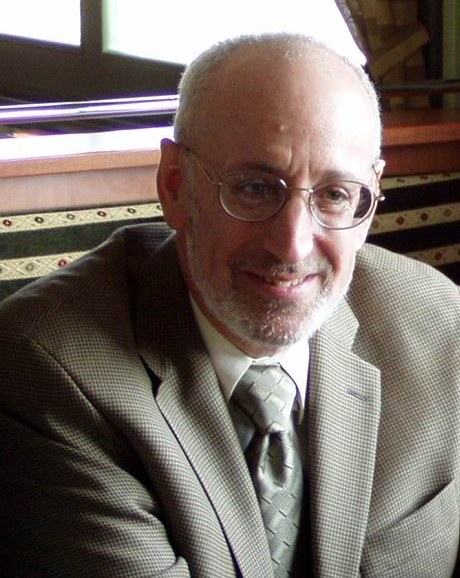
- Michael Kandel in 2005
- Born: December 24, 1941 (age 84); Baltimore, Maryland
- Education: Indiana University
- Occupations: Translator and writer
- Writing career
- Genre: Science fiction

Michael Kandel (born 24 December 1941, in Baltimore, Maryland) is an American translator and author of science fiction.

== Biography ==
Kandel received a doctorate in Slavistics from Indiana University. His most recent position was editor at the Modern Language Association. Prior to that, at Harcourt, he edited (among others) Ursula K. Le Guin's work.

Kandel is perhaps best known for his translations of the works of Stanisław Lem from Polish to English.

Recently he has also been translating works of other Polish science fiction authors, such as Jacek Dukaj, Tomasz Kołodziejczak, Marek Huberath and Andrzej Sapkowski. The quality of his translations is considered to be excellent; his skill is especially notable in the case of Lem's writing, which makes heavy use of wordplay and other difficult-to-translate devices.

== Bibliography ==
=== Novels ===
- Strange Invasion (1989)
- In Between Dragons (1990)
- Captain Jack Zodiac (1991)
- Panda Ray (1996)

=== Short fiction ===
- "Virtual Reality" (1993) in Simulations (ed. Karie Jacobson)
- "Ogre" (1994) in Black Thorn, White Rose (ed. Ellen Datlow and Terri Windling)
- "Acolytes" (1997) in The Horns of Elfland (ed. Ellen Kushner, Delia Sherman, and Donald G. Keller)
- "Wading River Dogs and More" in Asimov's, May 1998
- "Hooking Up" in Fantasy and Science Fiction, August 1999
- "Time to Go" in Fantasy and Science Fiction, November 2004
- "Enlightenment" in Thrilling Wonder Stories, Summer 2007

=== Translations ===
Stanisław Lem

- Memoirs Found in a Bathtub (with Christine Rose, 1973)
- The Cyberiad (1974)
- The Futurological Congress (1974)
- The Star Diaries (1976)
- Mortal Engines (1977)
- A Perfect Vacuum (1978)
- His Master's Voice (1983)
- Fiasco (1987)
- Peace on Earth (with Elinor Ford, 1994)
- Highcastle: A Remembrance (1995)

Paweł Huelle

- Who Was David Weiser? (1992) - first translated by Antonia Lloyd-Jones (1991).
- Moving House and Other Stories (1995) - first translated by Antonia Lloyd-Jones (1994).

Marek S. Huberath

- Nest of Worlds (Restless Books, 2014)
- "Yoo Retoont, Sneogg. Ay Noo" in A Polish Book of Monsters (PIASA Books, 2010)
- "Balm of a Long Farewell" on Words without Borders

Andrzej Stasiuk

- On the Road to Babadag (Houghton Mifflin Harcourt, 2011)

Kayko and Kokosh comic book series by Janusz Christa.

- Flying School (Egmont Poland, 2018)
- The Big Tournament (Egmont Poland, 2018)

=== Editor and translator ===
- Mortal Engines (Seabury, 1977): Stories by Stanisław Lem
- The Cosmic Carnival of Stanisław Lem: An Anthology of Entertaining Stories by the Modern Master of Science Fiction (Continuum, 1981)
- A Polish Book of Monsters: Five Dark Tales from Contemporary Poland (PIASA Books, 2010): Stories by Marek Huberath, Andrzej Sapkowski, Tomasz Kołodziejczak, Andrzej Zimniak, and Jacek Dukaj
