= Message from space =

Science fiction theme

"Message from space" is a type of "first contact" theme in science fiction. Stories of this type involve receiving an interstellar message which reveals the existence of other intelligent life in the universe.

== History ==
An early short story, A Message from Space (Joseph Schlossel, Weird Tales, March 1926) tells of an amateur who builds a ham TV set and suddenly sees an alien on the screen. The alien realises it is being watched and tells its soap opera story. The verdict of Everett Franklin Bleiler: "original ideas, but clumsy handling".

While the use of this trope does predate the scientific Search for extraterrestrial intelligence ("SETI"), initiated with Project Ozma in 1960, the use of this as a plot element in science fiction greatly increased with the publicity given by various SETI projects. Classic examples of this trope include the 1961 television script and a novel A for Andromeda by Fred Hoyle and John Elliot, the 1968 novel His Master's Voice by Stanislaw Lem, The Listeners by James E. Gunn, and Carl Sagan's novel and subsequent film Contact.

== See also ==
- Communication with extraterrestrial intelligence
