= Observation on the Spot =

1982 novel by Stanisław Lem

Polish book cover

Observation on the Spot (Polish title Wizja lokalna is an expression meaning crime scene reconstruction) is a social science fiction novel by Polish writer Stanisław Lem. The novel is a report of Ijon Tichy's travel to a faraway planet Entia (in Polish text: Encja) to study their civilization. This report was supposed to fix a misunderstanding arisen from Tichy's Fourteenth Voyage to supposedly Entia (then known as Enteropia), which turned out to be a satellite of Entia, masqueraded by Entians to misguide explorers. The travel was also to verify the results of the "Institute of Historiographical Computers" (Polish: Instytut Maszyn Dziejowych), which use predictive modeling to overcome the speed of light limitation and get information about the state of the affairs on remote planets based on information obtained from previous expeditions.

== Description ==
The major themes of the book are: the problems of the society of abundance based entirely on automated production where individuals have little to do; imposition of ethical laws through technology i.e. the "ethicsphere" which has made it impossible to harm individuals physically; and the ideological opposition of two dominant systems, which is basically a parody of Western World-Soviet Union split taken to the absurd.

The original novel was first printed by Wydawnictwo Literackie in 1982. It was translated into German by Hubert Schumann under the title Lokaltermin in 1987 (ISBN 3-518-37955-0).

Lacking English translation, the novel title was also translated in literary criticism works as "Eyewitness Account" and "The Scene of the Crime".

Science Fiction Studies published a collection of excerpts from Lem's letters which show the chronology of the creation of the novel (during 1979-1981). In the first one Lem confesses that he tried to approach the subject several times in the past few years. Also, in his essay The Philosophy of Chance Lem confesses that he struggled with the novel for many years.

At the end of the novel Lem included a "Polish-Polish dictionary" of the neologisms used in it (named "the Earthish-Earthish Glossary"). In a letter to publisher Franz Rottensteiner Lem wrote about his intention to add this glossary and to include into it an explanation why these neologisms are a necessity, not just a fantastic embellishment.

== Plot summary ==
The novel consists of four chapters.

Chapter 1 is the setup, which leads to Tichy's visit to the Institute of Historiographical Computers described in Chapter 2. Chapter 3 is the description of Tichy's flight to Entia.

In Chapter 4, Tichy arrives on Entia to discover a unique anthropomorphic civilization divided into two major states: Kurdlandia (from "kurdl") and Luzania. These names require some explanations.

Kurdl is a huge animal inhabiting the marshes of Entia. The name of the animal is Lem's invention, used in earlier tales about Ijon Tichy. (In Polish it is kurdel, however in declensions of the word the root converts into "kurdl-", hence there are no associations with the English word "curdle"). Michael Kandel translated it as "squamp" in his translation of Tichy's 14th voyage.

The name "Luzania" derives from the Polish root "luz-" with the meaning of "loose", "not restrained"; the choice will become clear below.

Kurdlandia's guiding ideology is "national mobilism", that is the vast majority of the population must live inside of the stomachs, various passages and internal organs of the kurdls. Kurdls walk about the marshes, guided by drivers, and their inhabitants hence are "able to explore the land of their wonderful country from inside of their home kurdl", in the words of a patriotic individual that Ijon Tichy spoke to. Inhabitants of the kurdls may get out periodically (at least for 24 hours a year). Exceptions are largely confined to high government officials who live outside the marshes, on dry ground, in normal houses. Kurdlandia has no technology to speak of and is proud of it.

The other state, Luzania, constitutes a treatment of the topic of an "ideal state". Luzanian's most prominent accomplishment is the creation of "ethicsphere" (compare "atmosphere"). They have produced huge numbers of molecular sized nanobots called "bystry" ("quickies" in English) that serve to control matter in the 'quickated' areas. The primary function of the 'quickies' is the enforcement of the laws of ethics as physical laws (hence the word "ethicsphere"). Hence, it is a physical law in Luzania that it is not possible to hurt an individual physically. If you try to strike your neighbor, your hand will be stopped by the suddenly increased air viscosity, (although you will not be hurt either). If you try to drown, the water will push you out. Doing non-physical harm, such as by pestering, criticizing, and otherwise mentally tormenting people is still possible, although in such a case the 'quickies' would probably help the victim to walk away from the attackers. There is a large protest movement in Luzania of people who want to end the ethicsphere, and a major element of their activities is trying to inflict harm on anybody just to prove the possibility of doing so, but they have not succeeded yet.

The 'quickies' also serve to produce material goods necessary to maintain a high standard of living. Hence, there is not much of an economic life going on, although there are limits for the amount of energy individuals may spend on satisfying their needs. Many Luzanians are involved in intellectual pursuits, such as being professors, students, and government officials, but the problem of nothing productive to do stands prominent. Apparently the 'quickies' are capable of some collective thought, at least for the purposes of self-replication and self-improvement, as well as in order to identify instances of potential harm to individuals (no small feat, no doubt). The artists of Luzania feel particularly slighted by the fact that 'quickies' can create art of all forms of much greater quality than they can; naturally, many of them are members of the protest movement.

There exists ideological opposition between Kurdlandia and Luzania. Generally speaking, many of the people holed up in the kurdls on poor rations would have been more than happy to run away and live in plenty across the border. On the other hand, many Luzanians, especially university students and faculty, dislike the consumerism and ethical limitations of freedom under the 'quickies' and call variously for the imposition of the kurdl-ism or at least for a slight rollback of the technological development and the abolition of the 'quickies', depending on the degree of radicalism of the individual. Luzanians also enjoy traveling to Kurdlandia on vacation to get out of the 'quickies' areas.

The main character spends most of his time in Luzania, studying the history of the world and the current Luzanian social system. We learn about it through his words.
