= Memoirs Found in a Bathtub =

1961 science fiction novel written by the Polish writer Stanisław Lem

- First edition
- Author: Stanisław Lem
- Original title: Pamiętnik znaleziony w wannie
- Translator: Michael Kandel and Christine Rose
- Cover artist: Daniel Mróz
- Language: Polish
- Genre: social science fiction, satire, dystopian, political fiction
- Publisher: Wydawnictwo Literackie
- Publication date: 1961
- Publication place: Poland
- English publication date: 1973
- ISBN: 0-15-658585-5
- OCLC: 12722996
- Dewey Decimal: 891.8/537 19
- LC Class: PG7158.L39 P313 1986

Memoirs Found in a Bathtub (a literal translation of the original Polish-language title: Pamiętnik znaleziony w wannie) is a science fiction novel by Polish writer Stanisław Lem, first published in 1961. It was first published in English in 1973; a second edition was published in 1986.

== Plot summary ==
Memoirs Found in a Bathtub starts with the finding of a diary in the distant future. The introduction dwells on the difficulties of historical research on the fictional 'Neogene Era', "the period of the heyday of the pre-Chaotic culture, which preceded the Great Decomposition". "Great Decomposition" refers to the apocalyptic event of "papyrolysis", decomposition of all paper on the planet in the pre-information-technology era, causing all records and money to turn into dust––the end of the "epoch of papycracy".

The diary, known as the 'Notes of a Man from the Neogene', was found in the lava-filled ruins of Third Pentagon within the territory of the disappeared state of Ammer-Ka. Previously, little was known about the hypothetical 'Last Pentagon'. One researcher suggested that Pentagon was a kind of military brain, the center in charge of maintaining the faith of Cap-i-Taal, dominant in Ammer-Ka in the period of U-S. This was confirmed by the finding of the diary, supposedly of an agent trapped deep within the subterranean bowels of the vast Third Pentagon, although the authenticity and authorship of the document were questioned by some researchers.

The rest of the book is the diary itself. In a Kafkaesque maelstrom of terrifying bureaucratic confusion and utter insanity, the agent attempts to follow his mission directives, conducting on-the-spot investigations: "Verify. Search. Destroy. Incite. Inform. Over and out. On the nth day nth hour sector n subsector n rendezvous with N." The narrator inhabits a paranoid dystopia where nothing is as it seems, chaos seems to rule all events, and everyone is deeply suspicious of everyone else.

== Commentary ==
Theodore Sturgeon described Memoirs Found in a Bathtub as "A well-wrought nightmare indeed."

Lem himself describes the book as a "combination of grim weirdness with humor". He writes that the novel goes beyond casual political satire: it puts forth the "totalization of the notion of intentionality". Explaining the concept, he writes that everything which humans perceive may be interpreted by them as a message, and that a number of "-isms" are based on interpreting the whole Universe as a message to its inhabitants. This interpretation may be exploited for political purposes and then run amok beyond their intentions.

The title alludes to Jan Potocki's novel The Manuscript Found in Saragossa.
