= Ijon Tichy =

Fictional character in works by Polish science fiction writer Stanisław Lem

Ijon Tichy (Polish pronunciation: [ˈijɔn ˈtixɨ], Tee-khee) is a fictional character who appears in several works of the Polish science fiction writer Stanisław Lem: initially in The Star Diaries (and Memoirs of a Space Traveller: Further Reminiscences of Ijon Tichy, issued in English translation as a separate volume), later in The Futurological Congress, Peace on Earth, and Observation on the Spot. Tichy is also the narrator in a 1973 novel Professor A. Dońda, being the professor's sidekick.

== Character ==
Tichy is a space explorer whose interplanetary experiences are chronicled in The Star Diaries. He also moves in scientific circles on Earth; he is invited to the Futurological Congress in Costa Rica, and his endorsement and approval are sought by a number of researchers and inventors on the edge of their field, such as doctor Diagoras, who has developed an artificial intelligence that is independent of mankind, and Decantor, who has invented an immortal soul.

Tichy himself is the narrator in all the stories in which he appears. Sometimes he is the protagonist; sometimes he merely serves to introduce some other character who has a story to tell. He is unmarried, usually well-meaning, accident-prone, and commendably honest about his failures, which include (thanks to another unfortunate experience with time) the entire Universe as we know it.

Professor Tarantoga, in his fictional preface for The Star Diaries lists Tichy's four literary predecessors: Baron Münchausen, Pavlushka Masloboinikov (one of the fictitious narrators from Mikhail Saltykov-Shchedrin's satirical novel The History of a Town), Lemuel Gulliver, and Maître Alcofribas Nasier (fictitious author of François Rabelais' series of satirical novels Gargantua and Pantagruel). Literary critics (real ones) offer other parallels to the character.

== Stories ==
The Tichy stories are mostly comic or satirical, often exploring traditional science fiction themes, in a form that can be described as "science fiction tall tales". They are sometimes taken to deliberately ridiculous lengths, as in the episode of The Star Diaries where the unfortunate Tichy, caught in a time loop, is repeatedly banged on the head with a saucepan wielded by future versions of himself. In other stories Tichy meets alien civilisations whose detached perspective enables Lem to poke fun at humanity; on one of his voyages Tichy meets a priest whose colleague has been horrifically martyred by a thoroughly unselfish and well-intentioned race of aliens because he had told them that a martyr's death was one of the greatest things to which a Christian could aspire. Elsewhere Tichy meets a race of aliens (called "Indioci" in the Polish original, "Phools" in the English translation) who, desiring perfect harmony in their lives, entrust themselves to a machine, which converts them into shiny discs to be arranged in pleasant patterns across their planet.

== Genealogy ==
A genealogical sketch of Tichy family is given in Lem's Star Diaries. Notable family members are:

- Anonymus, the founder of the main Tichy family branch. He is surrounded by a mystery, including the origins of the surname. Some say it was Anonym's cognomen, arising from the fact he did not say a word during the trial on an accusation of eating his twin and in fact it should be "Cichy" ("quiet" in Polish) rather than Tichy, but the notary lisped...
- Jeremiasz Tichy, grandfather of Ijon, famous for the fact that he "decided to create the General Theory of Everything, and nothing stopped him from doing this".

== In film ==
=== German TV series ===
On 26 March 2007, the German public television channel ZDF began broadcasting 15-minute episodes of Ijon Tichy: Raumpilot with Oliver Jahn as protagonist and Nora Tschirner as Analoge Halluzinelle. Employing CGI, the series portray Tichy travels e.g. in a "three-bedroom rocket", which strongly resembles a French press on the outside and a 1970s Berlin apartment on the inside. The TV adventures often deviate somewhat from those told in the Star Diaries, in part due to the tight 15-minute frame. The series was made available on internet in streaming video.

Asteroids 343000 Ijontichy and 343444 Halluzinelle are named in commemoration of the series.

=== Other ===
See article The Star Diaries for more.

In addition, in the 1965 Polish science fiction short Przyjaciel ["The Friend"] based on the story with the same name from the collection An Invasion from Aldebaran the narrator's name is engineer Tichy.
