= The Star Diaries =

1957 book of short stories by Stanisław Lem

- First edition
- Author: Stanisław Lem
- Original title: Polish: Dzienniki gwiazdowe
- Translator: English: Michael Kandel
- Illustrator: Stanisław Lem
- Cover artist: Marian Stachurski
- Language: Polish, English, German, Russian
- Genre: Science fiction, satire, philosophical fiction
- Publisher: Iskry (1957)
- Publication date: 1957, 1971
- Publication place: Poland
- English publication date: 1976
- Media type: Print (paperback)

The Star Diaries is a series of short stories of the adventures of space traveller Ijon Tichy, of satirical nature, by Polish writer Stanisław Lem. The first ones were published in a 1954 collection Sezam i inne opowiadania (Note: In fact the first publication of "the Twenty-fourth Voyage" appeared in the December 27, 1953 issue of Życie Literackie weekly under the title "Powiastki galaktyczne. Z przygód słynnego gwiazdokrążcy, Ijona Tichego. Podróż dwudziesta trzecia" ["Galactic Tales. From the Adventures of the Famous Star Wanderer Ijon Tichy. The Twenty-Third Voyage"]) and first published as a separate book in 1957 titled Dzienniki gwiazdowe, expanded in 1971. Closely related to this series is the series Ze wspomnień Ijona Tichego [From the Memoirs of Ijon Tichy]. Usually these stories, and several others, are considered to be the same cycle of the adventures of Ijon Tichy.

The permit of the Communist censors for the 1954 publication described The Star Diaries as a satire of the capitalist society while failing to notice numerous parallels with the Communist society.

The collections were published in English in two volumes, The Star Diaries (published New York, 1976) and Memoirs of a Space Traveller: Further Reminiscences of Ijon Tichy (published London, 1982).

== Stories ==
=== The Star Diaries ===
Translated by Michael Kandel.

- Introduction and Introduction to the Expanded Edition, in which professor Tarantoga presents the latest information on the documentation of Ijon Tichy's exploits.
- "The Seventh Voyage", in which a spaceship defect forces Tichy through a series of time vortices, creating a multitude of temporal copies of himself.
- "The Eighth Voyage", in which Ijon Tichy represents Earth to petition for its admission to the United Planets.
- "The Eleventh Voyage", in which Ijon Tichy travels in disguise to the planet Circia to attempt to bring an end to hostilities coming from its robot population.
- "The Twelfth Voyage", in which Ijon Tichy employs Prof. Tarantoga's new invention of time acceleration on the planet of Microcephalics.
- "The Thirteenth Voyage", in which Ijon Tichy sets out to meet Master Oh. Instead, he finds two planets (Pinta and Panta) ruled according to the Master's principles. On Pinta, people are trying to become fish using a technique called evolution by persuasion. On Panta, all inhabitants are identical clones and exchange their jobs daily.
- "The Fourteenth Voyage", in which Ijon Tichy goes hunting for Squamp (Polish: kurdel) - an animal whose area is several hectares and is being puzzled by mysterious objects, called scrupts (Polish: sepulki).
- "The Twentieth Voyage", in which Ijon Tichy is forced by his future self to lead a programme to ameliorate Earth's and mankind's history.
- "The Twenty-first Voyage", in which Ijon Tichy visits Dichotica (Polish: Dykhtonia) - a civilisation which achieved total corporeal and mental plasticity after a thousand-year rule by automorphists, the local equivalent of transhumanists.
- "The Twenty-second Voyage", in which Ijon Tichy learns of the troubles of evangelising extraterrestrial civilisations.
- "The Twenty-third Voyage", in which Ijon Tichy visits a tiny planet, whose inhabitants save living space by frequently storing themselves as 'atom dust'.
- "The Twenty-fifth Voyage"
- "The Twenty-eighth Voyage"

The translator's note to this work adds that “the numbering of the Voyages conceals their true chronology: the Seventh appeared in 1964, the Fourteenth in 1957, the Eighteenth in 1971, the Twenty-second in 1954, and so on. Lem does not intend these adventures of Ijon Tichy to be read in the order in which they were written. That order however–22, 23, 25, 11, 12, 13, 14, 7, 8, 28, 20, 21–does reflect his development as a writer. For though there is much consistency of theme throughout the Diaries… the reader, looking chronologically, will find a definite shift from playful anecdote to pointed satire to outright philosophy.

=== Memoirs of a Space Traveler: Further Reminiscences of Ijon Tichy ===
Translated by Joel Stern and Maria Swiecicka-Ziemianek

- "The Eighteenth Voyage", in which Ijon Tichy helps create the cause of our universe from a single electron.
- "The Twenty-fourth Voyage", in which Ijon Tichy visits a civilisation which has assigned all power to a machine to establish planetary harmony and avoid mass unemployment. The machine changed them all into shiny discs to be arranged in pleasant patterns across their planet.
- "Further Reminiscences of Ijon Tichy (Parts I-V)"
  - I (“Professor Corcoran”),
  - II (“Professor Decantor”),
  - III (“Professor Zazul”),
  - IV (“Mr Molteris, the Physicist”)
  - V (“Tragedia pralnicza” - “The Washing Machine Tragedy”),
- "Doctor Diagoras"
- "Let Us Save the Universe (An Open Letter from Ijon Tichy)"

The 2017 Kindle edition contains the first English translation of the following novel:

- "Professor A. Dońda"

=== Other stories from elsewhere ===
- "Zakład doktora Vliperdiusa" ("Dr. Vliperdius' Factory") (1964)
- "Pożytek ze smoka" ("On the Utility of the Dragon"), written in 1983. First published in German as "Vom Nutzen des Drachen" (Metall, 1983).Translated into Russian as "О выгодности дракона" (1991), translated by Konstantin Dushenko. The first Polish print was in the collection of the same name, Pożytek ze smoka (1993).

Although the narration is from the first person, it is commonly recognized that the narrator is Ijon Tichy. The story is about the travel of Tichy to the planet Abrazia (Polish: Abrazja), where, as Tichy had heard, the economy of the local civilization was based on the single huge dragon. The dragon is an allegory of the Soviet Union and its relations to its satellite states ("Soviet Empire"). Later a postscript was added to the story: "P.S. They say the dragon broke up into small ones, but their appetite did not decrease."

  - Quotations related to "Pożytek ze smoka" at Wikiquote (Russian and Polish quotations)
- "Ijon Tichy's Last Voyage" (not to be confused with "The Twenty-sixth and Last Voyage"); only published in the German (October 1996) and Polish (May 1999) editions of Playboy.
- The 1961 short story Formuła Lymphatera Lymphater's Formula was first published in the collection Księga robotów (Book of Robots) with the pre-annotation "from the memoirs of Ijon Tichy". The story was never republished with this pre-annotation, and nothing in the novel gives any indication at Ijon Tichy. Piotr Krywak tried to figure out possible explanations for this, apart from a typographical error. Translated to English by Antonia Lloyd-Jones in: Stanisław Lem. The truth and other stories Cambridge, Mass.: MIT Press, 2021.

=== Never translated into English ===
- "The Twenty-sixth and Last Voyage", a pro-Communist satire on Cold War. In this story, after a confused landing, Ijon finds himself amid an antagonism between two superpowers "Merka" and "Rasha", and recognizes his confusion only standing in front of the House Un-American Activities Committee. The story was never republished after 1957. In the 1971 edition of Dzienniki gwiazdowe, the (fictional) introduction written by professor Tarantoga explains that, according to the Institute of Tychology, the 26th voyage does not belong to the pen of Ijon Tichy, i.e., it was an apocryphal tale.

== Adaptations ==
In 1965 a Polish TV film Professor Zazul was released, director Marek Nowicki.

In 2001 and 2002, two german independent short films were made, running about 15 minutes each, directed by Dennis Jacobsen, Randa Chahoud, and Oliver Jahn (Jahn also played the main character Ijon Tichy), with Nora Tschirner starring as a female hologram. In 2006, the same team produced a miniseries called Ijon Tichy: Raumpilot for German TV, containing of 6 episodes of 15 length, which premiered March 2007 on ZDF. A second series of 8 episodes followed in 2011.

Theater in Quarantine and Sinking Ship Productions adapted "The Seventh Voyage", in which Tichy gets stuck in a time loop, into a work of streaming theater during the COVID-19 pandemic. The piece was created by director Jonathan Levin, playwright Josh Luxenberg, and performer Joshua William Gelb. The adaption, titled The 7th Voyage of Egon Tichy, was live-streamed twice on July 30, 2020, and posted on YouTube. It made use of Gelb's closet to represent Tichy's spaceship, and Gelb performed live with pre-recorded images of himself.

The Seventh Voyage is also the basis of Pokój ("Room"), a comedy film by Krzysztof Jankowski premiered on February 5, 2021. In the film Tichy (Wojciech Solarz) was going to announce a protest against the weaponizing the "spacetime warper" at the Panslavic Parliament, but he was seized by the antagonists and a new weapon was tested upon him. A side effect of the weapon is the multiplication of Tichy. Instead of taking an advantage of this for an escape, Tichy starts to argue with his clones, leading to comic situations similar to these in "The Seventh Voyage". "The Eleventh Voyage" was a basis of the 1999 Futurama episode "Fear of a Bot Planet". In Lem's story Ijon Tichy crash-lands on a planet populated with human-hating robots, so he disguises himself as a robot. Eventually he finds out that all robots are in fact disguised humans. The story in Futurama loosely uses the plot trick of the planet of human-hating robots.

"The Fourteenth Voyage" was rendered as an animation film in the Soviet Union in 1985. Produced by Azerbaijanfilm in Russian language, this 10-minute film was titled From the Diaries of Ijon Tichy. A Voyage to Enteropia (Russian: Из дневников Ийона Тихого. Путешествие на Интеропию). Its screenwriter and director is Russian animator Gennady Tischchenko.
