= Solaris =

Solaris may refer to:

== Arts and entertainment ==
=== Literature, television and film ===
- Solaris (novel), a 1961 science fiction novel by Stanisław Lem
  - Solaris (1968 film), directed by Boris Nirenburg
  - Solaris (1972 film), directed by Andrei Tarkovsky
  - Solaris (2002 film), directed by Steven Soderbergh
  - Solaris (fictional planet), the planet around which the novel and its adaptations are set
- Solaris, a ship in the animated series The Mysterious Cities of Gold
- Solaris Knight, a character in the TV series Power Rangers: Mystic Force
- Suzie Solaris, a character in the movie Murderers' Row
- Birdman and the Galaxy Trio, an animated series known as Solaris in France
- Solaris (magazine), a Canadian science-fiction magazine

=== Music ===
- Solaris, an opera composed by Dai Fujikura, on a libretto by Saburo Teshigawara based on Stanislaw Lem's novel
- Solaris (opera), an opera composed by Detlev Glanert (2010–12)
- Solaris (band), a progressive rock band from Hungary
- Solaris (Photek album), 2000
- Solaris (Elliot Minor album), 2009
- Solaris (The Ocean album), 2026
- Sólaris, a 2011 album by Daníel Bjarnason and Ben Frost
- "Solaris", a song on Failure's 1996 album Fantastic Planet
- "Solaris", a song on Juno Reactor's 2000 album Shango
- "Solaris", a song on Buck-Tick's 2010 album Razzle Dazzle

=== Video games ===
- Solaris (video game) (1986), for the Atari 2600
- Solaris (DAH2), a Russian Moon base in Destroy All Humans! 2
- The overarching antagonist and final boss in the 2006 video game Sonic the Hedgehog
- One of the bosses in Path of Exile
- A country in the Xenogears video game
- A race of debt slaves with augmented bodies in the online game Warframe

=== Other uses in arts and entertainment ===
- Solaris (DC Comics), a supervillain
- Solaris VII, a world in the fictional BattleTech universe

== Organisations ==
- Solaris (credit institution), a German financial services company
- Solaris (synchrotron), a cyclic particle accelerator in Kraków, Poland
- Solaris Books, a British publisher
- Solaris Bus & Coach, a Polish vehicle producer
- Solaris Mobile, a satellite communications service provider
- Solaris Pictures, an Indian film production company

== Other uses ==
- Solaris (grape)
- Solaris (star)
- Solaris (yacht)
- Oracle Solaris, an operating system originally developed by Sun Microsystems
- Hyundai Solaris, a car
- SOLARIS, a proposed space-based solar power program
- Solaris, a brand of photographic film made by Ferrania
- Solaris, a community in Albemarle County, Virginia
- Solaris, a part of the Houdini graphics software package

== See also ==
- Solar (disambiguation)
- Solaria (disambiguation)
