= Polish names in space =

There are a number of objects in the Solar System that have been named after Polish people or places. Many of these are craters on the terrestrial planets but asteroids and exoplanets have also received Polish names.

== Moon ==
- Armiński (crater)
- Gadomski (crater)
- Kepínski (crater)
- Lubiniezky (crater)

Math

== Mercury ==
- Boznańska crater
- Chopin (crater)
- Komeda crater
- Mickiewicz (crater)

== Venus ==
- Badarzewska crater
- Jadwiga crater
- Janina crater
- Konopnicka crater
- Landowska crater
- Nalkowska crater
- Olesnicka crater
- Wanda (crater)
- Zosia crater

== Mars ==
- Copernicus (Martian crater)
- Grójec crater
- Puławy crater

== Asteroids ==
- 198820 Iwanowska
- 199950 Sierpc
- 279377 Lechmankiewicz
- 471143 Dziewanna (TNO)

== Stars ==
- Solaris (star)

== Exoplanets ==
- Pirx (planet)
