= Takanobu (crater) =

Crater on Mercury

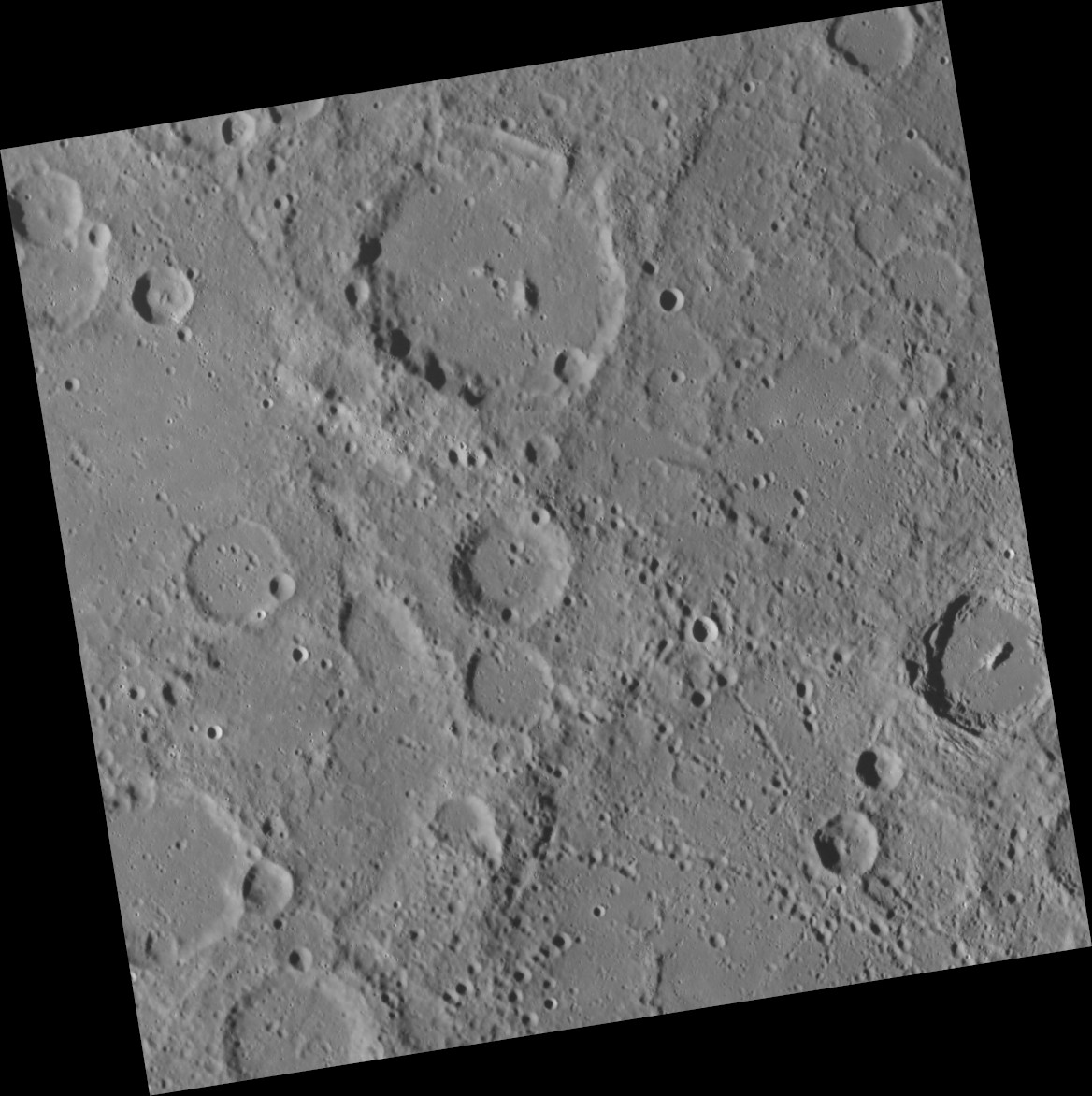
- MESSENGER WAC with Takanobu at top center
- Planet: Mercury
- Coordinates: 30.66°N 108.56°W
- Quadrangle: Shakespeare
- Diameter: 72.0 km (44.7 mi)
- Eponym: Fujiwara no Takanobu

Takanobu is a crater on Mercury. Its name was adopted by the International Astronomical Union (IAU) in 1985. The crater is named for Japanese poet and portrait artist Fujiwara no Takanobu. The crater was first imaged by Mariner 10 in 1974.

Takanobu lies about midway between the craters Gibran to the northwest and Mickiewicz to the southeast.

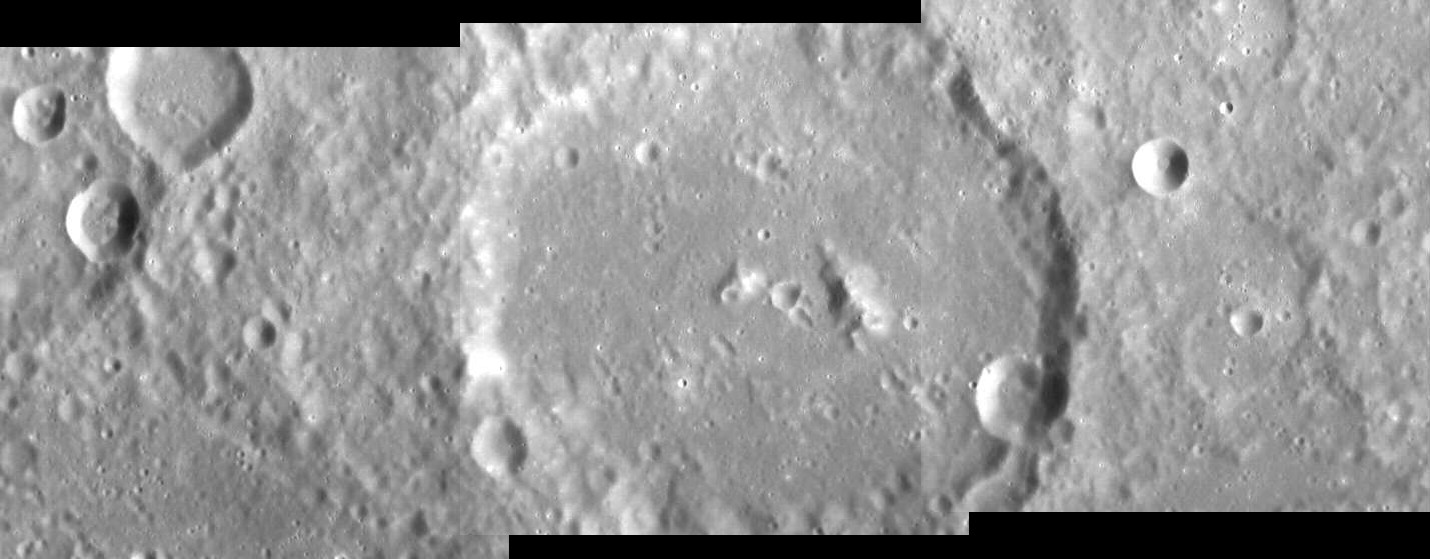
MESSENGER mosaic
