= Solarius =

Solarius may refer to:

- Petrus Antonius Solarius (c. 1445–1493), a Swiss Italian architect
- the blue wizard in the 1982 The Flight of Dragons animated movie
- a character in Overlord and Overlord II, an emperor
- an archbishop of Strasbourg
- the lyrics dedicated to the destiny of the Armenian nation by Alexander Varbedian
- the brother of Sirius Torijano, a widely renowned Colombian violinist

== See also ==
- Solar (disambiguation)
