= HD 240210 =

Giant star in the constellation Cassiopeia

Observation data Epoch J2000.0 Equinox ICRS
- Constellation: Cassiopeia
- Right ascension: 23^{h} 10^{m} 29.22625^{s}
- Declination: +57° 01′ 46.0274″
- Apparent magnitude (V): 8.33

Characteristics
- Evolutionary stage: giant
- Spectral type: K3III
- B−V color index: 1.63

Astrometry
Radial velocity (R_{v})	+8.82±0.12 km/s
Proper motion (μ)	RA: 18.529±0.018 mas/yr Dec.: 6.893±0.018 mas/yr
Parallax (π)	2.6380±0.0168 mas
Distance	1,236 ± 8 ly (379 ± 2 pc)
Absolute bolometric magnitude (M_{bol})	+0.38

Details
Mass	1.25±0.25 M_{☉}
Radius	25.46+1.16 −0.75 R_{☉}
Luminosity	152±3 L_{☉}
Surface gravity (log g)	2.31±0.11 cgs
Temperature	4,019+60 −90 K
Metallicity [Fe/H]	−0.18±0.12 dex
Rotation	> 654 days
Rotational velocity (v sin i)	< 1.0 km/s
Age	3.0+2.9 −1.5 Gyr

Other designations
- BD+56°2959, HD 240210, SAO 35195, PPM 41549

Database references
SIMBAD	data
Exoplanet Archive	data

HD 240210 is a star in the northern constellation of Cassiopeia. It has an orange hue but is too faint to be viewed with the naked eye, having an apparent visual magnitude of 8.33. Parallax measurements provide an estimate of its distance from the Sun as approximately 1,230 light years. It is drifting further away with a radial velocity of +8.82 km/s.

This is an aging giant star with a class of K3, which has exhausted the supply of hydrogen at its core and expanded to 25 times the radius of the Sun. It is around three billion years old with 1.3 times the Sun's mass. The star is radiating 152 times the luminosity of the Sun from its enlarged photosphere at an effective temperature of 4,019 K. It is spinning slowly, with each rotation taking at least 1.8 years.

On June 10, 2009 a planet orbiting the star was discovered by Niedzielski et al. This exoplanet is a 6.9 or greater Jupiter mass planet. Evidence for additional planetary companions has been found.

The HD 240210 planetary system
Companion (in order from star)	Mass	Semimajor axis (AU)	Orbital period (days)	Eccentricity	Inclination (°)	Radius
b	≥ 6.90 M_{J}	1.33	501.75±2.33	0.15±0.02	—	—

== See also ==
- BD+14°4559
- BD+20°2457
- List of extrasolar planets
- John Flamsteed
