= Solar =

Solar may refer to:

== Astronomy ==
- Of or relating to the Sun
  - Solar telescope, a special purpose telescope used to observe the Sun
  - A device that utilizes solar energy (e.g. "solar panels")
  - Solar calendar, a calendar whose dates indicate the position of the Earth on its revolution around the Sun
  - Solar eclipse, an eclipse of a sun in which it is obstructed by the moon
  - Solar System, the planetary system made up by the Sun and the objects orbiting it
- Solar Maximum Mission, a satellite
- SOLAR (ISS), an observatory on International Space Station

== Music ==
- "Solar" (composition), attributed to Miles Davis
- Solar (Red Garland album), 1962
- Solar (Taeyang album), 2010
- Solar, a 2011 album by Rubik
- "Solar", a 2011 instrumental by Nicky Romero
- "Solar", a song by Northlane from Mesmer, 2017
- "Solar", a song by Sault from Air, 2022
- ”Solar”, a song by Stam1na from Taival, 2018
- SOLAR Records, a record label

== Geography ==
- Solar (Spanish term), a type of urban site
- Solar, County Antrim, Northern Ireland, a townland
- Solar, Erode, India
- Solar, Iran, Iran

== Companies ==
- Solar Entertainment Corporation, a Philippine television and radio media company
  - Solar TV, a former TV channel
  - Solar Sports, its pay TV sports channel
  - Solar Learning, its free TV educational channel
- Solar Television Network, Inc., a former name of the media company Nine Media Corporation
  - Solar News Channel, a defunct television news channel in the Philippines (terrestrial)
- Solar Turbines, a gas turbine company

== People ==
- Solar (name), list of people with the name
- Solar (singer) (born 1991), leader and member of Korean girl group Mamamoo
- Iván Solar Gil, Spanish drag queen

== Technology ==
- Solar energy or solar power
- Solar panel
- USS Solar, a ship
- Wright Solar, a bus body

== Other uses ==
- Solar (comics), an American fictional comic book character
- Solar (novel), by Ian McEwan
- Solar (room), a place in many medieval homes
- Solar 2, a 2011 video game
- Solar SC, an American youth soccer club
- Solar, a variant of diesel fuel sold in Indonesia

== See also ==
- Apache Solr
- Sol (disambiguation)
- Solaar
- Solar One (disambiguation)
- Soler (disambiguation)
- Solari (disambiguation)
- Solaris (disambiguation)
- Solarisation (disambiguation)
- Solarius (disambiguation)
- Solaire
