= HD 240210 b =

Jupiter-like exoplanet orbiting the star HD 240210

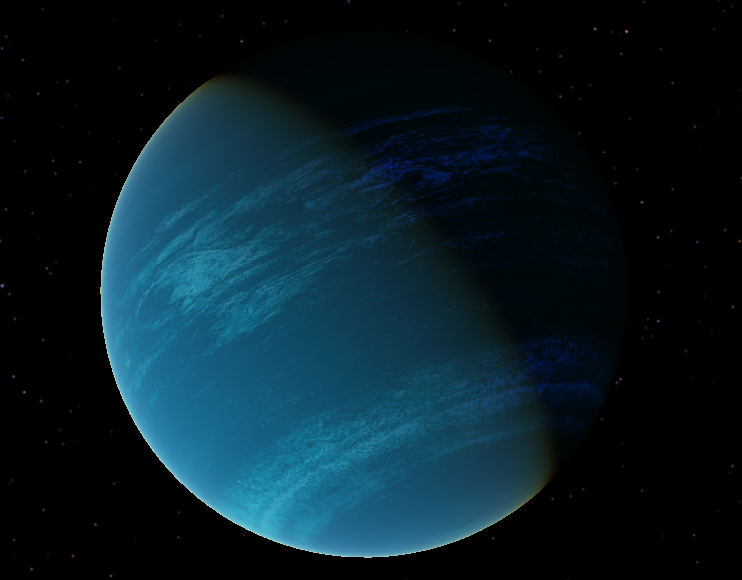
- Artistic rendering of HD 240210 b

Discovery
- Discovered by: Niedzielski et al.
- Discovery site: La Silla Observatory
- Discovery date: June 10, 2009
- Detection method: radial velocity

Orbital characteristics
- Apastron: 1.53 AU (229,000,000 km)
- Periastron: 1.13 AU (169,000,000 km)
- Semi-major axis: 1.33 AU (199,000,000 km)
- Eccentricity: 0.15 ± 0.02
- Orbital period (sidereal): 501.75 ± 2.33 d 1.3737 ± 0.0064 y
- Time of periastron: 54486.73 ± 10.93
- Argument of periastron: 277.49 ± 7.77
- Star: HD 240210

HD 240210 b is a 6.9 Jupiter-mass exoplanet discovered on June 10, 2009 by Niedzielski Etal. using the Hobby-Eberly Telescope. It orbits the K3 giant star HD 240210 in the constellation of Cassiopeia. Its average orbital separation is at 1.33 Astronomical Units away from its star with a year of 501.75 days.

== See also ==
- BD+14°4559 b
- BD+20°2457 b
- BD+20°2457 c
- HD 240210
