= Solaris (2002 film) =

Film by Steven Soderbergh

- Theatrical release poster
- Directed by: Steven Soderbergh
- Screenplay by: Steven Soderbergh
- Based on: Solaris by Stanisław Lem
- Produced by: James Cameron; Rae Sanchini; Jon Landau
- Starring: George Clooney; Natascha McElhone; Jeremy Davies; Viola Davis; Ulrich Tukur
- Cinematography: Peter Andrews (Note: Peter Andrews and Mary Ann Bernard are pseudonyms for Steven Soderbergh when credited as a cinematographer and editor, respectively.)
- Edited by: Mary Ann Bernard
- Music by: Cliff Martinez
- Production company: Lightstorm Entertainment
- Distributed by: 20th Century Fox
- Release date: November 27, 2002
- Running time: 99 minutes
- Country: United States
- Language: English
- Budget: $47 million
- Box office: $30 million

Solaris is a 2002 American science fiction drama film written for the screen and directed by Steven Soderbergh, produced by James Cameron and Jon Landau, and starring George Clooney and Natascha McElhone, with Jeremy Davies, Viola Davis and Ulrich Tukur in supporting roles. It is based on the 1961 science fiction novel of the same name by Polish writer Stanisław Lem. Reflecting on Andrei Tarkovsky's critically acclaimed 1972 film Solaris (which was itself preceded by a 1968 Soviet TV film), Soderbergh promised to be closer in spirit to Lem's novel.

The film is set almost entirely on a space station orbiting the planet Solaris, adding flashbacks to the previous experiences of its main characters on Earth. The protagonist, Dr. Chris Kelvin, struggles with the questions of Solaris's motivation, his beliefs and memories, and reconciling what was lost with an opportunity for a second chance.

Produced by Cameron's Lightstorm Entertainment, Solaris was released by 20th Century Fox on November 27, 2002. Despite positive reviews from critics, the film was a box office failure, only grossing $30 million worldwide on a budget of $47 million.

== Plot ==
Emissaries for DBA, a corporation operating a space station orbiting the planet Solaris, approach clinical psychologist Dr. Chris Kelvin and relay a message sent from his scientist friend Dr. Gibarian. Gibarian requests that Kelvin come to the station to help understand an unusual phenomenon but is unwilling to explain more. DBA is unsure how to proceed, as the mission to study Solaris has been sidetracked and none of the astronauts want to return home. In addition, DBA lost contact with the security force dispatched to the station. Kelvin agrees to a solo mission to Solaris as a last attempt to bring the crew home safely.

Upon arriving at Solaris Station onboard the Athena, Kelvin learns that Gibarian committed suicide and most of the crew either died or disappeared. The surviving crew members, Snow and Dr. Gordon, are reluctant to explain the situation at hand. The situation is further complicated when Kelvin sees a young boy running through the station. Once alone in his quarters, Kelvin dreams about his long dead wife Rheya. He awakens shocked and terrified to encounter Rheya, apparently alive again beside him in bed. Kelvin leads this "Rheya" into an escape pod and jettisons the pod into space. Afterward, he confides his actions to Snow and comes to understand that replicas of the crew's loved ones have been mysteriously appearing (the little boy he saw earlier is apparently a replica of Gibarian's son). Rheya manifests a second time, but this time Kelvin lets her stay. Gradually, this version of Rheya comes to realize that she does not feel human; her memories feel artificial, in that she lacks the emotional attachment that comes with actually having lived them.

The real Rheya had a disturbed upbringing and emotional difficulties. She also had an abortion but did not tell Kelvin about it. When he learned this, Kelvin was so distraught he left her. Rheya then committed suicide and was later found by Kelvin when he returned.

Kelvin, the replica of Rheya, Snow and Gordon meet to discuss the situation. In frustration at Kelvin's apparent attachment to the virtual Rheya, Gordon blurts out what Kelvin did to the previous Rheya replica. An appalled Rheya abandons the meeting. Kelvin confronts Gordon, who in turn chastises him for getting emotionally involved with something that is not really human and may eventually pose a threat to human beings on the station as well as on Earth. Later, apparently during a dream, Kelvin has a vision of Gibarian, and asks what Solaris wants. Gibarian balks at the idea of knowing an alien entity's motivations, or even that it might have motivations, and tells Kelvin simply that "there are no answers, only choices". Kelvin wakes to find that Rheya has killed herself. Soon afterward, she self-resurrects, and it is revealed that other manifestations who have "died" had done the same.

Gordon develops an apparatus which can permanently destroy a replica but Kelvin objects to using it on Rheya. Driven by his own grief and guilt over the "real" Rheya's death on Earth, he begins ingesting a chemical stimulant to stay awake in order to monitor Rheya, trying to avoid repeating the past and essentially abandoning her to suicide. Kelvin eventually falls asleep and Rheya successfully petitions Gordon to destroy her with the apparatus as she has done for her own replica(s). Traumatized, Kelvin confronts Gordon who maintains she merely facilitated an assisted suicide and only strives for the preservation of the humans on the station.

Kelvin and Gordon then discover a dead body stashed away in a ceiling vent in the station's cold room – Snow. The Snow they have been interacting with is a replica. Confronted by Gordon and Kelvin, the Snow replica explains that upon being dreamed into existence, he was attacked by the real Snow and thus killed him in self-defense. He goes on to say that repeat usage of the apparatus has drained the station's fuel cell reactor, making a return trip to Earth impossible. Furthermore, Solaris has begun to exponentially increase its mass, thereby gravitationally pulling the space station inexorably toward the planet. Gordon and Kelvin begin prepping the Athena to escape.

Back on Earth, Kelvin struggles to return to normal life, haunted by the idea that he "remembered her wrong"—that is, Rheya as being invariably suicidal. When he accidentally cuts his finger in his kitchen, the wound immediately heals, and it is then that Kelvin realizes that he never returned to Earth. In a flashback, Kelvin decides not to board the Athena, and Gordon leaves him behind. As the space station is engulfed by Solaris, the replica of Gibarian's young son appears and offers his hand in assistance. In the kitchen, Rheya appears to Kelvin yet again. This time, however, she is tranquil, and assures Kelvin that they no longer have to think in terms like "life" and "death," and that all they have ever done is forgiven.

== Cast ==
- George Clooney as Dr. Chris Kelvin
- Natascha McElhone as Rheya
- Viola Davis as Dr. Gordon
- Jeremy Davies as Snow
- Ulrich Tukur as Gibarian
- John Cho as DBA Emissary #1

== Production ==
For a while, James Cameron was looking to remake Solaris. His production company Lightstorm Entertainment spent close to five years securing the rights with both author Stanisław Lem and the Russian film studio Mosfilm, which owns the 1972 Russian film by Andrei Tarkovsky based on the novel. However, because of his many commitments in the 90s, Cameron was unable to take on directing duties.

What I would've done would've been more like The Abyss, where visual set pieces might have gotten in the way of what is a clean line as a relationship film. [Soderbergh]'s not interested in the hardware or the visual effects very much, which is good.

— Cameron, on Soderbergh's take of the story

In 2000, around the time Steven Soderbergh was working on Traffic, he pitched his ideas of a Solaris film adaptation to Cameron and Lightstorm producers Rae Sanchini and Jon Landau. Cameron was thrilled with what he heard and development began on the project. As Traffic was wrapping up, Soderbergh began drafting a script. Using both the 1972 film and the book as reference, the script allowed him to dig into various themes and subjects he wasn't able to come to terms with in his earlier films. Soon after, Soderbergh and Lightstorm took the story to 20th Century Fox.

Soderbergh originally intended Daniel Day-Lewis to play the role of Chris Kelvin, but Day-Lewis was busy with Martin Scorsese's Gangs of New York at the time. Since George Clooney was Soderbergh's producing partner, having formed Section Eight Productions together in 2000, Soderbergh was obligated to send Clooney a copy of the Solaris script. A month later, during the editing of Ocean's Eleven, Soderbergh received a letter from Clooney stating that he was ready to step into the role.

Because both Soderbergh and Clooney had prior commitments at the time, the film did not enter production until close to mid-2002. Principal photography began May 5, 2002 in downtown Los Angeles. Following a week of filming exteriors, the crew moved to the Warner Bros. lot where it shot on stages 19 and 20 for the remainder of production. These were the same stages that held the sets for Soderbergh's Ocean's Eleven.

In addition to fulfilling the roles of director and screenwriter, Soderbergh also acted as the film's cinematographer and editor, both of which were credited under pseudonyms.

The sex scenes were filmed on a closed set with only George Clooney, Natascha McElhone and Steven Soderbergh, who used a hand-held camera.

== Release ==
=== Rating ===
A few weeks prior to the film's release, in early November 2002, the Motion Picture Association of America assigned the film an R rating primarily due to two scenes that depicted Clooney's naked backside. This caused an outburst among filmmakers against the MPAA and Directors Guild of America, and Soderbergh appealed, stating that similar content had been broadcast on network television. Twelve days prior to the film's release, an appeals board overturned the R-rating for a PG-13 rating.

=== Box office ===
Released on November 27, 2002, Solaris grossed $14,973,382 at the North American box office and $15,029,376 in other territories, against an estimated $47 million budget. Because of the film's poor box office, blame was placed on its marketing campaign that was a challenge from the beginning as Soderbergh expressed on the film's commentary track. Clooney stated that the film's "trailers and commercials [had] nothing to do with the film," depicting more of a science fiction love story (or thriller).

=== Critical response ===
On Rotten Tomatoes the film has an approval rating of 66% based on reviews from 210 critics, with an average score of 6.51/10. The consensus states: "Slow-moving, cerebral, and ambiguous, Solaris is not a movie for everyone, but it offers intriguing issues to ponder." On Metacritic the film has a score of 65 out of 100 based on 38 reviews, indicating "generally favorable reviews". However, it received a rare grade of "F" from CinemaScore, based on moviegoers' survey responses.

The Time Out Film Guide describes the film as superior to the Tarkovsky version. The film was a New York Times Critics' Pick, with Stephen Holden saying: "The movie aspires to fuse the mystical intellectual gamesmanship of 2001: A Space Odyssey with the love-beyond-the-grave romantic schmaltz of Titanic, without losing its cool...a tricky balancing act that doesn't quite come off." As Holden notes: "Solaris is a science-fiction film lacking action-adventure sequences. The absence of boyish friskiness, kineticism and pyrotechnics makes it a film that offers no vicarious physical release. Its insistence on remaining cerebral and somber to the end may be a sign of integrity, but it should cost it dearly at the box office."

Roger Ebert gave the film three and a half out of four stars and called it "the kind of smart film that has people arguing about it on their way out of the theater", noting that while it "needs science fiction to supply the planet and the space station, which furnish the premise and concentrate the action,... it is essentially a psychological drama." Ebert concludes with: "When I saw Tarkovsky's original film, I felt absorbed in it, as if it were a sponge. It was slow, mysterious, confusing, and I have never forgotten it. Soderbergh's version is more clean and spare, more easily readable, but it pays full attention to the ideas and doesn't compromise. Tarkovsky was a genius, but one who demanded great patience from his audience as he ponderously marched toward his goals. The Soderbergh version is like the same story freed from the weight of Tarkovsky's solemnity. And it evokes one of the rarest of movie emotions, ironic regret."

=== Other response ===
Soderbergh "said that he didn't intend Solaris to be a remake of Tarkovsky's film but rather a new version of Stanislaw Lem's novel".

While admitting that he had not seen the film, Stanisław Lem criticized what he had heard as departing far from his original intentions by focusing almost exclusively on the psychological relationship between the two main characters, while reducing the vast and alien ocean to a mere "mirror" of humanity:

...to my best knowledge, the book was not dedicated to erotic problems of people in outer space... As Solaris' author I shall allow myself to repeat that I only wanted to create a vision of a human encounter with something that certainly exists, in a mighty manner perhaps, but cannot be reduced to human concepts, ideas or images. This is why the book was entitled Solaris and not Love in Outer Space.

— Stanislaw Lem, The Solaris Station (December 8, 2002)

=== Accolades ===
Award	Date of ceremony	Category	Recipient(s)	Result	Ref.
Berlin International Film Festival	February 2003	Golden Bear	Solaris	Nominated	
Black Reel Awards	March 2, 2003	Best Supporting Actress	Viola Davis	Nominated	
IFTA Film & Drama Awards	2003	Best Actress in a Film	Natascha McElhone	Nominated	
Satellite Awards	January 12, 2003	Best Sound	Larry Blake	Won	
Satellite Awards	January 12, 2003	Best Actor in a Supporting Role	Jeremy Davies	Nominated	
Saturn Awards	May 18, 2003	Best Actor	George Clooney	Nominated	
Saturn Awards	May 18, 2003	Best Actress	Natascha McElhone	Nominated	
Saturn Awards	May 18, 2003	Best Science Fiction Film	Solaris	Nominated	
Washington D.C. Area Film Critics Association	December 30, 2002	Biggest Disappointment	Solaris	Won	

In 2010, Solaris made Time magazine's "Top 10 Hollywood Remakes" list, saying it was "expertly and exquisitely executed" and "manages to extract that all too rare achievement from a sci-fi film: emotion."

== Soundtrack ==
Solaris

Soundtrack album by Cliff Martinez
- Released: 2002
- Genres: Soundtracks; Film music
- Length: 43.45
- Label: La-La Land Records

The score was composed by Cliff Martinez in 2002 and first released by Superb Records on compact disc in 2002. After being out of print, it was re-released in a remastered edition in January 2011 by La-La Land Records. The soundtrack was praised by the BBC Music's Chris Jones as a "...brooding slow, meditative work".

Six vinyl versions of the soundtrack were later released by Invada Records. The first repress was introduced in 2013 on black vinyl, white vinyl, and picture disc. The second in 2017 on "Cosmic Coloured" vinyl, "Crystal Clear Vinyl With Heavy White Splatter" vinyl, and a new picture disc version.

== See also ==
- List of films featuring space stations
- Ocean planet
