= BD+14 4559 b =

Gas giant exoplanet in the habitable zone

BD+14 4559b / Pirx
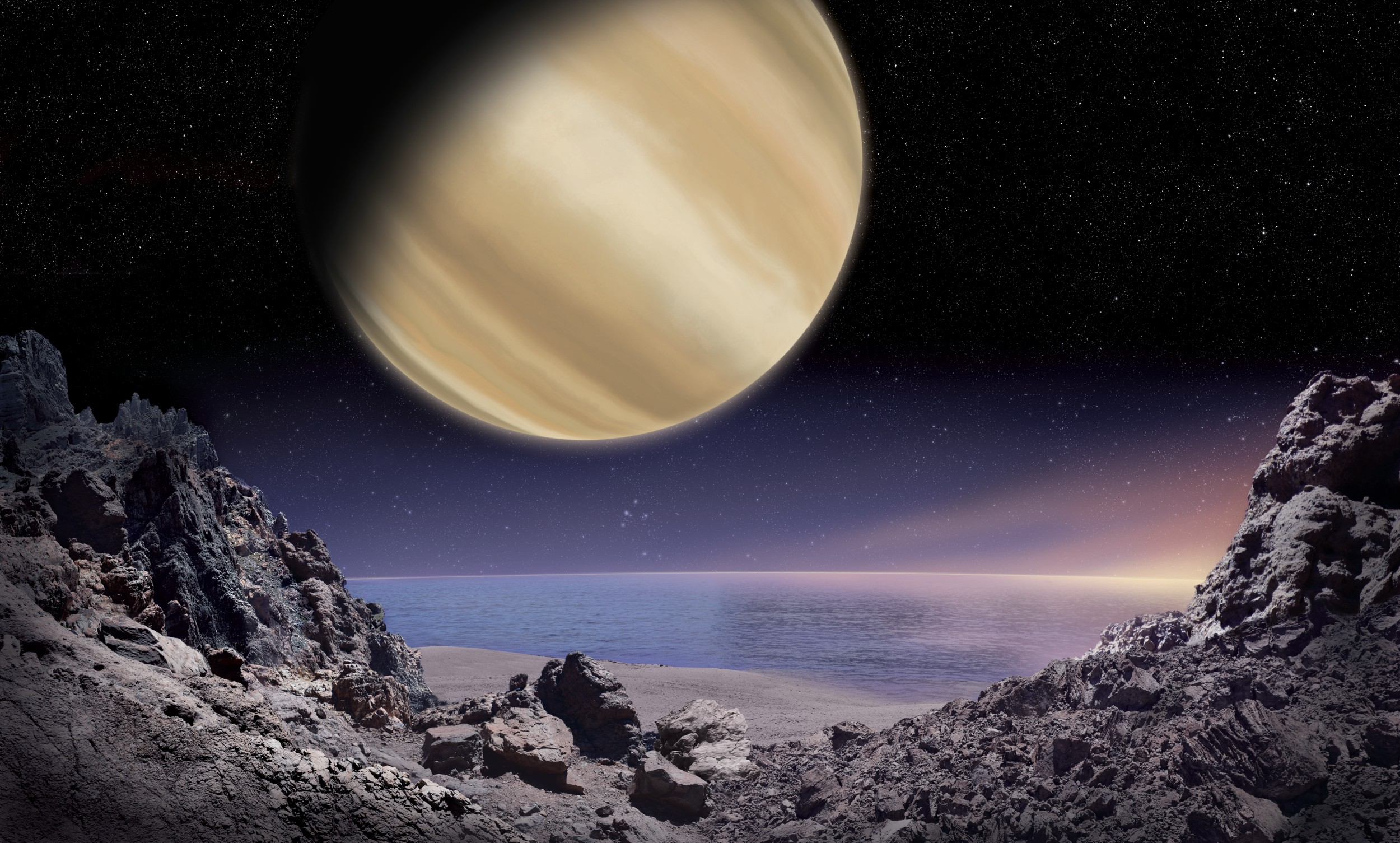
- Artist's impression of the exoplanet BD+14 4599 b. View from the surface of a hypothetical moon.

Discovery
- Discovered by: Andrzej Niedzielski,Grzegorz Nowak, Monika Adamów i Aleksander Wolszczan
- Discovery site: La Silla Observatory
- Discovery date: June 10, 2009
- Detection method: radial velocity

Orbital characteristics
- Apastron: 1.002 AU (149,900,000 km)
- Periastron: 0.552 AU (82,600,000 km)
- Semi-major axis: 0.777 AU (116,200,000 km)
- Eccentricity: 0.29 ± 0.03
- Orbital period (sidereal): 268.94 ± 0.99 d
- Time of periastron: 53293.71 ± 6.35
- Argument of periastron: 87.64 ± 7.87

Physical characteristics
- Mean radius: ~1.05 R_{J}
- Temperature: 205 K (−68 °C; −91 °F)

BD+14 4559 b, named Pirx, is an exoplanet orbiting the K-type main sequence star BD+14 4559 about 161 light-years (49 parsecs, or nearly 1.5×10^{15} km) from Earth in the constellation Pegasus. It orbits its star within the habitable zone at a distance of 0.777 AU, close to that of Venus, but its star is less energetic, thus its habitable zone is closer to it than that of the Sun's. The exoplanet was found by using the radial velocity method, from radial-velocity measurements via observation of Doppler shifts in the spectrum of the planet's parent star.

The planet was named during the NameExoWorlds campaign by Poland. Pilot Pirx is a fictional character from stories by Polish science-fiction writer Stanisław Lem.

== Characteristics ==
=== Mass, radius and temperature ===
BD+14 4559 b is a gas giant, an exoplanet that has a radius and mass around that of the gas giants Jupiter and Saturn. It has a temperature of 205 K (−68 °C; −91 °F). It has an estimated mass of around 1.2 M_{J} and a potential radius of around 1.05 R_{J} based on its mass.

=== Host star ===
The planet orbits a (K-type) star named BD+14 4559. The star has a mass of 0.86 M_{☉} and a radius of around 0.95 R_{☉}. It has a surface temperature of 5008 K and is likely about 3 billion years old based on its evolution and mass. In comparison, the Sun is about 4.6 billion years old and has a surface temperature of 5778 K.

The star's apparent magnitude, or how bright it appears from Earth's perspective, is 9.63. Therefore, BD+14 4559 is too dim to be seen with the naked eye, but can be viewed using good binoculars.

=== Orbit ===
BD+14 4559 b orbits its star every 268 days at a distance of 0.77 AU (close to Venus's orbital distance from the Sun, which is 0.72 AU). It has a mildly eccentric orbit, with an eccentricity of 0.29.

== Discovery ==
The search for BD+14 4559 b started when its host star was chosen an ideal target for a planet search using the radial velocity method (in which the gravitational pull of a planet on its star is measured by observing the resulting Doppler shift), as stellar activity would not overly mask or mimic Doppler spectroscopy measurements. It was also confirmed that BD+14 4559 is neither a binary star nor a quickly rotating star, common false positives when searching for transiting planets. Analysis of the resulting data found that the radial velocity variations most likely indicated the existence of a planet. The net result was an estimate of a 1.47 M_{J} planetary companion orbiting the star at a distance of 0.77 AU with an eccentricity of 0.29.

Radial velocity measurements of BD+14 4559 were measured at 43 epochs over the period of roughly 1,265 days (around 4 years) using the Hobby–Eberly Telescope. Measurements determined that a signal-to-noise ratio per resolution element was around 150–260 at 594 nm in 10 to 25 minutes of integration. The estimated mean RV uncertainty for the parent star was estimated at 8 m s^{−1}.

The discovery of BD+14 4559 b was reported in the journal The Astrophysical Journal on June 10, 2009.

== See also ==
- BD+20°2457 b
- BD+20°2457 c
- HD 240210 b
