= Solaris (2019 play) =

2019 science fiction play by David Greig based on the 1961 novel

- Original language: English
- Written by: David Greig
- Genre: Science fiction
- Setting: Space station

Premiere
- Date: 3 July 2019
- Place: Malthouse Theatre, Melbourne

Solaris is a 2019 science fiction play based on the 1961 novel of the same name by Stanisław Lem, adapted for the stage by David Greig. Its notable feature is different gender of the protagonist, as well as gender-balanced spaceship crew, combating the science fiction male-dominated cliche.

== Production history ==
Solaris has been adapted for the stage by Scottish playwright David Greig, based on the 1961 novel of the same name by Stanisław Lem.

The play is directed by Matthew Lutton, with lighting design by Paul Jackson.

For the production the gender of Dr Kris Kelvin was changed from male to female, with Greig stating that he was modernising the characters and that they could be any gender or background.

On 3 September 2018, it was announced the play would receive its world premiere the following year and would begin previews at the Malthouse Theatre, Melbourne on 28 June 2019, with an official opening night on 3 July.

Following the run at the Malthouse Theatre (June 28-July 21, 2019), the play was transferred to the Royal Lyceum Theatre (September 12-October 5, 2019), Edinburgh with whom it is a co-production.

On 27 February 2022, the play received its North American premiere production at Raven Theatre in Chicago.

On 3 February 2023, a Romanian language adaptation (by Andrei Dósa) of the play premiered in Bucharest at the Excelsior Theater, under the direction of Bobi Pricop.

On 1 September 2023, a Finnish language adaptation (by Aleksi Milonoff) of the play premiered in the Turku City Theatre.

== See also ==
- Other plays based on Solaris
