= Solarium =

Solarium may refer to:

- A sunroom, a room built largely of glass to afford exposure to the sun
- A terrace (building) or flat housetop
- The Solarium Augusti, a monumental meridian line (or perhaps a sundial) erected in Rome by Emperor Augustus
- A tanning bed or tanning booth, non-medical devices that emit ultraviolet light for the purpose of creating a cosmetic tanning of the skin
- Solarium (constellation), a former constellation
- Solarium (myrmecology), an earthen structure constructed by certain ants for the purpose of brood incubation
- Solarium, a PHP client for interacting with Apache Solr
- Project Solarium, an Eisenhower administration initiative to analyze policy towards the Soviet Union
- Cyberspace Solarium Commission, which works to establish policy solutions to prevent and prepare against cyber attacks.

== See also ==
- Solaria (disambiguation)
