= Solaire =

Solaire may refer to:

- Solaire of Astora, a Dark Souls video game character
- Solaire Resort & Casino, a resort and casino in Metro Manila
- The Solaire, a Battery Park City high-rise building
- Solar (in french)
