= Solaria =

Solaria may refer to:

- Solaria (fictional planet), a fictional planet in Isaac Asimov's novel The Naked Sun
- Solaria (magazine), an Italian literary magazine 1926–1936
- Solaria (plant), a genus of South American plants
- Solaria, a fictional planet in Winx Club

== See also ==
- Solarium (disambiguation)
- Solar (disambiguation)
- Solarian
