= Soler =

Soler may refer to:

== People with the surname Soler ==
=== Arts and entertainment ===
- Álvaro Soler (born 1991), Spanish singer-songwriter
- Amalia Domingo Soler (1835–1909), Spanish writer
- Andrés Soler (1898–1969), Mexican actor
- Antonio Soler (composer) (1729–1783), Spanish baroque/classical era composer usually known as Padre ('Father') Antonio Soler
- Antonio Soler (novelist) (born 1956), Spanish novelist, screenwriter and journalist
- Domingo Soler (1901–1961), Mexican actor
- Fernando Soler (1896–1979), Mexican film actor and film director
- Francisco Gabilondo Soler (1907–1990), also known as Cri-Cri, Mexican composer and performer of children songs
- José María Soler (1929–2009), better known as Víctor Israel, Spanish film actor
- Juan Soler (actor) (born 1966), Argentine-Mexican actor
- Julián Soler (1907–1977), Mexican actor and film director
- Pastora Soler, stage name of Pilar Sánchez Luque (born 1978), Spanish singer
- Rebecca Soler, American voice actress
- Toti Soler, stage name of Jordi Soler i Galí (born 1949), Spanish guitarist, singer, and composer
- Vicente Martín y Soler (1754–1806), Spanish composer of opera and ballet

=== Sports ===
- Alay Soler (born 1979), Cuban baseball player for the New York Mets
- Alexandra Soler (born 1983), French artistic gymnast
- Angelino Soler (born 1939), Spanish professional road bicycle racer
- Carlos Soler (footballer) (born 1997), Spanish footballer
- Francesc Fàbregas Soler (born 1987), Spanish footballer
- Gérard Soler (born 1954), French-Moroccan footballer
- Giselle Soler (born 1997), Argentinian artistic roller skater
- Joan Soler (footballer) (1881-1961), Spanish footballer
- Jorge Soler (born 1992), Cuban baseball player
- Jorge Soler (gymnast), Argentine gymnast
- José Maria Soler (mountaineer) (1893–1971), Spanish agronomist and mountaineer
- Marc Soler (born 1993), Spanish cyclist
- Mauricio Soler (born 1983), Colombian professional road bicycle racer
- Miquel Soler (born 1965), Spanish football player and coach
- Placido Soler Bordas (1903–1964), Spanish chess player
- Yolanda Soler (born 1972), Spanish judoka

=== Others ===
- Antonio Soler (novelist) (born 1956), Spanish novelist
- Jaume Obrador Soler (1940–2025), Spanish social activist
- José María Soler García (1905–1996), Spanish archaeologist, historian, researcher, and folklorist
- Joan Soler i Amigó (1941-1922), Spanish writer and teacher
- Mariano Soler (1846–1908), Uruguayan cleric and theologian
- Miguel Estanislao Soler (1783–1849), Argentine general
- Sílvia Soler (born 1961), Spanish writer and journalist

== Other uses ==
- Soler., taxonomic author abbreviation of Hans Solereder (1860–1920), German botanist
- Soler Township, Roseau County, Minnesota
- Soler (band), Hong Kong–based rock band
- Soler (grape), French wine grape, also known as Peloursin

== See also ==
- Solar (disambiguation)
