= Solaris (1968 film) =

1968 Soviet Union television film

- Solaris (1968), the 2009 DVD release cover
- Солярис
- Based on: Solaris by Stanisław Lem
- Written by: Nikolay Kemasky
- Directed by: Boris Nirenburg; Lidiya Ishimbayeva
- Starring: Vasily Lanovoy; Vladimir Etush; Viktor Zozulin; Antonina Pilyus
- Music by: A. Kliot
- Country of origin: Soviet Union
- Original language: Russian

Production
- Cinematography: Yuri Bouguenais; Boris Cypress; Valery Revitch
- Editor: G. Engeeva
- Running time: 143 minutes
- Production company: Central Television Studio

Original release
- Release: 1968

Solaris (Russian: Солярис, tr. Solyaris) is a two-part 1968 Soviet television play in black-and-white based on the 1961 novel Solaris by Stanisław Lem. It was the first film adaptation of the novel.

It was first aired on Channel 1 of the Soviet Central Television on October 8–9, 1968, with repeat on October 10–11, 1968.

On January 29, 2009 the film was released on DVD (in Russian).

On 14 April 2019 the film was shown under the title Solyaris at the Barbican Centre in London (as part of the Stanislaw Lem on Film series within the Kinoteka festival of Polish film) with English subtitles commissioned for the screening that were composited over the film live by the translator.

== Plot ==
Dr. Kris Kelvin arrives on Solaris Station, a space station orbiting the ocean planet of Solaris. The scientists there have been studying the planet and its ocean for many decades. Shortly before Kelvin's arrival, the crew exposed the ocean to a high-energy gamma-ray bombardment. The ocean's response tests the scientists' minds by confronting them with their most painful thoughts and memories. The ocean does this by materializing physical human simulacra. Kelvin confronts memories of his dead lover and guilt about her suicide. The torments of the other researchers are only suggested, but seem even worse than Kelvin's personal ordeal. The ocean's intelligence expresses physical phenomena in ways difficult for their limited science to explain, deeply upsetting the scientists. The alien mind of Solaris appears to differ so much from the human mind that communication doesn't seem possible.

In a final experiment, Snaut and Sartorius record Kelvin's brain waves and beam them at Solaris. Unknown to Snaut and Sartorius, Kelvin, while his brain waves are being recorded, wishes that Kelvin and Snaut's visitors disappear but Harey stays. Kelvin tells the crew that he and Harey are to return to Earth. However, Snaut talks to Harey in private and says that she will not be allowed on Earth and would not make it anyway since she only exists because of the energy directed at the space station by Solaris. The night before Kelvin and Harey are due to leave, Harey tricks Kelvin into taking a sleeping draught and while he is asleep writes a second suicide note to him, then goes to Snaut and Sartorius who have built a machine to cancel out the effects of Solaris making the visitors disappear. Harey asks them what it will be like, Snaut says it 'will be like a flash and breath of wind'. Harey is gone, the visitors do not return and the three scientists agree to stay on the station.

== Cast ==
- Vasily Lanovoy as Dr. Kris Kelvin
- Vladimir Etush as Dr. Snaut
- Viktor Zozulin as Dr. Sartorius
- Antonina Pilyus as Harey

== See also ==
- List of films featuring space stations
