= Solar (name) =

Solar is a surname. Notable people with the surname include:

- Amelia Solar de Claro (1836–1915), Chilean poet, playwright and essayist
- C.J. Solar (born 1992), American musician
- Cristóbal del Solar (born 1993), Chilean golf player
- El Solar, (born 1956), masked Mexican professional wrestler
- Gabriela Pérez del Solar (born 1968), Peruvian former volleyball player and politician
- José del Solar (born 1967), Peruvian football player
- Lola Solar (1904–1989), Austrian teacher and politician
- Martín Solar (born 2000), Spanish football player
- Nicanor González del Solar (born 1943), Argentine sports journalist and former rugby union player
- Xul Solar (1887–1963), Argentine artist
