= Solaris (fictional planet) =

Planetary life-form conceived by sci-fi writer Stanisław Lem

- First appearance: Solaris (1961)
- Created by: Stanisław Lem
- Genre: Science fiction

In-universe information
- Type: Living planet

Solaris is a fictional living planet, an extraterrestrial life form, believed to be sentient by the researchers. It was depicted in the 1961 science fiction novel Solaris by Polish writer Stanisław Lem and its subsequent adaptations into other forms of media.

== Description ==
Solaris is an exoplanet consisting of a vast, seven-hundred-billion-ton "colloidal envelope" stretching across the entire planet's surface. It regularly forms numerous transient structures, such as continent-wide crystalline "symmetriads" that dissipate just as quickly as they form, which have been catalogued by scientists on the orbiting space station Prometheus. Coming to believe it is sentient, they have attempted to study it for over 100 years, creating the scientific discipline of Solaristics. However, their attempts to establish first contact are met with nothing, and the scientists, assuming that it surely would want to communicate with them if it was able to, begin to claim the planet is unintelligent and dying in response to its lack of interest in their advances.

Solaris begins creating duplicates of people from the crew's memories known as Phi-creatures in response to an X-ray bombardment, forcing them to reckon with their psychological trauma, though whether Solaris itself understands the import of these beings is uncertain. The protagonist, Dr. Kris Kelvin, eventually sheds his anthropocentric values and visits the planet's surface to establish true contact, realizing Solaris' nature and deciding to remain on the planet to continue studying it.

== Reception ==
The depiction of Solaris was praised by critics as a rare example of non-anthropomorphic alien contact in fiction—a creature that does not act, or even think in a way that humans can understand. Lem criticized the 2002 film adaptation for focusing mostly on the human characters' relationships, saying that he named the novel "Solaris" rather than "Love in Space" because the main focus was the planet. He clarified that he deliberately chose to make the sentient alien to be an ocean to avoid any personification and the pitfalls of anthropomorphism in depicting first contact.

In Worlds Apart, Carl D. Malmgren calls Solaris "one of the strangest novums that Lem has created and 'investigated'." Saying that "there should be no real debate" that Solaris is in fact sentient, he describes it as "Otherness on a grand scale". Calling it "unfathomable" with "invariably strange 'behavior'", he cites Mark Rose as calling it "the most radical [...] late treatment of the alien-contact theme". Describing it as "an alien encounter in the most extreme form", he explains that even more than Solaris itself, the story is focused on Solaristics and the limits of human scientific cognition.

Despite clarifying that Solaris is not technically an ocean, he calls the term an "appropriate and suggestive" name given humans' tendency to anthropomorphize the ocean on Earth despite its otherness. The scientists' observations on the planet are colored by subjectivity, and are often conflicting. At various points in the novel, the Phi-creatures are called a malicious form of torture, an accidental creation, or a purposeful gift to fulfill the crew's desires. In the end, Kelvin is only able to achieve contact when he becomes a blank slate.

Sad Planets describes Solaris as an "enigma", calling some of the book's most moving passages those that describe the planet itself, with no human presence. Green Planets states that Solaris "resists both physical and epistemic human penetration", describing it as "an impervious mirror surface". Ironically, the planet itself appears to experiment on the scientists by reading their thoughts and creating the Phi-creatures.

In 2022, a group of scientists cited the planet Solaris in a study that stated that such superorganism worlds might be the norm, with planets containing individual creatures like Earth—where symbiosis between organisms took billions of years to develop - being the exception to the rule.

== See also ==
- BD+14 4559, a star named Solaris
- Gaia hypothesis
