= Solaris (synchrotron) =

Synchrotron light source in Kraków, Poland

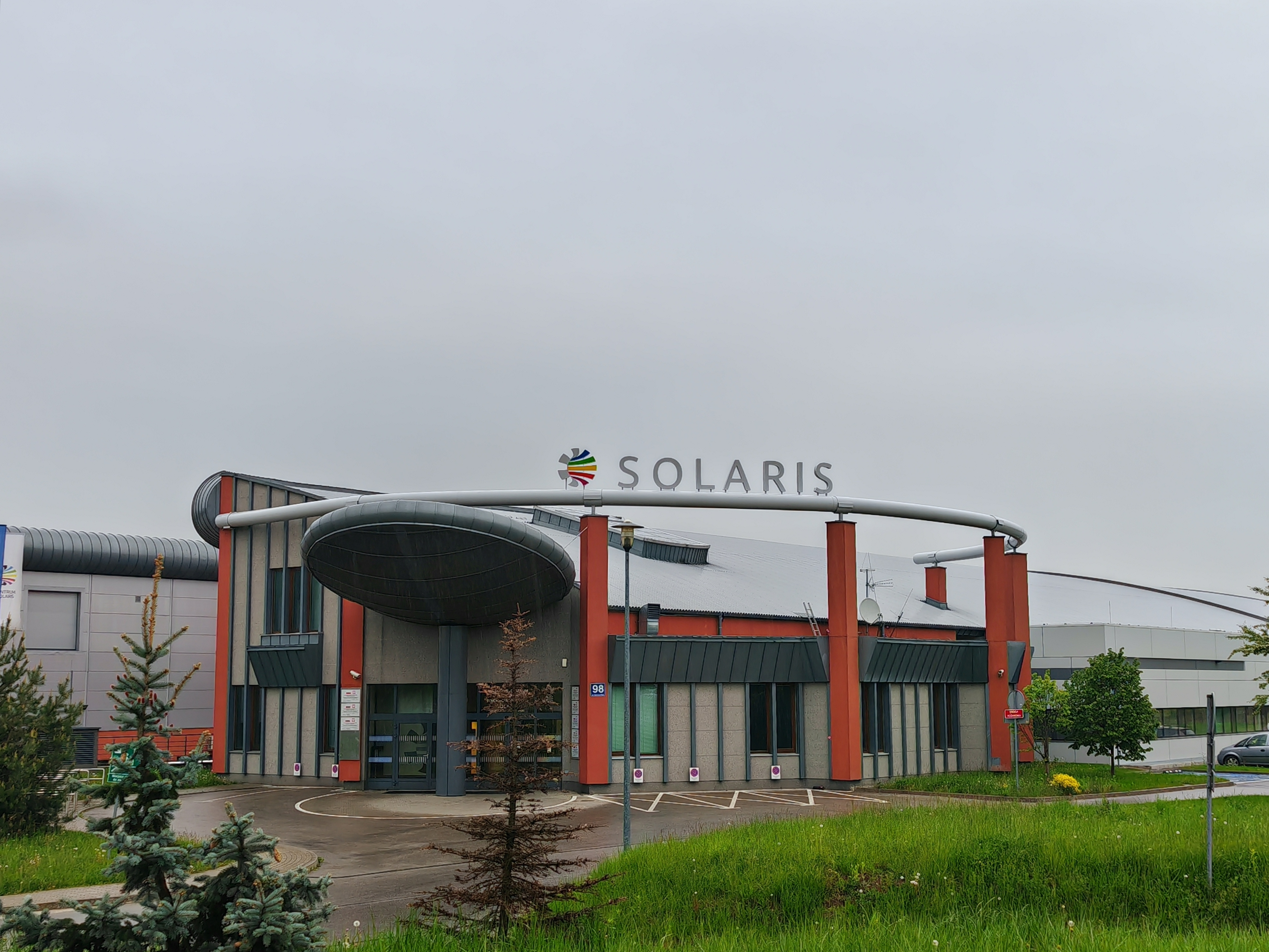

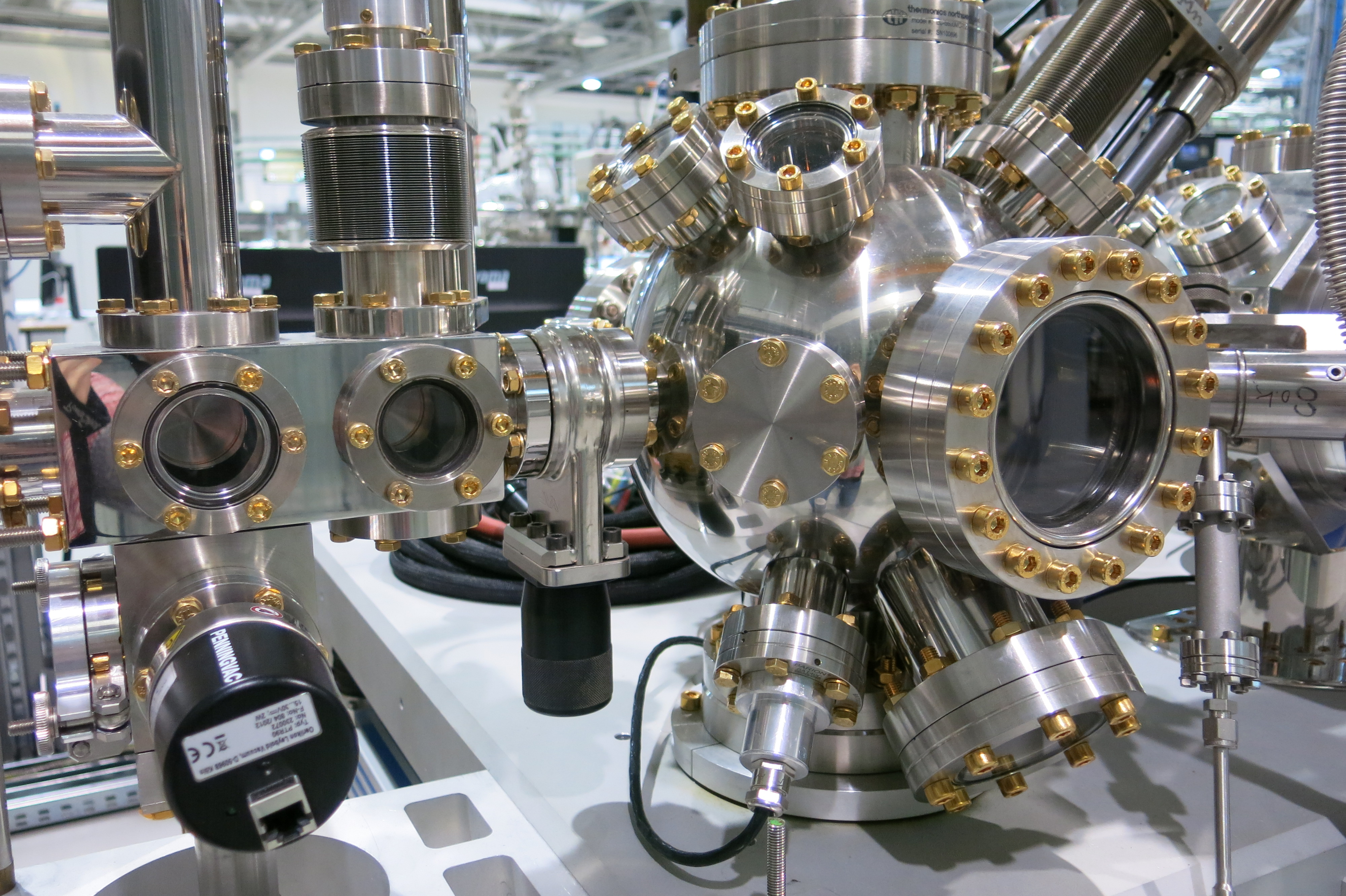
Part of SOLARIS beamline

SOLARIS is a synchrotron light source in the city of Kraków in Poland. It is the only one facility of its kind in Central-Eastern Europe. Built in 2015, under the auspices of the Jagiellonian University, it is located on the Campus of the 600th Anniversary of the Jagiellonian University Revival, in the southern part of the city. It is the central facility of the National Synchrotron Radiation Centre SOLARIS (Polish: Narodowe Centrum Promieniowania Synchrotronowego SOLARIS).

The National Synchrotron Radiation Center SOLARIS was built between 2011 and 2014. The investment was co-financed by the European Union with funds from the European Regional Development Fund, as part of the Innovative Economy Operational Program for 2007–2013.

The SOLARIS synchrotron began operation with two beamlines (PIRX [PEEM/XAS] with two end-stations, and URANOS [UARPES] with one end-station). Ultimately, however, the experimental hall of the Kraków accelerator will house dozens of them. In total, the beamlines will be fitted with about twenty end-stations.

The facility is named after the title of a novel by Polish science fiction writer Stanislaw Lem, who lived and worked in Kraków.

On March 1, 2019, at the First Congress of the Cryomicroscopy Consortium, a body gathering specialists in structural biology from all over Poland, an official decision was made to open the National Center for Electron Cryomicroscopy at SOLARIS. The heart of the Cryomicroscopy Center consists of two cryomicroscopes of the latest generation which, due to their high resolution and measurement method, revolutionize structural biology.

== Research ==
The SOLARIS Center is open for all interested scientists, both from Poland and abroad. Calls for proposals are announced twice a year (in spring and autumn). The access to the infrastructure for scientists is free of charge.

== Beamlines ==
There are several beamlines.

=== Active beamlines ===
- PIRX (Premiere InstRument for Xas) – a research beamline utilizing synchrotron radiation emitted by a bending magnet. The beamline is dedicated to spectroscopic and microscopic measurements in the soft X-ray range (100–2000 eV). The technique makes use of resonant X-ray absorption phenomena, X-ray natural linear dichroism (XNLD), X-ray magnetic circular dichroism (XMCD), and X-ray magnetic linear dichroism (XMLD). The beamline is applied in a wide range of studies, such as investigations of the magnetic properties of materials, superconductors, thin films, as well as in materials science, surface physics, and studies of doped materials.
- URANOS (Ultra Resolved ANgular phOtoelectron Spectroscopy, formerly UARPES) is a beamline dedicated to photoelectron spectroscopy in the vacuum ultraviolet range (8–170 eV). The primary research techniques are angle-resolved photoemission spectroscopy (ARPES) and spin-resolved photoemission spectroscopy (Spin-ARPES, SRPES). Additional techniques available include soft X-ray photoemission spectroscopy (up to 500 eV) and low-energy electron diffraction (LEED). ARPES and Spin-ARPES enable the measurement of three fundamental electron parameters: energy, momentum, and spin, providing a complete description of the electronic structure of condensed matter. Moreover ARPES gives also detailed insights into complex electron – electron and electron – lattice interactions, dynamic of quasiparticles in the solid. These techniques are applied in studies of novel materials for electronics, two-dimensional (2D) materials, topological materials, transition metal dichalcogenides (TMDs), optoelectronic and photonic materials, as well as in the physics of superconductors and semiconductors.
- PHELIX – the beamline is using soft X-rays produced by an APPLE II undulator . The beamline is designed for experiments with ultra-high vacuum Photoelectron Spectroscopy (PES) and X-ray Absorption Spectroscopy (XAS) in the soft X-ray range. The soft X-ray PES and XAS end station aims to study the electronic structure of various materials, ranging from highly ordered crystalline solids to amorphous phases like ceramics, glass, or minerals. The wide range of available techniques makes this end station a powerful and unique tool for studying very complex systems. PES experiments can be conducted using Angle Resolved Photoelectron Spectroscopy (ARPES), Circular Dichroism-ARPES, Spin-ARPES, and XPS. The SPECS PHOIBOS 225 energy analyzer with a deflector system and CMOS camera allows for collecting photoemission data with an energy resolution of 2 meV and an angular resolution of 0.1°. Absorption spectra can be obtained using Total Electron Yield (TEY), Total Fluorescence Yield (TFY), and Partial Electron Yield (PEY). The PHELIX end station includes an MBE chamber capable of evaporating Fe, Co, and Sn, with the option to install additional evaporation sources. The preparation chambers enable sample preparation in a wide temperature range from 120 K to 2000 K.
- DEMETER – (Dual Microscopy and Electron Spectroscopy Beamline) – the beamline is using soft X-rays with variable polarization emitted by an EPU (elliptically polarizing undulator). The beamline has two end stations: a scanning transmission X-ray microscope (STXM) and a photoemission electron microscope (PEEM). Application: magnetic order research, domain structure research, imaging of chemical composition and spectroscopy of biomolecules.
- ASTRA (previously SOLABS) – an X-ray absorption spectroscopy beamline, whose synchrotron light source will be a bending magnet. The beamline will deliver photons within a broad energy range, allowing measurements to be conducted at the absorption edges of many elements. Applications: The endstation will be intended for materials research of both a basic and applied nature.
- CIRI (previously SOLAIR) – a beamline for infrared absorption microscopy with imaging. The source of radiation is a bending magnet. The beamline will have two end stations: a Fourier-transform infrared spectroscopy microscope and a microscope for nano-infrared spectroscopy coupled with atomic force microscopy and scanning near-field microscopy (AFM-SNOM-FTIR imaging). Application: in biomedicine, nanotechnology, environmental sciences and many other fields. The planned research will allow, among other things, to direct the synthesis of potential drugs and their design.
- POLYX – a beamline which will enable high-resolution multi-modal imaging in the hard X-ray range. The source of radiation is a bending magnet. Techniques available will be: X-ray fluorescence microanalysis (micro-XRF), X-ray absorption threshold spectroscopy (micro-XAFS) and computed micro-tomography (micro-CT). Application: testing new solutions for X-ray optics and detectors, testing low-absorbing samples, e.g. biological materials, obtaining depth information about elemental decomposition, morphological studies of objects, three-dimensional imaging of the local atomic structure, etc.

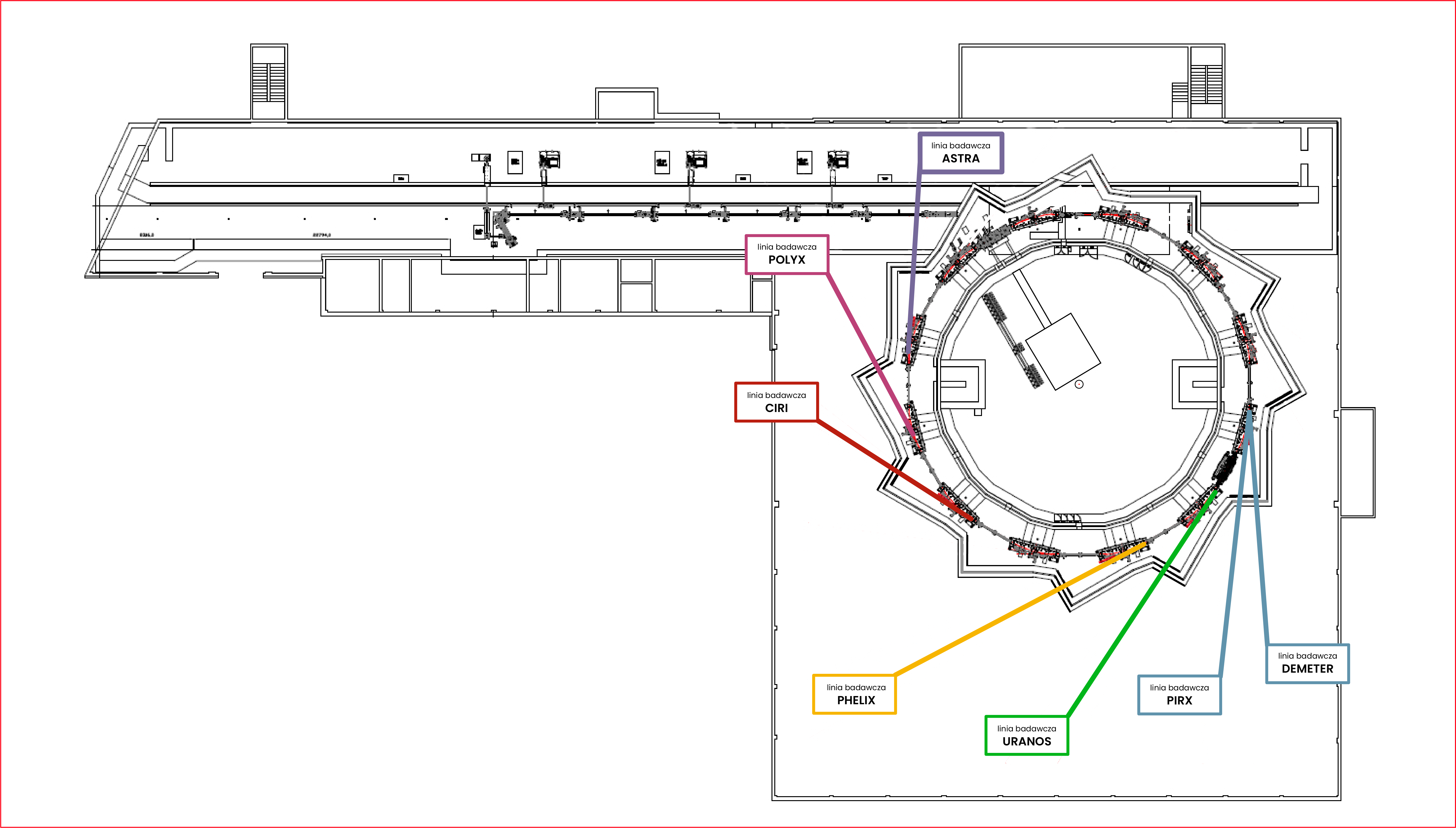
SOLARIS synchrotron scheme with working beamlines 2023

=== Beamlines under construction ===
- SMAUG – (Small Angle X-ray Scattering) beamline is a bending magnet-based beamline operating in the energy range from 6 to 15 keV. The end station's planned research capabilities will offer measurements in the following techniques: bioSAXS (studying biological systems in solution), SEC-SAXS (combining SAXS studies with simultaneous chromatographic separation), static SAXS measurements (including tests at low and high temperatures and in magnetic or electric fields) and SAXS measurements of liquid samples at high pressures. The end station will operate using a laboratory X-ray source from 2025 and the planned connection to synchrotron is scheduled for 2027.
- ARYA – formerly part of the SOLCRYS project – is a research beamline for structural studies, which will use X-ray radiation from a three-pole wiggler to investigate the structure of proteins, nucleic acids, and small molecules under various conditions (room temperature, cryogenic temperatures, elevated pressure). Applications include structural biology, chemistry, pharmacology, and many other fields. The construction of the beamline is scheduled to be completed by the end of 2027.

== Parameters ==
The SOLARIS storage ring main parameters:

- Energy: 1.5 GeV
- Max. current: 500 mA
- Circumference: 96 m
- Main RF frequency: 99,93 MHz
- Max. number of circulating bunches: 32
- Horizontal emittance (without insertion devices): 6 nm rad
- Coupling: 1%
- Tune Qx, Qy: 11.22; 3.15
- Natural chromaticity ξx, ξy: −22.96, −17.14
- Corrected chromaticity ξx, ξy: +1, +1
- Electron beam size (straight section center) σx, σy: 184 μm, 13 μm
- Electron beam size (dipole center) σx, σy: 44 μm, 30 μm
- Max. number of insertion devices: 10
- Momentum compaction: 3.055 x 10–3
- Total lifetime of electrons: 13 h
