= Alexander Varbedian =

Alexandre (Arordi) Varbedian (born June 11, 1943, in Marseille, France) is a French-Armenian Armenologist, ethnologist, essentialist and ontologist.

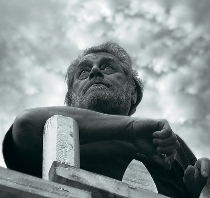
Alexandre Arordi Varbedian

== Early life ==
Varbedian was born in a family with roots from Khoy and Sasun-Bitlis and re-emigrated into Armenia in 1948. In 1968 he graduated from Architectural Department of the Yerevan Polytechnic Institute; and in 1970 from the actor department of studio "Hayfilm". In 1975 after moving back to Marseille he continued his professional activities as an architect, and his ethnological activities as a producer, writer, public speaker, but primarily as an Armenologist, ethnologist and essentialist.

Mr. Varbetian is a recipient of national and international awards in the first three fields mentioned above.

== Works ==
Mr. Varbedian has written for around 50 Armenian, Diaspora and foreign periodicals, he was editor of the London based biweekly "Erebuni" (1987), the first issue of the ethnological journal "Eutyun" (lit. Essence) (Yerevan – 1992). He founded and led the French-Armenian theatrical group "Arvestanoc Sevak" (1978–1981, award winner of JAF-80 Paris Festival). He was founder of the Diaspora "Haratevman Ukht" union (1986–1990) and the expanded form of that organization with involvement well-known members of the Armenian intelligentsia. He was also founder of "Eutyun" – Temple of National Wisdom (Armenia, since 1990).

He had presentations, radio and television programs and numerous activities in Armenia, in almost all centers of the Diaspora and in foreign universities. And the main theme of all those is the eternity of the Armenian nation, the programming and disclosure of its main patterns, the presentation and indoctrination of the importance of a national identity.

=== Publications ===
He authored:

- The lyrics Solarius, dedicated to the destiny of the Armenian nation (Marseille, 1985, formerly a movie script).
- Armenological study, Who are finally the Aryans? (Marseille, 1988, Yerevan, 1990).
- Volume of poems titled Evocation (Yerevan, 1990).
- An exploratory collection titled Identity (Yerevan, 1993).
- Theory of Essence (Yerevan, 1995).
- National ideological study titled Aryagank (Yerevan, 1997).
- A study titled Genesis-Aya (Ծննդոց՝ ԱՅԱ, his magnum opus narrates the 12,000 year history of the Armenian nation and the beginnings of the present Human Civilization in the highlands of Armenia (Yerevan, 2000 second edition: Yerevan, 2003), ISBN 99930-858-0-4
- The millennium program Eagank ("Nation and New Millennium", volume 1, Yerevan, 2002).
- Public article titled National Crossword or who Alexandre Arordi Varbetian Is Disturbing? (Yerevan, 2003).
- Qualitas (Yerevan, 2004).
- The collections of aphorisms Tombstone (Yerevan, 2005).
- The Letter E Name of AY ("Revelation", Eagank volume 2, Yerevan, 2006).
- Dispelling the mystery of Delphic E'i (Part I, Yerevan-1993).
- What Plato did not know? (Part II, Yerevan, 2011).
- The enigma of 27 October (Los Angeles, 2013).
- As long as Kashchey the Deathless is alive (Los Angeles, 2015).

see also: Kashchey the Deathless

- And know thing of my... (Anthology of works, Yerevan, 2015)
- AXIS MUNDI - The enigma of Gobekli Tepe (in English & in Armenian, Yerevan-2016 ).

== Reception ==
His works were recognized by Garzu, S. Paradjanov, M. Ragon, A. Terterian, C. Paren, H. Shiraz, H. Sahyan, academicians such as Victor Hambardzumyan, V. Ivanov, S. Yeremyan and about sixty other Armenian and foreign famous individuals. British-Armenian producer H. Pilikyan labeled him as "genius Armenian ambassador with diapason of Shakespeare,". Late Vahe Oshakan referred him as "one of very few imaginative, precious and courageous parts of Armenian history". Armenian academician Varazdad Haroutyunyan praised him as a "national phenomenon" (in the section devoted to Varbedian of his "My Contemporaries" volume) and others as "the next representative of the Armenian Ideology after R. Patkanyan, H. Asatryan and Garegin Nzhdeh".

Sevak Aramazd (Hovanisyan-Germany) is describing him as "presenters of the Armenian Soul jailed in dark caves, the greatest names of a small group of "outstanding thinkers", D. Varujan, K. Zaryan, G. Njdeh and A. Varbetian". Nevertheless, starting from 2002 Alexandre Varbedian's entry to the Motherland is strictly forbidden.

== Quotes ==
...To really live...is to live in harmony with our true divine essence...with the divine spark shining bright from the innermost depth of

our Soul-Spirit...an individual who does not know [Know...Gnosis] and lives his or her life in tune with the quintessential Cosmic Laws will never achieve oneness with our true Self/Source... but will merely exist in an imbalanced, unnatural and unhealthy mode

so, ignorance is not bliss... ignorance is death...

— A.Varbedian

== EIZM ==
Alexandre A. Varbedian is the author of the EIZM (theory of essence or theory of everything).

The Eizm is an essentialistic doctrine, a synthesis of ancient paganistic systems, different currents of religious, philosophical and/or classical concepts various metaphysical or esoteric schools, scientific theories, and cosmological hypotheses. With the Hegelian principle of thesis, antithesis, and synthesis, Materialism and Idealism are also coincident with each other and together, in harmony, they solve the apple of discord of all time, which is «the fundamental question of philosophy»; Materialism as material and idealism as philosophies of immaterial states.

In other words, it is neither theism, nor atheism but simply the Eizm. Hence, if philosophy is the science of all sciences, then Eizm is the philosophy of all philosophies. Generally, it is a new perspective, a complete viewpoint of the universum. Simply put, if philosophy is merely extracted from nature and life experience, then the Eizm is extracted not only from the above-mentioned, but also from the universal acquaintance/ understanding of modern sciences and especially of cosmology.

== Personal life ==
Mr. Varbedian is nonpartisan, has two sons and two grandchildren.
