= Solaris (opera) =

Solaris is a 2012 opera by Detlev Glanert to a libretto by Reinhard Palm, based on the novel by Stanislaw Lem. It was commissioned by and premiered at the Bregenz Festival and revived at Oper Köln in 2014.
