= Solar One =

Solar 1, SOLAR-1, or Solar One is the name of several solar projects including:

== Power plants ==
- Nevada Solar One, third largest concentrated solar power plant in the world
- Solar One, part of The Solar Project, a pilot solar-thermal project built in the Mojave Desert

== Other uses ==
- Solar 1, self-sustaining solar powered building in New York City
- Solar-Powered Aircraft Developments Solar One British solar-powered aircraft
- Space weather Observations at L1 to Advance Readiness - 1 (SOLAR-1), a NOAA space weather monitoring mission
