= BD+14 4559 =

Orange-hued star in the constellation Pegasus

BD+14 4559 / Solaris
Observation data Epoch J2000 Equinox ICRS
- Constellation: Pegasus
- Right ascension: 21^{h} 13^{m} 35.99016^{s}
- Declination: +14° 41′ 21.7858″
- Apparent magnitude (V): 9.78

Characteristics
- Spectral type: K2V
- B−V color index: 1.611±0.218
- V−R color index: 0.68
- R−I color index: 0.50

Astrometry
Radial velocity (R_{v})	−44.41±0.14 km/s
Proper motion (μ)	RA: 233.909 mas/yr Dec.: −0.360 mas/yr
Parallax (π)	20.2837±0.0167 mas
Distance	160.8 ± 0.1 ly (49.30 ± 0.04 pc)
Absolute magnitude (M_{V})	+6.37
Absolute bolometric magnitude (M_{bol})	5.56

Details
Mass	0.82±0.02 M_{☉}
Radius	0.78±0.02 R_{☉}
Luminosity	0.32±0.01 L_{☉}
Surface gravity (log g)	4.57±0.03 cgs
Temperature	4,948±25 K
Metallicity [Fe/H]	0.10±0.07 dex
Age	6.9±4.2 Gyr

Other designations
- Solaris, AG+14 2370, BD+14 4559, HIP 104780, PPM 139779, LTT 16221

Database references
SIMBAD	data
Exoplanet Archive	data

BD+14 4559 is a star with an exoplanetary companion in the northern constellation of Pegasus. During the 2019 NameExoWorlds campaign, the star was named Solaris by Poland after a 1961 science fiction novel about an ocean-covered exoplanet by Polish writer Stanisław Lem. With an apparent visual magnitude of 9.78, the star is too faint to be viewed with the naked eye. The system is located at a distance of 161 light-years from the Sun based on parallax measurements, but is drifting closer with a radial velocity of −44 km/s. It is a high proper motion star, traversing the celestial sphere at an angular rate of 0.234″ yr^{−1}.

This is an ordinary K-type main sequence star with a stellar classification of K2V. The age of the star is poorly constrained, but is estimated to be roughly seven billion years. It has 82% of the mass and 78% of the radius of the Sun. The star is radiating 48% of the net luminosity of the Sun from its photosphere at an effective temperature of 4,948 K. It has a higher metallicity – the abundance of elements of higher atomic number than helium – compared to the Sun.

== Planetary system ==
On 10 June 2009, an exoplanet (Pirx) was found in orbit by Niedzielski et al. using the Hobby-Eberly Telescope. It has a minimum mass of one and a half Jupiter masses (M_{J}). The orbit of this object is highly eccentric and it spends 65% of its orbital period in the star's habitable zone. A 2020 analysis of data from the Gaia mission has set a 3-sigma upper limit to its mass of 49.83 M_{J}. There may be an undetected second planet orbiting the star; however, this is unconfirmed.

The BD+14 4559 planetary system
Companion (in order from star)	Mass	Semimajor axis (AU)	Orbital period (days)	Eccentricity	Inclination (°)	Radius
b / Pirx	>1.52 ± 0.19 M_{J}	0.777	268.94 ± 0.99	0.29 ± 0.03	>1.769	—
c (unconfirmed)	>2.4 M_{J}	>2.3	800?	—	—	—

== See also ==
- BD+20°2457
- HD 240210
- List of extrasolar planets
