= Mickiewicz (crater) =

Crater on Mercury

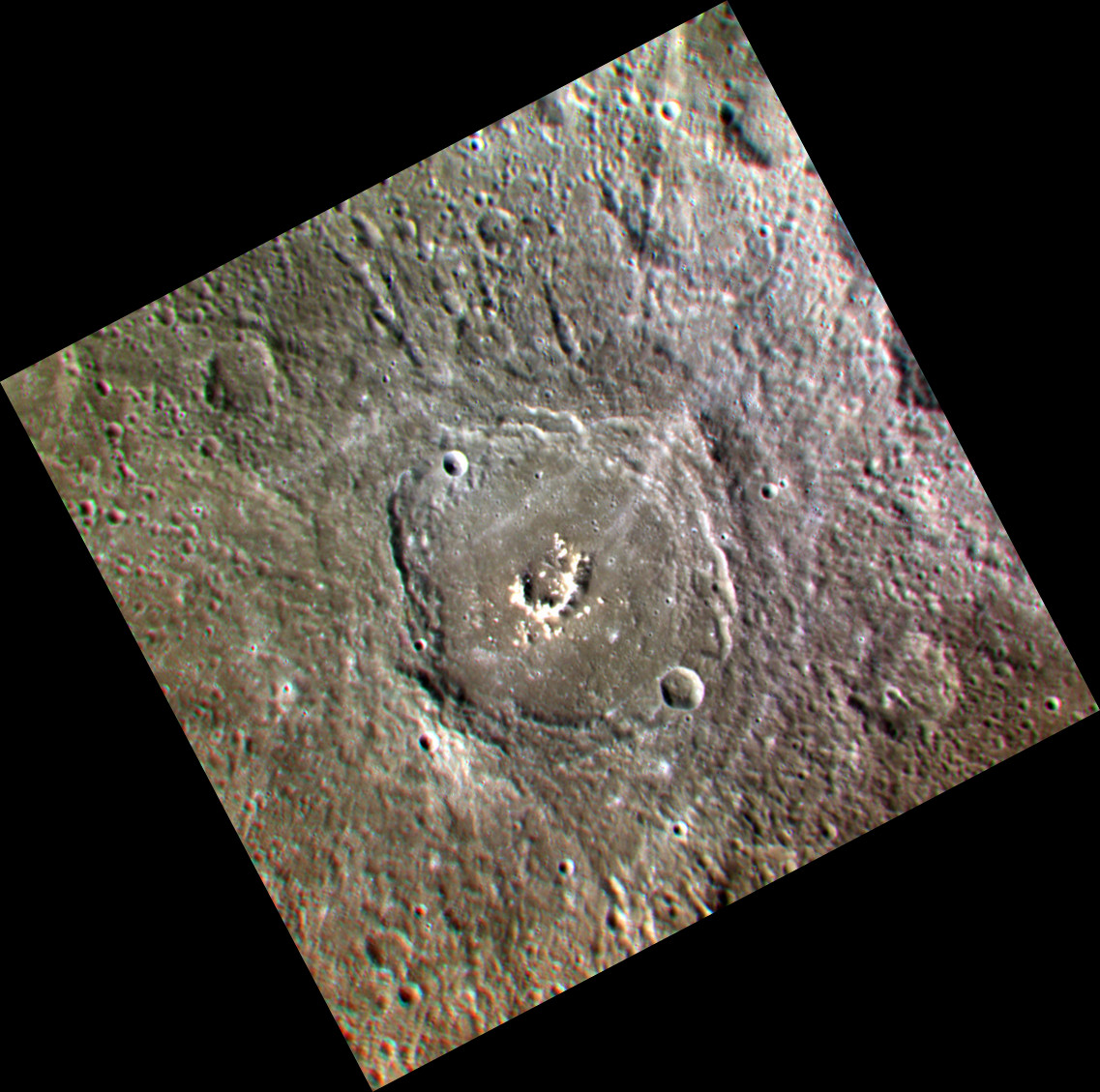
- MESSENGER approximate color image of Mickiewicz
- Feature type: Central-peak impact crater
- Location: Shakespeare quadrangle, Mercury
- Coordinates: 23.15°N 103.23°W
- Diameter: 103.0 km (64.0 mi)
- Eponym: Adam Mickiewicz

Mickiewicz is a crater on Mercury. Its name was adopted by the International Astronomical Union (IAU) in 1976. Mickiewicz is named for the Polish poet Adam Mickiewicz, who lived from 1798 to 1855.

Hollows are abundant in the area of the central peak complex of this crater.

== Views ==
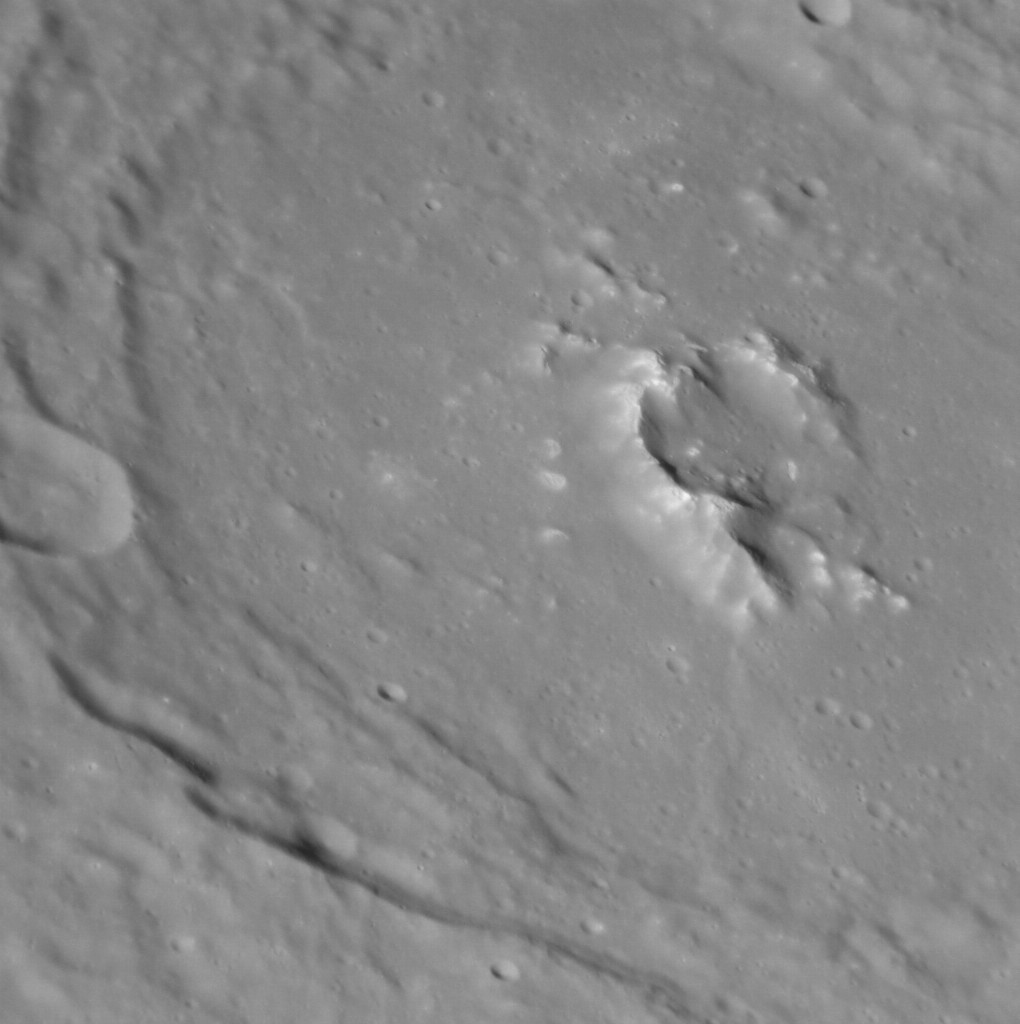
Oblique view of the southern part of the crater

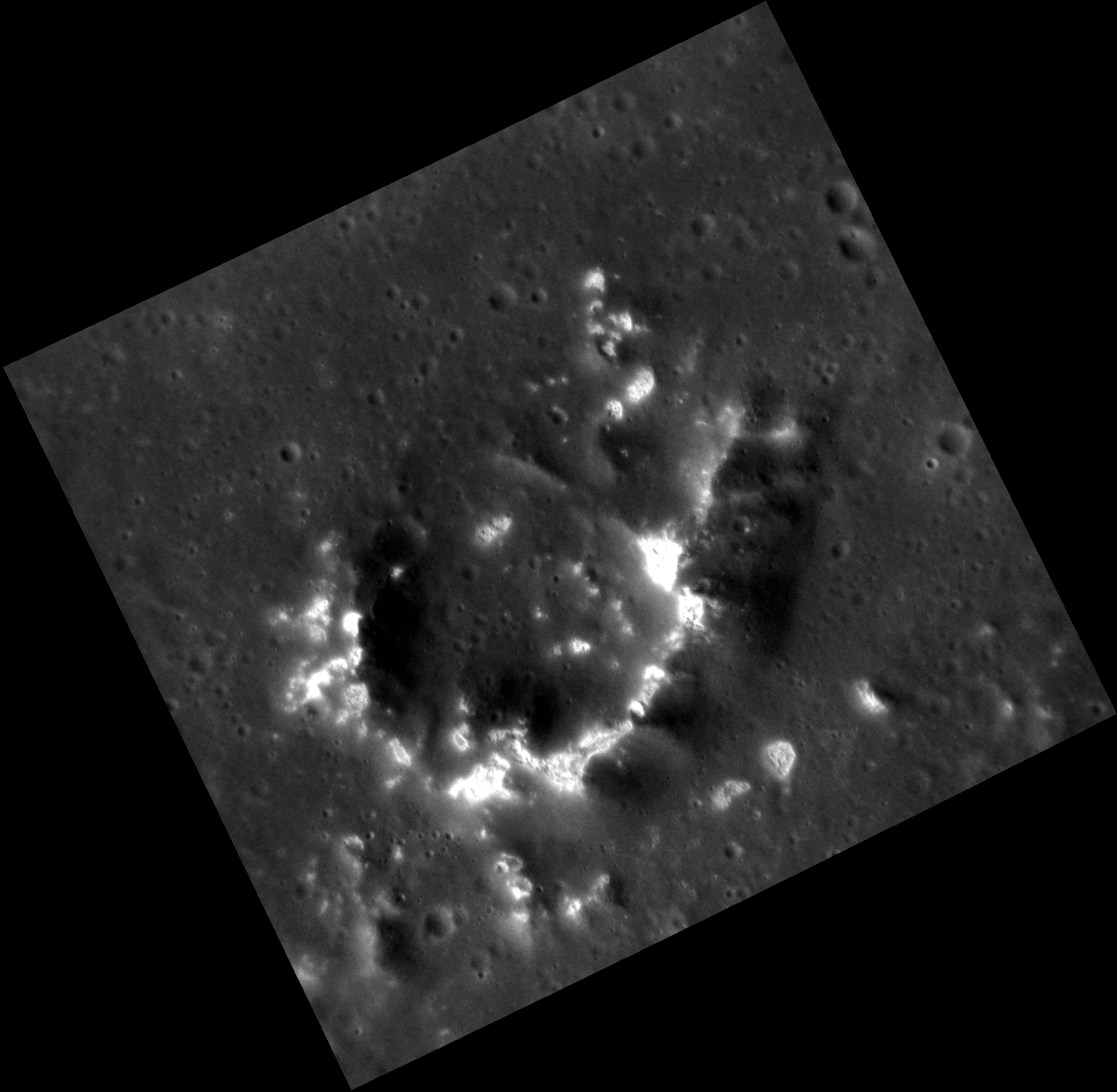
The central peak complex, with abundant hollows
