= Solaris (novel) =

1961 novel by Stanisław Lem

- Cover of the first edition
- Author: Stanisław Lem
- Cover artist: K.M. Sopoćko
- Language: Polish
- Genre: Science fiction
- Publisher: MON, Walker (US)
- Publication date: 1961
- Publication place: Polish People's Republic
- English publication date: 1970
- Media type: Print (hardcover and paperback); Audio
- Pages: 204
- ISBN: 0156027607
- OCLC: 10072735
- Dewey Decimal: 891.8/537 19
- LC Class: PG7158.L392 Z53 1985

Solaris (/səˈlɑːrɪs/) is a 1961 science fiction novel by Polish writer Stanisław Lem. It follows a crew of scientists on a hovering near-surface research facility as they attempt to understand an extraterrestrial intelligence, which takes the form of a vast ocean on the titular alien planet. The novel is one of Lem's best-known works.

The book has been adapted many times for film, radio, and theater. Prominent film adaptations include Andrei Tarkovsky's 1972 version and Steven Soderbergh's 2002 version, although Lem said that the films shifted away from the book's thematic emphasis on the limitations of human rationality.

== Plot summary ==
Solaris chronicles the ultimate futility of attempted communications with the extraterrestrial life inhabiting a distant alien planet named Solaris. The planet is almost completely covered with an ocean of black, gelatinous material that forms a single, planet-encompassing entity. Terran scientists conjecture it is a living and sentient being, and attempt to study it and communicate with it.

Kris Kelvin, a psychologist, arrives aboard Solaris Station, a scientific research station hovering near the oceanic surface of Solaris. The scientists there have studied the planet and its ocean for many decades, mostly in vain. A scientific discipline known as Solaristics has degenerated over the years to simply observing, recording and categorizing the complex phenomena that occur on the surface of the ocean. Thus far, the scientists have only compiled an elaborate nomenclature of the phenomena, and do not yet understand what they really mean. Shortly before Kelvin's arrival, the crew exposed the ocean to a more aggressive and unauthorized experimentation with a high-energy X-ray bombardment. Their experimentation gives unexpected results and becomes psychologically traumatic for them as individually flawed humans.

The ocean's response to this intrusion exposes the deeper, hidden aspects of the personalities of the human scientists, while revealing nothing of the ocean's nature itself. It does this by materializing physical simulacra (including human ones) based on the unpleasant repressed memories of the researchers, who visit the corresponding researchers. Kelvin confronts memories of his dead lover and guilt about her suicide, which constitutes a significant part of the plot. The "visitors" of the other persons are only alluded to.

All efforts to make sense of Solaris's activities prove futile.

== Characters ==
- Dr. Kris Kelvin, is a psychologist recently arrived from Earth to the space station studying the planet Solaris. He had previously been cohabiting with Harey ("Rheya" in the Kilmartin–Cox translation), who died by suicide.
- Snaut ("Snow" in the Kilmartin–Cox translation) is the first person Kelvin meets aboard the station.
- Gibarian, who had been an instructor of Kelvin's at university, killed himself just hours before Kelvin arrives at the station.
- Sartorius is the last inhabitant Kelvin meets.
- Harey ("Rheya" in the Kilmartin–Cox translation, an anagram of "Harey"), who kills herself with a lethal injection after quarreling with Kelvin and later her copy reappears at the space station, apparently produced by the Ocean of Solaris.

== Commentary ==
The novel is the best known elaboration of Lem's trope of the impossibility of communication with extraterrestrial intelligence, present in many of Lem's novels, including his first, The Man from Mars, and his last, Fiasco.

As Lem wrote, "the peculiarity of those phenomena seems to suggest that we observe a kind of rational activity, but the meaning of this seemingly rational activity of the Solarian Ocean is beyond the reach of human beings." Lem also wrote that he deliberately chose to make the sentient alien an ocean to avoid any personification and the pitfalls of anthropomorphism in depicting first contact.

In an interview, Lem said that the novel "has always been a juicy prey for critics", with interpretations ranging from that of Freudianism, critique of contact and colonialism, to anticommunism, proponents of the latter view holding that the Ocean represents the Soviet Union and the people on the space station represent the satellite countries of Central and Eastern Europe. He also commented on the absurdity of the book cover blurb for the 1976 edition, which said the novel "expressed the humanistic beliefs of the author about high moral qualities of the human". Lem noted that the critic who promulgated the Freudian idea actually blundered by basing his psychoanalysis on dialogue from the English translation, whereas his diagnosis would fail on the idioms in the original Polish text.

We are humanitarian and chivalrous; we don't want to enslave other races, we simply want to bequeath them our values and take over their heritage in exchange. We think of ourselves as the Knights of the Holy Contact. This is another lie. We are only seeking Man. We have no need of other worlds. We need mirrors.

— Solaris (§6:72), 1970 English translation

== English translations ==
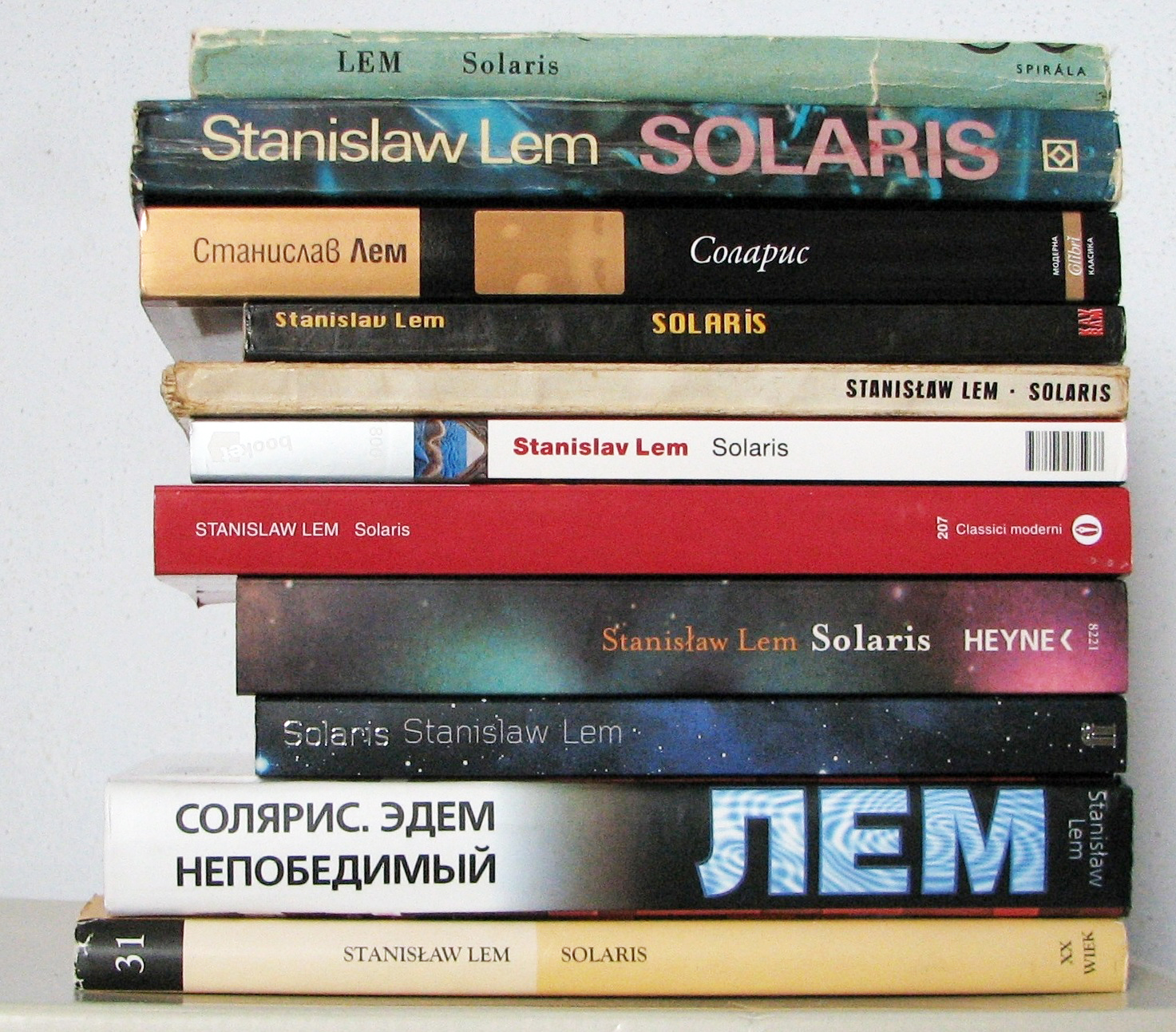
Translations of Solaris, including one in English.

Both the original Polish version of the novel (published in 1961) and its English translation are titled Solaris. Jean-Michel Jasiensko published his French translation in 1964. This version was the basis of Joanna Kilmartin and Steve Cox's English translation (Walker and Company, 1970; Faber and Faber, 1971). Lem, who read English fluently, repeatedly voiced his disappointment with the Kilmartin–Cox version.

In 2011, Bill Johnston completed an English translation from the Polish. Lem's wife and son reviewed this version more favorably: "We are very content with Professor Johnston's work, that seems to have captured the spirit of the original." It was released as an audio book and later in an Amazon Kindle edition (2014, ISBN 978-83-63471-41-5). Due to legal issues, this translation did not appear in print until 2024, when Conversation Tree Press published a fine press edition of the book.

== Cultural influence of the novel ==
=== Film ===
Solaris has been filmed three times:

- Solaris (1968), a Soviet TV play directed by Boris Nirenburg, follows the plot quite closely and keeps the emphasis on the planet rather than the human relationships.
- Solaris (1972), a Soviet feature-length film directed by Andrei Tarkovsky. The film loosely follows the novel's plot, emphasizing the human relationships instead of Lem's astrobiology theories — especially Kelvin's life on Earth prior to his space travel to the planet. The film won the Grand Prix at the 1972 Cannes Film Festival.
- Solaris (2002), an American film directed by Steven Soderbergh, starring George Clooney and produced by James Cameron. This film also emphasizes the human relationships and again excludes Lem's scientific and philosophical themes.

Lem himself observed that none of the film versions depict much of the extraordinary physical and psychological "alienness" of the Solaris ocean. Responding to film reviews of Soderbergh's version, Lem, noting that he did not see the film, wrote:

...to my best knowledge, the book was not dedicated to erotic problems of people in outer space... As Solaris' author I shall allow myself to repeat that I only wanted to create a vision of a human encounter with something that certainly exists, in a mighty manner perhaps, but cannot be reduced to human concepts, ideas or images. This is why the book was entitled "Solaris" and not "Love in Outer Space".

— Stanisław Lem,

=== Audio ===
- 1963: by the Teatre of Polskie Radio; director: Józef Grotowski, Kelvin: Stanisław Zaczyk
- 1975: by the Teatre of Polskie Radio; director: Józef Grotowski, Kelvin: Marek Walczewski
- 2007: BBC Radio 4 broadcast a two-hour dramatized version of the novel.
- 2007: an audio play was released in Russia on a CD-MP3 disc (226 minutes, 14 tracks).

==== Audiobooks ====
- 2010: Polskie Radio, narrated by Piotr Fronczewski
- 2011: Audible.com released the first direct Polish-to-English translation as an audiobook download narrated by Alessandro Juliani. The original Polish text was translated into English by Bill Johnston, with the approval of Lem's estate. An e-book edition (ISBN 978-1-937624-66-8) of the Johnston translation followed.

=== Theatre ===
- The 2009 Polish stage production Solaris: The Report (Polish: Solaris. Raport), TR Warszawa, Poland.
- The British stage production Solaris by Dimitry Devdariani (London, England, 2012).
- La velocidad del zoom del horizonte, a 2014 play written by David Gaitán and directed by Martín Acosta, premiered in Mexico City, was loosely based on the novel.
- In 2018 the Theater Magdeburg, Germany, staged an adaptation by Tim Staffel directed by Lucie Berelowitsch
- Solaris (2019 play), premiered in Malthouse Theatre, production of an adaptation by David Greig, in association with Royal Lyceum Theatre, Edinburgh, that ran in Edinburgh in September–October 2019 and at London's Lyric Hammersmith in October–November 2019. Its protagonist was a woman, and the spaceship crew was gender-balanced.
- Solaris 2 (2026 play), in Croatian language, a theatre project by Borut Šeparović "which transponds the text of the novel and Andrei Tarkovsky's 1972 film into the age of generative artificial intelligence and cloud data". The actors are performing on stage faced to the projected screens of Tarkovsky's film, while their's and film actors's faces are being AI-generated live on screens. Premiered in Istrian National Theater in Pula, January 2026.

=== Opera ===
- The German opera Solaris by Michael Obst (Munich Biennale, Germany, 1996).
- The Italian opera Solaris by Enrico Correggia (Turin, Italy, 2011).
- The Austrian opera Solaris by Detlev Glanert (Bregenzer Festspiele, Austria, 2012).
- The Japanese opera Solaris by Dai Fujikura and Saburo Teshigawara (Opéra de Lille, and travelling to other venues, 2015).

=== Other ===
- Musician Isao Tomita's 1977 album Kosmos, specifically the track "The Sea Named 'Solaris'", is based on music by Bach featured in Tarkovsky's film. Tomita was inspired by the film and even sent his recording to Tarkovsky.
- Hungarian rock band Solaris named themselves after the novel.
- The 1990 Russian ballet Solaris by Sergey Zhukov (Dnipro Opera and Ballet Theatre).
- The song "Solaris", composed by Ken Andrews, from space rock band Failure's 1996 album Fantastic Planet, summarizes the novel.
- Photek's 2000 album Solaris.
- The 2011 album Sólaris by Daníel Bjarnason and Ben Frost was inspired by Tarkovsky's film.
- The plot of the 2021 Icelandic TV series Katla uses elements from Solaris, inspired by the novel.
- The Solaris is the only synchrotron in Central Europe and takes its name from the novel.
- The 2018 Russian ballet Solaris by Yuri Smekalove with music by Bhima Yunusov, premiered in Priyut Komedianta theatre in Saint Petersburg.
- Elements of the plot of the 2019 Chinese video game Arknights are inspired by the novel.
- The Ocean's 2026 album Solaris.
- The song Solaris by the German Tech Death band Obscura from their 2021 album A Valediction has lyrics that according to the album's liner notes, are loosely based off of the novel.

== See also ==
- Ocean world – Planet containing a significant amount of water or other liquid
