= BD+20 2457 =

Bright giant star in the constellation Leo

Observation data Epoch J2000.0 Equinox ICRS
- Constellation: Leo
- Right ascension: 10^{h} 16^{m} 44.8672^{s}
- Declination: +19° 53′ 29.010″
- Apparent magnitude (V): 9.75

Characteristics
- Spectral type: K2II
- B−V color index: +1.25

Astrometry
Proper motion (μ)	RA: −35.952(19) mas/yr Dec.: −29.961(18) mas/yr
Parallax (π)	0.6787±0.0200 mas
Distance	4,800 ± 100 ly (1,470 ± 40 pc)

Details
Mass	≤1 M_{☉}
Radius	49±26 R_{☉}
Luminosity	1,479 L_{☉}
Surface gravity (log g)	1.51 cgs
Temperature	4,127±17 K
Metallicity [Fe/H]	−1.00±0.07 dex
Age	≥8 Gyr

Other designations
- PPM 127264

Database references
SIMBAD	data
Exoplanet Archive	data

BD+20 2457 is a 10th-magnitude K-type bright giant star located approximately 4,800 light-years away in the constellation of Leo. The name refers to the Bonner Durchmusterung star catalog. This star contains a very small amount of metals, containing only 10% as enriched with elements heavier than hydrogen and helium as the Sun.

== Planetary system ==
On June 10, 2009, two planets were announced to be orbiting the star, with minimum masses 21.4 and 12.5 times the mass of Jupiter and orbital periods of 380 and 622 days for the inner and outer planets, respectively. A dynamical analysis reveals that the proposed system is unstable on astronomically short timescales and so the suggested planetary configuration is unlikely to be correct: further data is needed to determine a physically plausible explanation for the radial velocity variations. This conclusion of a dynamical unstable system depends on the planets masses. A later study found lower masses, which could increase the long-term stability.

A study from 2021 using Gaia identified BD+20 2457 as a halo star on a retrograde orbit around the Milky Way with a highly eccentric orbit. The researchers constrain the minimum age and the stars upper mass to ≥8 billion years and ≤1 M_{☉}. This decreases the mass of the planets to 13 M_{J} (BD+20 2457 b) and 7 M_{J} (BD+20 2457 c). The chemical abundances also suggest that the star formed from the Milky Way's protodisk. As an alternative it could have formed from debris of the Gaia-Enceladus galaxy as it merged with the Milky Way. If BD+20 2457 formed from the Gaia-Enceladus debris, then the star and its planets could have an extragalactic origin.
