= A Tale of Two Cities (1980 film) =

- Genre: Drama; History; Romance; War
- Based on: A Tale of Two Cities by Charles Dickens
- Screenplay by: John Gay
- Directed by: Jim Goddard
- Starring: Chris Sarandon; Alice Krige
- Composer: Allyn Ferguson
- Country of origin: United States
- Original language: English

Production
- Producer: Norman Rosemont
- Cinematography: Tony Imi
- Editor: Bill Blunden
- Running time: 162 minutes
- Production companies: Hallmark Hall of Fame; Marble Arch Productions; Norman Rosemont Productions; ITC Entertainment Group
- Budget: $5 million

Original release
- Network: CBS
- Release: December 2, 1980

A Tale of Two Cities is a 1980 American historical drama film made for TV, directed by Jim Goddard and starring Chris Sarandon, who plays dual roles as Charles Darnay and Sydney Carton, two men who are both in love with the same woman, Lucie Manette. It is based on the 1859 Charles Dickens novel of the same name set in the French Revolution.

== Plot ==
London lawyer Sydney Carton decides how much he will sacrifice for Lucie Manette, the woman he loves, in Paris during the Reign of Terror.

== Cast ==
- Chris Sarandon as Charles Darnay / Sydney Carton
- Alice Krige as Lucie Manette
- Peter Cushing as Dr. Alexandre Manette
- Kenneth More as Jarvis Lorry
- Barry Morse as Marquis St. Evrémonde
- Flora Robson as Miss Pross
- Billie Whitelaw as Madame Therese Defarge
- Nigel Hawthorne as CJ Stryver
- Norman Jones as Ernest Defarge
- George Innes as Jerry Cruncher
- David Suchet as John Barsad
- Bernard Hug as Gaspard
- Valérie de Tilbourg as Seamstress
- Robert Urquhart as Attorney General
- Anna Manahan as Vengeance
- Gerald James as Gabelle
- Bernard Archard as Court President
- Martha Parsey as Little Lucie
- Robin Scobey as Victor
- John Kidd as Chemist
- Dennis Gimes as French Soldier

== Production ==
Producer Norman Rosemont specialised in adaptations of classic novels. Most of the $5 million budget came from Hallmark Greeting Cards. Kenneth More's sizeable supporting role as Jarvis Lorry was his last role on screen.

== Reception ==
Olga Lehmann was nominated for the Primetime Emmy Award for Outstanding Costumes for a Miniseries, Movie, or Special at the 33rd Primetime Emmy Awards. The film was also nominated for the Golden Globe Award for Best Limited or Anthology Series or Television Film at the 38th Golden Globe Awards.
