= A Tale of Two Cities (1989 TV series) =

- Genre: Historical drama
- Based on: A Tale of Two Cities by Charles Dickens
- Written by: Arthur Hopcraft
- Directed by: Philippe Monnier
- Starring: James Wilby; Serena Gordon; John Mills; Jean-Pierre Aumont
- Composer: Serge Franklin
- Countries of origin: France; United Kingdom
- Original language: English
- No. of series: 1
- No. of episodes: 2

Production
- Executive producer: Steve Hawes
- Producer: Roy Roberts
- Cinematography: Ken Morgan
- Editor: Edward Mansell
- Running time: 188 minutes
- Production company: Granada Television

Original release
- Network: ITV
- Release: 21 May – 22 May 1989

A Tale of Two Cities is a British-French television series that first aired on ITV between 21 and 22 May 1989. It is an adaptation of the novel A Tale of Two Cities by Charles Dickens.

== Plot summary ==
When Charles Darnay is accused of spying, he's unexpectedly freed by a stranger, London lawyer Sydney Carton, who could be his twin. But in addition to their looks, the men share something else: their love for a beautiful woman Lucie Manette.

== Selected cast ==
- James Wilby as Sydney Carton
- Xavier Deluc as Charles Darnay
- Serena Gordon as Lucie Manette
- John Mills as Jarvis Lorry
- Jean-Pierre Aumont as Dr. Alexandre Manette
- Anna Massey as Miss Pross
- Kathy Kriegel as Madame Defarge
- Alfred Lynch as Jerry Cruncher
- Gérard Klein as Monsieur Defarge
- Jonathan Adams as Stryver
- Karl Johnson as Barsad
- Marie Bunel as Peasant Girl
- Gilles Gaston-Dreyfus as Road Mender
- François Lalande as Gabelle
- Claude Le Saché as Aristocrat
- André Maranne as Aristocrat
- Nicolas Serreau as Jacques
- Jean-Pierre Stewart as Public Prosecutor
- Michel Subor as Le père de Darnay
- Jean-Marc Bory as Marquis St. Evrémonde
- Mary Healey as Mrs. Cruncher

== Bibliography ==
- Ellen Baskin. Serials on British Television, 1950-1994. Scolar Press, 1996.
