= A Tale of Two Cities (1958 film) =

1958 film

- Original UK cinema poster
- Directed by: Ralph Thomas
- Screenplay by: T. E. B. Clarke
- Based on: A Tale of Two Cities; 1859 novel by Charles Dickens
- Produced by: Betty E. Box
- Starring: Dirk Bogarde; Dorothy Tutin; Cecil Parker
- Cinematography: Ernest Steward
- Edited by: Alfred Roome
- Music by: Richard Addinsell
- Production company: The Rank Organisation
- Distributed by: Rank Film Distributors
- Release date: 1958
- Running time: 117 minutes
- Country: United Kingdom
- Language: English
- Budget: £320,000

A Tale of Two Cities is a 1958 British film directed by Ralph Thomas and starring Dirk Bogarde and Dorothy Tutin. It is a period drama based on parts of Charles Dickens' novel A Tale of Two Cities (1859).

== Plot ==
Sydney Carton, an alcoholic English lawyer, discovers that Charles Darnay, a man he once defended, is a French aristocrat trying to escape the French Revolution. While he envies the man over the love of a woman, Lucie Manette, his conscience is pricked and he resolves to help him escape the guillotine.

== Cast ==
- Dirk Bogarde as Sydney Carton
- Dorothy Tutin as Lucie Manette
- Paul Guers as Charles Darnay (voice dubbed by Tim Turner – uncredited)
- Marie Versini as Marie Gabelle
- Ian Bannen as Gabelle
- Alfie Bass as Jerry Cruncher
- Cecil Parker as Jarvis Lorry
- Stephen Murray as Dr. Manette
- Athene Seyler as Miss Pross
- Ernest Clark as Stryver
- Rosalie Crutchley as Madame Defarge
- Freda Jackson as the Vengeance
- Duncan Lamont as Ernest Defarge
- Leo McKern as Attorney General-Old Bailey
- Donald Pleasence as John Barsad
- Christopher Lee as Marquis St. Evremonde
- Sam Kydd as Coachman

== Production ==
Thomas Clarke wrote the script. He had read the novel at school and "had been disappointed by a book that a lesser author might have written; but I could appreciate its potential as a period action film and readily undertook to script." Clarke said he had no wish to see the 1935 version until he wrote the script as "there is always the danger in a remake that one might steal another screenwriter’s innovation under the impression that it was part of the original work." Among the changes to Clarke's adaptation including limiting the time period to three years.

Ralph Thomas insisted on the film being shot in black and white as he felt the book "was written in black and white, and it's got to be made in black and white." He was influenced by a French film Casque d'Or set in a similar period which was in black and white. Box says that were influenced by Gervaise as well.

Borgarde said “We all felt right from the beginning that the only way to make this film was as a documentary.” Thomas added, "For that reason, we decided against making it in colour because this would destroy the stark realism we are trying to get.”

Even in black and white the film was the most expensive British production of its year.

Dorothy Tutin said "I didn’t think I was right for the part: it needed to be a blonde, beautiful girl like Virginia McKenna. I knew the novel well, so I was never going to turn it down, I just never felt I was quite right visually. I think Dirk really got me the part and I think he was wrong, although I enjoyed the filming in France until I got ill, and I did enjoy working with Dirk, who was extremely nice."

=== Shooting ===
Filming started 3 July 1957 at Bourges in France for four weeks of location work. The film was shot in the Loire Valley in France, because it was the only place without telegraph poles. Several thousand American soldiers posted nearby in Orléans were used as extras, which was needed as it was harvest time and French people were not as available. "The only way we were able to finish a film this ambitious on such a modest budget was by using a regular crew, so there were no fights, we just tackled it and went on until the finish", said Thomas.

Box said "it poured with rain the whole bloody time. It was fated from beginning to end. It was unbearably hot until the day we started shooting, and then the heavens opened. All the costumes were wet and everything was muddy and sets fell down in the street. But of course Dirk was very good indeed, and he was certainly handsome!"

Scenes at the home of the Marquis St. Evremonde were shot at the chateau at Valencay on the Loire. English locations were filmed in Buckinghamshire. The rest of the movie was shot at Pinewood.

John Davis of Rank felt the film had a strong chance of success in America calling it "authentic, absorbing and beautifully played by another brilliant cast, this time headed by international favourite Dick [sic] Bogarde and the lovely and gifted young actress Dorothy Tutin." The studio felt that this film and A Night to Remember had a strong chance of appealing in America.

== Release ==
The film was released in London in February 1958 and in the US in July 1958.

An American television version of the novel was broadcast in March 1958.

== Reception ==
=== Critical reception ===
Variety called it "a good adventure yarn and the French Revolution sequences offer a director lively opportunities for colorful action, which Ralph Thomas has deftly grabbed."

The Guardian called it "a plain and honest version which makes a decent attempt at putting the complexities of the story into two hours."

The New York Times wrote "it is mostly a bloodless and sober, albeit meticulous account that is spun here"; The Monthly Film Bulletin called it "an eminently respectable but scarcely distinguished addition to the list of filmed Dickens", noting that Rosalie Crutchley's "tirelessly bloodthirsty Mme Defarge – blatantly theatrical but full of gusto – is particularly welcome. This kind of vividness and life is exactly what the film as a whole lacks. However, AllMovie found "a respectable adaptation with a sterling lead performance (Bogarde)"; and TV Guide wrote "This version strives for the careful attention to detail that mark the best BBC-produced literary translations today....Perhaps this is not as melodramatic as the Hollywood version, but, to some, it is infinitely more satisfying."

Thomas claimed "the Russians thought it was the definitive work on Dickens! It was one of Dirk’s best pictures, I think. It was a well-cast picture... Duncan Lamont was a terrific Defarge Christopher Lee’s straight performance as the Marquis was very good, very contained. There was also a marvellous girl, Marie Versin."

Production designer Carmen Dillon called it "a rotten film, very poor, I’m ashamed of my work on it. TEB Clarke did the script and it wasn’t his cup of tea. Perhaps it should have been made in colour, but it wasn't good."

Tutin said, "I felt the whole film was a bit slow, lacking energy. I did think it was a good idea to film it in black-and-white, so I’m surprised that Dirk, Ralph and Betty all thought it should have been filmed in colour."

Dirk Bogarde felt "Clarke did a brilliant job on the adaptation; we had a most impressive cast of (mainly) theatre actors; enormous care was lavished on the authenticity of sets and costumes; we went all the way to Bourges in France and shot the film there. But even though it was a faithful 'reproduction' of Dickens, even though we spoke his words and delivered his rather preposterous plot perfectly to the screen, the film failed."

=== Box office ===
The film was a box office disappointment, not making the list of top grossing films at the British box office in 1958. However it was listed as one of Rank's more successful films that year, along with A Night to Remember, Carve Her Name with Pride, The Wind Cannot Read, Sea of Sand, Just My Luck and Rooney.

Carmen Dillon said, "They lost a lot of money about it, it was bad luck. Betty is such a competent, capable woman, so nice."

Dirk Bogarde called it "a failure in the cinema" arguing this was because:

(A), they wanted Ronald Colman, and (B), we cut costs and made it in black and white. Although it drove a generation of schoolgirls into hysterics (my breeches were pretty tight) and still sends hordes of Japanese ladies (and some gentlemen) frantic to this day (for the same reason), the effort was not successful. Apart from in Japan, where people have very short legs. Mine were long. As a ‘classic’ adaptation, it could not be faulted, but it did not transfer to the screen of the late fifties. It was not of the time. And, I fear, because of my position in popular cinema then, it just came over as 'another Dirk Bogarde piece'. OK for the fans, but not really suitable for the nobs. In the UK anyway, my name stuck to a classic was the kiss of death. Abroad it was not. After all, mine was a foreign name, and abroad I had long been accepted as a serious player. I suppose because they had been mercifully spared most of the junk films I had had to make in the early years.

Thomas later said shooting the film in black and white was a mistake and the commercial after-life of the film would have been stronger if it had been in colour, particularly sales to television. He said the film "was very self indulgent because I wouldn't listen to advice. It's dangerous to have fashion and power and I was fashionable then." Betty Box said "At that time Rank would have said OK, if I'd told them I wanted to make it in purple. What we didn’t realise was, that very soon, we were going to depend quite a lot on television sales. And they paid nothing for black-and-white. So we dropped £100,000 straight away, which, in those days, was a lot of money."

Filmink called the film "a tribute to the whole Rank Organisation" and its poor "financial performance must have shattered the studio."
