= A Far Better Thing =

2025 novel by H. G. Parry

- First edition cover
- Author: H. G. Parry
- Language: English
- Genres: Historical fantasy; Retelling
- Publisher: Tor Books
- Publication date: 17 June 2025
- Publication place: New Zealand
- Media type: Trade paperback
- Pages: 416
- ISBN: 978-1-250-33418-3

A Far Better Thing is a 2025 historical fantasy novel by New Zealand author H. G. Parry. It was first published in June 2025 in the United States by Tor Books. The book is a retelling of Charles Dickens's 1859 historical novel A Tale of Two Cities with fairy changelings.

== Background ==
Parry said in an interview that she read A Tale of Two Cities soon after her first visit to London and Paris in 2015. After pondering the similarities between Sydney Carton and Charles Darnay in Dickens's novel, she asked herself the question, "what if Carton and Darnay look identical because Darnay is Carton's changeling?" For ten years, Parry developed A Far Better Thing around that question, beginning with a simple reworking of A Tale of Two Cities from Carton's perspective, then slowly introducing fairies and magic. She explained that her novel is a "shadow version" of Dickens's novel with "hidden spaces" in Paris and London – including a goblin market hidden behind a secret door, and a house stuck outside time. Parry said, "My favourite magical worlds are always the ones lurking just out of reach, and places like London and Paris, intricate and sprawling and lived-in for centuries, always feel layered with them."

Another retelling of A Tale of Two Cities from Carton's perspective is the 2000 novel, A Far Better Rest by Susanne Alleyn. In her novel, Alleyn explains the resemblance between Carton and Darnay by making them, unbeknown to each other, first cousins.

== Plot summary ==
In A Far Better Thing, Sydney Carton is taken by fairies as a baby, leaving behind his double, a changeling named Charles Darnay. In the fairy realm Carton is given the name Memory, and remains there until the age of thirteen. At this stage of his development he is given the choice of turning into a fairy, which means giving up his humanity, or returning to the mortal world, but as a servant of the fairies. Carton elects to return to the human world where he becomes a lawyer, but still at the fairies' bidding. While assisting during the trial of a suspected French spy, Carton discovers that the accused is his changeling, Charles Darnay. Mortal servants are prohibited from meeting their changelings, but this encounter happens because of the interference of Shadow, a rogue fairy and Carton's master. Against the background of the French Revolution, Carton becomes embroiled in both human and fairy politics. He sees this as an opportunity to avenge Shadow for making his life a misery, and Darney for stealing his rightful place in society. Carton also sees this as an opportunity to break free of his fairy servitude.

== Critical reception ==
A starred review at Publishers Weekly described A Far Better Thing as a "masterful fantasy riff" of A Tale of Two Cities. The review said the narrative progresses at a leisurely pace, but the reader is rewarded with a "rip-roaring tale rooted in love, vengeance, and justice." Leah von Essen wrote in Booklist that A Far Better Thing is a "richly woven historical fantasy". She said the novel's fae are "convincingly terrifying", and while the book is slow to get going, it quickly becomes "addictive". In a review of the book in the Library Journal, Andrea Dyba praised Parry's characterisation, particularly that of Sydney, who Dyba called "a deeply compelling protagonist". Dyba stated that A Far Better Thing is "a seamless blend of history, literature, and imagination", and "a tale as vivid and textured as the classic that inspired it."

In The Historical Novels Review, Melissa Bissonette wrote that in A Far Better Thing, Parry uses "fairy mischief" to explain the similarities between Carton and Darnay in A Tale of Two Cities. Bissonette called the parallels between Parry's Carton and the Dickens character "a major feat for a first-person hero". Mia Rhee stated in the Chicago Review of Books that she found A Far Better Thing's first-person narrative a little restrictive. She explained that having the story told from Sydney Carton's perspective immerses the reader in the contempt he feels for himself, and gives little insight into Charles Darnay's character. Rhee added that she would have preferred a third-person narrative, as Parry had used in The Magician's Daughter, and benefited from "the distance that narrative structure afforded".

Reviewing A Far Better Thing in Strange Horizons, Anushree Nande wrote that in Dickens's novel, there is no backstory, and events and coincidences happen with little or no explanation. In Parry's retelling, explanations are offered, and in particular, why Carton and Darnay are so similar. Nande said the reasons for Carton's self-loathing and drunkenness are provided, "making him an even more captivating protagonist" than the original Dickens character. Nande stated that "a good retelling needs to balance respect for the original with its own authenticity." She noted that Parry has not simply copied the original story's structure, but expanded it by introducing the fairy realm and a new "narrative agenda". Nande concluded that "Parry deftly ties it all together, fairy and Dickens, in a devastating, brilliant, satisfying whole."
