= A Far Better Rest =

2000 novel by Susanne Alleyn

- First edition cover
- Author: Susanne Alleyn
- Language: English
- Genres: Historical fiction; Retelling
- Publisher: Soho Press
- Publication date: July 1, 2000
- Publication place: United States
- Media type: Hardcover
- Pages: 353
- ISBN: 978-1-569-47197-5

A Far Better Rest is a 2000 historical novel by American author Susanne Alleyn. It is Alleyn's debut novel, and was first published in July 2000 in the United States by Soho Press. The book is a retelling of Charles Dickens' 1859 historical novel, A Tale of Two Cities from Sydney Carton's perspective, which includes details of Carton's life missing from the original.

== Plot summary ==
Sydney Carton was born in England to a wealthy English merchant and his French wife. He relocates to Paris to study art, and meets a French nobleman, Charles Darnay from a family tarnished by scandal. Sydney notices that Charles appears to be Sydney's look-alike. When Sydney announces to his family that his is to marry a woman of little wealth, his father disinherits him. Sydney returns to London where his father forces him to study law. But disillusioned and depressed, Sydney turns to whoring and debauchery. Sydney meets Lucie Manette, and quickly falls in love with her kindness and beauty, but keeps his feelings for her a secret. He manages to become a lawyer and finds himself representing Charles, who is now living in England and is accused of treason. The charges against Charles are found to be fabricated, and he is acquitted. Charles marries Lucie, and a despondent Sydney returns to Paris, where he becomes involved in French politics and witnesses the events of the French Revolution. Later Sydney learns that Charles' family history crossed paths with his own, and that Sydney and Charles are first cousins.

== Critical reception ==
In a review of A Far Better Rest in the Lancaster, Pennsylvania Sunday News, Helen Colwell Adams wrote that Susanne Alleyn does more than explain the mysterious Sydney Carton: she attempts to balance Dickens' portrayal of the French Revolution as a bloodbath by showing that there was hope in the beginning, and that it was not quite as terrible as Dickens described. Adams stated that while Alleyn makes no attempt to "rewrite literary history", she has "mesh[ed] her vision with that of Dickens [to] produce a classic tale of her own".

In The Historical Novels Review, Teresa Eckford stated that by retelling A Tale of Two Cities from Sydney Carton's perspective, Alleyn has made the story "intensely more personal". Eckford found A Far Better Rest "engrossing right from the start", and the characters "well-rounded and thoroughly captivating". She opined that, "[i]n the hands of a less skilled writer, this book could have been a disappointment or worse, yet Ms. Alleyn succeeds admirably." Reviewing A Far Better Rest in Publishers Weekly, Sybil S. Steinberg called the book "a richly textured, tragic tale". She said the novel's characters are rendered "with skill and depth", and Alleyn's meticulous research and "insightful storytelling" uses human drama to transport the reader back to those turbulent times.

A review in Kirkus Reviews was a little more critical, calling A Far Better Rest "[c]anned history and muted histrionics ... dutifully paraded in this earnest, overlong debut". The review criticized the author's "high-flown dialogue, a mixture of romantic fustian and exposition-heavy authorial overmanagement". It stated that while some of the book's characters "strike a few sparks ... Alleyn's bold effort is little more than a pale imitation" of the Dickens original.
