= A Tale of Two Cities (1935 film) =

1935 film by Robert Zigler Leonard, Jack Conway

- 1935 US Theatrical Poster
- Directed by: Jack Conway
- Written by: W. P. Lipscomb; S. N. Behrman
- Based on: A Tale of Two Cities; 1859 novel by Charles Dickens
- Produced by: David O. Selznick
- Starring: Ronald Colman; Elizabeth Allan
- Cinematography: Oliver T. Marsh
- Edited by: Conrad A. Nervig
- Music by: Herbert Stothart
- Production company: Metro-Goldwyn-Mayer
- Distributed by: Loew's, Inc
- Release date: December 27, 1935
- Running time: 123 minutes
- Country: United States
- Language: English
- Budget: $1,232,000
- Box office: $2.3 million (worldwide rentals)

A Tale of Two Cities is a 1935 film based upon Charles Dickens' 1859 historical novel, A Tale of Two Cities, set in London and Paris.

The film stars Ronald Colman as Sydney Carton and Elizabeth Allan as Lucie Manette. The supporting players include Edna May Oliver, Reginald Owen, Basil Rathbone, Lucille La Verne, Blanche Yurka, Henry B. Walthall and Donald Woods. It was directed by Jack Conway from a screenplay by W. P. Lipscomb and S. N. Behrman. The film was nominated for the Academy Award for Best Picture and Best Film Editing.

The story is set in France and England and spans several years before and during the French Revolution. It deals with the evils that precipitated the Revolution and with an innocent family and their friends caught up in the horrors of the Terror. Charles Darnay, a French aristocrat who has rejected his rank and moved to England, and Sydney Carton, an alcoholic English advocate, both fall in love with Lucie Manette. Lucie has brought her father to England to recover from 18 years of unjust imprisonment in the Bastille. Lucie befriends Carton and later marries Darnay. In the end, Carton saves Darnay's life by taking his place at the guillotine. The film is generally regarded as the best cinematic version of Dickens' novel and one of the best performances of Colman's career.

== Plot ==
The film opens with a portion of the famous introduction to the novel: “It was the best of times, it was the worst of times, it was the season of Light, it was the season of Darkness, we had everything before us, we had nothing before us... In short, it was a period very like the present...” Lucie Manette (Elizabeth Allan) and her servant and companion Miss Pross (Edna May Oliver) are informed by elderly banker Mr. Jarvis Lorry (Claude Gillingwater) that her father, Dr. Alexandre Mannette (Henry B. Walthall) is not dead, but has been a prisoner in the Bastille for eighteen years before finally being rescued. She travels with Mr. Lorry to Paris to take her father to her home in England. Dr. Manette has been cared for by a former servant, Ernest De Farge (Mitchell Lewis), and his wife (Blanche Yurka) who own a wine shop in Paris. The old man's mind has given way during his long ordeal, but Lucie's tender care begins to restore his sanity.

On the return trip across the English Channel, Lucie meets Charles Darnay (Donald Woods), a French aristocrat who, unlike his uncle, the Marquis St. Evremonde (Basil Rathbone), is sympathetic to the plight of the oppressed and impoverished French masses. He has denounced his uncle, relinquished his title, changed his name and is going to England to begin a new life. The marquis has Darnay framed for treason, but he is defended by barrister C.J. Stryver (Reginald Owen) and his highly proficient but cynical colleague Sydney Carton (Ronald Colman). Carton goes drinking with Barsad (Walter Catlett), the main prosecution witness and tricks him into admitting that he framed Darnay. When Barsad is called to testify, he is horrified to discover that Carton is a member of the defense. He recants his testimony to save himself, and Darnay is acquitted.

Following the trial, Carton is thanked by Lucie. He quickly falls in love with her. Darnay confesses to Dr. Manette he is the nephew of the Marquis St. Evremonde; Manette forgives him, but reserves the right to tell Lucie himself. On their way to church, Lucie meets Carton and invites him to join them and he accepts. Afterwards, she invites him into their home to celebrate Christmas, but he declines because he has been drinking. Lucie and Carton eventually become close friends. Carton has hopes that Lucie will requite his love, but one day she tells him that she is engaged to Darnay.

Lucie and Darnay marry and have a daughter, also named Lucie, who is very fond of Carton. By this time, the French Revolution is beginning. Charles' uncle, the Marquis St. Evremond is one of its first victims, stabbed in his sleep by a man whose child had been fatally run down by his coach. The long-suffering peasants vent their fury on the aristocrats, condemning scores daily to Madame Guillotine. Darnay is tricked into returning to Paris and is arrested. Lucie and Dr. Manette travel to Paris to save Darnay. Manette pleads for mercy for his son-in-law, but Madame De Farge, seeking revenge against all the Evremondes, convinces the tribunal to sentence Darnay to death, using a letter Dr. Manette wrote while in prison, cursing and denouncing the entire Evremonde family.

Upon learning of Darnay's imprisonment, Carton travels to Paris to comfort Lucie. Carton consults Mr. Lorry and tells him of his plan to rescue Darnay. Carton discovers Barsad is also in Paris and works as a spy in the prisons. Carton overcomes Barsad's reluctance to help him with his scheme to rescue Darnay by threatening to reveal that Barsad had been a spy for the Marquis St. Evremonde. Barsad takes Carton to visit Darnay in his cell; Carton renders Darnay unconscious with ether, switches clothes with him, and finishes the letter Darnay has been writing to Lucie and puts it in Darnay's pocket. Darnay is carried out of the cell without anyone noticing the switch.

While Lucie prepares to return to England, Madame De Farge goes to provoke her into denouncing the Republic, but she is intercepted by Miss Pross inside the now-vacated apartment. Pross knows why Madame De Farge has come and is determined to stop her. The two women fight and De Farge pulls out a pistol, but in the ensuing struggle, Pross kills her. Darnay, Lucie, Manette, little Lucie, Lorry, and Pross all escape safely.

While awaiting execution, a condemned, innocent seamstress (Isabel Jewell) who was sentenced at the same time as Darnay, notices Carton has assumed his identity. She draws comfort from his bravery and sacrifice as they ride together to the guillotine. As Carton stands at the foot of the guillotine, drums roll and then fade away as the camera rises up past the guillotine to the city and the sky above. His voice is heard saying, "It's a far, far better thing I do than I have ever done. It's a far, far better rest I go to than I have ever known."

== Cast ==
- Ronald Colman as Sydney Carton. Colman had long wanted to play Sydney Carton on film. He was even willing to shave off his moustache.
- Elizabeth Allan as Lucie Manette
- Edna May Oliver as Miss Pross
- Reginald Owen as C.J. Stryver
- Basil Rathbone as Marquis St. Evremonde
- Blanche Yurka as Madame Therese De Farge
- Henry B. Walthall as Dr. Alexandre Manette
- Donald Woods as Charles Darnay
- Walter Catlett as John Barsad
- Fritz Leiber as Gaspard
- H. B. Warner as Theophile Gabelle
- Mitchell Lewis as Ernest De Farge
- Claude Gillingwater as Jarvis Lorry
- Billy Bevan as Jerry Cruncher
- Isabel Jewell as the Seamstress
- Lucille LaVerne as The Vengeance
- Tully Marshall as a Woodcutter
- Fay Chaldecott as Lucie Darnay, a child
- Eily Malyon as Mrs. Cruncher
- E. E. Clive as Judge in Old Bailey
- Lawrence Grant as a Prosecutor
- Robert Warwick as Judge at tribunal
- Ralf Harolde as a Prosecutor
- John Davidson as Morveau
- Tom Ricketts as Tellson Jr.
- Donald Haines as Jerry Cruncher Jr.
- Barlowe Borland as Jacques

== Production ==
Filming ran from June 4, 1935, to August 19, 1935 The picture premiered in New York City on December 15, 1935.

The closing credits spell the name De Farge. Dickens spelled it Defarge in the novel.

According to TCM's Genevieve McGillicuddy, “Selznick had no trouble finding a lead actor... Ronald Colman had coveted the part since he began his career and knew the novel intimately. In an interview seven years before being cast as Sydney Carton, Colman reflected on Dickens' forte for characterization, stating that Carton 'has lived for me since the first instant I discovered him in the pages of the novel.' "

In the book, Carton and Darnay are supposed to be as alike as twins. According to TCM, Selznick wanted Colman to play both roles, but Colman refused because of his experience with The Masquerader (1933). Selznick later commented, "I am glad now that he held out for that, because I think a great deal of the illusion of the picture might have been lost had Colman rescued Colman and had Colman gone to the guillotine so that Colman could go away with Lucie." In 1937, Colman did play a dual role for Selznick in The Prisoner of Zenda.

Judith Anderson, May Robson, Emily Fitzroy and Lucille LaVerne all tested for Madame De Farge. LaVerne's portrayal in another role, as "The Vengeance", inspired the character of the Evil Queen in Disney's Snow White and the Seven Dwarfs: She provided the voices for both the Queen and the hag. Blanche Yurka, a noted Broadway actress at the time, made her film debut playing Madame De Farge.

== Reception ==
Andre Sennwald wrote in The New York Times of December 26, 1935: "Having given us 'David Copperfield', Metro-Goldwyn-Mayer now heaps up more Dickensian magic with a prodigally stirring production of 'A Tale of Two Cities' ... For more than two hours it crowds the screen with beauty and excitement, sparing nothing in its recital of the Englishmen who were caught up in the blood and terror of the French Revolution ... The drama achieves a crisis of extraordinary effectiveness at the guillotine, leaving the audience quivering under its emotional sledge-hammer blows ... Ronald Colman gives his ablest performance in years as Sydney Carton and a score of excellent players are at their best in it ... Only Donald Woods's Darnay is inferior, an unpleasant study in juvenile virtue. It struck me, too, that Blanche Yurka was guilty of tearing an emotion to tatters in the rôle of Madame De Farge ... you can be sure that 'A Tale of Two Cities' will cause a vast rearranging of ten-best lists."

The Marquis St. Evrémonde character from this production was nominated for the 2003 American Film Institute list AFI's 100 Years...100 Heroes & Villains.
