= Madame Defarge =

Fictional character in A Tale of Two Cities

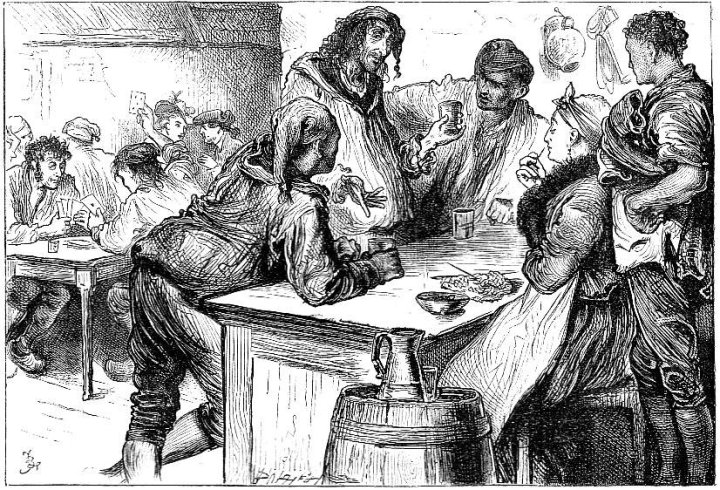
Illustration by Fred Barnard of the Wine-Shop in St. Antoine; Madame Defarge is seated with her knitting, her husband Ernest Defarge standing behind her

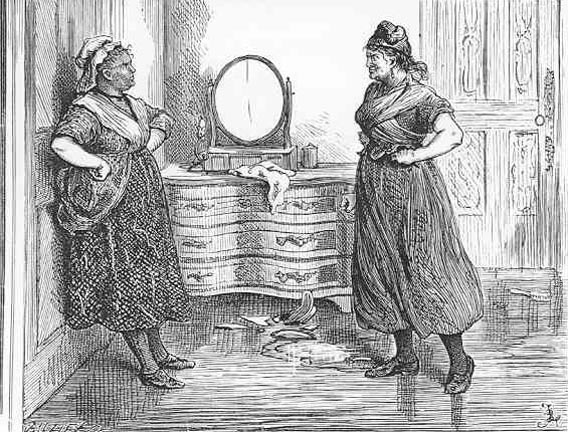
Madame Defarge (right) and Miss Pross by Fred Barnard, 1870s

Madame Thérèse Defarge is a fictional character and the main antagonist of the 1859 novel A Tale of Two Cities by Charles Dickens. She is a ringleader of the tricoteuses, a tireless worker for the French Revolution, memorably knitting beside the guillotine during executions. She is the wife of Ernest Defarge.

Some historians have suggested that Dickens based Defarge on revolutionaries Théroigne de Mericourt, who played a key role in street demonstrations, and Olympe de Gouges, known as Fury and founder of apocryphal Club of Knitting Women.

She is one of the main villains of the novel, obsessed with revenge against the Evrémondes. She ruthlessly pursues this goal against Charles Darnay, his wife, Lucie Manette, and their child, for crimes a prior generation of the Evrémonde family had committed. These include the deaths of her nephew, sister, brother, father and brother-in-law. She refuses to accept the reality that Charles Darnay changed his ways by intending to renounce his title to the lands to give them to the peasants who worked on them.

After Charles's arrogant and snobbish uncle becomes the Marquis St. Evrémonde, the marquis's arrogance causes the death of an innocent child, which makes him hated and helps legitimize Defarge's rage. Her consuming need for revenge against the Evrémonde family, including the innocent Darnay and his wife, brings about her death by her own weapon at the hands of Miss Pross.

== Reception ==
Defarge symbolises several themes. She represents one aspect of the Fates. The Moirai (the Fates as represented in Greek mythology) used yarn to measure out the life of a man, and cut it to end it; Defarge knits, and her knitting secretly encodes the names of people to be killed. Defarge also symbolises the nature of the Reign of Terror during the French Revolution in which radical Jacobins engaged in mass political persecution of all real or supposed enemies of the Revolution who were executed on grounds of sedition to the new republic with the guillotine, particularly targeting people with aristocratic heritage.

Defarge often has been dismissed as a one-dimensional embodiment of 'the Terror'; however, some scholars argue that her character is much more complex than this association implies. Defarge's desire for revenge ultimately stems from the rape of her pregnant sister at the hands of the aristocratic Evrémonde brothers, and Teresa Mangum therefore suggests that "the logic driving her story is that the secret crime of sexual violence against women fuels the French Revolution".

== Portrayals in film and theatre ==
- In the 1935 film A Tale of Two Cities, Madame Defarge is played by Blanche Yurka.
- In the 1958 film A Tale of Two Cities, Madame Defarge is played by Rosalie Crutchley.
- In the 1980 TV movie A Tale of Two Cities, Madame Defarge is played by Billie Whitelaw.
- In the 1981 Mel Brooks parody History of the World, Part I, Madame Defarge (played by Cloris Leachman) is the chief conspirator in the plot to overthrow King Louis XVI. She has become so poor she has run out of wool and simply rubs her knitting needles together.
- In the 2008 Broadway musical adaptation of A Tale of Two Cities, Madame Defarge is played by Natalie Toro.

== Influences ==
In the 2012 superhero film The Dark Knight Rises, the character of Talia al Ghul played by Marion Cotillard was heavily influenced by the character of Madame Defarge. Also, in the same movie, the villain Bane can be seen sitting and knitting (like Madame Defarge) in the audience of one of the "trials" presided over by The Scarecrow (Cillian Murphy).
