= Sydney Carton =

- A Tale of Two Cities character
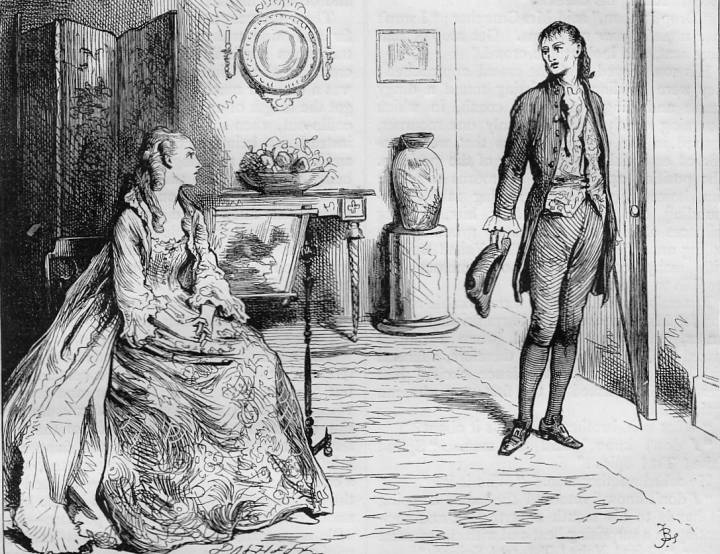
- Sydney Carton telling Lucie Manette of his devotion to her, by Fred Barnard
- Created by: Charles Dickens

In-universe information
- Gender: Male
- Occupation: Barrister
- Nationality: English

Sydney Carton is a central character in Charles Dickens' 1859 novel A Tale of Two Cities. He is a shrewd young Englishman educated at Shrewsbury School, and sometime junior to his fellow barrister Stryver. Carton is portrayed as a brilliant but depressed and cynical drunkard who is full of self-loathing because of what he sees as his wasted life. He feels a deep unrequited love for Lucie Manette, who nevertheless inspires him to try to be a better person. Near the end of the novel, Carton manages to change places with Lucie's husband, Charles Darnay, hours before Darnay's scheduled execution in France, giving his life for Lucie's sake. Later, Lucie and Charles name their second son after Carton.

== Carton's character ==
Sydney Carton is introduced into the novel A Tale of Two Cities as a young, sloppy, but brilliant barrister who bears an uncanny likeness to Charles Darnay (whose original name is Charles St. Evrémonde), the prisoner he is helping to defend. He uses his great skill in law and charisma to save Darnay from execution for espionage against England, though he lets his colleague Stryver do all the talking in court, and Stryver takes all the glory for saving Darnay. Carton summoned Darnay to accompany him to a tavern immediately upon the acquitted prisoner's escape. During an early dinner in which Darnay devours a hearty non-prison meal and Carton drinks several bottles of wine, Carton admits that he both likes and hates his client, as he considers him as everything that he should be but is not. "I am a disappointed drudge, sir," Carton explains. "I care for no man on earth, and no man on earth cares for me."

In a later conversation with his partner Mr. Stryver, the narrator calls Carton a "jackal" because while Mr. Stryver very deftly presents each case and gains all the credit, it is Carton's legal acumen which helps them win, referencing how jackals help lions with kills while the lions take all the glory. Several scenes make it clear that Carton is an alcoholic filled with cynicism and self-hatred due to what he sees as his wasted and empty life.

Lucie Manette and Charles Darnay eventually marry, increasing Carton's self-loathing all the more, as he had developed an unrequited love for her. In an uncharacteristic fit of sincerity, he respectfully admits his feelings to Lucie, saying that though he considers himself unworthy of her affection, she has nevertheless inspired him to try to make something of his life. He ends the conversation by saying that he will never speak of it again, asks her to keep his confession secret and pledges to do anything for her or for anybody she loves. He is able to create and maintain a friendship with Darnay, and becomes a welcome, although infrequent, guest at the Darnay house. After the birth of Charles and Lucie's daughter, Carton becomes the child's favorite and remains so as she grows up.

Several years later, Darnay returns to France to assist a former servant who had been jailed during the French Revolution. However, this is the time of the Reign of Terror, and Darnay is arrested and eventually sentenced to death for being an aristocrat, although he had long before cut off relations with the Evrémonde family. Carton follows Lucie and Dr. Manette to France and, in a wine shop, overhears Madame Defarge planning to denounce Lucie and her father on the same day that Darnay is to be executed (Lucie and her father would certainly mourn Darnay's death, and under the new laws of the Republic it is a criminal offense punishable by death to mourn the death of an "aristo"). This spurs Carton into action; he arranges for Lucie, her daughter, and her father to escape Paris, and just hours before Darnay's scheduled execution by guillotine Carton smuggles himself into Darnay's prison cell, renders Darnay unconscious, and trades places with him, both for the sake of their friendship and for Lucie. Then he arranges to have Darnay carried to Lucie's waiting carriage while he stoically prepares to face the guillotine.

Carton's last action in his life is to give strength and comfort to a seamstress who is also about to be executed. Carton's final words – or rather, what Dickens suggests could have been his final words, had he been given the time to verbalize his final thoughts – are among the most famous in English literature:

It is a far, far better thing that I do, than I have ever done; it is a far, far better rest that I go to than I have ever known.

— A Tale of Two Cities. Literature.org: The Online Literature Source. Book 3, chapter 15

Later, Lucie and Charles have a son, whom they name Sydney, who will follow his namesake into the law profession to both make his name "illustrious", eventually remove the stains on Sydney Carton's name and reputation and pass on to his own children the story of Sydney Carton's sacrifice "in a tender and faltering voice."

== Influence in other works ==
The character of Carton – along with A Tale of Two Cities as a whole – has been influential on several works of literature:

- A Far Better Rest (2000) by American author Susanne Alleyn is a retelling of A Tale of Two Cities from Carton's perspective, including the story of his entire life, and explaining his resemblance to Darnay by making them (unknowingly) half-brothers.
- A Far Better Thing (2025) by H. G. Parry is a retelling of A Tale of Two Cities told from Carton's perspective in which Darnay is Carton's fairy changeling.
- The historical novel The Carton Chronicles: The Curious Tale of Flashman's True Father (2010) by Keith Laidler imagines that Sydney Carton had a last-minute change of heart, escaped the guillotine and went on to work as a spy for Robespierre while attempting to win Lucie Manette's heart. In his narrative Carton also confesses to being the real father of Harry Flashman, the roguish hero of the series of books created by George MacDonald Fraser, who in turn borrowed him from Tom Brown's Schooldays by Thomas Hughes.
- In the young adult series The Infernal Devices (2013) by Cassandra Clare, the final installment in the Clockwork Princess series is said to be a loose retelling of A Tale of Two Cities. One of the series' main protagonists, William "Will" Herondale, often quotes Sydney Carton. As he believed he was cursed that those who love him would die in the second book, he sees himself as being like Sydney Carton because of what he erroneously believes to be his unrequited love towards Theresa "Tessa" Gray. He cannot be with her, however, as she is engaged to his best friend, or Parabatai (meaning "bound warrior"), James "Jem" Carstairs. Though Will and Jem do seem to swap places in the end of the story, Will goes on to marry Tessa while Jem "dies" from his illness, actually going on to become a Silent Brother. He and Tessa can no longer be together due to Silent Brothers not being allowed to marry. The story takes place in Victorian London, 100 years after the events of Dickens' novel.
- Tell the Wind and Fire (2016), a novel by Irish author Sarah Rees Brennan, is a modern retelling by A Tale of Two Cities with Light and Dark magicians in a Light and a Dark New York, with Lucie Manette as the protagonist; Ethan Stryker here represents Darnay, with his magically-created doppelganger Carwyn as Sydney Carton.
- P. G. Wodehouse, in The Code of the WoostersThe Code of the Woosters, invokes the heroic sacrifice of Sidney Carton on four occasions as a humorous counterpoint to Bertie Wooster's trivial predicaments.
- "The Ongoing Story", a poem by John Ashbery, makes direct reference to the character.

On film and television, Sydney Carton has been portrayed by:

- Maurice Costello (film, 1911)
- William Farnum (film, 1917)
- Clive Brook (film, 1922)
- Ronald Colman (film, 1935)
- Wendell Corey (TV, 1953)
- Peter Wyngarde (TV/BBC, 1957)
- Dirk Bogarde (film, 1958)
- John Wood (TV/BBC, 1965)
- Paul Shelley (TV/BBC, 1980)
- Chris Sarandon (TV, 1980)
- James Wilby (TV/BBC, 1989)
- Kit Harington (TV/BBC, 2026)

On radio, he has been portrayed by Orson Welles, Charles Dance and Paul Ready.

Carton's final speech is quoted in the film Star Trek II: The Wrath of Khan in reference to Spock's sacrifice. It is used in a similar fashion in The Dark Knight Rises as part of Bruce Wayne's eulogy, read by Jim Gordon.
