= Miss Pross =

Fictional character created by Charles Dickens

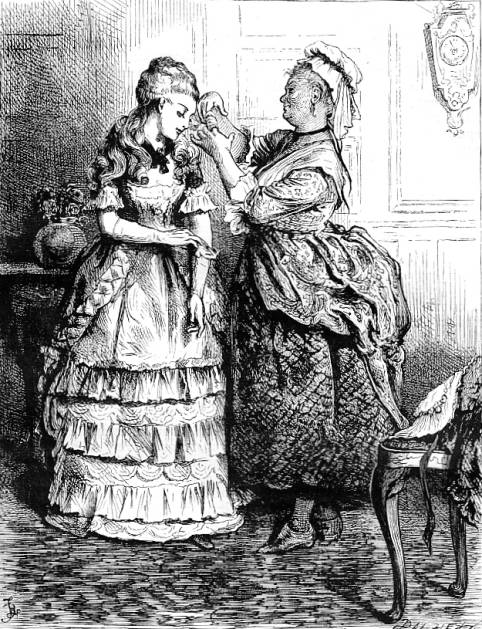
Miss Pross (right) and Lucie by Fred Barnard, 1870s

Miss Pross is a character in Charles Dickens' 1859 novel A Tale of Two Cities.

Miss Pross is the no-nonsense governess and friend of Lucie Manette. She is also the sister of Solomon Pross (later revealed to be the spy known as John Barsad).

She accompanies Lucie to Dover when Lucie goes to France to retrieve her father, Dr. Alexandre Manette, after his release from the Bastille, but her stout English patriotism causes her to stay in England. She is Lucie's constant companion accompanying her to the trial of Charles Darnay, to church, to just about everything. She is Lucie's shadow and protector, and overcomes her dislike of everything not English to accompany Lucie to France when her husband Charles Darnay is arrested in Paris as an aristocrat. After Charles has been rescued and the rest of the family has departed for England, Miss Pross confronts Madame Defarge, who had come to their lodgings to capture Lucie and her young daughter. In the struggle that ensues, Madame Defarge's pistol goes off, killing herself. Miss Pross leaves Madame Defarge's body there and escapes with Jerry Cruncher, but the psychological shock and the sound of the gun cause her to go deaf.

== Reception ==
Teresa Mangan has explored underlying similarities between Miss Pross and Madame Defarge: both women kill in the name of other women whom they love (Pross fights to save Lucie, whereas Defarge seeks revenge for crimes committed by Darnay's family against her dead sister). She concludes that:

"Miss Pross has also suffered as a stereotype. At best, she is held up as Madame’s antithesis (when Lucie is not positioned in that role). At worst, she is that “woman of a certain age,” a spinster, the literary equivalent of a quirky and amusing character actor of theatre and later film. Even within the constraints of her tertiary role, however, Miss Pross complicates this tale of two cities. Without the respectable, all-consuming outlet of loving Lucie, how like Madame Defarge Miss Pross might be."

== Portrayal in other media ==
- In the 1935 film A Tale of Two Cities, Miss Pross is played by Edna May Oliver.
- In the 1958 film A Tale of Two Cities, Miss Pross is played by Athene Seyler.
- In the 2008 Broadway musical adaptation of A Tale of Two Cities, Miss Pross is played by Katherine McGrath.
