= A Tale of Two Cities =

1859 novel by Charles Dickens

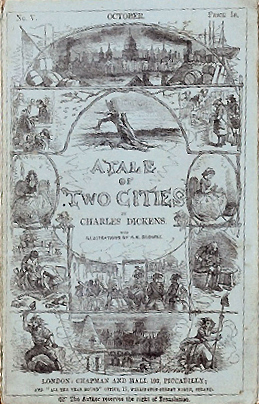
- Cover of serial Vol. V, 1859
- Author: Charles Dickens
- Illustrator: Hablot Knight Browne (Phiz)
- Cover artist: Hablot Knight Browne (Phiz)
- Language: English
- Genre: Historical novel
- Set in: London and Paris, 1775–93
- Published: Weekly serial April – November 1859; Book 1859
- Publisher: London: Chapman & Hall
- Publication place: England
- Dewey Decimal: 823.8
- LC Class: PR4571 .A1
- Preceded by: Little Dorrit
- Followed by: Great Expectations
- Text: A Tale of Two Cities at Wikisource

A Tale of Two Cities is a historical novel published in 1859 by the English author Charles Dickens, set in London and Paris before and during the French Revolution. The novel tells the story of the French Doctor Manette, his 18-year-long imprisonment in the Bastille in Paris, and his release to live in London with his daughter Lucie whom he had never met. The story is set against the conditions that led up to the French Revolution and the Reign of Terror.

A Tale of Two Cities, Dickens's best-known work of historical fiction, is said to be one of the best selling novels of all time. In 2003, the novel was ranked 63rd on the BBC's The Big Read poll. The novel has been adapted for film, television, radio, and the stage, and has continued to influence popular culture.

== Synopsis ==
=== Book the First: Recalled to Life ===
==== Opening lines ====
Dickens opens the novel with a sentence that has become famous:

It was the best of times, it was the worst of times, it was the age of wisdom, it was the age of foolishness, it was the epoch of belief, it was the epoch of incredulity, it was the season of Light, it was the season of Darkness, it was the spring of hope, it was the winter of despair, we had everything before us, we had nothing before us, we were all going direct to Heaven, we were all going direct the other way—in short, the period was so far like the present period, that some of its noisiest authorities insisted on its being received, for good or for evil, in the superlative degree of comparison only.

==== Plot of the first book ====
In 1775, Jerry Cruncher flags down the nightly mail-coach en route from London to Dover. Cruncher is an employee of Tellson's Bank in London; he carries a message for Jarvis Lorry, one of the bank's managers. Lorry sends Jerry back with the cryptic response "Recalled to Life", referring to Alexandre Manette, a French physician who has been released from the Bastille after an 18-year imprisonment. On arrival in Dover, Lorry meets Dr Manette's daughter Lucie and her governess, Miss Pross. Believing her father to be dead, Lucie faints at the news that he is alive. Lorry takes her to France for a reunion.

In the Paris neighbourhood of the Faubourg Saint-Antoine, Dr Manette has been given lodgings by his former servant Ernest Defarge and his wife Therese, the owners of a wine shop. Lorry and Lucie find him in a small garret where he spends much of his time distractedly and obsessively making shoes – a skill he learned in prison. Lorry and Lucie take him back to England.

=== Book the Second: The Golden Thread ===
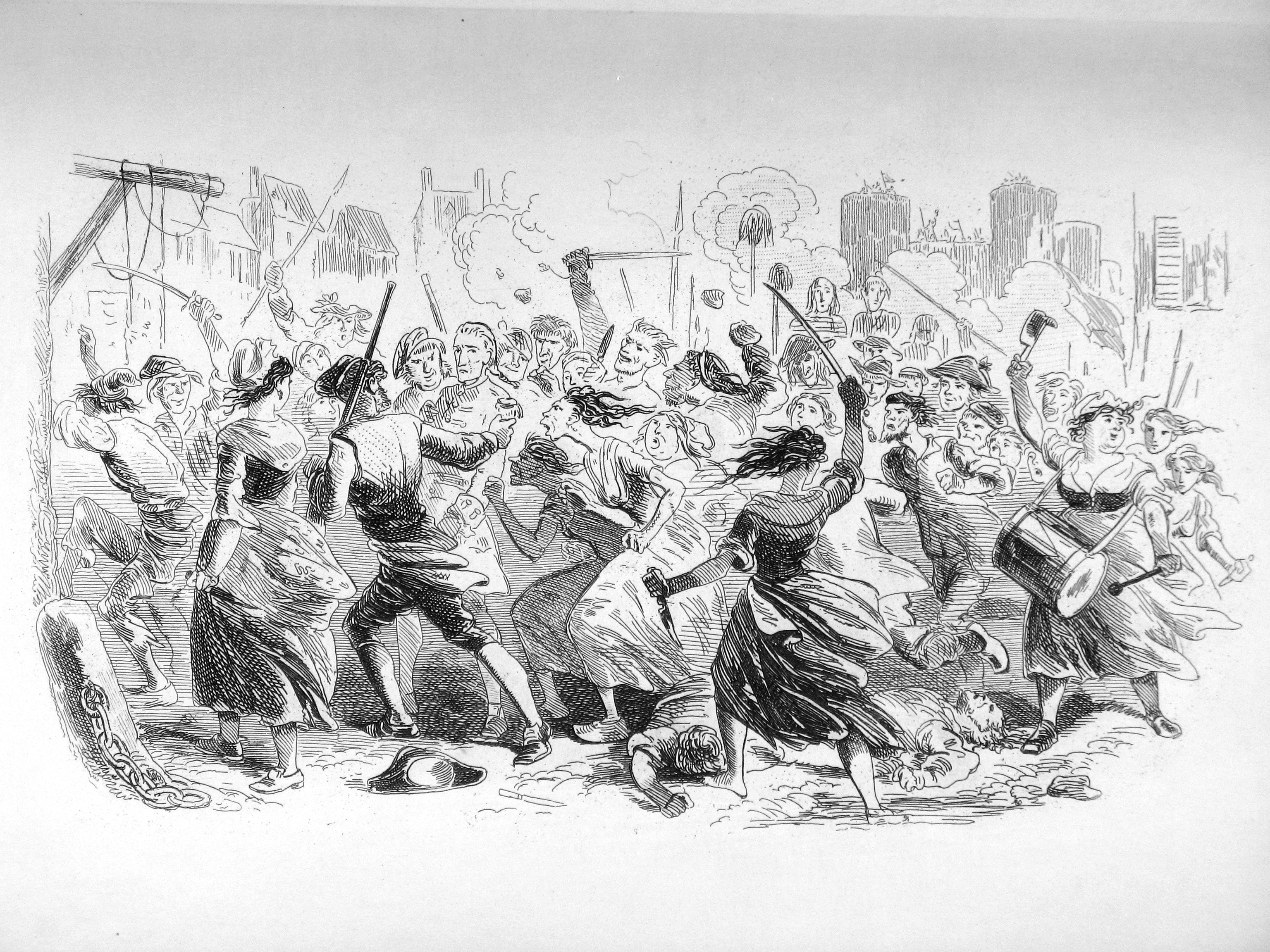
"The Sea Still Rises", an illustration for Book 2, Chapter 22 by "Phiz"

==== Plot of the second book ====
In 1780, French émigré Charles Darnay is on trial in London for treason against the British Crown. The key witnesses against him are two British spies, John Barsad and Roger Cly. Barsad claims that he would recognise Darnay anywhere, but Darnay's lawyer points out that his colleague in court, Sydney Carton, bears a strong resemblance to the prisoner. With Barsad's testimony thus undermined, Darnay is acquitted.

In Paris, the hated and abusive Marquis St. Evrémonde orders his carriage to be driven recklessly fast through the crowded streets, hitting and killing a child. The Marquis contemptuously tosses a coin at the child's father, Gaspard, to compensate him for his loss; as the Marquis drives on, the coin is flung back into the carriage.

Arriving at his country château, the Marquis meets Darnay, his nephew and heir. Out of disdain for his aristocratic family the nephew has replaced his surname (St. Evrémonde) with Darnay, an anglicised version of his mother's maiden name (D'Aulnais). He despises the Marquis' views that "Repression is the only lasting philosophy. The dark deference of fear and slavery ... will keep the dogs obedient to the whip, as long as this roof [looking up to it] shuts out the sky." That night, Gaspard creeps into the château and stabs and kills the Marquis in his sleep. He avoids capture for nearly a year, but is eventually hanged in the nearby village.

In London, Carton confesses his love to Lucie, but quickly recognises that she does not love him. He nevertheless promises to "embrace any sacrifice for you and for those dear to you". Darnay asks for Dr Manette's permission to wed Lucie, and he agrees. On the morning of the marriage, Darnay reveals his real name and lineage to Dr Manette, facts that Manette had asked him to withhold until that day. The unexpected revelation causes Dr Manette to revert to his obsessive shoemaking. He returns to sanity before their return from honeymoon, and the whole incident is kept secret from Lucie.

As the years pass, Lucie and Charles raise a family in England: a son (who dies in childhood) and a daughter, little Lucie. Lorry finds a second home with them. Carton, though he seldom visits, is accepted as a close friend and becomes a special favourite of little Lucie.

In Paris in July 1789, the Defarges help to lead the storming of the Bastille, a symbol of royal tyranny. Defarge enters Dr Manette's former cell and searches it thoroughly. Throughout the countryside, local officials and other representatives of the aristocracy are slaughtered, and the St. Evrémonde château is burned to the ground.

In 1792, Lorry travels to France to save important documents stored at Tellson's Paris branch from the chaos of the French Revolution. Darnay receives a letter from Gabelle, one of his uncle's former servants who has been imprisoned by the revolutionaries, pleading for Darnay (now the Marquis St. Evrémonde) to help secure his release. Without telling his family or revealing his position as the new marquis, Darnay also sets out for Paris.

=== Book the Third: The Track of a Storm ===
==== Plot of the third book ====
On his way to Paris, Darnay is arrested as a returning emigrated aristocrat and jailed in La Force Prison. Hoping to be able to save him, Dr Manette, Lucie and her daughter, Jerry, and Miss Pross all move to Paris and take up lodgings near those of Lorry.

Fifteen months later Darnay is finally tried, and Dr Manette – viewed as a popular hero after his long imprisonment in the Bastille – testifies on his behalf. Darnay is acquitted and released, but is re-arrested later that day.

While running errands with Jerry, Miss Pross is amazed to run into her long-lost brother Solomon. Now posing as a Frenchman, he is an employee of the revolutionary authorities and one of Darnay's gaolers. Carton also recognises him – as Barsad, one of the spies who tried to frame Darnay at his trial in 1780. Solomon is desperate to keep his true identity hidden, and Carton blackmails him into helping with a play by threatening to denounce him as an English spy.

Darnay's retrial the following day is based on new denunciations by the Defarges and on a manuscript that Defarge had found in Dr Manette's Bastille cell. Defarge reads the manuscript to the tribunal. In it, Dr Manette had recorded that his imprisonment was at the hands of the Evrémonde brothers (Darnay's father and uncle) after he had tried to report their crimes. Darnay's uncle had kidnapped and raped a peasant girl. Her brother, first hiding his remaining younger sister, had gone to confront the uncle, who ran him through with his sword. In spite of the best efforts of Dr Manette, both the elder sister and the brother died. Dr Manette's manuscript concludes by denouncing the Evrémondes, "them and their descendants, to the last of their race." The jury takes that as irrefutable proof of Darnay's guilt, and he is condemned to die by the guillotine the next afternoon.

In the Defarges' wine shop, Carton discovers that Madame Defarge is the surviving sister of the peasant family, and he overhears her planning to denounce Lucie and her daughter. He visits Lorry and warns him that Lucie and her family must be ready to flee the next day. He extracts a promise that they will be waiting for him at 2 pm, ready to leave the instant he returns.

Shortly before the executions are due to begin, Carton puts his plan into effect. With Barsad's reluctant assistance, he gains access to Darnay's prison cell. Carton drugs his lookalike and swaps places with him. Then he has Barsad carry Darnay out to the carriage, where Lorry and the family are awaiting Carton. They flee to England with Darnay.

Meanwhile, Madame Defarge goes to Lucie's lodgings, hoping to apprehend her and her daughter. There she finds Miss Pross, who is waiting for Jerry so they can follow the family out of Paris. The two women struggle and Madame Defarge's pistol discharges, killing her and permanently deafening Miss Pross.

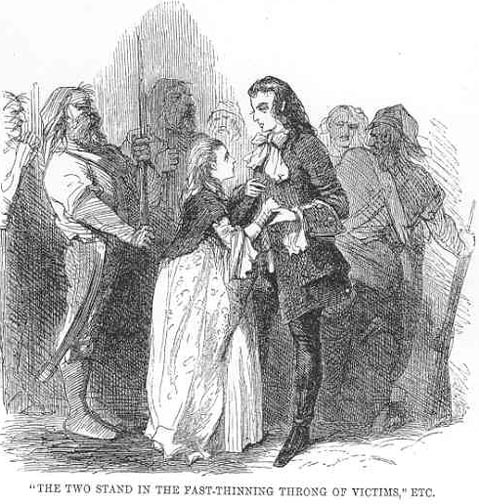
The seamstress and Carton, an illustration for Book 3, Chapter 15 by John McLenan (1859)

As Carton waits to board the tumbril that will take him to his execution, he is approached by another prisoner, a seamstress. Carton comforts her, telling her that their ends will be quick and that the worries of their lives will not follow them into "the better land where ... [they] will be mercifully sheltered." A final prophetic thought runs through his mind in which he visualises a better future for the family and their descendants.

==== Closing lines ====
Dickens closes with Carton's final prophetic vision as he contemplates the guillotine:

I see Barsad, and Cly, Defarge, The Vengeance [a lieutenant of Madame Defarge], the Juryman, the Judge, long ranks of the new oppressors who have risen on the destruction of the old, perishing by this retributive instrument, before it shall cease out of its present use. I see a beautiful city and a brilliant people rising from this abyss, and, in their struggles to be truly free, in their triumphs and defeats, through long years to come, I see the evil of this time and of the previous time of which this is the natural birth, gradually making expiation for itself and wearing out.

I see the lives for which I lay down my life, peaceful, useful, prosperous and happy, in that England which I shall see no more. I see Her with a child upon her bosom, who bears my name. I see her father, aged and bent, but otherwise restored, and faithful to all men in his healing office, and at peace. I see the good old man [Lorry], so long their friend, in ten years' time enriching them with all he has, and passing tranquilly to his reward.

I see that I hold a sanctuary in their hearts, and in the hearts of their descendants, generations hence. I see her, an old woman, weeping for me on the anniversary of this day. I see her and her husband, their course done, lying side by side in their last earthly bed, and I know that each was not more honoured and held sacred in the other's soul than I was in the souls of both.

I see that child who lay upon her bosom and who bore my name, a man winning his way up in that path of life which once was mine. I see him winning it so well, that my name is made illustrious there by the light of his. I see the blots I threw upon it, faded away. I see him, fore-most of just judges and honoured men, bringing a boy of my name, with a forehead that I know and golden hair, to this place—then fair to look upon, with not a trace of this day's disfigurement—and I hear him tell the child my story, with a tender and a faltering voice.

It is a far, far better thing that I do, than I have ever done; it is a far, far better rest that I go to than I have ever known.

== Characters ==
In order of appearance:

=== Book the First ===
Chapter 2

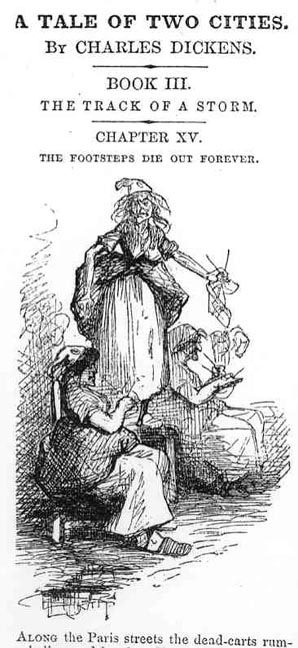
Illustration from a serialised edition of the story, showing three tricoteuses knitting, with the Vengeance standing in the centre.

- Jerry Cruncher: Porter and messenger for Tellson's Bank and secret "Resurrection Man" (body-snatcher); though rough and abusive towards his wife, he provides courageous service to the Manettes in Book the Third. His first name is short for Jeremiah; the latter name shares a meaning with the name of Jarvis Lorry.
- Jarvis Lorry: A manager at Tellson's Bank: "...a gentleman of 60 ... Very orderly and methodical he looked ... He had a good leg, and was a little vain of it..." He is a dear friend of Dr Manette and serves as a sort of trustee and guardian of the Manette family. The bank places him in charge of the Paris branch during the Revolution, putting him in position to provide life-saving service to the Manettes in Book the Third. The end of the book reveals that he lives to be 88.

Chapter 4

- Lucie Manette: Daughter of Dr Manette; an ideal pre-Victorian lady, perfect in every way. About 17 when the novel begins, she is described as short and slight with a "pretty figure, a quantity of golden hair, a pair of blue eyes..." Although Sydney Carton is in love with her, he declares himself an unsuitable candidate for her hand in marriage and instead she marries Charles Darnay, with whom she is very much in love, and bears him a daughter. However, Lucie genuinely cares about Carton's welfare and defends him when he is criticised by others. She is the "golden thread" after whom Book the Second is named, so called because she holds her father's and her family's lives together (and because of her blonde hair like her mother's). She also ties nearly every character in the book together.

Chapter 5

- Monsieur Defarge: Given name Ernest, he is the owner of a Paris wine shop and leader of the Jacquerie. "A bull-necked, martial-looking man of thirty ... He was a dark man altogether, with good eyes and a good bold breadth between them." He is devoted to Dr Manette, having been his servant as a youth. One of the key Revolutionary leaders, in which he is known as Jacques Four, he embraces the Revolution as a noble cause, unlike many other revolutionaries. Though he truly believes in the principles of the Revolution, Defarge is far more moderate than some of the other participants (notably his wife).
- Madame Defarge: Given name Thérèse; a vengeful Revolutionary, she is arguably the novel's antagonist and is presented as a more extreme and bloodthirsty personality than her husband Ernest. "There were many women at that time, upon whom the time laid a dreadfully disfiguring hand; but, there was not one among them more to be dreaded than this ruthless woman ... Of a strong and fearless character, of shrewd sense and readiness, of great determination, of that kind of beauty which not only seems to impart to its possessor firmness and animosity, but to strike into others an instinctive recognition of those qualities." The source of her implacable hatred of the Evrémonde family is revealed late in the novel to be the rape of her sister and killing of her brother when she was a child.
- Jacques One, Two, and Three: Revolutionary compatriots of Ernest Defarge. Jacques Three is especially bloodthirsty and serves as a juryman on the Revolutionary Tribunals.

Chapter 6

- Dr Alexandre Manette: Lucie's father; when the book opens, he has just been released after a ghastly 18 years as a prisoner in the Bastille. Weak, afraid of sudden noises, barely able to carry on a conversation, he is taken in by his faithful former servant Defarge who then turns him over to Jarvis Lorry and the daughter he has never met. He achieves recovery and contentment with her, her eventual husband Charles Darnay, and their little daughter. All his happiness is put at risk in Book the Third when Madame Defarge resolves to send Evrémonde/Darnay to the guillotine, regardless of his having renounced the Evrémondes' wealth and cruelty. At the same time, the reader learns the cause of Dr Manette's imprisonment: he had rendered medical care to Madame Defarge's brother and sister following the injuries inflicted on them by the Evrémonde twins back in 1757; the Evrémondes decided he couldn't be allowed to expose them.

=== Book the Second ===
Chapter 1

- Mrs. Cruncher: Wife of Jerry Cruncher. She is a very religious woman, but her husband, somewhat paranoid, claims she is praying (what he calls "flopping") against him, and that is why he does not often succeed at work. Jerry often verbally and, almost as often, physically abuses her, but at the end of the story, he appears to feel somewhat guilty about this.
- Young Jerry Cruncher: Son of Jerry and Mrs. Cruncher. Young Jerry often follows his father around to his father's odd jobs, and at one point in the story, follows his father at night and discovers that his father is a Resurrection Man. Young Jerry looks up to his father as a role model and aspires to become a Resurrection Man himself when he grows up.

Chapter 2

- Charles Darnay: A Frenchman of the noble Evrémonde family; "...a young man of about five-and-twenty, well-grown and well-looking, with a sunburnt cheek and a dark eye." When introduced, he is on trial for his life at the Old Bailey on charges of spying on behalf of the French crown. In disgust at the cruelty of his family to the French peasantry, he took on the name "Darnay" (after his mother's maiden name, D'Aulnais) and left France for England. He and Lucie Manette fall deeply in love, they marry, and she gives birth to a daughter. He exhibits an admirable honesty in his decision to reveal to Dr Manette his true identity as a member of the infamous Evrémonde family. He puts his family's happiness at risk with his courageous decision to return to Paris to save the imprisoned Gabelle, who, unbeknownst to him, has been coerced into luring him there. Once in Paris, he is stunned to discover that, regardless of his rejection of his family's exploitative and abusive record, he is imprisoned incommunicado simply for being an aristocrat. Released after the testimony of Dr Manette, he is re-arrested and sentenced to be guillotined owing to Madame Defarge's undying hatred of all Evrémondes. This death sentence provides the pretext for the novel's climax.

Chapter 3

- John Barsad (real name Solomon Pross): An informer in London and later employed by the Marquis St. Evrémonde. When introduced at Charles Darnay's trial, he is giving damning evidence against the defendant but it becomes clear to the reader that he is an oily, untrustworthy character. Moving to Paris he takes service as a police spy in the Saint Antoine district, under the French monarchy. Following the Revolution, he becomes an agent for Revolutionary France (at which point he must hide his British identity). Although a man of low character, his position as a spy allows him to arrange for Sydney Carton's final heroic act (after Carton blackmails him with revealing his duplicity).
- Roger Cly: Barsad's collaborator in spying and giving questionable testimony. Following his chaotic funeral procession in Book the Second, Chapter 14, his coffin is dug up by Jerry Cruncher and his fellow Resurrection Men. In Book the Third, Jerry Cruncher reveals that in fact the casket contained only rocks and that Cly was clearly still alive and no doubt carrying on his spying activities.
- Mr Stryver: An ambitious barrister, senior partner to Sydney Carton. "... a man of little more than thirty, but looking twenty years older than he was, stout, loud, red, bluff, and free from any drawback of delicacy..."; he wants to marry Lucie Manette because he believes that she is attractive enough. However, he is not truly in love with her and in fact treats her condescendingly. Jarvis Lorry suggests that marrying Lucie would be unwise and Stryver, after thinking it over, talks himself out of it, later marrying a rich widow instead.
- Sydney Carton: A quick-minded and highly intelligent but depressed English barrister, referred to by Dickens as "The Jackal" because of his deference to Stryver. When introduced, he is a hard-drinking cynic, having watched Stryver advance while never taking advantage of his own considerable gifts: Dickens writes that the sun rose "upon no sadder sight than the man of good abilities and good emotions, incapable of their directed exercise, incapable of his own help and his own happiness, sensible to the blight on him, and resigning himself to let it eat him away". In love with Lucie Manette, she cares about him but more as a concerned mother figure than a potential mate. He ultimately becomes a selfless hero, redeeming everything by sacrificing his life for a worthy cause.

Chapter 6

- Miss Pross: Lucie Manette's governess since Lucie was 10 years old: "... one of those unselfish creatures—found only among women—who will, for pure love and admiration, bind themselves willing slaves, to youth when they have lost it, to beauty that they never had..." She is fiercely loyal to Lucie and to England. She believes her long-lost brother Solomon, now the spy and perjurer John Barsad, is "the one man worthy of Ladybird," ignoring the fact that he "was a heartless scoundrel who had stripped her of everything she possessed, as a stake to speculate with, and had abandoned her in her poverty for evermore..." She is not afraid to physically fight those she believes are endangering the people she loves. She permanently loses her hearing when the fatal pistol shot goes off during her climactic fight with Madame Defarge.

Chapter 7

It took four men, all four a-blaze with gorgeous decoration, and the Chief of them unable to exist with fewer than two gold watches in his pocket, emulative of the noble and chaste fashion set by Monseigneur, to conduct the happy chocolate to Monseigneur's lips.

It was impossible for Monseigneur to dispense with one of these attendants on the chocolate and hold his high place under the admiring Heavens. Deep would have been the blot upon his escutcheon if his chocolate had been ignobly waited on by only three men; he must have died of two.

And who among the company at Monseigneur's reception in that seventeen hundred and eightieth year of our Lord, could possibly doubt, that a system rooted in a frizzled hangman, powdered, gold-laced, pumped, and white-silk stockinged, would see the very stars out!

- "Monseigneur": An unnamed generic aristocrat whose extraordinary decadence and self-absorption, described in detail, are used by Dickens to characterise the ancien régime in general. "The leprosy of unreality disfigured every human creature in attendance upon Monseigneur." His fellow nobles also luxuriate in vast wealth, but this does not inoculate them from feeling envy and resentment: as the Marquis St. Evrémonde leaves Monseigneur's house "with his hat under his arm and his snuff-box in his hand", he turns to the latter's bedroom and quietly says, "I devote you ... to the Devil!" When the Revolution begins, Monseigneur puts on his cook's clothing and ignominiously flees, escaping with only his life.
- Marquis St. Evrémonde: Uncle of Charles Darnay: "...a man of about sixty, handsomely dressed, haughty in manner, and with a face like a fine mask." Determined to preserve the traditional prerogatives of the nobility until the end of his life, he is the twin brother of Charles Darnay's late father; both men were exceptionally arrogant and cruel to peasants. Lamenting reforms which have imposed some restraints on the abusive powers of his class, the Marquis is out of favour at the royal court at the time of his assassination. Murdered in his bed by the peasant Gaspard.
- Gaspard: A peasant whose child is run over and killed by the Marquis St. Evrémonde's carriage. He plunges a knife into Evrémonde's heart, pinning a note that reads, "Drive him fast to his tomb," a reference to the careless speed that caused his little child's death. After being in hiding for a year, he is found, arrested, and executed.
- The Mender of Roads: A peasant who later works as a woodsawyer; the Defarges bring him into a conspiracy against the aristocracy, where he is referred to as Jacques Five.

Chapter 8

- Théophile Gabelle: Gabelle is "the Postmaster, and some other taxing functionary, united" for the tenants of the Marquis St. Evrémonde. Gabelle is imprisoned by the revolutionaries, and his beseeching letter brings Darnay to France. Gabelle is "named after the hated salt tax".

=== Book the Third ===
Chapter 3

- The Vengeance: A companion of Madame Defarge referred to as her "shadow" and lieutenant, a member of the sisterhood of women revolutionaries in Saint Antoine, and Revolutionary zealot. (Many Frenchmen and women did change their names to show their enthusiasm for the Revolution.) Carton predicts that the Vengeance, Defarge, Cly, and Barsad will be consumed by the Revolution and end up on the guillotine.

Chapter 13

- The Seamstress: "...a young woman, with a slight girlish form, a sweet spare face in which there was no vestige of colour, and large widely opened patient eyes..." Having been caught up in The Terror, she strikes up a conversation with the man she assumes is Evrémonde in the large room where the next day's guillotine victims are gathered. When she realises that another man has taken Charles Darnay's place, she admires his sacrifice and asks if she can hold his hand during their tumbril ride to the place of execution.

== Sources ==
While performing in The Frozen Deep, Dickens was given a play to read called The Dead Heart by Watts Phillips which had the historical setting, the basic storyline, and the climax that Dickens used in A Tale of Two Cities. The play was produced while A Tale of Two Cities was being serialised in All the Year Round and led to talk of plagiarism.

Other sources are The French Revolution: A History by Thomas Carlyle (especially important for the novel's rhetoric and symbolism); Zanoni by Edward Bulwer-Lytton; The Castle Spector by Matthew Lewis; Travels in France by Arthur Young; and Tableau de Paris by Louis-Sébastien Mercier. Dickens also used material from an account of imprisonment during the Terror by Beaumarchais, and records of the trial of a French spy published in The Annual Register.

Research published in The Dickensian in 1963 suggests that the house at 1 Greek Street, now The House of St Barnabas, forms the basis for Dr Manette and Lucie's London house.

In a building at the back, attainable by a courtyard where a plane tree rustled its green leaves, church organs claimed to be made, and likewise gold to be beaten by some mysterious giant who had a golden arm starting out of the wall ... as if he had beaten himself precious.

The "golden arm" (an arm-and-hammer symbol, an ancient sign of the gold-beater's craft) is now housed at the Charles Dickens Museum, but a modern replica could be seen sticking out of the wall near the Pillars of Hercules pub at the western end of Manette Street (formerly Rose Street), until this building was demolished in 2017.

== Publication history ==
The 45-chapter novel was published in 31 weekly instalments in Dickens's new literary periodical titled All the Year Round. From April to November 1859, Dickens also republished the chapters as eight monthly sections in green covers. All but three of Dickens's previous novels had appeared as monthly instalments prior to publication as books. The first weekly instalment of A Tale of Two Cities ran in the first issue of All the Year Round on 30 April 1859. The last ran 30 weeks later, on 26 November.

The Telegraph and The Guardian claim that it is one of the best-selling novels of all time. WorldCat listed 1,529 editions of the work, including 1,305 print editions.

== Analysis ==
A Tale of Two Cities is one of Dickens's two works of historical fiction (with Barnaby Rudge).

Dickens uses literal translations of French idioms for characters who cannot speak English, such as "What the devil do you do in that galley there?!!" and "Where is my wife? ... Here you see me." The Penguin Classics edition of the novel notes that "Not all readers have regarded the experiment as a success."

J. L. Borges quipped: "Dickens lived in London. In his book A Tale of Two Cities, based on the French Revolution, we see that he really could not write a tale of two cities. He was a resident of just one city: London."

In the Introduction to the Encyclopedia of Adventure Fiction, critic Don D'Ammassa argues that it is an adventure novel because the protagonists are in constant danger of imprisonment or death.

=== Opening lines ===
Pairs of contrasting words in the opening lines have been interpreted to illustrate the social disparities between the French bourgeoisie and aristocracy around the time of the French Revolution. They may also act as a precursor to the book's theme of doubles.

=== Autobiographical material ===
Lucie Manette may reflect Dickens's relationship with eighteen-year-old actress Ellen Ternan, concerning which little is known for certain. The character has been noted as resembling Ternan physically.

After starring in a play by Wilkie Collins titled The Frozen Deep, Dickens was inspired to write Two Cities. In the play, Dickens played the part of a man who sacrifices his own life so that his rival may have the woman they both love; that love triangle became the basis for the relationships among Charles Darnay, Lucie Manette, and Sydney Carton.

Sydney Carton and Charles Darnay may bear importantly on Dickens's personal life. The plot hinges on the near-perfect resemblance between Sydney Carton and Charles Darnay; the two look so alike that Carton twice saves Darnay through others' inability to tell them apart. Carton is Darnay made bad. Carton suggests as much:

'Do you particularly like the man [Darnay]?' he muttered, at his own image [which he is regarding in a mirror]; 'why should you particularly like a man who resembles you? There is nothing in you to like; you know that. Ah, confound you! What a change you have made in yourself! A good reason for talking to a man, that he shows you what you have fallen away from and what you might have been! Change places with him, and would you have been looked at by those blue eyes [belonging to Lucie Manette] as he was, and commiserated by that agitated face as he was? Come on, and have it out in plain words! You hate the fellow.'

Charles Darnay shared Dickens's initials, a frequent property of his characters. Darnay's ambiguous fate may have been a reflection of Dickens's own insecurities.

Dickens dedicated the book to Whig and Liberal prime minister Lord John Russell: "In remembrance of many public services and private kindnesses."

== Contemporary criticisms ==
The reports published in the press were divergent. Thomas Carlyle was enthusiastic, which made the author "heartily delighted". On the other hand, Mrs. Oliphant found "little of Dickens" in the novel. The critic James Fitzjames Stephen called it a "dish of puppy pie and stewed cat which is not disguised by the cooking" and "a disjointed framework for the display of the tawdry wares, which are Mr Dickens's stock-in-trade".

== Adaptations ==
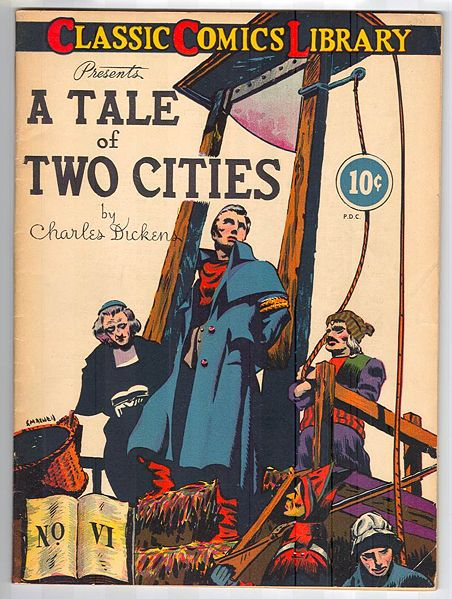
Classic Comics issue #6

=== Films ===
- A Tale of Two Cities, a 1911 silent film.
- A Tale of Two Cities, a 1917 silent film.
- A Tale of Two Cities, a 1922 silent film.
- The Only Way, a 1927 silent British film directed by Herbert Wilcox.
- A Tale of Two Cities, a 1935 black-and-white film starring Ronald Colman, Elizabeth Allan, Reginald Owen, Basil Rathbone, and Edna May Oliver, nominated for the Academy Award for Best Picture.
- A Tale of Two Cities, a 1958 version, starring Dirk Bogarde, Dorothy Tutin, Christopher Lee, Leo McKern, and Donald Pleasence.
- A Tale of Two Cities, a 1980 version, starring Chris Sarandon, Alice Krige and Kenneth More.

=== Radio ===
- On 8 April 1935, WCAE in Pittsburgh, Pennsylvania, presented A Tale of Two Cities "in chapter sequence" on Monday nights.
- On 25 July 1938, The Mercury Theatre on the Air produced a radio adaptation starring Orson Welles. Welles also starred in a version broadcast on Lux Radio Theater on 26 March 1945.
- Ronald Colman recreated his 1935 film role three times on radio: twice on the Lux Radio Theatre, first on 12 January 1942 with Edna Best and again on 18 March 1946 with Heather Angel, and once on the 9 March 1948 broadcast of Favorite Story (director Cecil B. DeMille's "favorite story").
- On 7 October 1943, a portion of the novel was adapted to the syndicated programme The Weird Circle as "Dr Manette's Manuscript."
- In 1950, the BBC broadcast a radio adaptation by Terence Rattigan and John Gielgud of their unproduced 1935 stage play.
- A half-hour version titled "Sydney Carton" was broadcast on 27 March 1954 on Theatre Royal hosted by and starring Laurence Olivier.
- In June 1989, BBC Radio 4 produced a seven-hour drama adapted for radio by Nick McCarty and directed by Ian Cotterell. This adaptation has been occasionally repeated by BBC Radio 7 and later BBC Radio 4 Extra (most recently in 2009). The cast included Charles Dance as Sydney Carton, Maurice Denham as Dr Manette, Richard Pasco as Mr Lorry, John Moffatt as Marquis St. Evrémonde, Charlotte Attenborough as Lucie Manette, John Duttine as Darnay, Aubrey Woods as Mr Stryver and Barbara Leigh-Hunt as Miss Pross. BBC Radio 4 produced a new five-part adaptation for radio by Mike Walker with original music by Lennert Busch and directed by Jessica Dromgoole and Jeremy Mortimer which won the 2012 Bronze Sony Radio Academy Award for Best Drama. The cast included Robert Lindsay as the voice of Charles Dickens, Paul Ready as Sydney Carton, Karl Johnson as Dr Manette, Lydia Wilson as Lucie Manette, Jonathan Coy as Mr Lorry, Andrew Scott as Darnay, Alison Steadman as Miss Pross and Clive Merrison as Marquis St. Evrémonde.
- In 2018, A Tale of Two Cities: Aleppo and London, a three-part adaptation of the Dickens novel written by Ayeesha Menon and directed by Polly Thomas was broadcast on BBC Radio 4, updating the story and characters to set it in modern-day London and war-torn Syria. The cast included Shaun Parker as Sid (Sydney Carton), Lara Sawalha as Lina (Lucie Manette), Fatima Adoum as Taghreed (Madame Defarge), Phil Davis as Jarvis (Mr Lorry), Khalid Abdalla as Shwan Dahkurdi (Charles Darnay) and Nadim Sawalha as Dr Mahmoud (Dr Manette).

=== Television ===
- ABC produced a two-part mini-series in 1953.
- The BBC produced an eight-part mini-series in 1957 starring Peter Wyngarde as Sydney Carton, Edward de Souza as Charles Darnay and Wendy Hutchinson as Lucie Manette.
- The BBC produced a ten-part mini-series in 1965 starring John Wood as Carton, Nicholas Pennell as Charles Darnay, Kika Markham as Lucie Manette and Patrick Troughton as Dr Manette.
- The BBC produced another eight-part mini-series in 1980 starring Paul Shelley as Carton/Darnay, Sally Osborne as Lucie Manette and Nigel Stock as Jarvis Lorry.
- A Tale of Two Cities, a 1984 TV animated version by Burbank Animation Studios.
- ITV Granada produced a two-part mini-series in 1989 starring James Wilby as Sydney Carton, Xavier Deluc as Charles Darnay and Serena Gordon as Lucie Manette. The production also aired on Masterpiece Theatre on PBS in the United States.
- The BBC and MGM+ produced a four-part mini-series that premiered on 6 September 2026 on MGM+, starring Kit Harington as Sydney Carton, François Civil as Charles Darnay and Mirren Mack as Lucie Manette.

=== Stage productions ===
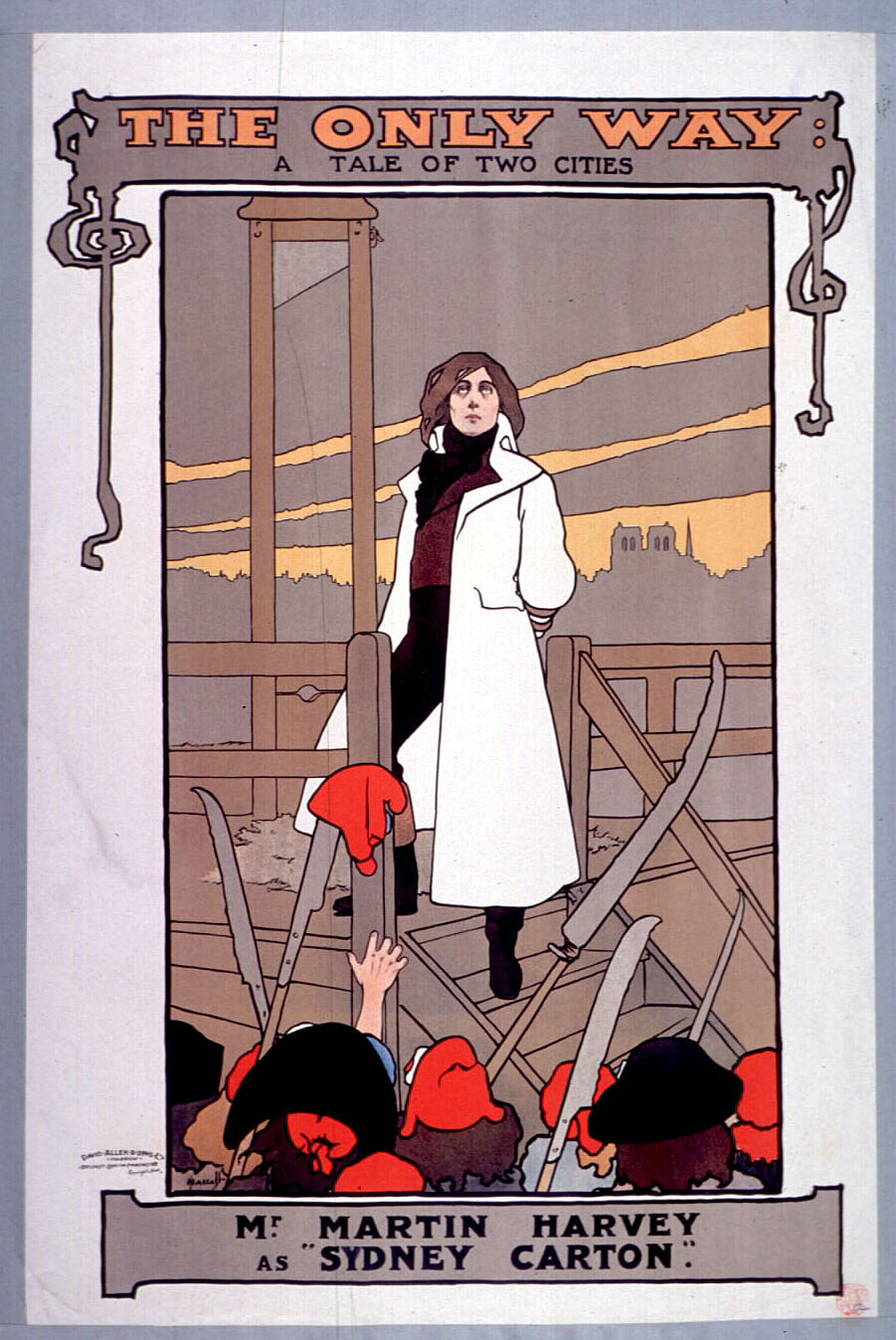
John Martin-Harvey as Sydney Carton (1899)

- Henry Irving's Lyceum Theatre company: The Only Way (1899), John Martin-Harvey as Sidney Carton
- Royal & Derngate Theatre produced an adaptation by Mike Poulton with original music by Rachel Portman, directed by James Dacre.
- The Regent's Park Open Air Theatre staged an adaptation by Matthew Dunster in 2017, directed by artistic director Timothy Sheader.
- The Marlowe Theatre produced an adaptation by Terence Rattigan and John Gielgud, directed by Michael Fentiman which opened in September 2026. The production then toured to select reigonal UK Theatres

=== Stage musicals ===
Stage musical adaptations of the novel include:

- Two Cities, the Spectacular New Musical (1968), with music by Jeff Wayne, lyrics by Jerry Wayne and starring Edward Woodward.
- A Tale of Two Cities (1998), with music by David Pomeranz and book by Steven David Horwich and David Soames. The musical was commissioned by Paul Nicholas and co-produced by Bill Kenwright ran at the New Alexandra Theatre in Birmingham during their 1998 Christmas season with Paul Nicholas as Sydney Carton.
- Two Cities (2006), a musical by Howard Goodall, which was set during the Russian Revolution, with the two cities being London and St. Petersburg.
- A Tale of Two Cities, a musical by Jill Santoriello, which opened on Broadway at the Al Hirschfeld Theatre on 18 September 2008. The production starred James Barbour as Sydney Carton, Natalie Toro as Madame Defarge and Brandi Burkhardt as Lucie Manette. The show was directed and choreographed by Warren Carlyle. Since Broadway, the show has been performed in the United States, Canada, United Kingdom, Germany, Japan and Korea.

=== Opera ===
- Arthur Benjamin's operatic version of the novel, subtitled Romantic Melodrama in Six Scenes, premiered on 17 April 1953, conducted by the composer. It received its stage premiere at Sadler's Wells on 22 July 1957, under the baton of Leon Lovett.

=== Fiction ===
- A Far Better Rest (2000) by Susanne Alleyn is a retelling of A Tale of Two Cities from Sydney Carton's perspective in which details of Carton's life missing from the original are included.
- A Far Better Thing (2025) by H. G. Parry is another retelling of A Tale of Two Cities from Sydney Carton's perspective in which Charles Darnay is Carton's fairy changeling.

=== Popular culture ===
- A Tale of Two Cities served as an inspiration to the 2012 Batman film The Dark Knight Rises by Christopher Nolan.

== Works cited ==
- A Tale of Two Cities Shmoop: Study Guides & Teacher Resources. Web. 12 March 2014.
- Biedermann, Hans. Dictionary of Symbolism. New York: Meridian (1994) ISBN 978-0-452-01118-2
- Dickens, Charles. A Tale of Two Cities. Edited and with an introduction and notes by Richard Maxwell. London: Penguin Classics (2003) ISBN 978-0-14-143960-0
- Drabble, Margaret, ed. The Oxford Companion to English Literature. 5th ed. Oxford, UK: Oxford University Press (1985) ISBN 0-19-866130-4
- Forster, E. M. Aspects of the Novel (1927). 2005 reprint: London: Penguin. ISBN 978-0-14-144169-6
- Orwell, George. "Charles Dickens". In A Collection of Essays. New York: Harcourt Brace Jovanovich (1946) ISBN 0-15-618600-4
- Rabkin, Eric. Masterpieces of the Imaginative Mind: Literature's Most Fantastic Works. Chantilly, VA: The Teaching Company (2007)
- Schlicke, Paul. Coffee With Dickens. London: Duncan Baird Publishers (2008) ISBN 978-1-84483-608-6
- A Tale of Two Cities: Character List SparkNotes: Today's Most Popular Study Guides. Web. 11 April 2011.
- Ackroyd, Peter. Dickens. London: HarperCollins (1990). ISBN 0-06-016602-9.
