= Jarvis Lorry =

Fictional character in Charles Dickens' A Tale of Two Cities

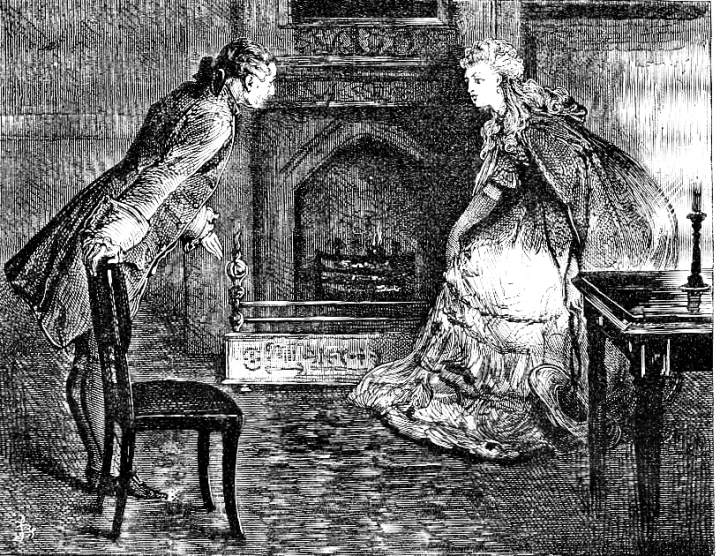
Jarvis Lorry and Lucie by Fred Barnard, in the 1870s

Jarvis Lorry is a character in Charles Dickens' 1859 novel, A Tale of Two Cities.

== Overview ==
Jarvis Lorry is one of the oldest employees of Tellson's Bank, and he frequently deals with the bank's offices in London and Paris. He is a confirmed bachelor and a man of business, describing himself as not much else than a speaking machine. He nevertheless shows an awkward sympathy towards Dr. Alexandre Manette and his daughter Lucie. While serving in Tellson's Paris office, Lorry takes the infant Lucie to safety in London after her father is imprisoned in the Bastille.

When the novel begins in 1775, the 60-year-old Lorry receives a message from Jerry Cruncher, another Tellson's employee, informing him of Dr. Manette's release. He escorts the now-adult Lucie to reunite with her father in Paris, but is troubled by what they will both find on their arrival, and brings them back to London. Five years later, when Charles Darnay is arrested on suspicion of treason against the British Crown, Lorry arranges for the barristers Stryver and Sydney Carton to defend him. Following Darnay's acquittal, Lorry becomes an intimate friend of the Manettes, and of Darnay when he marries Lucie.

In 1792, with the French Revolution ongoing, Lorry travels to Paris in order to look after the Tellson's branch there and remove important documents for safekeeping. When Darnay separately travels to Paris and is arrested as a fugitive aristocrat, Lorry remains there and begins working to free him, as well as providing assistance to the Manettes. He gradually softens toward Carton and is deeply touched by the latter's decision to sacrifice his life so Darnay can escape.

Carton's final, unspoken thoughts before his execution mention his belief that "the good old man" Lorry will die peacefully in ten years' time and leave his estate to Darnay, Lucie, and their family.

== Cinematic and theatrical portrayals ==
- In the 1935 Metro-Goldwyn-Mayer film adaptation, Jarvis Lorry is portrayed by Claude Gillingwater.
- In the 2008 Broadway musical adaptation of A Tale of Two Cities, Jarvis Lorry is played by Michael Hayward-Jones.
