= The seamstress (A Tale of Two Cities) =

Fictional Character

- A Tale of Two Cities character
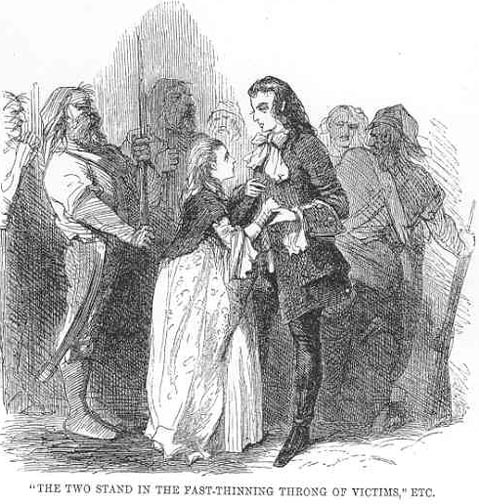
- The seamstress and Carton, illustration by John McLenan (1859)
- Created by: Charles Dickens

In-universe information
- Gender: Female
- Occupation: Seamstress
- Relatives: One surviving cousin

The seamstress is a fictional character in Charles Dickens's 1859 novel A Tale of Two Cities.

== Overview ==
The seamstress is an unnamed twenty-year-old woman featured as a desperately poor peasant accused of plotting against the French Republic by Robespierre's Committee of Public Safety during the Terror of the French Revolution in 1793.

Found guilty of this imaginary crime, she was condemned to death by beheading. She became acquainted with Charles Darnay during their imprisonments in La Force Prison, and was the only person to recognize Sydney Carton as an impostor as the two of them rode to their execution together.

She spends her last moments conversing with Carton noting that he provides strength to her. The Republic executes her as the 22nd of fifty-two to be killed that day. Sydney Carton dies directly after her.

== Character analysis ==
The seamstress is described as "a young woman, with a slight girlish form, a sweet spare face in which there was no vestige of color, and large widely opened patient eyes". She often denotes herself as "poor," "little," "ignorant," and "weak". Although she says she is weak, she maintains a calm temperament through her last moments as Dickens often describes her hands, eyes, and face as "patient".

Her calm disposition only breaks once as she tells Carton of her cousin, five years her junior, who is her only familial relative. She remains calm as she describes that they have been separated by poverty and that her cousin will not know of her fate, but begins to tear up as she wonders if it will be a long wait before she sees her again in heaven.

She is understanding and accepting of the Republic even as she is sentenced to death. She states, "I am not unwilling to die, if the Republic which is to do so much good to us poor, will profit by my death". She only references the Republic once more as she mentions her cousin in that the Republic may extend her cousin's life to old age.

== Relationship with Sydney Carton ==
After she realizes that Carton has sacrificed himself for Darnay, she calls him "brave and generous". They share a brief kiss before she goes to die.

== Literary significance and criticism ==
Doris Y. Kadish describes the seamstress as "a humble heroine of the revolution," while "Lisa Robson (Modern Criticism, pp. 97-101) and other feminist critics draw on late-twentieth century studies of the role of women in the French Revolution to offer new perspectives on...the seamstress..." and Beth Harris writes that "the anonymous seamstress in A Tale of Two Cities, who has 'done nothing,' re-establishes a narrative horizon that charts its length along the great actions of men..."

== Cinematic and theatrical portrayals ==
In the 1911 film version, Norma Talmadge played the seamstress, although in this version Sidney Carton ascends the scaffold before her, and her death is not actually depicted. In the 1935 film version, the seamstress is played by Isabel Jewell.

In the 2008 Broadway adaptation of A Tale of Two Cities, the seamstress was played by MacKenzie Mauzy.
