= A Tale of Two Cities (1935 play) =

A Tale of Two Cities is a 1935 play by Terence Rattigan and John Gielgud, adapting the novel of the same name by Charles Dickens. It was intended to premiere in 1935, but Gielgud (who had also planned to play Sydney Carton) cancelled the production to avoid competing with another actor's adaptation of the same work. It was put on once at a school and adapted for radio in 1950, but its professional stage premiere was from September 25 until October 19, 2013 at the King's Head Theatre.
