= James Wilby =

British actor (born 1958)

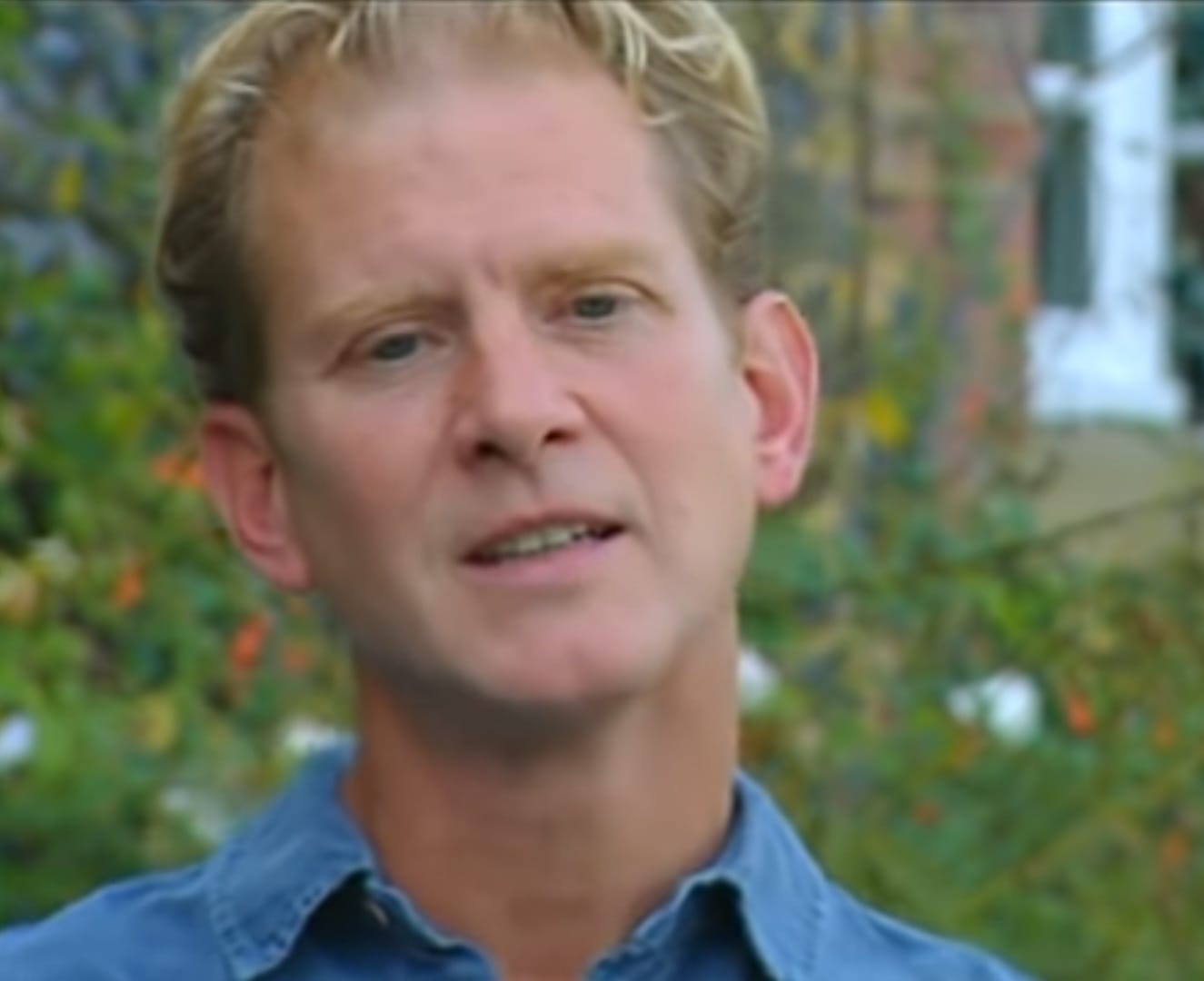
- Wilby in 2004
- Born: James Jonathon Wilby; 20 February 1958 (age 68); Rangoon, Burma
- Education: Grey College, Durham University, Royal Academy of Dramatic Art
- Occupation: Actor
- Years active: 1982–present
- Spouse: Shana Louise
- Children: 4

James Jonathon Wilby (born 20 February 1958) is an English actor. He is best known for his performance in the romantic film Maurice (1987), playing the titular main character, for which he won the Volpi Cup for Best Actor.

== Early life and education ==
Wilby was born in Rangoon, Burma, to a corporate executive father. He was educated at Terrington Hall and Sedbergh School, then studied, for a degree in mathematics, at Grey College, Durham, and at the Royal Academy of Dramatic Art.

== Career ==
Wilby's first appearance on screen was in the Oxford Film Company production Privileged (1982) alongside Hugh Grant. He acted with Grant again in the Merchant Ivory period film Maurice (1987), which brought him to the attention of an international audience and earned Wilby and Grant the Venice Film Festival's Best Actor award. He then starred in A Handful of Dust (1988), for which he won the Bari Film Festival Best Actor award. His further roles included A Tale of Two Cities (1989) for Granada Television, Howards End (1992), Regeneration (1997), Ismail Merchant's Cotton Mary (1999), Gosford Park (2001), and Alain Robbe-Grillet's C'est Gradiva qui vous appelle (2006), co-starring Arielle Dombasle, which premiered at the Venice Film Festival.

On stage, Wilby starred in the 1995 revival of John Osborne's A Patriot for Me by the Royal Shakespeare Company at the Barbican Theatre. He then appeared in a production of Helping Harry at the Jermyn Street Theatre in 2001; and in 2004 as the title character in a run of Don Juan at the Lyric Theatre. He has also starred in On Emotion (2008) at the Soho Theatre; The Consultant (2011) by Neil Fleming and the Hydrocracker Theatre Company at Theatre503 in London; and in tours of Terence Rattigan's Less Than Kind (2012) and Patrick Hamilton's Gaslight (2019).

== Personal life ==
Wilby is married to Shana Louise and has four children.

From 1994 to 2015, Wilby owned The Laines, an 18th-century country house in Plumpton, East Sussex, near Lewes. It was the childhood home of Queen Camilla.

== Filmography ==
=== Film ===
Year	Film	Role	Notes
1982	Privileged	Jamie	
1985	Dreamchild	Baker	
1985	A Room with a View	Party Guest	Uncredited
1987	Maurice	Maurice Hall	
1988	A Handful of Dust	Tony Last	
1988	A Summer Story	Mr. Ashton	
1989	Conspiracy	Stringer	
1991	The Siege of Venice	Milord Runbiff	
1991	Adam Bede	Arthur Donnithorne	
1992	Howards End	Charles Wilcox	
1992	Immaculate Conception	Alistair	
1994	La partie d'échecs	Lord Staunton	
1997	Regeneration	2nd Lt. Siegfried Sassoon	
1998	An Ideal Husband	Sir Robert Chiltern	
1999	Tom's Midnight Garden	Uncle Alan Kitson	
1999	Cotton Mary	John MacIntosh	
2001	Jump Tomorrow	Nathan	
2001	Gosford Park	Freddie Nesbitt	
2004	De-Lovely	Edward Thomas	
2006	Gradiva (C'est Gradiva qui vous appelle)	John Locke	
2008	Lady Godiva	Leofric	
2009	Shadows in the Sun	Robert	
2011	We Need to Talk About Keiran	Professor Hugh Merrill	
2016	ChickLit	Geoffrey	
2016	The Swing of It	Jim	Short film
2017	The Sense of an Ending	David Ford	
2019	Salt	Conrad	Short film
2020	The Duke	Judge Aarvold	
2022	Masquerade	Thomas	French film
2024	Vindication Swim	Mr. Havers	

=== Television ===
Year	Film	Role	Notes
1984	The Adventures of Sherlock Holmes	Young Barclay	Episode: "The Crooked Man"
1984	The Bill	Higgins	Episode: "A Friend in Need"
1985	Dutch Girls	Dundine	TV movie
1988	The Storyteller	Prince	Episode: "Sapsorrow"
1989	A Tale of Two Cities	Sydney Carton	TV mini-series
1989	Mother Love	Christopher "Kit" Vesey	TV mini-series
1991	Screen One	Michael Evans	Episode: "Tell Me That You Love Me"
1993	You, Me and It	Charles Henderson	TV mini-series, 3 episodes
1993	Lady Chatterley	Sir Clifford Chatterley	4 episodes
1994	Crocodile Shoes	Ade Lynn	TV mini-series, 6 episodes
1996	The Treasure Seekers	Henry Carlisle	TV movie
1996	Witness Against Hitler	Helmuth James von Moltke	TV movie
1996	Tales from the Crypt	Nick Marvin	Episode: "Horrors in the Night"
1997	The Woman in White	Sir Percival Glyde	TV movie
1997	Original Sin	Gerard Etienne	TV series
1999	The Dark Room	Dr. Alan Protheroe	TV movie
2000	Trial & Retribution	James McCready	2 episodes
2001	Adrian Mole: The Cappuccino Years	Zippo Montefiore	1 episode
2002	Bertie and Elizabeth	King George VI	TV film
2002	Westlife: Unbreakable – The Greatest Hits, Volume I	High class customer ("Uptown Girl")	video
2002	George Eliot: A Scandalous Life	George Spencer	TV film
2003	Murder in Mind	Daniel Morton/Sir Richard Morton	Episode: "Echoes"
2003	Sparkling Cyanide	Stephen Farraday	TV movie
2004	Island at War	Sen. James Dorr	TV mini-series, 3 episodes
2004	Silent Witness	Matt Gibb	TV series, 2 episodes: "Nowhere Fast"
2004	Foyle's War	Major Cornwall	Episode: "They Fought in the Fields"
2005	Jericho	Alan Mills	TV series (1 episode: "The Hollow Men")
2006	Surviving Disaster	David Sheahan	Episode: "Fastnet Yacht Race"
2006	Agatha Christie's Marple: The Sittaford Mystery	Stanley Kirkwood	TV movie
2006	Ancient Rome: The Rise and Fall of an Empire	Ofonius Tigellinus	Episode: "Nero"
2007	Lewis	Hugh Mallory	Episode: "Expiation"
2007	The Last Days of the Raj	Lord Mountbatten	TV movie
2007	Clapham Junction	Julian Rowan	TV movie
2007	Little Devil	Adrian Bishop	TV mini-series, Episode: "Episode #1.3"
2007	Impact Earth	Josh Hayden	TV movie
2008	A Risk Worth Taking	Patrick Trenchard	TV film
2008	Agatha Christie's Poirot	Andrew Restarick	Episode: "Third Girl"
2010	Midsomer Murders	Edward Milton	Episode: "The Made-to-Measure Murders"
2011	Secret Diary of a Call Girl	Henry	Episode: "Episode #4.4"
2012	Titanic	J. Bruce Ismay	TV series, 4 episodes
2012	The Best Possible Taste	Wilfred De'Ath	BBC TV movie
2013	The Great Train Robbery	John Wheater	TV mini-series, Episode: A Copper's Tale
2014	Law & Order: UK	Charles Hutton	Episode: Bad Romance
2014	Endeavour	ACC Clive Deare	Episode: Neverland
2015	Death in Paradise	Elias Thomson	Episode: Stab in the Dark
2015	Strike Back	Charles Ridley	TV series, 5 episodes
2016–2017	Casualty	Archie Grayling	6 episodes
2016	Churchill's Secret	Brendan Bracken	TV movie
2017–2018	Poldark	Lord Falmouth	10 episodes
2018	Father Brown	Sefton Scott	Episode: "The Cat of Mastigatus"
2024	The Famous Five	Mr Vincent	Episode: "Mystery at the Prospect Hotel"
2025	I, Jack Wright	Max Preston	TV series, 5 episodes
2025	The Marlow Murder Club	Sir Peter Bailey	TV series

== See also ==
- List of British actors
- List of Durham University people
- List of RADA alumni
