= John Barsad =

Character in Charles Dickens' novel A Tale of Two Cities

John Barsad is a character in Charles Dickens' 1859 novel, A Tale of Two Cities.

== Overview ==
Barsad is a turncoat, English con-man, and spy, and partner of Roger Cly. In the pay of the Marquis St. Evremonde, he initially frames the Marquis' nephew, Charles Darnay by planting evidence on him on a voyage across the English Channel.

Roger Cly, also revealed to be a spy, fakes his death and flees England, but Jerry Cruncher discovers the fraud when he attempts to 'resurrect' Cly's body for the purpose of selling the body to doctors. Cruncher initially blames his wife's praying and thinks Roger Cly has been removed through spiritual means.

Carton discovers Barsad in Paris much later and finds him to be Miss Pross' long-lost brother Solomon. He enlists Barsad's aid, by blackmailing him, to get into the prison to rescue Charles Darnay by changing places with him, Carton and Darnay being almost identical in appearance. Barsad then brings Darnay out of the prison and back to his family. Carton is eventually executed by guillotine in Darnay's place.

Barsad is genuinely dumbfounded by Carton's sacrifice - though not enough to change his own ways. In the final prophetic chapter of the book, Barsad, along with many others, is revealed to die by the guillotine at some time in the future.

== Analysis ==
Barsad is described in Book 2, Chapter 3 of A Tale of Two Cities as "one of the greatest scoundrels upon the earth since accursed Judas-which he certainly did look rather like." This is a direct reference to Judas Iscariot, the man who betrayed Jesus Christ in the Bible, and is explaining that Barsad is a very untrustworthy man.

== Cinematic and theatrical portrayals ==
- Walter Catlett played John Barsad in the 1935 David O. Selznick production of A Tale of Two Cities.
- Donald Pleasence played him in the 1958 Betty Box production of A Tale of Two Cities.
- Barsad was played by David Suchet in the 1980 film A Tale of Two Cities.
- In the 2008 Broadway musical adaptation of A Tale of Two Cities, John Barsad was played by Nick Wyman.
- In the 2012 film The Dark Knight Rises, actor Josh Stewart played Bane's right-hand man, Barsad, who is named after John Barsad.
