= Ernest Defarge =

Fictional character

Ernest Defarge is a fictional character in Charles Dickens' 1859 novel, A Tale of Two Cities.

== Overview ==
Defarge is the owner of a wine shop in the slum of Saint Antoine in Paris. He and his wife Madame Therese Defarge are passionate advocates for revolution and regularly dispense and gather information from inside the wine shop. When the story starts, Defarge is harboring Dr. Alexandre Manette, his old employer, who has just been released from eighteen years of unjust and secret imprisonment in the Bastille. Defarge is loyal to Dr. Manette and truly cares for him, but he doesn’t shrink from a little exploitation by showing Manette to other patriots as an inspiration for the revolt he hopes to incite. Defarge tells Manette’s story to a group of men in the hopes that they will spread the word of abuses perpetrated by the aristocracy - specifically, two brothers named St. Evrèmonde.

Defarge is the leader of his community and will be pivotal in leading the people on the Storming of the Bastille. He discovers a paper in Dr. Manette’s old cell in the Bastille which documents why Manette was imprisoned and by whom. These papers prove nearly fatal to the novel's protagonist, Charles Darnay, in recounting a series of injustices and murders by his father and uncle. Worse still, these infamies were committed against the family of Madame Defarge, Ernest's ruthless wife, who convinces him to denounce Darnay to the guillotine. Generally good-natured and decent, Defarge is torn by loyalty to his wife and loyalty to Dr. Manette; he does nothing to stop Manette's family from escaping France, despite Madame Defarge's urging. Darnay is not executed however; he is saved by Carton. Carton prophesies that Ernest Defarge and the Vengeance will be consumed by the Revolution's guillotine.

== Portrayals in film and theater ==
In the 1935 Metro-Goldwyn-Mayer film adaptation, Ernest Defarge is portrayed by Mitchell Lewis.

In the 2008 Broadway adaptation of 'A Tale of Two Cities,' Ernest Defarge is played by Kevin Earley.
