= Stryver =

- A Tale of Two Cities character
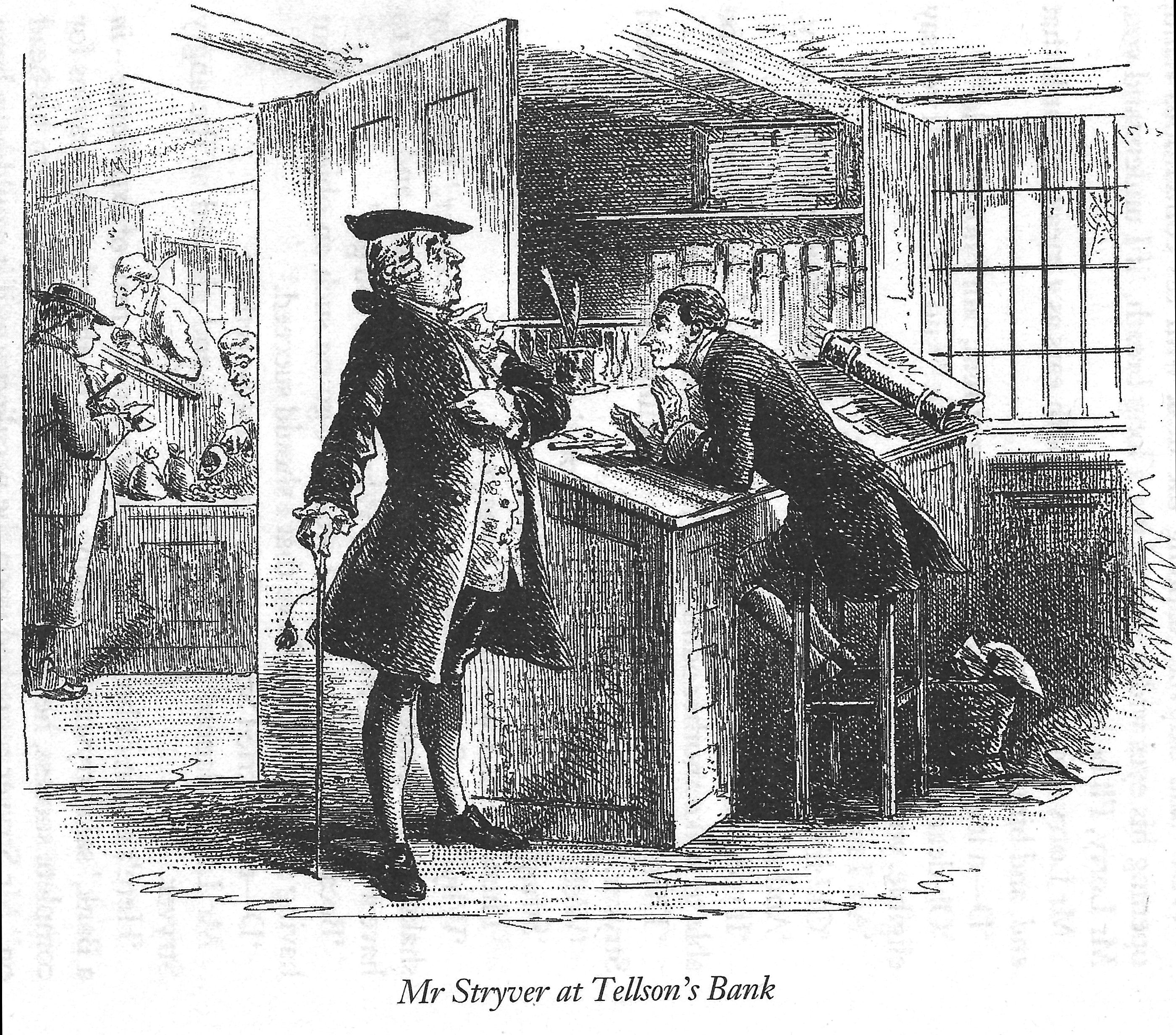
- Mr Stryver at Tellson's Bank by Phiz, 1859
- Created by: Charles Dickens

In-universe information
- Gender: Male
- Occupation: Lawyer
- Nationality: English

C.J. Stryver is a character in Charles Dickens's 1859 novel A Tale of Two Cities and in the television and film adaptations of the story. He is a barrister in London, with the character Sydney Carton working under him.

== Development ==
The real-life inspiration for the character is likely the 19th century British barrister, Edwin James.

== Depiction in the novel ==
He first appears in the novel as counsel for the defense of Charles Darnay. He then reappears in Sydney Carton's introductory chapter as his friend, drinking companion, and partner in law; however, while he cuts a very impressive figure in court, it is apparent that Carton seems to have all the true legal knowledge and ability. While he and Sydney Carton were students at the same university of law, it appears that Stryver may have graduated due to Carton's doing all his scholastic work for him. Based on repeated descriptions of him as a "shoulderer" and a "thruster" and his own name, it can be implied that Stryver is a very ambitious man determined to push himself to the top of his profession and in society. He later tells Sydney that he intends to marry Lucie Manette; however, after consulting Jarvis Lorry he decides against it and even talks himself into such a state that he congratulates himself upon his decision. He is also a man of strong prejudices; at Tellson's bank in Chapter 24 when Charles Darnay says that he knows the new Marquis St. Evremonde, Stryver says "I am sorry a man who instructs youth knows him," not knowing that the Marquis St. Evremonde is Charles himself.

== Depiction on stage ==
Wayne Schroder played "C. J. Stryver" in "the Broadway-aimed musical by Jill Santoriello."

== Reception and analysis ==
Stryver has been described as " a caricature of the conquering bourgeoise", and a "minor character with a comic function".
