= Retelling =

Process of telling a story again, often tweaking or recontextualising it

Retelling, in media studies and literary studies, is the production of a derivative work that is substantially based on an earlier work but that presents the story differently.

== In literature ==
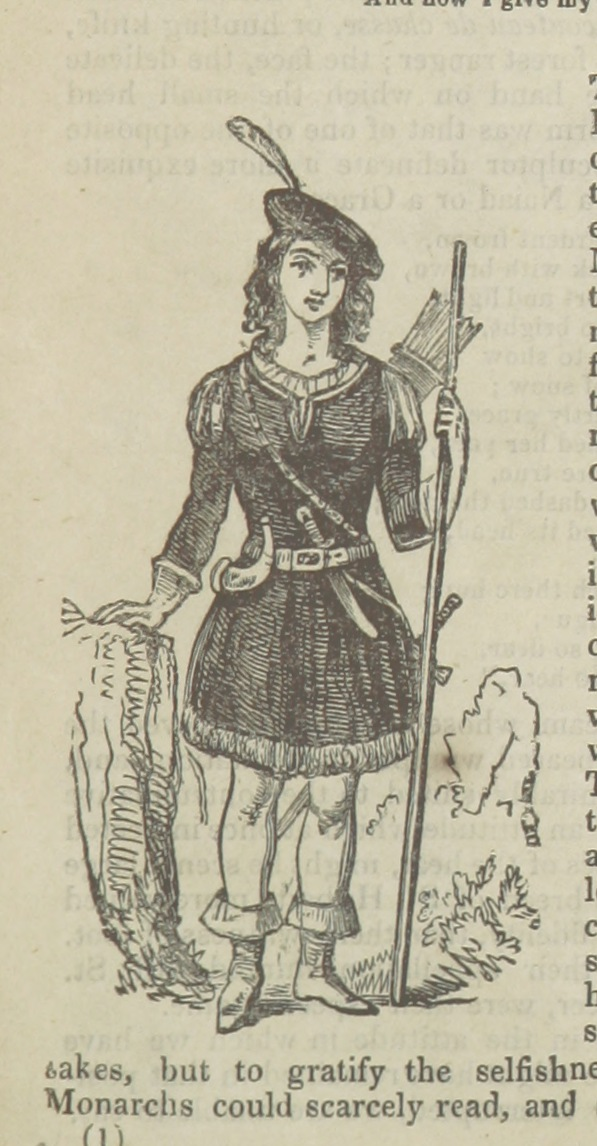
Maid Marian – a female character that did not exist in early versions of the Robin Hood story but has grown increasingly prominent in retold variants

Retelling, in literature, refashions a story in a way that makes it similar but not identical with its predecessor.

Some retellings involve only minor changes. Others are more substantial: a retold story can change genre, style, narrative point of view, or medium. Thus, for example, a written story can be retold through illustrations or from an antagonist's or side character's point of view. Retold stories are often shaped by metanarrative (major aspects of culture) relevant to the culture and time of the retelling.

Some retellings have simplified the story's material. Others have altered it to make it more appealing and relevant to a changing audience (for example, by focusing on previously nonexistent or marginal female characters that reflect a feminist perspective, as in Disney retellings such as Maleficent). Some retold stories have been parodies of the original material.

A well retold story can hold conviction for readers. A number of stories have been substantially reshaped through retellings that have led to major and enduring changes. For example, in recent decades the tale of Robin Hood has given increased importance to the character Maid Marian, who did not appear at all in early versions; and, in a similar time frame, the story of Aladdin has changed to include the motif of three wishes.

The concept of the retelling of stories has been discussed by literary scholars since as early as the 10th century.

Retelling is common with works that are seen as "traditional" or "classic" – that is, with stories of major cultural importance such as myths and legends (e.g., Greek myths, Sanskrit epics, Arthurian legends) – with modern classics (such as works by Shakespeare), and with religious texts such as the Bible. It is also common with children's literature, fairy tales, and folklore stories. Fan fiction is often based on the retelling of stories.

Retelling is also a tool used to transform children's literature into fantasy literature, removing fairy tale elements but leaving magic and other supernatural aspects. Many works of urban fantasy are retellings of classic myths, legends, or fairy tales in a modern setting.

=== Examples ===
Examples of retellings include:

- The Firebrand – a 1987 novel by Marion Zimmer Bradley retelling the Greek myth of Cassandra and the Trojan War
- Possession: A Romance – a 1990 novel by A. S. Byatt retelling the tales of Snow White and Melusine
- Howl's Moving Castle – a 1986 fantasy book by Diana Wynne Jones retelling multiple folklore stories
- The Amazing Maurice and His Educated Rodents – a 2001 children's novel by Terry Pratchett retelling the tale of Pied Piper of Hamelin

== Similar concepts ==
The concept of literary retelling is similar to that of remaking (or reimagining, or rebooting) in the film, movie, and video-game industries. It has been suggested that the concept of remaking focuses on technological advances in the latter industries, while retelling refers to culturally-driven changes in plot. The retelling of stories can also involve the simpler concept of abridgement, and in this context is used in education studies.

== See also ==
- Greek mythology retelling
- Parallel novel
- Expurgation
- Remix
