= Fred Barnard =

British illustrator (1846–1896)

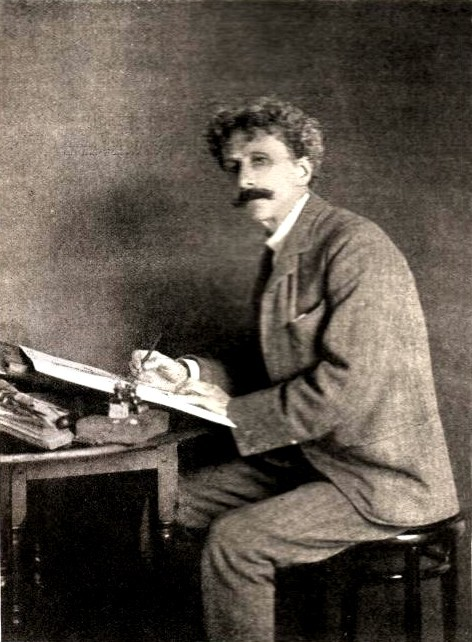
- Barnard in 1892
- Born: 16 May 1846; London, England
- Died: 28 September 1896 (aged 50); Wimbledon, England
- Education: Léon Bonnat
- Known for: Illustrator
- Spouse: Alice Faraday

Frederick Barnard (16 May 1846 – 28 September 1896) was an English illustrator, caricaturist and genre painter. He is noted for his work on the novels of Charles Dickens published between 1871 and 1879 by Chapman and Hall.

== Life and work ==
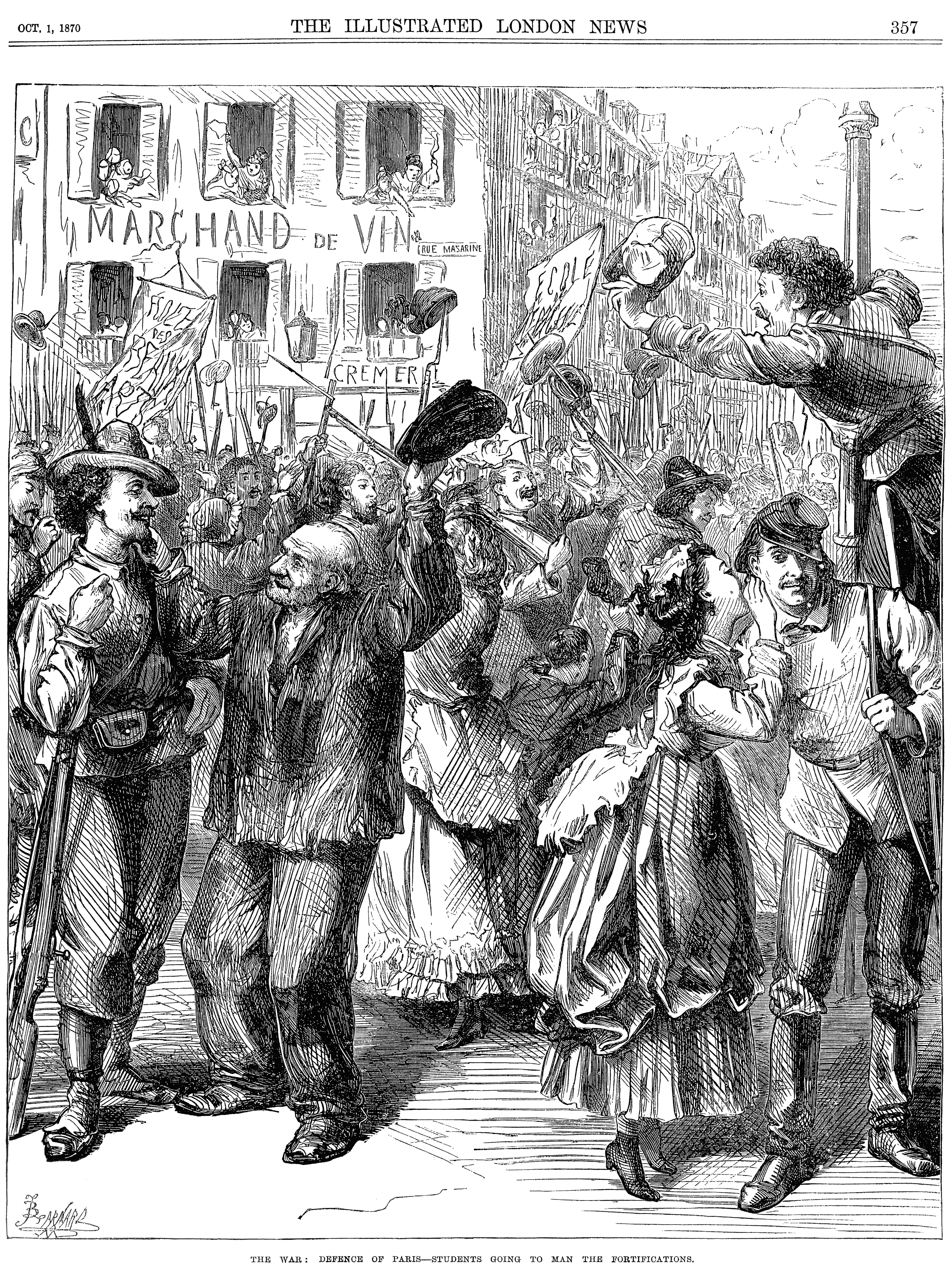
One of Barnard's illustrations of the Franco-Prussian War for The Illustrated London News

Barnard was born in the Christchurch district in London, one of seven children of Caroline née Chater (1797–1876) and Edward Barnard (1796–1867), a silversmith. He studied art under Léon Bonnat in Paris, and worked in London and at Cullercoats on the Northumberland coast. His work was exhibited at the Royal Academy of Art. He also worked as an illustrator for Punch, The Illustrated London News, and Harper's Weekly.

In 1870 Barnard married Alice Faraday, a niece of Michael Faraday. In the 1880s, Barnard and his wife joined a colony of artists at Broadway in the Cotswolds.

In 1871 Barnard was commissioned by Chapman and Hall to illustrate nine volumes of the Household Edition of Dickens' work. It included Bleak House, A Tale of Two Cities, Sketches by Boz, Nicholas Nickleby, Barnaby Rudge, Dombey and Son and Martin Chuzzlewit. He followed in the footsteps of the respected illustrator Hablot Knight Browne who had worked with Dickens himself. Barnard created some 450 illustrations over an eight-year period, and became known as "the Charles Dickens among black-and-white artists."

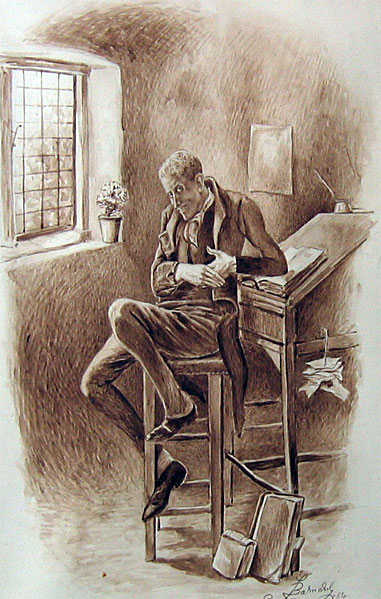
Uriah Heep, by Fred Barnard

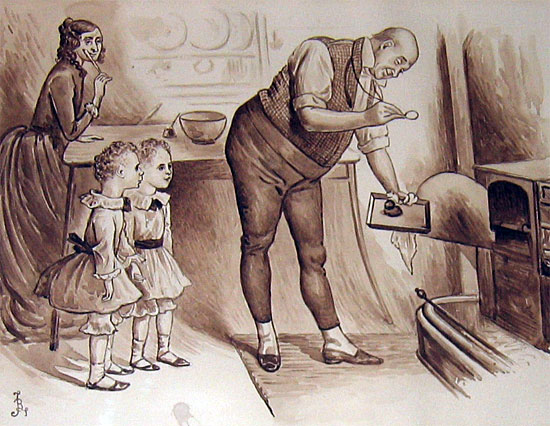
Mr and Mrs Micawber and the twins, by Fred Barnard

Barnard concentrated on illustrating scenes other than those that Browne and Dickens had chosen to portray. Whereas Browne was inclined to create dramatic group scenes for his prints, Barnard was more interested in showing the relationships between pairs of characters. At the same time, Barnard also had to seamlessly blend the characters as visualised by Browne with his own style, trying not to deviate too much from their established appearance.

After the death of his son Geoffrey in 1891, Barnard went into a decline. His relationship with Alice suffered, and he fell into a deep depression, which he tried to escape by taking laudanum. On 27 September 1896 Barnard died at his home, Aber-Maw on Merton Hall Road in Wimbledon after his bedclothes caught fire from the pipe he was smoking while under the influence of a drug, probably laudanum. His cause of death was suffocation, although his body was also badly charred. He was buried in the churchyard of St Mary's church in Wimbledon.

== Family ==
Barnard was married to Alice Faraday (1847–1924) on the Isle of Wight on 11 August 1870. They had three children: Geoffrey (1872–1891), Marion Alice or "Polly" (1874–1946), and Dorothy, or "Dolly" (1878–1949). Geoffrey was an artist himself, who worked alongside his father until his death on 18 December 1891 in Evesham from congenital heart disease.

The painter Elinor M. Barnard (1872–1942) was Barnard's niece.

John Singer Sargent had become very close to the Barnard family by the time of Frederick's death. Barnard's daughters Dorothy and Polly served as the models for Sargent's painting Carnation, Lily, Lily, Rose. He would, in later years, take the Barnard girls along on his painting trips to southern Europe. In Sargent's will, drawn up in 1918, he left £5000 to Alice Barnard.

== Gallery ==
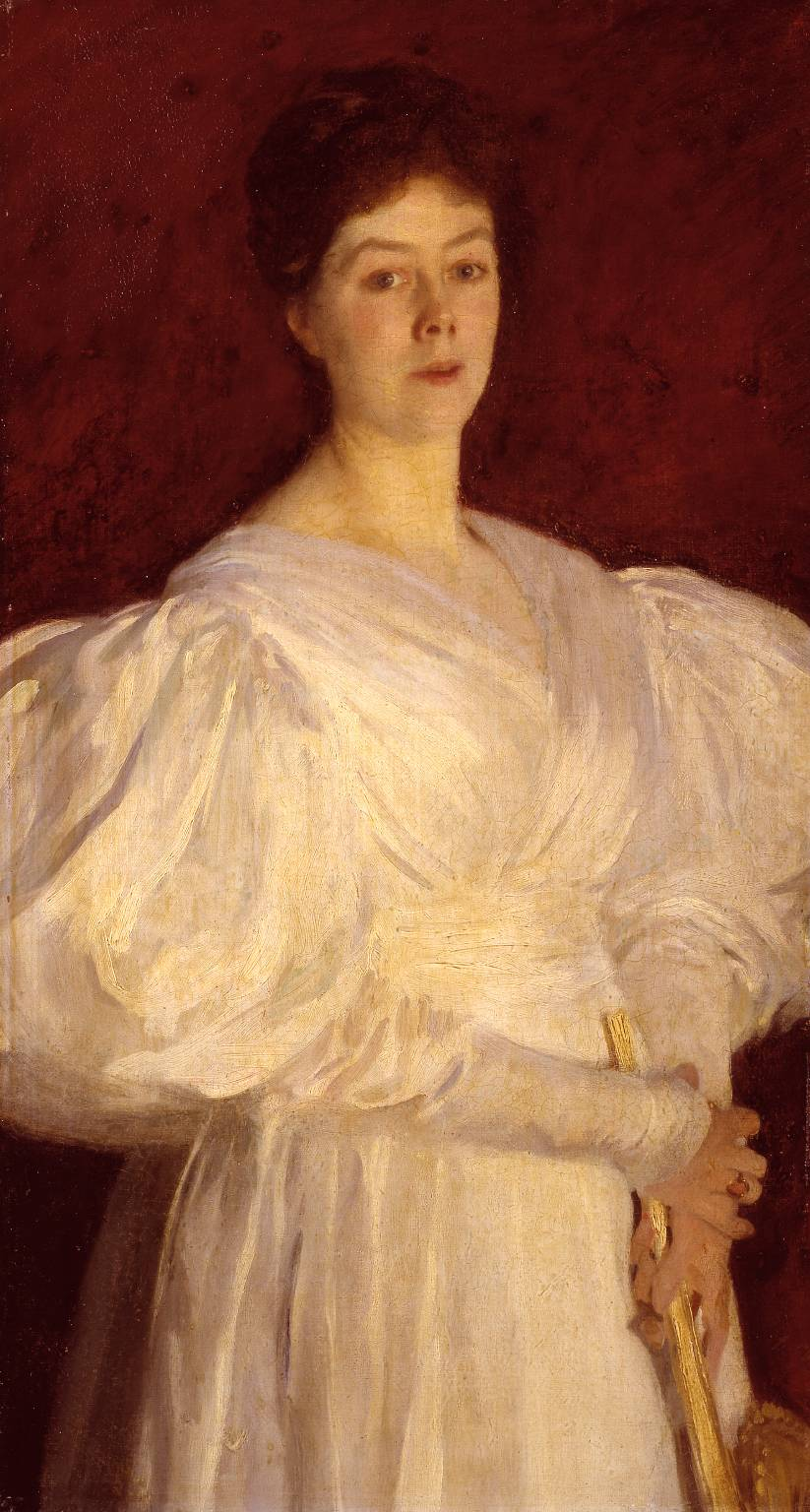
Alice Faraday, wife of Fred Barnard, by John Singer Sargent

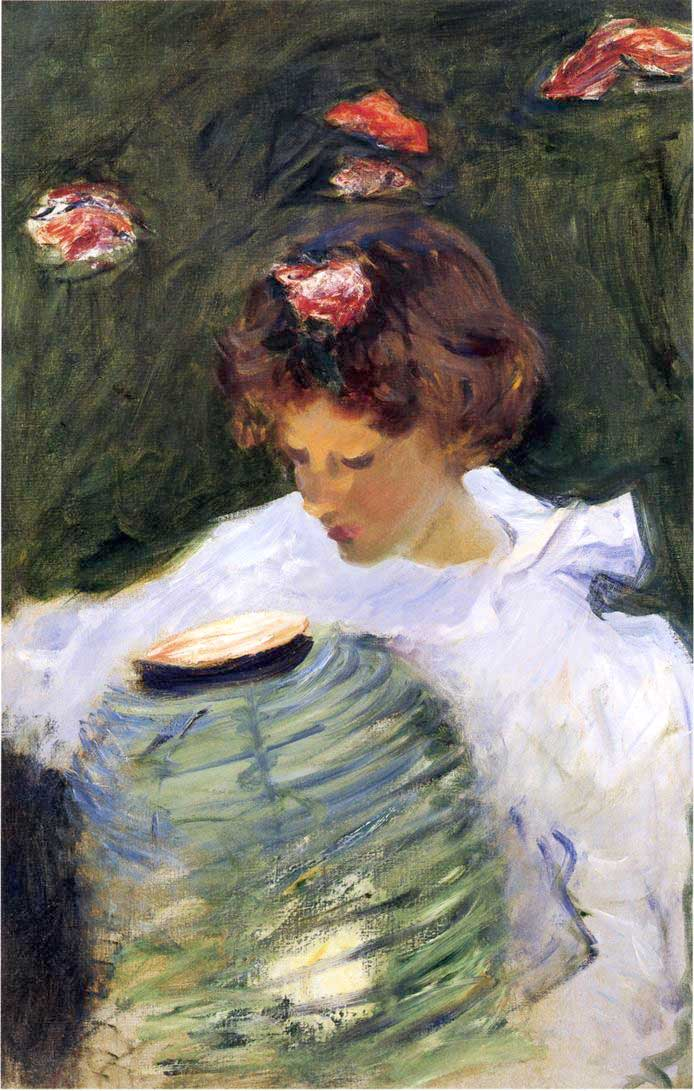
Dorothy Barnard, John Singer Sargent, 1885

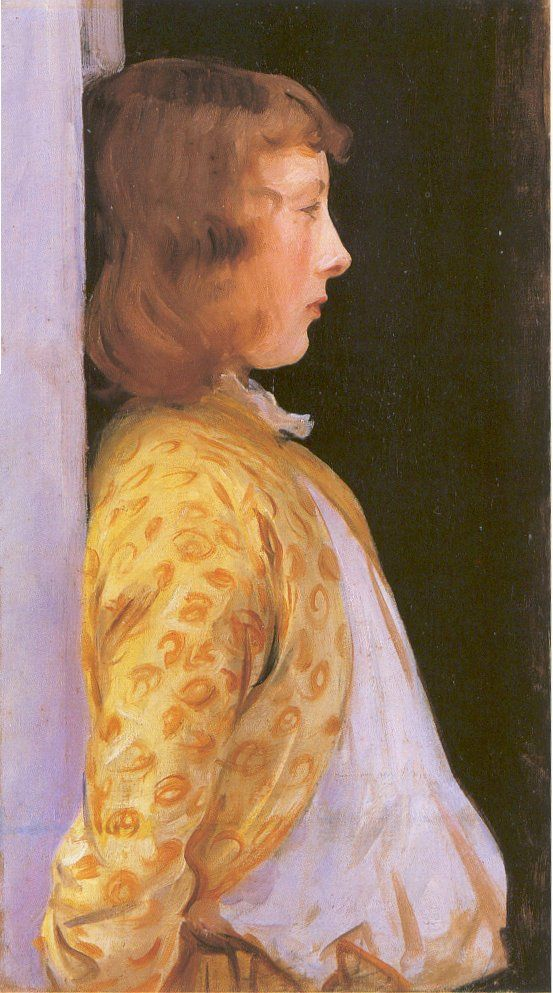
Dorothy Barnard, John Singer Sargent, 1889

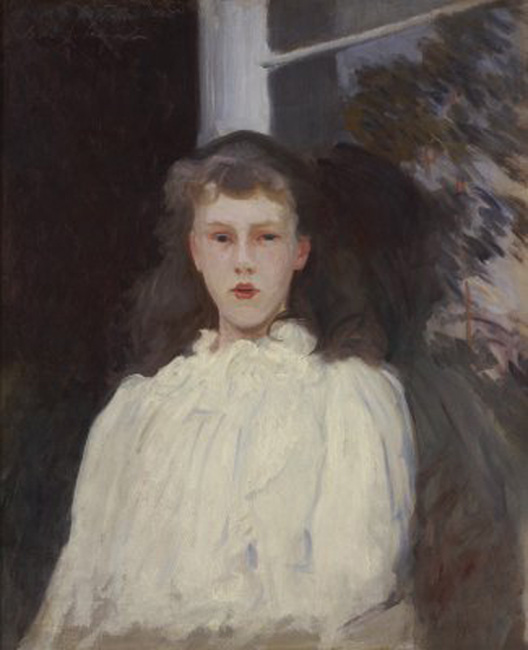
Polly Barnard, Girl in White Muslin, John Singer Sargent, 1889

== Bibliography ==
- Hammerton, J. A. The Dickens Picture-Book. London: Educational Book Co., 1910.
- Kitton, Frederic G. Dickens and His Illustrators. 1899. Rpt. Honolulu: U. Press of the Pacific, 2004.
- Scully, Richard. Eminent Victorian Cartoonists, Volume II: The Rivals of Mr Punch. London: Political Cartoon Society, 2018.
- The Pilgrim's Progress, John Bunyan, 1893, John C. Winston & Co., over 100 illustrations by Fred Barnard
