= Lucie Manette =

- A Tale of Two Cities character
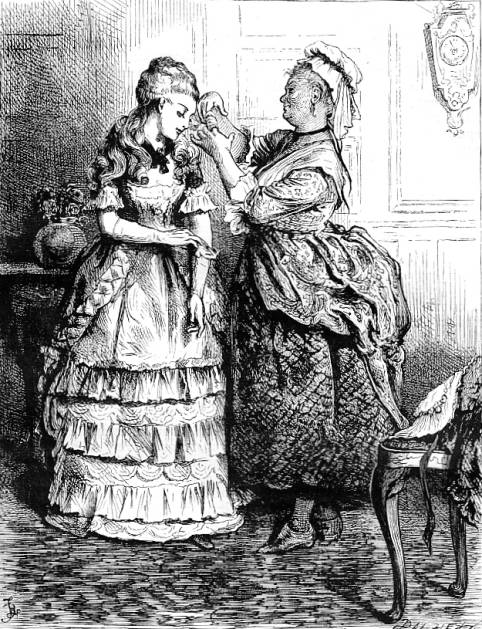
- Lucie Manette and Miss Pross, by Fred Barnard
- Created by: Charles Dickens

In-universe information
- Gender: Female
- Family: Alexandre Manette (Father)
- Spouse: Charles Darnay
- Nationality: French

Lucie Manette is a character in Charles Dickens' 1859 novel A Tale of Two Cities.

== Overview ==
Lucie is the daughter of Dr. Alexandre Manette. She is wise beyond her years, unfailingly kind, and loving. Her love and protection of her father is what attracts Charles Darnay to her.

She meets Darnay, the young Frenchman, on the voyage home with her father. When Darnay is arrested as a spy due to evidence planted on him by John Barsad on the orders of his uncle, the Marquis St. Evremonde, Lucie and her father attend Darnay's trial out of concern.

It is there that she meets Sydney Carton, the drunken lawyer who falls in love with her. She reaches out to Carton out of concern for his well being, but is being actively courted by Darnay and accepts the latter's proposal.

When Lucie's daughter is about six years old, Darnay returns to France. Lucie, Dr. Manette, their daughter, Little Lucie, and Miss Pross go after him after receiving notice of his imprisonment in La Force. Lucie relies on her father to rescue Darnay, which he does, but then Darnay is again accused. During his imprisonment, Lucie remains loyal and faithful to Darnay.

Lucie and her daughter successfully escape from the clutches of Madame Defarge and reunite with Darnay safely, due to Carton's sacrifice in place of Darnay's.

Dickens' portrayal of Lucie is often criticized for not having a developed personality. Instead, Lucie is only significant because of her effects on the other characters.

== Portrayals ==
=== Cinematic and theatrical portrayals ===
On film and television, Lucie has been portrayed by:

- Elizabeth Allan (film, 1935)
- Wendy Hutchinson (TV, 1957)
- Dorothy Tutin (film, 1958)
- Kika Markham (TV, 1965)
- Sally Osborne (TV, 1980)
- Alice Krige (TV, 1980)
- Serena Gordon (TV, 1989)
- Brandi Burkhardt (Broadway, 2008)
- Mirren Mack (TV, 2026)

=== Radio portrayals ===
On radio, Lucie has been portrayed by:

- Charlotte Attenborough (BBC Radio 4, 1989)
- Lydia Wilson (BBC Radio 4, 2011)
