= Charles Darnay =

Fictional character created by Charles Dickens

- A Tale of Two Cities character
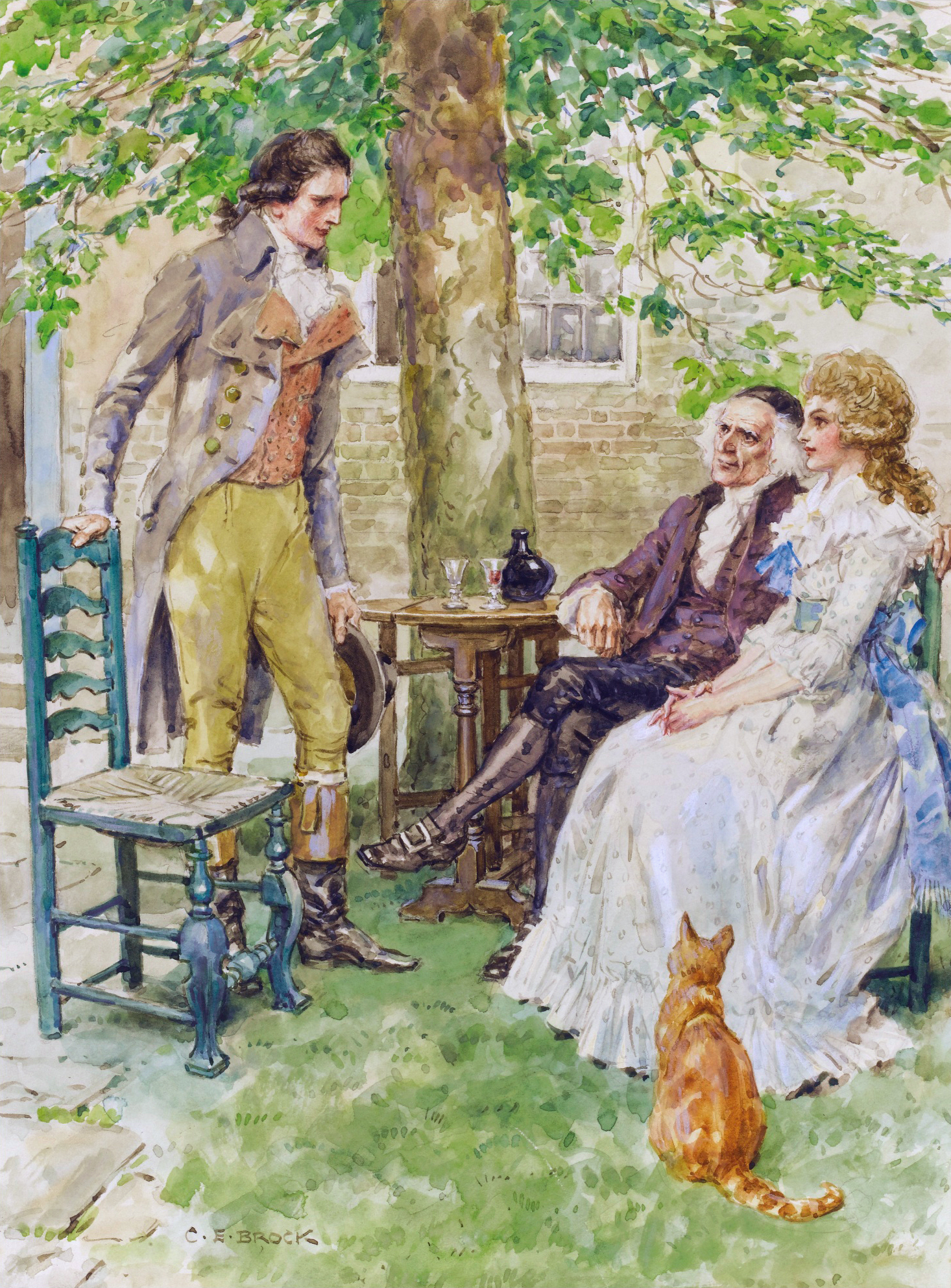
- Dr Manette and Lucie with Charles Darnay, by Charles Edmund Brock
- Created by: Charles Dickens

In-universe information
- Gender: Male
- Occupation: A member of the French ruling class
- Spouse: Lucie Manette
- Nationality: French

Charles Darnay, Charles D'Aulnais or Charles St. Evrémonde is a fictional character in the 1859 novel A Tale of Two Cities by Charles Dickens.

== Overview ==
Darnay is a wealthy gentleman who spends time in both France and England during the time of the story. However, he resents how the lower classes are exploited and kept in extreme poverty by the upper class. Darnay specifically resents the views of his uncle, Marquis St. Evrémonde, who has no respect for people in poverty. He abandons his own family name in favor of his mother's, D'Aulnais, which he later alters to "Darnay". He relocates to London, finding work as a tutor of French language and literature.

Darnay is put on trial for treason against the Kingdom of Great Britain, but the key eyewitness testimony against him is undermined when his defense counsel directs attention to Sydney Carton, a barrister who has been assisting in the case. The two men bear a strong resemblance to one another, and Darnay is acquitted as a result. Later, Darnay succeeds his uncle as Marquis when the latter is stabbed to death in his sleep by a French revolutionary. Both Darnay and Carton express their love for Lucie Manette, but Darnay courts and marries her.

As the French Revolution begins, Darnay is arrested in France and brought before a tribunal, where the crimes of his uncle and father are brought to light. He is sentenced to death by guillotine, and bravely accepts his fate. However, Carton then takes his place (rendering Darnay unconscious so that he cannot refuse his help) so that he and his family can escape.

Later, Lucie and Charles have a son whom they call Sydney in honor of their friend.

== Cinematic and theatrical portrayals ==
In the 1935 Metro-Goldwyn-Mayer film adaptation, Charles Darnay is portrayed by Donald Woods.

In the 1958 The Rank Organisation film adaptation, Charles Darnay is portrayed by Paul Guers.

In the 1989 Masterpiece Theatre television adaptation, Charles Darnay is played by Xavier Deluc.

In the 2008 Broadway musical/play adaptation of A Tale of Two Cities, Charles Darnay is played by Aaron Lazar.
