= Airthrey =

Airthrey may refer to:

- A house at Wallace High School, Stirling
- Airthrey Castle, on the grounds of the University of Stirling
