= Monsoon (2019 film) =

- Official poster
- Directed by: Hong Khaou
- Written by: Hong Khaou
- Produced by: Tracy O'Riordan
- Starring: Henry Golding; Parker Sawyers; David Tran; Molly Harris; Lâm Vissay
- Cinematography: Benjamin Kračun
- Edited by: Mark Towns
- Music by: John Cummings
- Production companies: BBC Films; British Film Institute; Moonspun Films; Sharphouse
- Distributed by: Peccadillo Pictures
- Release dates: 29 June 2019 (KVIFF); 25 September 2020 (United Kingdom)
- Running time: 100 minutes
- Country: United Kingdom
- Languages: English; Vietnamese
- Box office: $190,152

Monsoon is a 2019 British drama film, written and directed by Hong Khaou and produced by Tracy O'Riordan. It stars Henry Golding, Parker Sawyers, David Tran and Molly Harris.

Monsoon had its world premiere at the Karlovy Vary International Film Festival on 29 June 2019. It was released in the United Kingdom on 25 September 2020, by Peccadillo Pictures.

== Synopsis ==
Kit (Henry Golding), a young British Vietnamese man, returns to his birth country for the first time in over 30 years. He was just six years old when he and his family escaped Saigon as 'boat refugees' after the Vietnam War. No longer familiar with this country and unable to speak his native language, Kit embarks on a personal journey from Saigon to Hanoi in search of a place to scatter his parents’ ashes. Along the way he reconnects with his cousin and childhood friend Lee (David Tran) and falls for Lewis (Parker Sawyers), an American whose father had fought in the war.

During his travels, Kit finally starts to connect to the memories of his parents and his own roots.

== Cast ==
- Henry Golding as Kit
- Parker Sawyers as Lewis
- David Tran as Lee
- Molly Harris as Linh
- Lâm Vissay as Henry

== Production ==
Monsoon was awarded the Sundance Institute/ Mahindra Global Filmmaking Award in 2014. The feature was also among the BFI's top ten Film Fund recipients, receiving £800,000.

In March 2018, it was announced Henry Golding had joined the cast of the film, with Hong Khaou directing from a screenplay he wrote. Tracy O'Riordan would serve as a producer on the film, with BBC Films and British Film Institute producing.

When director Hong Khaou's Lilting played at Sundance Film Festival, the Sundance Screenwriter's Lab suggested Khaou pitch them an idea for his next project. In the four years that followed, with the support of the BFI and BBC Films, the film underwent "various incarnations" according to Khaou. As an example, the character of Lewis, an African American in the finished film, started out as Hank, a white American. Khaou stated that the change was made because executives and financiers believed that "the Hank character’s voice – the dominant white American, in terms of the subtext of the war – had been heard before."

== Release ==
Monsoon had its world premiere at the 54th Karlovy Vary International Film Festival in competition on 29 June 2019. In April 2020, Strand Releasing acquired U.S. distribution rights to the film. It was released in the United Kingdom on 25 September 2020, and in the United States on 13 November 2020.

== Critical reception ==
Monsoon has received very positive reviews from critics out of Karlovy Vary International Film Festival. Review aggregator Rotten Tomatoes reports that 87% of 61 film critics have given the film a positive review, with a rating average of 7.1/10. The site's critical consensus reads, "Monsoon sees writer-director Hong Khaou offering a thoughtful look at the emigrant experience, brought beautifully to life by Henry Golding's stellar performance."

Demetrios Matheou, in his review for Screen Daily, said that "it’s a touching, thoughtful and gorgeously shot piece of work, which both examines its protagonist’s experience of displacement and tenderly evokes a country moving energetically forwards while some are still tied painfully to the past." Jessica Kiang, in her review for Variety, called it "A graceful and truthfully irresolute investigation into the strange, often poignantly unreciprocated relationship that many first- and second-generation emigrants have with the far-off foreign country of the past". Giving the film a 'B−' score, Gregory Ellwood writing for The Playlist said "for a naturalistically told story about a man finding his place in the world, slightly more emotion wouldn’t have necessarily been a bad thing". Boyd van Hoeij of The Hollywood Reporter praised the film, calling it "an intimate drama of surprising depth". At Film London's new-look London Screenings, which took place at Picturehouse Central in London's West End from June 24–27, Monsoon was described by one distributor in London as “absolutely charming”.

Monsoon was nominated for the 2021 GLAAD Media Award for Outstanding Film (Limited Release).
