= Wallace High School =

Wallace is a name for several high schools in the English-speaking world, including:

- Lew Wallace High School, Gary, Indiana
- Wallace High School (Idaho), Wallace, Idaho
- Wallace High School (Nebraska), Wallace, Nebraska
- Wallace High School, Lisburn, Northern Ireland
- Wallace High School, Stirling
