= Naomi Yang =

Naomi Yang may refer to:

- Naomi Yang (musician)
- Naomi Yang (actress)
