= A Tale of Two Cities (2026 TV series) =

2026 historical drama television series

- Genre: Historical drama
- Created by: Daniel West
- Based on: A Tale of Two Cities by Charles Dickens
- Written by: Daniel West
- Directed by: Richard R. Clark
- Starring: François Civil; Mirren Mack; Kit Harington; Sharon Duncan-Brewster; Guillaume Gallienne
- Composer: Samuel Sim
- Countries of origin: United Kingdom; United States
- Original languages: English; French
- No. of episodes: 4

Production
- Executive producers: Polly Williams; Sarah Best; Léo Becker; Kit Harington; Daniel West; Hong Khaou
- Producer: Simon Meyers
- Cinematography: Sergio Delgado
- Editors: Kim Gaster; Dan Crinnion
- Running time: 50–69 minutes
- Production companies: Federation Stories; Thriker Films; Federation Studio France; BBC Studios; MGM+ Studios

Original release
- Network: BBC One (UK)
- Network: MGM+ (US)
- Release: 6 September – 4 October 2026

A Tale of Two Cities is a 2026 four-part television historical drama created and written by Daniel West and directed by Richard R. Clark. It is adapted from the 1859 novel of the same name by Charles Dickens and stars François Civil and Kit Harington as look-alikes Charles Darnay and Sydney Carton, respectively, and Mirren Mack as Lucie Manette. It premiered on 6 September 2026 on MGM+. It received mixed reviews from critics.

== Cast and characters ==
=== Main ===
- François Civil as Charles Darnay
- Mirren Mack as Lucie Manette
- Kit Harington as Sydney Carton
- Sharon Duncan-Brewster as Hester Pross
- Guillaume Gallienne as Alexandre Manette

=== Supporting ===
- Fehinti Balogun as C.J. Stryver
- Theo Costa-Marini as Ernest Defarge
- Roxane Duran as Thérèse Defarge
- Yannick Renier as young Alexandre
- Layla Ingleby as young Luice
- Jules Balekdijan as young Ernest
- David Z. Miller as Jarvis Lorry
- Victoria Mackay as Alice
- Ian Pirie as John Barsad
- Barry Aird as Jerry Cruncher
- Thomas Blanchard as Gaspard
- Romy Baratin-Forest as Juliette
- Miklós Béres as Chevalier
- Vincent Schmitt as Théophile
- George Eggay as Innkeeper

== Production ==
=== Development ===
On 31 July 2025, it was reported that Kit Harington and François Civil would star on BBC One's adaptation of the novel A Tale of Two Cities by Charles Dickens, produced by Federation Stories in association with Thriker Films. The series is written by Daniel West, directed by Richard R. Clark, and produced by Simon Meyers. Executive producers are Polly Williams (also managing director) and Sarah Best for Federation Stories, Léo Becker for Federation Studio France, Harington and West for Thriker Films, Hong Khaou, and Michael Wright for MGM+.

=== Casting ===
On 17 September 2025, Harington was officially announced as Sydney Carton and Civil as Charles Darnay. The same day, Mirren Mack joined the cast as Lucie Manette. On 17 November 2025, Sharon Duncan-Brewster, Yannick Renier, Fehinti Balogun, Barry Aird, Roxane Duran, Theo Costa-Marini and Guillaume Gallienne joined the cast.

=== Filming ===
Principal photography was originally expected to begin in Budapest, Hungary in September 2025, but it was later postponed to 8 October 2025.

== Episodes ==
No.	Title	Directed by	Written by	Original U.K. airdate	Original U.S. airdate
1	"Recalled to Life"	Richard R. Clark	Daniel West	TBA	6 September 2026
2	"Malunion"	Richard R. Clark	Daniel West	TBA	13 September 2026
3	"Mother's Ruin"	Richard R. Clark	Daniel West	TBA	27 September 2026
4	"Resurrection Man"	Richard R. Clark	Daniel West	TBA	4 October 2026

== Release ==
In the UK, the series will be broadcast by BBC One in 2026. In the US, it premiered on MGM+ on 6 September 2026.

== Reception ==
The review aggregator website Rotten Tomatoes reported a 83% approval rating based on six critic reviews. Metacritic, which uses a weighted average, assigned a score of 56 out of 100, based on five critics, indicating "mixed or average" reviews.
