= Wildcat (2025 film) =

2025 film by Dominic Burns

- Theatrical release poster
- Directed by: James Nunn
- Written by: Dominic Burns
- Produced by: James Harris; Mark Lane; Dominic Burns; Crawford Anderson Dillon
- Starring: Kate Beckinsale; Lewis Tan; Rasmus Hardiker; Alice Krige; Bailey Patrick; Tom Bennett; Matt Willis; Roxy Striar
- Cinematography: Maja Zamojda
- Edited by: Ben Mills
- Music by: Si Begg
- Production companies: Capstone Pictures; Signature Entertainment; Ascending Media Group
- Distributed by: Aura Entertainment (United States); Amazon MGM Studios (via Prime Video, United Kingdom)
- Release dates: November 25, 2025 (United States); July 6, 2026 (United Kingdom)
- Running time: 100 minutes
- Countries: United States; United Kingdom
- Language: English

Wildcat is a 2025 action thriller film directed by James Nunn and written by Dominic Burns. It stars Kate Beckinsale, Lewis Tan, Rasmus Hardiker, Alice Krige, Bailey Patrick, Tom Bennett, Matt Willis, and Roxy Striar.

Wildcat was released in the United States on November 25, 2025.

== Premise ==
An ex–black ops team reunites to pull off a desperate heist and save the life of the leader's eight-year-old daughter.

== Cast ==
- Kate Beckinsale as Ada
- Lewis Tan as Roman
- Rasmus Hardiker as Edward
- Alice Krige as Christina Vine
- Bailey Patrick as Curtis
- Tom Bennett as Galloway
- Matt Willis as Lennie
- Roxy Striar as Jody
- Mathilde Warnier as Cia
- Charles Dance as Frasier Mahoney
- Isabelle Moxley as Charlotte

== Production ==
In July 2024, it was announced that Kate Beckinsale had been cast in an action thriller film titled Lioness, directed by James Nunn and written by Dominic Burns. In March 2025, principal photography began in the United Kingdom, with Lewis Tan, Rasmus Hardiker, Alice Krige, Bailey Patrick, Tom Bennett, Matt Willis, and Roxy Striar rounding out the cast. In October 2025, the film had been retitled to Wildcat.

== Release ==
Wildcat was released in the United States on November 25, 2025. The film was available in the United Kingdom on Prime Video on July 6, 2026.
