= Mirren Mack =

Scottish actress (born 1997)

- Born: 8 December 1997 (age 28); Stirling, Scotland
- Education: Guildhall School of Music and Drama (BA)
- Occupation: Actress
- Years active: 2016–present
- Television: Sex Education; The Nest

Mirren Mack (born 8 December 1997) is a Scottish actress. On television, she is known for her roles in the BBC series The Nest (2020) and A Tale of Two Cities (2026), the Netflix series The Witcher: Blood Origin (2022), and the Paramount+ series The Doll Factory (2023). She is also known for her theatre work.

== Early life ==
Mack was born in Stirling, Scotland. From a young age, she was exposed to the entertainment industry, with her father, Billy, being an actor and her mother, Callan, being a drama tutor. Her younger sister, Molly, is also an actress. With sister Molly, she danced at the Glasgow 2014 Commonwealth Games. Mack went to Riverside Primary school and then Wallace High School in Stirling, In year five at High School, Mack attended the Dance School of Scotland's Musical Theatre. In 2016, she received the Dewar Arts Award for outstanding Scottish talent in the arts, enabling her the opportunity to audition for a place at the Guildhall School of Music and Drama, where she studied a Bachelor of Arts in Acting.

== Career ==
=== Theatre ===
Mack made her professional acting debut in a stage production of Bat Boy as Mayor Maggie, at the Citizen's Theatre, for which she won the Musical Theatre Award and the drama award for her year.

Stage performances have included the play Wound by Philip Ridley in 2020. In 2022, as Ophelia in the Bristol Old Vic's adaption of Shakespeare's Hamlet. and the same year as Queenie in Small Island at the Royal National Theatre in London.

=== Film and television ===
In 2019, Mack made her television debut in three episodes of the Netflix series Sex Education as Florence. In 2020, Mack was cast in her first leading role as Kaya on the BBC drama series The Nest alongside Martin Compston and Sophie Rundle. Mack came out of Covid lockdown to appear in the seventh series of Portrait Artist of the Year on Sky Arts.

Mack began filming of the Netflix miniseries The Witcher: Blood Origin in August 2021, set in a time 1,200 years before The Witcher, and appeared in a main role as Princess Merwyn in a cast that includes Lenny Henry, Laurence O'Fuarain and Michelle Yeoh. The series was released on Netflix on 25 December 2022.

In 2024, she appeared as Katherine Villiers, Duchess of Buckingham in three episodes of the Sky Atlantic period drama Mary & George.

In September 2025, Mack was cast as Lucie Manette in the upcoming BBC One miniseries A Tale of Two Cities, adapted from the novel of the same name by Charles Dickens.

== Filmography ==
Key
†	Denotes films that have not yet been released

=== Film ===
Year	Title	Role	Notes
2021	Ladybaby	Rose	Short film
2021	Mudlarks	Ansel	Short film directed by Dominic Gilday
2022	Blood Rites	Rose	Short film
2022	The Painter & The Poet	Gemma	Short film
2023	My House	Carla	
2025	Hedda	Tabitha Greenwood	
2026	28 Years Later: The Bone Temple	Cathy	
2026	Arthur & Clara	Clara	Premiering at Austin Film Festival
TBA	Bare	TBA	Filming

=== Television ===
Year	Title	Role	Notes
2020	Sex Education	Florence	Recurring role; 3 episodes
2020	The Nest	Kaya	Main role; all 5 episodes
2020	Portrait Artist of the Year	Herself	7th series
2021	Dalgliesh	Maggie	Episodes 3 and 4
2022	The Witcher: Blood Origin	Merwyn	Miniseries
2023	The Doll Factory	Rose Whittle	Main role
2024	Strike	Edie Ledwell	Season 6; Recurring supporting role
2024	Mary & George	Katherine Villiers, Duchess of Buckingham	3 episodes
2025	Miss Austen	Dinah	Recurring role; all 4 episodes
2026	A Tale of Two Cities	Lucie Manette	Main role
TBA	Assassin's Creed †	TBA	Recurring role

=== Stage ===
Year	Title	Role	Director/writer/venue
2016	Bat Boy	Mayor Maggie	Graham Dickie
2017	The Seagull	Arkadina	Wyn Jones
2017	The Relapse	Amanda	Jonathan Humphreys
2017	Talk to the Dog	Girl	Ellis Howard
2017	Orphans	Helen	Brodie Ross
2018	Twelfth Night	Viola	Niamh Cusack
2018	The Bachai	Agave	Patsy Rodenburg
2018	Phaedra's Love	Phaedra	Wyn Jones
2018	Oklahoma!	Ado Annie	Christian Burgess
2018	Mercury Fur	Naz	John Haidar
2019	Orestes	Electra	Charlotte Gwinner
2019	Merrily We Roll Along	Joanne	Martin Connor
2020	The Beast of Blue Yonder (aborted due to Covid)	Chrissie / Mindy / Marilyn Monroe	Philip Ridley
2020	Wound (online play)	Her (lead)	Philip Ridley
2019	Orestes	Electra	Charlotte Gwinner
2019	Merrily We Roll Along	Joanne	Martin Connor
2022	Small Island	Queenie	Rufus Norris
2025	My Master Builder	Kaia	Lila Raicek

== Awards and nominations ==
Year	Award	Category	Work	Result	Ref.
2016	Dewar Arts Award	Outstanding Scottish Talent in the Arts		Won	
2020	BAFTA Scotland Award	Best Actress - Television	The Nest	Nominated	
2021	British Short Film Awards	Best Actress	Mudlarks	Nominated	
2021	British Short Film Awards	Best Acting Ensemble (shared with Naomi Preston-Low and Dominic Gilday)	Mudlarks	Won	
2021	Lift-Off Global Network, London	Best Acting Ensemble (shared with Naomi Preston-Low and Dominic Gilday)	Mudlarks	Won	
