= Bailey Patrick =

British actor

Bailey Patrick (Anthony Bailey) is an English actor. His credits include EastEnders (2016), People Just Do Nothing (2017–2018), Casualty (2018), Bodyguard (2018), Good Omens (2019), London Kills (2019), The Nest (2020), Top Boy )2023), Bridgerton (2022-2024), Andor (2025), Wildcat (2025), and Marching Powder (2025).

== Early life ==
Patrick was born in Reading and raised in London, he studied at the University of Salford alongside such contemporaries as Dan "the grass" Rees and Michael Fox who co-presented The Dan and Mike Show on Manchester radio online. He subsequently took a BA Hons Acting at Rose Bruford College and also briefly trained at Royal Shakespeare Company.

== Career ==
Patrick played the character Mike Rendon in the British soap opera EastEnders (2016). He played DC Rob in the BBC television series London Kills (2019), and played Callum in the BBC One television drama series The Nest (2020).

He starred in People Just Do Nothing (2017–2018), Casualty (2018), Bodyguard (2018), and Good Omens (2019).

He played DC Rob Brady London Kills from (2019-2022). He made appearances in Top Boy )2023), Bridgerton (2022-2024), and Andor (2025).

In 2025, he starred as Curtis in the film Wildcat (2025). and played Vinny, alongside Danny Dyer, in the British Football violence movie Marching Powder (2025).

=== Film ===
Year	Title	Role	Notes
2012	Evidence of Existence	Thug	
2014	Second Coming	Justin	
2015	Kicking Off	Brickie	
2016	Hard Time Bus	Shaun	
2018	One More	Chris	Short Film
2020	The Watchman	Policeman	TV movie
2025	Wildcat	Curtis	film
2025	Marching Powder	Vinny	film

=== Television ===
Year	Title	Role	Notes
2016	EastEnders	Mike Reardon	British soap opera 5 episodes
2017	Rellik	Man at Rave 2	S1 – episode #1.2
2017–2018	People Just Do Nothing	Kold FM Boss	TV series
2018	Casualty	Sergeant Graham / PC Rafe Graham	S32. episodes #32.18 & #32.36
2018	Bodyguard	Bodyguard	S1 episodes #1.3 & #1.4
2019	Good Omens	Spike	S1.E3 episode "Hard Times"
2019-2023	London Kills	DC Rob Brady	4 series, 20 episodes
2019	Secret Life of Boys	Naz	TV series
2020	The Nest	Callum	TV mini-series
2023	Top Boy	S5.E5 episode "Has Come to This"	
2022-2024	Bridgerton	Mr. Harris	3 episodes
2025	Andor	Corporal Amari	S2, E10 episode "Make Me Stop"

=== Theatre ===
Year	Title	Role	Notes
2012	Othello by William Shakespeare	Cassio	Shakespeare's Globe
2016	Peter Pan Goes Wrong by Henry Lewis	Trevor	Mischief Theatre
