= Finnich Glen =

Valley in Stirling, Scotland

Coordinates: 56.034°N 4.413°W

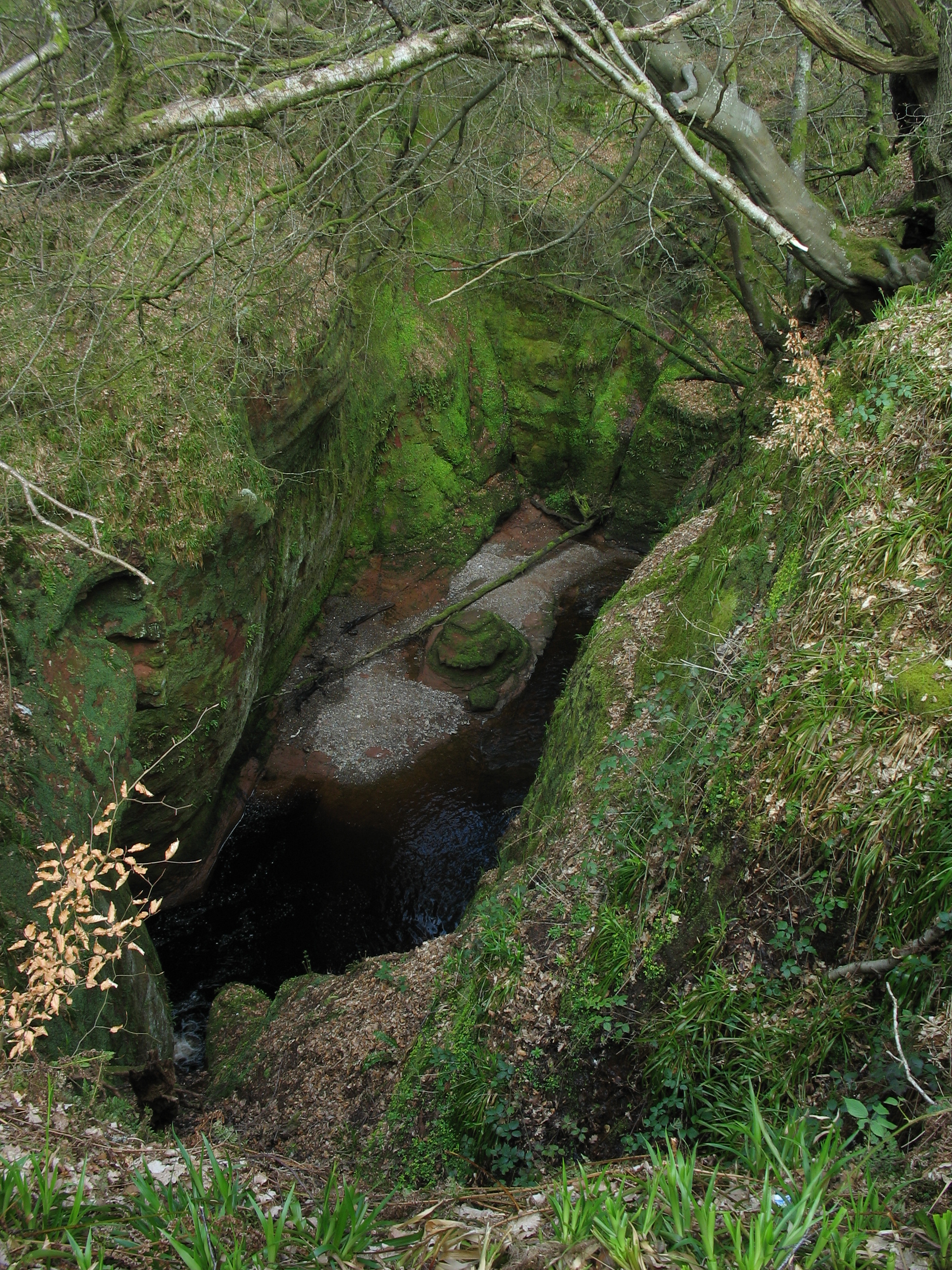
Devil's Pulpit in Finnich Glen, viewed from above

Finnich Glen in Stirlingshire, is a short, steep glen up to 70 ft deep which runs east from Finnich Bridge on the A809. It was carved from the red sandstone by the Carnock Burn.

It features a circular rock known as the Devil's Pulpit and a steep staircase known as the Devil's Steps, built around 1860.

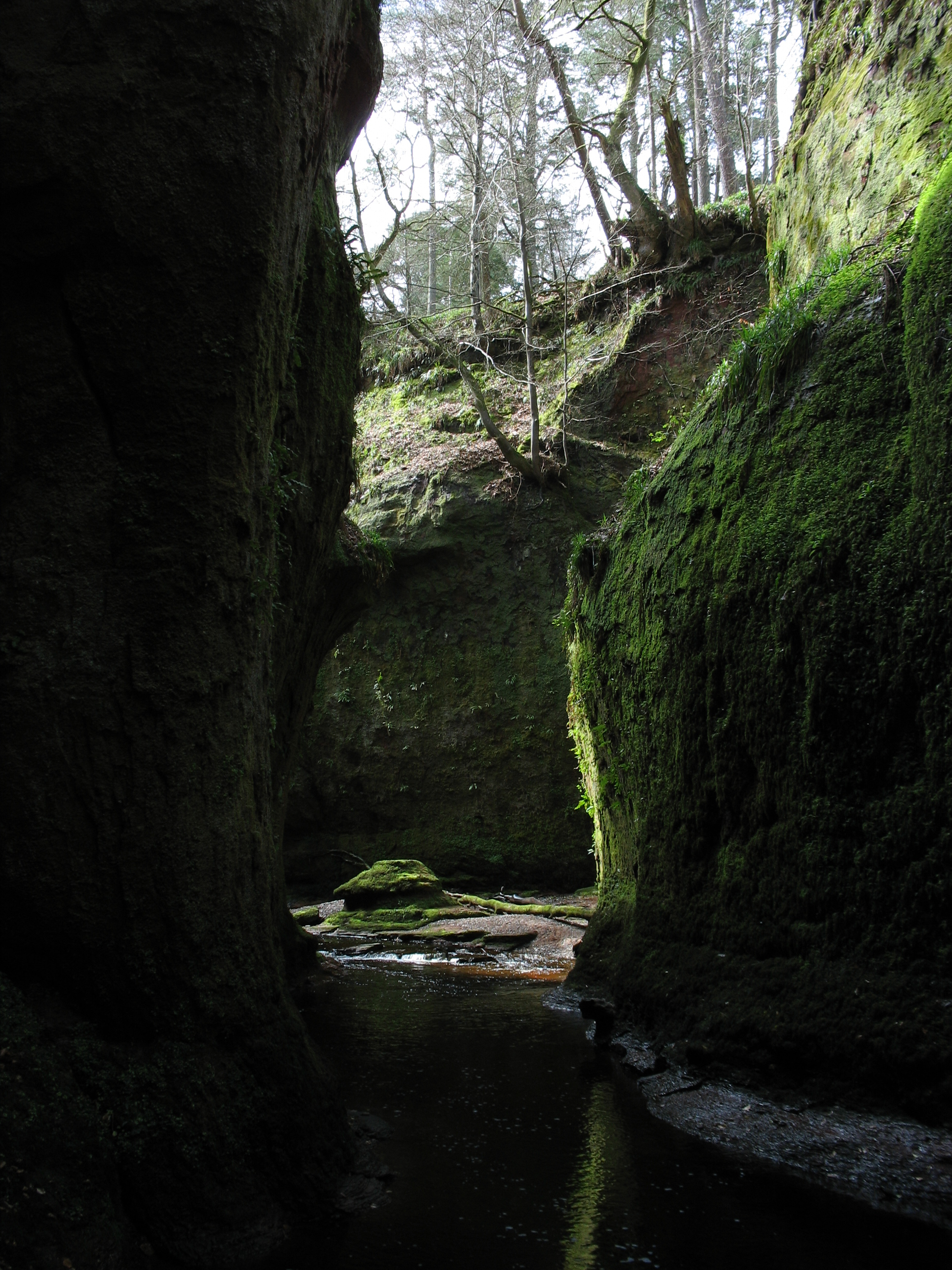
Devil's Pulpit in Finnich Glen looking east

Following its use to depict the fictional St Ninian's Spring in the time-traveling romance TV series Outlander in 2014, the site has seen an explosion in tourism, with an estimated 70,000 visitors now coming to the site each year. This has caused stress on both the location itself, and to tourists and local officials, as visitors have trampled fences to access the site and then scrambled down the crumbing, broken 200-year-old stone steps used to access the bed of the gorge, damaging the site and on numerous occasions requiring mountain rescue teams to be dispatched to the gorge for rescues. There being no parking facilities, the large influx of tourists have additionally left large numbers of vehicles parked along the side of the adjacent narrow rural road, blocking access for local residents and first responders. Under a £2 million development plan, landowner David Young has proposed to develop the site as a tourist attraction, including a visitor centre and restaurant, toilets, a 150-spot parking lot, formal "footpaths, viewing platforms and bridges above the gorge, and a new wood-and-metal staircase". The plan requires approval from the local council.

It also featured as a location in The Nest.
