= Lizzie Annis =

English actress

- Born: 1996 (age 29–30)
- Education: University of Bristol; Oxford School of Drama
- Occupation: Actress
- Years active: 2021–present

Lizzie Annis (born 1996) is an English actress. She won the 2023 Critics' Circle Theatre Award for Best Newcomer. She was named a 2022 Screen International Star of Tomorrow.

== Early life ==
Annis grew up in Kingston upon Thames, South West London where she became involved in youth theatre at the Rose Theatre. She gained an English literature degree at University of Bristol before graduating from the Oxford School of Drama in 2020.

== Career ==
=== Stage ===
Annis made her West End debut in the role of Laura Wingfield in Jeremy Herrin's adaptation of Tennessee Williams' play The Glass Menagerie at the Duke of York's Theatre, alongside Amy Adams. She won the Critics' Circle Theatre Award for Best Newcomer for her role in 2023. She also received nominations as Best Newcomer in the Stage Debut Awards and the Evening Standard Theatre Awards.

In 2023, she joined The House of Bernarda Alba alongside Harriet Walter at the Royal National Theatre.

=== Television ===
In 2022, she could be seen as elfin mage Zacaré in The Witcher: Blood Origin for Netflix. That year, she was named a Screen International Star of Tomorrow.

She played Jade in Emma Moran's superpower comedy series Extraordinary on Disney+ in 2024. In late 2024, she was cast in British crime drama Under Salt Marsh, alongside Kelly Reilly, Harry Lawtey and Jonathan Pryce, amongst others.

== Personal life ==
She has cerebral palsy.

== Filmography ==
Key
†	Denotes works that have not yet been released

Year	Title	Role	Notes
2022	The Witcher: Blood Origin	Zacaré	
2024	Extraordinary	Jade	
2026	Under Salt Marsh	Cara	
