= Under Salt Marsh =

British television series

- Genre: Crime thriller
- Created by: Claire Oakley
- Written by: Claire Oakley; Jonathan Harbottle; Nikita Lalwani
- Directed by: Claire Oakley; Mary Nighy
- Starring: Kelly Reilly; Rafe Spall; Naomi Yang; Harry Lawtey; Lizzie Annis; Dino Fetscher; Brian Gleeson; Dinita Gohil; Kimberley Nixon; Mark Stanley; Julian Lewis Jones; Jonathan Pryce
- Country of origin: United Kingdom
- Original language: English
- No. of series: 1
- No. of episodes: 6

Production
- Executive producers: Elwen Rowlands; Claire Oakley; Kelly Reilly
- Producer: Scott James Bassett
- Running time: 47–55 minutes
- Production companies: Little Door Productions; Sky Studios

Original release
- Network: Sky Atlantic
- Release: 30 January 2026 – present

Under Salt Marsh is a British crime thriller television series created by Claire Oakley and starring Kelly Reilly and Rafe Spall in the lead roles. Filmed in Wales, the series is set in the fictional North Wales village of Morfa Halen. The series premiered on 30 January 2026 on Sky Atlantic. In August 2026, it was renewed for a second series.

== Premise ==
As a huge storm starts to form far out at sea, Jackie Ellis, a teacher and former detective, finds the body of her 8-year-old student, Cefin Hill, who appears to have drowned. This shocking discovery stirs up the town's memories of an unresolved case from three years earlier: the disappearance of Jackie's niece, Nessa. The failure to find the girl cost Ellis her police career.

Cefin's death brings back Jackie's former partner, Detective Eric Bull, to lead the investigation in a community where he had previously failed. Believing the two cases are connected, Ellis and Bull must work together to uncover hidden secrets in Morfa Halen before the storm hits and wipes away any evidence.

== Cast ==
=== Main ===
- Kelly Reilly as Jackie Ellis
- Rafe Spall as Detective Eric Bull
- Naomi Yang as Detective Jess Deng
- Harry Lawtey as Dylan Rees
- Lizzie Annis as Cara Rees
- Dino Fetscher as Gareth Evans
- Brian Gleeson as Mac Jones
- Dinita Gohil as Nisha Jones
- Kimberley Nixon as Shell Hill
- Mark Stanley as Danny Hill
- Julian Lewis Jones as Osian Northam
- Jonathan Pryce as Solomon Bevan

=== Supporting ===
- Rhodri Meilir as Ned Bevan
- Eiry Thomas as Irene Hassan

== Episodes ==
No.	Title	Directed by	Written by	Original release date
1	"Episode 1"	Claire Oakley	Claire Oakley	30 January 2026
2	"Episode 2"	Claire Oakley	Claire Oakley	30 January 2026
3	"Episode 3"	Mary Nighy	Jonathan Harbottle	6 February 2026
4	"Episode 4"	Mary Nighy	Nikita Lalwani	13 February 2026
5	"Episode 5"	Claire Oakley	Jonathan Harbottle	20 February 2026
6	"Episode 6"	Claire Oakley	Claire Oakley	27 February 2026

== Production ==
=== Development ===
The six-part series is created by Claire Oakley, who also directs with Mary Nighy. Scott Bassett serves as the series producer while Oakley executive produces alongside Elwen Rowlands for Little Door Productions and Megan Spanjian for Sky Studios. Kelly Reilly was cast in the lead role in August 2024.

On August 26, 2026, it was renewed for a second series. Spall will reprise his role, with the new setting being a village in Scotland.

=== Casting ===
In October 2024, the full cast for the series was announced, with Rafe Spall, Jonathan Pryce, Naomi Yang, and Harry Lawtey in main roles while the supporting cast includes Dinita Gohil, Brian Gleeson, Kimberley Nixon, Mark Stanley, Dino Fetscher, Lizzie Annis, Rhodri Meilir, and Julian Lewis Jones. Prior to the show's release, Nation.Cymru criticised the casting, due to the majority of main roles being filled by English actors, although the series was characterised as Welsh, and was set and filmed in Wales.

=== Filming ===
Principal photography began in October 2024, with the production taking place entirely in Wales. Locations used include Barmouth, Fairbourne, Anglesey, and South Wales. Support for the project comes from Creative Wales.

== Broadcast ==
The six-episode series premiered on 30 January 2026 on Sky Atlantic.

== Reception ==
=== Critical response ===
The review aggregator website Rotten Tomatoes reported an 100% approval rating, based on six reviews, with an average of rated reviews of 7.3/10.

=== Accolades ===
In September 2026, the series received three nominations at the BAFTA Cymru Awards.
