= Sunil Patel (comedian) =

Stand-up comedian, actor and podcaster

- Born: Sunil Dinesh Patel; 1980/1981; Bath, England
- Occupations: Stand-up comedian, actor and podcaster
- Years active: 2010–present
- Website: www.sunilpatelcomedy.com

Sunil Dinesh Patel (born 1980/1981) is an English stand-up comedian, actor and podcaster.

== Early life ==
Patel grew up on Fairfield Avenue in Bath and attended King Edward's School. Patel first became interested in stand-up comedy when he bought Lee Evans Live on VHS. After working odd jobs throughout his 20s, at 29, he lived in a flatshare with Irish comedian Rob Broderick, who encouraged him to give stand-up a try.

== Career ==
Patel's first gig was in 2010 at the George Pub on London's Strand. He was a finalist for the 2012 BBC New Comedy Award, Piccadilly Comedy Club's New Comedian of 2013, the Laughing Horse New Act of the Year, and Best Newcomer at the Chortle Awards.

Patel collaborated with Josh Ross in 2013 and Nick Dixon on Two Wrongs in 2014 before going on to headline his own Edinburgh Fringe comedy shows Juicer and Titan in 2016 and 2017 respectively.

Patel made his television acting debut in the recurring role of Sujan Stevens in the 2016 Channel 5 mockumentary Borderline.

Patel featured as a fact-master in the 2018 Dave game show Beat the Internet with John Robins. In 2019, Patel co-hosted the podcast But… Where Are You Really From? with Eshaan Akbar and Nimisha Odedra for the BBC Asian Network. His next comedy show was White Knight, which premiered at the Aberystwyth Comedy Festival.

During the COVID-19 pandemic, Patel did a number of guest roles and comedy web series such as Save the Bill Murray, Backchat, and Pulped. He returned to live stand-up with Faster Horses at the Hastings Fringe Comedy Festival. The following year, he had a comedy special in Live at Moth Club, put on Monkey Barrel at Edinburgh, and featured in the HowTheLightGetsIn Festival. Also in 2022, Patel made his feature film debut as Phil in Brian and Charles, hosted the parody podcast Sunil Patel: An Idiot's Guide To Cryptocurrency for BBC Radio 4, and started the podcast Slime Country with Hugh Davies.

In addition to Sunil Patel: WIP at Edinburgh, Patel wrote the 2023 Sky Arts short Silo, appeared in A Whole Lifetime with Jamie Demetriou on Netflix, and had his own comedy special on Comedy Central. In 2024, Patel played Paul in the Channel 4 romantic drama Alice & Jack and Solicitor Adam in the BBC Three sitcom Things You Should Have Done. He appeared in the romantic comedy And Mrs and the Sky Max film Bad Tidings. He once again hosted Sunil Patel: An Idiot's Guide To Bagging An Heiress for BBC Radio 4 and co-hosted the podcast Rural Concerns with Chris Cantrill.

== Filmography ==
=== Film ===
Year	Title	Role	Notes
2019	I Want to Make You Happy	Phil	Short film
2021	I'm Not in Love	Sunil	
2022	Brian and Charles	Phil	
2023	Love at First Sight	Guest	
2023	The Toxic Avenger	Dr Walla (who means well)	
2024	And Mrs		
TBA	Misper	Khalid	

=== Television ===
Year	Title	Role	Notes
2016–2017	Borderline	Sujan Stevens	9 episodes
2016	Frightbusters	Ali	Sky Arts short
2017	Bobby and Harriet Get Married	Himself	5 episodes
2018	Stath Lets Flats	Phil Khoo	Episode: "A Completely Football"
2018	The Big Asian Stand-Up	Himself	1 episode
2018–2019	Beat the Internet	Himself – fact-master	Quiz show
2021	Bloods	Firefighter	Episode: "Daycare"
2021	This Time with Alan Partridge	Doctor	1 episode
2021	This Way Up	Doctor Kumar	1 episode
2022, 2024	Mandy	Call Handler / Surgeon	2 episodes
2022
2022	Lazy Susan	Radio producer	3 episodes
2022	The Witchfinder	Landlord	1 episode
2022	Documentary Now!	Zookeeper	Episode: "My Monkey Grifter"
2022	Live at The Moth Club	Himself	Comedy special
2023	Silo	Dipesh	Writer, Sky Arts short
2023	A Whole Lifetime with Jamie Demetriou	Tom	Comedy special
2023	Comedy Central Live	Himself	Episode: "Sunil Patel"
2024	Alice & Jack	Paul	6 episodes
2024	Things You Should Have Done	Adam Farrow	3 episodes
2024	Beyond Paradise	PC Billy Blake	1 episode
2024	Bad Tidings	Raj	Sky Max film

=== Web ===
Year	Title	Role	Notes
2017	Reaction Crew	Mark	Main role
2017	Habits	Sunil	Episode: "Arrogance"
2019	Content	Sunil	Episode: "Brand Deal"
2021	Save The Bill Murray	Sunil	Main role, 5 episodes
2021	Backchat	Ash Patel	Spoof talk show
2021	Pulped	Various	Shorts
2021	The Artists	Professor Mystico	2 episodes
2022	Late Night Forever! with Jordan Brookes		Comedy Blaps
2023	Don't Overthink It	Burglar	Miniseries

== Stage ==
Year	Title	Role	Notes
2012	Tales from the Unaccepted		Edinburgh Festival Fringe
2013	Josh Ross and Sunil Patel		Edinburgh Festival Fringe
2014	Nick Dixon and Sunil Patel: Two Wrongs		Edinburgh Festival Fringe
2016	Sunil Patel: Juicer		Edinburgh Festival Fringe
2017	Sunil Patel: Titan		Edinburgh Festival Fringe
2019	White Knight		Aberystwyth Comedy Festival; Edinburgh Festival Fringe
2021–2022	Sunil Patel: Faster Horses		Hastings Fringe Comedy Festival; Machynlleth Comedy Festival; Wells Comedy Festival; Edinburgh Festival Fringe
2022	Monkey Barrel		Edinburgh Festival Fringe
2022	HowTheLightGetsIn Festival		
2023	Sunil Patel: WIP		Edinburgh Festival Fringe

== Audio ==
Year	Title	Role	Notes
2018–2022	Why is Harriet Crying?	Himself – co-host	Podcast
2019	But... Where Are You Really From?	Himself – host	BBC Asian Network podcast
2022	Sunil Patel: An Idiot's Guide To Cryptocurrency	Himself – host	BBC Radio 4 podcast
2022–2023	Slime Country	Himself – host	Podcast with Huge Davies and Ed Night
2023	Big Little Questions	Various	BBC Radio 4 comedy
2023	Nora Meadows' Week of Wellness	Brian / Anthony	BBC Radio 4 sitcom
2024	Sunil Patel: An Idiot's Guide To Bagging An Heiress	Himself – host	BBC Radio 4 podcast
2024–present	Rural Concerns	Himself – co-host	Podcast
