= Amira El Sayed =

Egyptian and Austrian actress (born 1991)

- Born: June 3, 1991 (age 35); Innsbruck, Austria
- Occupation: Actress
- Years active: 2009–present

Amira El Sayed is an Austrian actress and author based in Vienna, Austria.

Amira El Sayed was born on the 3 June 1991 in Innsbruck, Austria. She is the only child of Erika El Sayed, an Austrian language and history teacher and Adel El Sayed, a university teacher and political scientist from Egypt. Amira was raised bilingual and is a native speaker of both Arabic and German. She spent her early years living in Alexandria, Egypt before she moved back to Innsbruck with her parents.

At the age of 16 Amira moved to Vienna where she later studied acting at the renowned Max Reinhardt Seminar. Amongst others she was taught by Klaus Maria Brandauer. She left University in the first year to play a part in Paul Schrader’s The Cleopatra Club, a theatre play directed by Rupert Henning, where she was discovered by her first agent.

Her first international film was 2016's A Hologram for the King, starring Tom Hanks and directed by Tom Tykwer. In 2017, she went on to appear in the Swiss television series Wilder (SRF) and the Norddeutscher Rundfunk film Der Richter (director Markus Imboden). Her most recent work involves roles in Ransom in 2018, Deutschland 86 in 2018, Riviera (TV series) in 2019, Hanna (TV series) in 2021 and the HBO MAX Spy/Master in 2023

Amira El Sayed is also the author of the book, titled Klang der Freiheit (The Sound of Freedom) which was published in 2013 by the Austrian publishing house Letter P. She currently lives in Vienna, Austria.

== Filmography ==
Year	Title	Role
2013	Alles Schwindel	
2013	Die Verbotene Frau	Daima
2013	Paul Kemp – Alles kein Problem	Frauke
2013	Paul Kemp – Alles kein Problem	Frauke
2014	Schleierhaft (short)	Mother
2015	Vier Frauen und ein Todesfall	Nasreen Naguib
2015	Brittany Mystery	Lilou Breval
2015	Großstadtrevier	
2016	Hotel Rock’n’Roll	Glory
2016	A Hologram for the King	Maha
2016	Vienna Crime Squad	Leyla Allawi
2017	Letzte Spur Berlin	
2017	Der Richter	
2017	Wilder	Amina Al-Baroudi
2018	Das Institut – Oase des Scheiterns	
2018	Ransom	Sofia Cardenas
2018	Deutschland 86	Samira
2019	Riviera (TV series)	Salma
2021	Hanna (TV series)	Anne
2022	Spy/Master (HBO)	Safiya (main cast)

== Publications ==
- Klang der Freiheit, Letter P, Vienna 2013, ISBN 978-3-9503168-4-1
