= Naomi Yang (actress) =

British-Chinese actress (born 1989)

- Yang Yichen
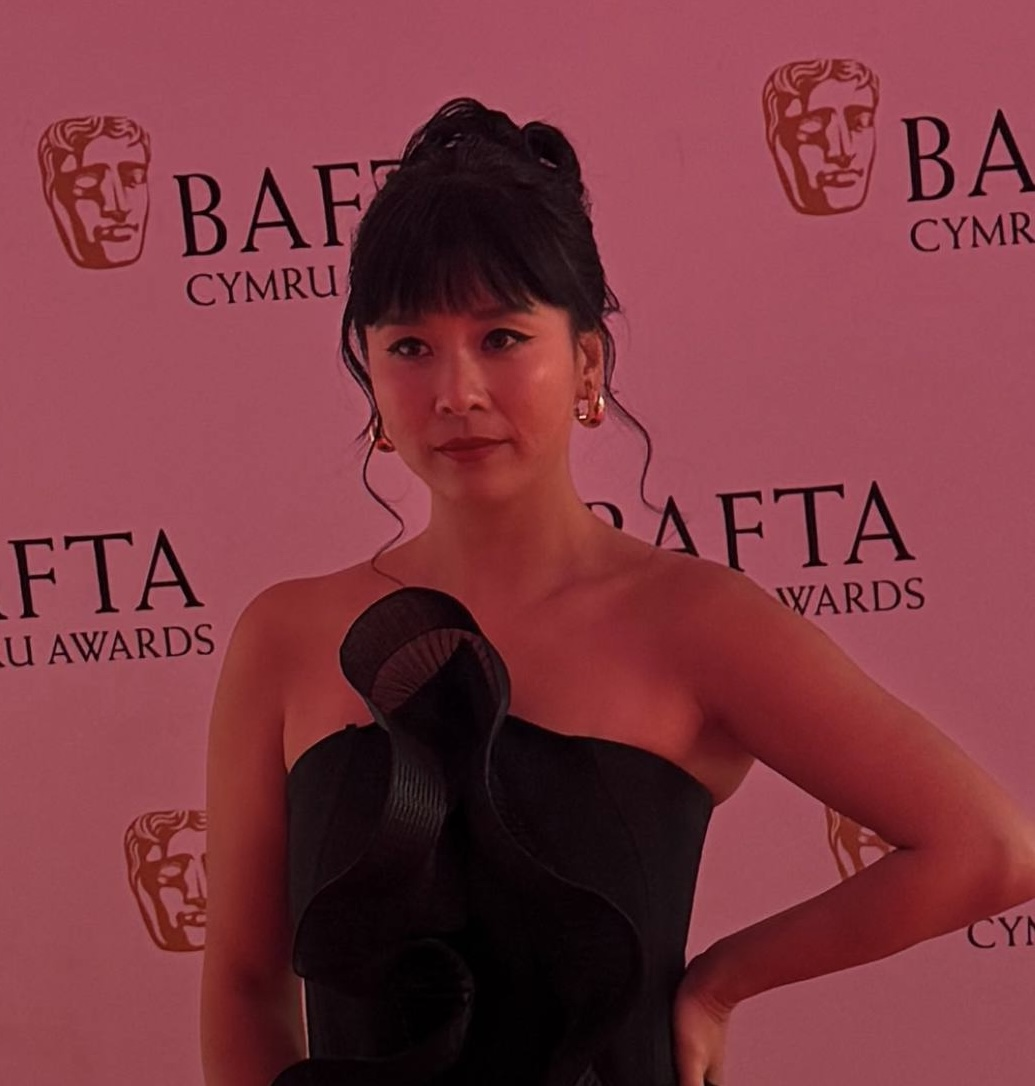
- Born: 19 March 1989 (age 37); Beijing, China
- Occupation: Actress
- Years active: 2014 - present

Naomi Yang, born Yang Yichen, is a Chinese-born British actress. She is best known for her roles in the BAFTA-nominated film Lilting and Sky TV series Wolfe. She voices Sage in FPS video game Valorant, and also Needle Knight Leda in Elden Ring Shadow of the Erdtree.

== Early life and education ==
Yang was born in Beijing, China, and moved to the UK at the age of six. She grew up in Manchester.

== Career ==
Yang's first role was as Vann in the 2014 film Lilting, directed by Hong Khaou.

Yang's television credits include Paul Abbott's Sky series Wolfe, where she played awkward child prodigy Maggy. She also starred as Mae Zhang in ITV’s Maternal, Joy Fu in Channel 4 drama Chimerica, and Li in Peaky Blinders.

On stage, she has performed as Tsukiko in the Royal Shakespeare Company’s Olivier-nominated show My Neighbour Totoro.

She voices Sage in the popular video game Valorant, and Needle Knight Leda in Elden Ring: Shadow of the Erdtree.

== Recognition and awards ==
In 2020, Yang was selected as one of the actors for BAFTA Elevate.

== Filmography ==
=== Television ===
Year	Title	Role	Notes
2016	New Blood	Susan Chen (as Naomi Yichen Christie)	Episode: Case 2, Part 2
2016	DCI Banks	Wei Li (as Naomi Christie)	Season 5 (2 episodes)
2016	Hollyoaks	Dr. Smith (as Naomi Yichen Christie)	Episode: #1.4555
2017	Armchair Detectives	Connie Chung (as Naomi Yichen Christie)	Episode: "Appetite for Murder"
2018	Mars	Zhenzhen Yow (as Naomi Christie)	Season 2 (4 episodes)
2019	Chimerica	Joy Fu	Season 1 (4 episodes)
2019	Deep Water	Miss King	Miniseries (3 episodes)
2019	Brassic	Dr. Nicola Jones	Episode: #1.3
2019	A Confession	Penny	Miniseries (1 episode)
2020	Endeavour	Nancy	Episode: "Zenana"
2020	The Salisbury Poisonings	Maya	Miniseries (2 episodes)
2020	Brave New World	Vivian	Miniseries (3 episodes)
2021	Wolfe	Maggy	Main role
2022	Screw	Miss Malone	Episode: #1.5
2022	Shakespeare & Hathaway: Private Investigators	Helena Mau	Episode: "If It Be Man's Work"
2022	Peaky Blinders	Li	Season 6 (3 episodes)
2023	Maternal	Mae Zhang	Season 1 (4 episodes)
2023	Liaison	Shahina	Season 1 (4 episodes)
2024	D.I. Ray	Hiroka McGregor	Season 2 (5 episodes)
2024	Nightsleeper	Kate Nisbet	3 episodes
2026	Under Salt Marsh	Detective Jess Deng	Limited series (6 episodes)
2026	Vigil	Shen Jia	Season 3 (5 episodes)

=== Films ===
Year	Title	Role	Notes
2014	Lilting	Vann (as Naomi Christie)	

=== Video Games ===
Year	Title	Role	Notes
2020–present	Valorant	Sage	
2020	Valorant	Sage	TV series (episode: "Duellists")
2023	Synced	Glory	
2023	Diablo IV	Additional Voices	
2024	Elden Ring Shadow of the Erdtree	Needle Knight Leda	

=== Theatre credits ===
Year	Title	Role	Venue
2016	World Factory	Jenny(as Naomi Christie)	Multiple Venues
2016	The Sugar-Coated Bullets of the Bourgeoisie	Sange(as Naomi Yichen Christie)	Arcola Theatre, London
2019	Top Girls	Jeanine	National Theatre, London
2023	My Neighbour Totoro	Tsukiko	Barbican Centre, London
