= Parker Sawyers =

American actor (born 1983)

- Sawyers in 2023
- Born: May 24, 1983 (age 43)
- Occupation: Actor
- Years active: 2012–present
- Spouse: Edita Ubartaite
- Children: 2; including Winston Sawyers

Parker Sawyers (born May 24, 1983) is an American actor based in London. His films include Southside with You (2016) and Monsoon (2019). On television, he is known for his roles in the Netflix series Pine Gap (2018), the BBC One series World on Fire (2019–2023) and the Starz series P-Valley (2020–).

== Early life ==
He is the son of Paula Parker-Sawyers (now Means), who was deputy mayor of Indianapolis from 1989 to 1991, and James Sawyers, a teacher and administrator.

== Career ==
His first leading film role was starring as a young Barack Obama in Southside With You. He is also featured in Don't Hang Up as Mr. Lee. He also stars as the Parisian jazz musician, Albert Fallou, in the BBC production World on Fire.

== Personal life ==
Sawyers lives in West London with his Lithuanian wife and their two children. He is the father of Winston Sawyers, the young actor who played the role of Ralph in Lord of the Flies (TV series).

== Filmography ==
=== Film ===
Year	Title	Role	Notes
2012	Hyde Park on Hudson	Thomas	
2012	Zero Dark Thirty	Interrogator on Monitor	
2013	Austenland	Alexander	
2013	Drone	Drone Operator	Short
2013	Kick-Ass 2	Blast Hammer	
2014	Jack Ryan: Shadow Recruit	Corpsman	
2014	Monsters: Dark Continent	Shaun Williams	
2015	Survivor	Ray	
2016	Southside with You	Barack Obama	
2016	The Call Up	Andre	
2016	Snowden	CIA Interviewer	
2016	The Autopsy of Jane Doe	Trooper Cole	
2016	Don't Hang Up	Mr. Lee	
2017	Sand Castle	Sgt. Robinson	
2017	Megan Leavey	Navy Corpsman	
2017	The Mummy	Co-Pilot	
2018	Greta	Gary	
2019	Monsoon	Lewis	
2022	The Nan Movie	Walter	
2022	Infinite Storm	Patrick	
2022	The Lost Girls	Adam	
2023	Operation Fortune: Ruse de Guerre	Connors	
2025	Jay Kelly	Props	
2026	Her Private Hell	Terry	

=== Television ===
Year	Title	Role	Notes
2012	Lilyhammer	Deshawna	Episode: "My Kind of Town"
2014	The Assets	Matt	Episode: "Avenger"
2017	Easy	Jason	Episode: "Open Marriage"
2018	Succession	Alessandro Daniels	Episode: "Celebration"
2018	Pine Gap	Gus Thomson	Main cast
2018–2019	Deep State	Napier	Recurring cast: season 1, guest: season 2
2019	Cheat	Stephan	Main cast
2019–2023	World on Fire	Albert Fallou	Main cast
2020–present	P-Valley	Andre Watkins	Main cast
2022	A Discovery of Witches	Ransome Fayrweather	Recurring cast: season 3
2023	Spy/Master	Frank Jackson	Main cast
2025	The Bombing of Pan Am 103	Phil Reid	4 episodes

=== Video games ===
Year	Title	Role	Notes
2016	Battlefield 1	Narrator - Harlem Hellfighter	
2017	Dragon Quest XI: Echoes of an Elusive Age	Vince, Additional Voices	
2017	Star Wars: Battlefront II	Voice Talent, Acting Talent	
2018	Detroit: Become Human	Josh	
