= Spy/Master =

Romanian spy thriller television series

- Genre: Spy thriller
- Created by: Adina Sădeanu; Kirsten Peters
- Written by: Adina Sădeanu; Kirsten Peters
- Directed by: Christopher Smith
- Starring: Alec Secăreanu; Parker Sawyers; Ana Ularu; Svenja Jung
- Composer: Lukasz Targosz
- Country of origin: Romania
- Original languages: Romanian; English; German; Arabic; Russian
- No. of episodes: 6

Production
- Executive producers: Johnathan Young; Anke Greifeneder; Antony Root
- Producers: Ioannina Pavel; Viktória Petrányi; Tudor Reu; Judit Sós
- Production locations: Hungary, Romania
- Editor: Stuart Gazzard
- Running time: 50 minutes
- Production companies: Mobra Films; Proton Cinema

Original release
- Network: HBO Max
- Release: 19 May – 16 June 2023

Spy/Master is a Romanian fictional Cold War spy thriller television series created by Adina Sădeanu and Kirsten Peters and starring Alec Secăreanu. Set in 1978 and filmed in Hungary and Romania, the series is loosely based on the real-life defection of Romanian spymaster Ion Mihai Pacepa. The series was produced by Mobra Films (Romania) and Proton Cinema (Hungary) for HBO Romania and Warner TV Serie and premiered on HBO Max in May 2023.

== Plot ==
Victor Godeanu (Alec Secăreanu) is the director of the Romanian Ministry of External Affairs and a trusted confidant of Romanian dictator Nicolae Ceaușescu (Claudiu Bleonț) and his wife Elena (Elvira Deatcu). Godeanu is secretly working for the Soviets but, with Romanian counter-intelligence about to expose him, decides to defect to the West. Whilst on a diplomatic trip to Bonn in West Germany to negotiate the repatriation of ethnic Germans living in Romania, Godeanu hands himself in at the American Embassy. CIA agent Frank Jackson (Parker Sawyers) is tasked with interrogating Godeanu who demands that the Americans extradite his daughter Ileana (Alexandra Bob) from Romania before he reveals classified information. An enraged Ceaușescu sends a team of spies to West Germany to kidnap and kill Godeanu as Jackson struggles to persuade his superiors to allow Godeanu into the USA. Intelligence agencies from five countries - Romania, USA, Soviet Union, East Germany and West Germany - become embroiled in the defection. Meanwhile, in an intertwined plot, a group of Egyptian militants try to scupper the Camp David peace negotiations between Egypt and Israel by bombing an Israeli target in Bonn.

== Production ==
Spy/Master was filmed in Budapest, Hungary and Bucharest, Romania. All external scenes set in Bonn were filmed in Budapest with notable landmarks such as Déli station, Keleti station, Margaret Island, Frankel Leo Street Synagogue and the University of Technology and Economics doubling for locations in Bonn.

== Cast ==
- Alec Secăreanu as Victor Godeanu
- Parker Sawyers as Frank Jackson
- Ana Ularu as Carmen Popescu
- Svenja Jung as Ingrid von Weizendorff
- Laurențiu Bănescu as Mircea Voinea
- Iulian Postelnicu as Sorin Rancea
- Aidan McArdle as Walter Simpson
- Nico Mirallegro as John Miller
- Brian Caspe as George Tenet (Riley)
- Conor Lowson as Scott Dunlop
- Marc Rissmann as Klaus Johan
- Andreea Vasile as Adela Godeanu
- Alexandra Bob as Ileana Godeanu
- Claudiu Bleont as Nicolae Ceaușescu
- Elvira Deatcu as Elena Ceaușescu
- Mido Hamada as Jabare Hassan
- Amira El Sayed as Safiya Fahim
- Omar El-Saeidi as Omar Fahim

== Broadcast ==
The first two episodes of Spy/Master were premiered at the Berlin International Film Festival in February 2023. The entire series premiered globally on HBO Max on 19 May 2023. The series premiered in Germany on Warner TV Serie on 16 November 2023. The series premiered in the UK on BBC Four on 4 May 2024.

== Awards ==
Spy/Master was nominated for the inaugural Berlinale Series Award in 2023. The series won NEM Award for Best Drama TV Series in the Central and Eastern European region at NEM Zagreb in December 2023.
