= Fiona Bell =

British actress

- Born: Rosneath, Argyll and Bute, Scotland
- Education: Royal Scottish Academy of Music and Drama
- Occupation: Actress
- Years active: 1988–present
- Television: Soldier Soldier; Shetland; The Nest
- Spouse: Conor Mullen (m. 1997)
- Children: 4

Fiona Bell is a Scottish actress, known for her role as Sergeant Angela McLeod in the ITV drama series Soldier Soldier (1997–1998), as Donna Killick in the BBC One crime drama series Shetland (2018) and as Hilary in the BBC One drama series The Nest (2020). Bell was born in Rosneath then part of Dunbartonshire, Scotland.

== Career ==
She took an interest in acting and joined the Scottish Youth Theatre, Glasgow at the age of 15. She graduated from the Royal Scottish Academy of Music and Drama with a BA Dramatic Arts degree in 1989.

== Filmography ==
=== Film ===
Year	Title	Role	Notes
1988	The Chalk Mark	Friend of Family	Short film
1996	Trainspotting	Diane's Mother	
1999	Duck	Carmen	Short film
1999	Between Dreams	Judith	Short film
1999	Gregory's Two Girls	Maddy Underwood	
2000	I Saw You		Short film
2001	The Legend of Loch Lomond	Moira	Short film
2003	Afterlife	Lucy	
2005	The Man-Eating Wolves of Gysinge	Catharina	TV film
2006	Low Winter Sun	Sheena Baillie	TV film
2012	Loving Miss Hatto	Woman Journalist	TV film
2018	Royally Ever After	Marie Dimarco	TV film
2021	Finding You	Nora Callaghan	

=== Television ===
Year	Title	Role	Notes
1995	The Bill	Jackie Laine	Episode: "Memorial"
1996	Screen One	Maggie	Episode: "Truth or Dare"
1996–1997	Soldier Soldier	Sergeant Angela McCleod AGC	Recurring role, 16 episodes
1999	Casualty	April Spencer	Episode: "To Have and to Hold"
1999	Taggart	Francesca	Episodes: "A Fistful of Chips" & "Fearful Lightning"
2000	The Creatives	Joanna	Episode: "By The Way"
2000	Doctors	D.C. Jane Lynch	Episode: "A Matter of Community"
2000	City Central	Lou	Episode: "Respect"
2000–2002	EastEnders	P.C. Elaine Monks	Recurring role, 3 episodes
2002	Rockface	Heather	Episode: "Situation: Critical"
2003	Paradise Heights	Angie	Episode: "Series 1, Episode 1"
2004	Casualty	Mel Johnson	Episode: "The Ties That Bind Us"
2008	Taggart	Rachel Brown	Episode: "Lifeline"
2010	Jack Taylor	Brenda Meyers	Episode: "Headstone"
2016	Storyland	Aoife Jennings	Episode: "Costigan"
2017	Acceptable Risk	Alisa Bell	Episode: "Series 1, Episode 3"
2018–2021	Shetland	Donna Killick	Recurring role, 10 episodes
2020	Blood	Gillian Mooney	Series regular, 6 episodes
2020	The Nest	Hilary	Series regular, 5 episodes
2020	Dead Still	Abigail Vickers	Miniseries, 2 episodes
2021	Kin	Angela Cunningham	Recurring role 3 episodes
2022	Crime	Moira Gulliver	3 episodes
2023	A Merry Scottish Christmas	Josephine Morgan	TV movie

=== Theatre ===
Year	Title	Author	Role	Director	Theatre	Ref
1996	Cyrano de Bergerac	Edmond Rostand	Roxane	Gerry Mulgrew and Andy Farrell	Communicado	
2001	Henry VI & Richard III	William Shakespeare	Margaret	Michael Boyd	Royal Shakespeare Company, London	
2010	Liaisons dangereuses (Dangerous Liaisons)	Pierre Choderlos de Laclos	Marquise Isabelle de Merteuil	Christopher Hampton	Gate Theatre, Dublin	
2015	A Midsummer Night's Dream	William Shakespeare	Hippolyta & Titania	Gavin Quinn	Abbey Theatre, Dublin	
2015	Oedipus		Jocasta	Wayne Jordan	Abbey Theatre, Dublin	
2016	The Father	Florian Zeller	Anne	Ethan McSweeny	Gate Theatre, Dublin	
2016	Who's Afraid of Virginia Woolf?	Edward Albee	Marie Menken	David Grindley	Gate Theatre, Dublin	
2017	Tribes	Nina Raine	Beth	Oonagh Murphy	Gate Theatre, Dublin	

== Personal life ==
Bell is married to Irish actor Conor Mullen, who she met on the set of Soldier Soldier in 1997. She moved to Ireland in 1997 to get married and lives in Howth, County Dublin with her husband and their four children: Keir, Hannah, Georgia, and Cassie.
