= Wilder (TV series) =

Swiss crime drama series

- Genre: Crime drama, thriller
- Created by: Béla Batthyany and Alexander Szombath
- Directed by: Pierre Monnard; Jan-Eric Mack; Claudio Fäh; Mauro Mueller
- Starring: Sarah Spale; Marcus Signer; Andreas Matti; Jonathan Loosli; Peter Hottinger; Ruth Schwegler; Pierre Siegenthaler; Anna Schinz
- Country of origin: Switzerland
- Original languages: German; French; English; Arabic
- No. of seasons: 4
- No. of episodes: 24

Production
- Running time: 57
- Production companies: C-Films, Panimage GmbH

Original release
- Network: SRF 1
- Release: 7 November 2017 – 8 February 2022

Wilder is a Swiss television crime drama and thriller series, which was broadcast from 7 November 2017. It spans four seasons of six episodes each. It was created by Béla Batthyany and Alexander Szombath and directed by Pierre Monnard (2017, 2020), Jan-Eric Mack (2020–2021), Claudio Fäh and Mauro Mueller (both 2022). The two lead protagonists are Rosa Wilder, who is portrayed by Sarah Spale, as a Bern-based cantonal police detective and Manfred Kägi (Marcus Signer), a federal police investigator.

== Premise ==
In November 2017 Rosa travels to her home town of Oberweis to attend the 30th annual memorial for an avalanche, which killed 12 primary school children including her brother. A visiting Egyptian investor, Karim meets local community leaders at Martin's hotel. Among the community are mayor Robert, his son Daniel and hotelier Martin. Karim's daughter Amina has had a clandestine relationship with former resident and renowned artist Armon. Manfred suspects Amina's bodyguard Rashad is a terrorist. Rosa discovers Armon's corpse, meanwhile Amina has gone missing.

Initially police suspect a kidnap plot. Manfred, who believes Rashad's responsible and investigates his previous life. When Rashad is identified, they fight over Manfred's gun: Rashad is killed. Rosa finds a seriously injured Amina in a hut. Federal prosecutor Barbara determines that Rashad murdered Armon out of jealousy. Manfred and Rosa discover that Armon, Barbara and their associate David had set off an explosion, which caused the fatal avalanche. David was also killed in the blast. Armon and Barbara had been assisted by Rosa's father Paul. Armon was murdered to prevent him revealing the secret of the explosion. Rosa has a one-night-stand with Daniel.

About three years later, Rosa has returned from America after her profiler training. She has a baby, Tim. Rosa attends a triple murder near Thallingen. She is assisted by local police, Susann and Leo. Their main witness, Simon, is Manfred's nephew. Initially police suspect a drug-related crime, as one victim, Faton carried methamphetamine. Rosa liaises with French narcotics' policeman, Jamel. Another victim, Artan, had recently had sex. Voluntary DNA tests are conducted on male attendees at a party where all three victims had been earlier. Simon was locked in Faton's car boot during the murders. Manfred assists his sister Laura and Simon. Simon hides the fact that he took Faton's €200,000 drug money. Artan's sister Adelina is Simon's girlfriend. Simon and Adelina run off to France, with both gang members and police trailing them. Drug lord, Antoine catches Adelina and Simon, but he is caught by Manfred, Jamel and Rosa.

The third victim, Corinne had been a thief: stealing jewellery from clients. Manfred investigates a historical serial rapist, Lenny, who had attacked Laura about 20 years ago. Leo is revealed as Artan's lover. Leo tampered with DNA evidence to hide his relationship. Lenny had also raped Jeanette: Susann and Georg's daughter. Jeanette later committed suicide. Ten years ago, Lenny's mother revealed her suspicions about Lenny to Susann. Georg and Susann caught Lenny and imprisoned him in an underground cell in their barn. Recently, Corinne had seen Georg with Lenny and ran off. Georg caught up with Corinne, but was stopped from arguing by Faton. Fearing revelation, Georg killed Corinne, Faton and Artan. Susann releases Lenny. Rosa arrests Susann, Manfred considers murdering Lenny but Rosa talks him down.

Another year later, Rosa and Manfred investigate a serial killer, who targets corrupt police. The first victim, Ronny had threatened a suspect's brother, Soufjan by holding him over a balcony. When Soufjan falls to his death, police cover-up and determine he died accidentally. The second victim, Gerry had beaten a drug-dealer Reto to death, but framed it as a lethal fight between junkies. Each victim has UV writing alluding to the Latin version of "but who will guard the guardians?" Prison guard, Patrizia, who ignored the frigid conditions of inmate, Lola, becomes the third victim. Rosa and Manfred use IT expert Jakob to trawl the darkweb leading to disgruntled former police commander, Christian. He supplied the files of the three victims to an anonymous man (later revealed as Martin). Public prosecutor Michael is Rosa's lover and wants her to move in together.

Martin now pursues three policemen. Ten years ago, their car caused his car to plummet down a mountain side. Martin's wife and daughter died when it caught on fire. Martin was thrown clear. The policemen were Lukas, Hanpi and Michael. Lukas and Michael arranged to investigate the collision and gaslit Martin into believing that he was responsible, with no other car was involved. After Martin kills Hanpi, Lukas wants to confess to authorities. However, Michael kills Lukas and foists the blame onto the serial killer. Martin captures Michael and forces him to confess on camera. Rosa and Manfred track down Martin to his farm and inform Michael. While searching the farm, Michael runs after Martin and shoots him, dead. He removes and destroys the camera's memory card. Lukas' wife Sabine sees Michael on TV, she recalls he was Lukas' friend years ago. Sabine finds a photo of all three policemen. Sabine informs Manfred of the connection. Manfred tracks Michael and Rosa, where Michael had confessed to Rosa about killing Lukas. Manfred arrests Michael.

Another year later, Rosa has retired and returned to live in Oberweis with Tim. She has reconciled with Paul, who has undergone chemotherapy for his cancer. Local policeman, Betsch, has been discovered dead in his overturned car. However, his head wound indicates that he was killed before the car was pushed down an incline. Res had already retired, and the lone policewoman Birgit asks for Rosa's assistance until an investigator can be sent from Bern. Manfred takes over the case and looks for links to a corrupt business cartel headed by Robert and the death of the gravel yard's owner, Koni. Robert and Daniel are robbed by a criminal, Rainer, who has been blackmailing Robert's accountant Kurt to recover Kurt's gambling debts. Rosa rescinds her retirement to help Manfred and Birgit.

Robert's cartel made huge profits from the building of a nearby reservoir. Koni's sister Nora suspects Robert of Koni's murder and provides accusations to Manfred. Rainer steals secret documents, which detail the cartel's activities. Nora separates from her husband Thomas, whom she suspects of assisting Robert. Overcome with guilt, Thomas suicides during the reservoir's inauguration. Daniel outwits Rainer and cheaply recovers the stolen documents. Rainer then kidnaps Tim and Paul in order to be paid a ransom. With police closing in, Rainer runs off but is thwarted by Daniel and Kurt. Kurt and Rainer struggle over his gun, which kills Rainer. Thomas' suicide letter provides further accusations against Robert. Manfred begins to search Robert's business property, but his warrant is rescinded through political pressure.

Betsch's wife, Isabelle had killed him after he denigrated her brother Elias and bragged to impregnating Julie, his mistress. Years earlier, Elias and Isabelle's mother Charlotte had killed their baby with the cooperation of Res. Charlotte and Res lied that the baby was put up for adoption. Upon being rebuffed by Isabelle and threatened with being sent into a care centre, Elias kills himself by dropping in front of a bus driven by Charlotte.

== Cast and characters ==
- Sarah Spale as Rosa Wilder: Bern-based cantonal police detective, Paul and Christine's daughter, Markus' younger sister. Armon's former lover: she became pregnant at 15 but had an abortion. Has an affair with Daniel. Tim's mother. Later, dates Michael. Returns to Oberweis to support Paul through his cancer treatment
- Marcus Signer as Manfred Kägi: federal police investigator, Laura's brother, Simon's uncle
- Andreas Matti as Paul Wilder: goat farmer, Christine's husband, Markus and Rosa's father. Develops terminal cancer, he dies in 2022.
- Jonathan Loosli as Daniel Räber: local businessman, Robert's son, Nicole's husband, has an affair with Rosa, works for Robert. Divorced by Nicole. Timmi's father.
- László I. Kish as Robert Räber: town mayor, prominent businessman, Daniel's father
- Peter Hottinger as Mattias Gruber: forensic pathologist
- Ruth Schwegler as Christine Wilder: Paul's wife, Markus and Rosa's mother, had an affair with Urs. Later lives with Rosa.
- Pierre Siegenthaler as Res Bühler: town police sergeant. Later, retired.
- Anna Schinz as Jenny Langenegger: Oberland TV camera operator. Becomes The Reporter's criminal journalist
- Julian Koechlin as Jakob Siegenthaler: kitchen assistant, amateur photographer, Denise's son via an affair with Robert. Becomes IT for Bern criminal police
- Daniel Ludwig (actor) as Peter Schwaller/Chef Fedpol: federal police senior officer, Manfred's boss
- Silas & Noah Meier as Timmi Wilder: Rosa's 2.5 year-old son. Later, 4 year-old shared custody with Dan

=== Season one only ===
- Amira El Sayed as Amina Al-Baroudi: investor's daughter, Armon's lover, art history graduate
- Uygar Tamer as Aisha Al-Baroudi: Karim's wife, Amina's mother
- Rebecca Indermaur as Denise Siegenthaler: Jakob's mother, Bruno's wife
- Vilmar Bieri as Bruno Siegenthaler: Town priest, Denise's husband, raised Jakob as his son
- Emmanuelle Reymond as Sophie Rindlisbacher: hotelier, Martin's wife
- Philippe Graber as Martin Rindlisbacher: hotelier, Sophie's husband
- Ernst C. Sigrist as Urs Glutz: mechanic, petrol station owner, had an affair with Christine
- Manfred Liechti as Franz Ramser: bar owner, Urs' friend, owns cabin, conspiracy theorist. Jakob and Prakesh's boss
- Samir Fuchs as Rashad Rahmani a.k.a. Abou Kallil: Amina's bodyguard. Identified as Jordanian terrorist Abou but dies in struggle with Manfred
- Kay Kysela as Prakash Kumarasami: chef, Jakob's mentor
- Anina Mutter as Sara Berisha
- Adrian Fähndrich as Roland "Roli" Huber: town police constable
- Sabina Schneebeli as Barbara Rossi: Bern-based Federal Public Prosecutor, former Oberweis resident, Rosa's godmother
- Ercan Durmaz as Kaphiri "Karim" Al-Baroudi: Egyptian investor, Amina's father, Aisha's husband. Planned to build a resort
- Nina Mariel Kohler as Nicole Räber: Daniel's wife
- Emanuela von Frankenberg as Béatrice Räber: Robert's wife, Daniel's mother, former school teacher, survived avalanche but developed severe mental problems. Dies in 2019.
- Thomas Douglas as Chefarzt: doctor
- Margot Gödrös as Silvia Kägi: Manfred's mother. Later aged care resident

=== Season two only ===
- Manuela Biedermann as Susann Walter: Thallingen police chief, Georg's wife, Jeanette's mother
- Caspar Kaeser as Leo Mott: policeman, Helene's husband, Artan's cladestine lover
- Gilles Marti as Simon Kägi: Manfred's 18-year-old nephew, Adelina's boyfriend, works at sawmill
- Sylvie Marinkovic as Adelina Kabashi: Enver and Jeta's 17-year-old daughter, Simon's girlfriend
- Ueli Jäggi as Charles Mulliger: sawmill owner, Frank and Helene's father, Alfons' son
- Pascal Ulli as Frank Mulliger: sawmill foreman, Charles' son
- Elda Sorra as Jeta Kabashi: restaurateur, Enver's wife, Artan, Adelina and Betim's mother
- Edon Rizvanolli as Enver Kabashi: restaurateur, Jeta's husband, Artan, Adelina and Betim's father
- Nikola Weisse as Sophie Barth: former maid for Mulligers, Charles' friend, one of Corinne's clients
- Stéphane Maeder as Georg Walter: stable owner, Susann's husband, Jeanette's father
- Aljoscha Mösli as Betim Kabashi: Enver and Jeta's son, works at Georg's stable
- Doro Müggler as Laura Kägi: Manfred's sister, Simon's mother, former drug addict
- Christoph Gaugler as Rolf Steiger: innkeeper, Corinne's father
- Olivia Lina Gasche as Corinne Steiger: community care nurse, Rolf's daughter, murdered
- Mark Harvey Mühlemann as Artan Kabashi: Enver and Jeta's older son, Leo's clandestine lover, murdered
- Anna-Katharina Müller as Helene Mott Mulliger: sawmill accountant, Frank's sister, Leo's wife
- Pero Radicic as Hugo "Porto" Portman: drug pusher, Faton's boss, murdered
- Dani Mangisch as Edi: sawmill worker
- Peter Zumstein as Toni Amberg né Oliver Hartmann: waiter, works for Rolf
- Raphael Roger Levy as Jamel Jaoui: Lyon-based French narcotics policeman, assists Rosa
- Dardan Sadik as Faton Berisha: drug courier, works for Porto, murdered
- Vincent Aubert as Antoine Korday: drug lord, Porto's boss
- Daniel Frei as Lenny Schürch: Max' son, serial rapist

=== Season three only ===
- Andreas Grötzinger as Michael Mettler: Bern head prosecutor, works with Rosa: they are dating
- Michael Neuenschwander as Martin Jesch (né Lauener) a.k.a. Mr Jaeggi or Jean Dumont: egg delivery driver, farmer; hallucinates that his wife and daughter still live with him
- Roland Bonjour as Lukas Zimmermann: Nottingen policeman, Max' brother, Sabine's husband, Fabienne's father
- Roger Bonjour as Max Zimmermann: policeman, Lukas' brother, unmarried
- Annina Butterworth as Ruth Bolliger: farmer, supplies eggs to Martin
- Sarah Hostettler as Sabine Zimmermann: Lukas' wife, Fabienne's mother
- Cheyenne Tanner as Aline Jesch: Martin and Teresa's daughter
- Jorik Wenger as Jonas: Michael's son, ice hockey player
- Lucy Wirth as Teresa Jesch: Martin's wife, Aline's mother
- Luna Paiano as Fabienne Zimmermann: Lukas' daughter
- Sebastian Krähenbühl as Hans-Peter "Hanpi" Koller: former policeman, driving instructor
- Hanspeter Müller-Drossaart as Gerry Engler: Elisabeth's husband, Marie's father, policeman, works in IT alongside Jakob
- Lena Lessing as Carla Henze: The Reporter editor, Jenny's boss
- Martin Klaus as Fabian Rösch: policeman, Ronny's colleague. Becomes Nouria's boyfriend
- Nastassja Tanner as Nouria Hamid: Farouk and Soufjan's sister, hairdresser, Fabian's girlfriend
- Urs Bosshardt as Bruno Spadin: The Reporter's legal advisor
- Stefan Merki as Christian Aeby: former police commander, dismissed for sexual harassment
- Lilian Naef as Elisabeth Engler: Gerry's wife, Marie's mother
- Andreas Krämer as Attila Benko: gym owner
- Nabil Rafi as Farouk Hamid: criminal, his brother Soufjan died during police raid
- Jasmin Mattei as Patricia Schellenberg: prison guard, allowed prisoner to die of hypothermia

=== Season four only ===
- Nicolas Rosat as Kurt Liechti: Robert's accountant
- Linus Müller (actor) as Tim Wilder: Rosa and Daniel's son; primary school age
- Barbara Grimm Charlotte Tanner: bus driver, Elias and Isabelle's mother
- Lukas Walcher Elias Tanner: Charlotte's son, farmhand
- Sebastian Rudolph as Rainer Strunz: nightclub owner, local criminal
- Annina Euling as Isabelle Betschart: Betsch's wife, Res' niece, Tim's teacher
- Sabine Timoteo as Nora Zingg (née Lehmann): Thomas' separated wife, Koni's sister
- Morgane Ferru as Julie Kuster: Sonne hotel's owner, Daniel's lover
- Klaus Brömmelmeier as Thomas Zingg: Nora's separated husband, gravel plant operator
- Fred Benndorff as Manuel Zingg: Nora and Thomas' son, apprentice IT at Räbers
- Dimitri Stapfer as Urs "Betsch" Betschart: local policeman
- Monika Varga as Birgit Schmid: local policewoman
- Philippe Schuler as Koni Lehmann: Nora's brother, Thomas' partner at gravel yard, died three years ago
- Regula Grauwiller as Greta Hollenstein: councillor, curated dam project

== Production ==
Wilder was created by Béla Batthyany and Alexander Szombath and directed by Pierre Monnard (2017, 2020), Jan-Eric Mack (2020–2021), Claudio Fäh and Mauro Mueller (both 2022). The first season of six episodes was followed by three further seasons of the same length in 2020, 2021 and 2022. The first season's concepts had been developed in 2013 for SRF and scripts were written within two years. Most of its filming occurred in Urnerboden and Glarus from November 2016 to March 2017.

The second season is set about three years later in the fictitious town of Thallingen near Vendlincourt, Jura. Filming took place from September to December 2018 in Jura, including in Vendlincourt and in the city of Biel.

All four seasons were available on Play Suisse and on Netflix as Buried Truth from January 2024.

== Episode guide ==
=== Season one ===
No. overall	No. in season	Title	Directed by	Written by	Original release date
1	1	"Bone" (Knochen)	Pierre Monnard	Andreas Stadler, Béla Batthyany	7 November 2017
Amina runs through forest to road; she waves at approaching car. 12 hours earlier: Shinbone, dropped by bird onto Rosa's car, delivered to police station. Flashback: Béatrice driving school bus; stops at roadblock. She begins removing blockade; avalanche crashes into bus. Present: Daniel relates Béatrice's trauma; Rosa recalls Markus. Bruno leads prayers for dead children. Rosa greets Armon, who arranges to meet later. Armon's cabin has pirate portrait. Rosa views her old ultrascan. Welcoming party greet Karim. Robert meets Barbara. Martin takes Karim to hotel. Manfred to Barbara: will find proof of Rashad's terrorism. Amina leaves scarf in Urs' toilet. Armon's memorial artwork has 13 fountains. Manfred copies Rashad's laptop. Paul protests against resort project. Manfred removes Paul; Barbara drives Paul home. Nicole to Robert: Béatrice's missing. Manfred to associate: decrypt Rashad's files. Jakob films Amina arguing with Rashad. Armon sketches flowers for Rosa. Jakob films Jenny. Jakob follows Amina from hotel. Rosa discovers Armon's corpse. Amina's missing. Rosa prevents Rashad from entering cabin. Murder weapon has black fibres, matching Amina's gloves. Res: Armon had cancer. Barbara informs Karim: police seek Amina. Barbara appoints Manfred to lead investigation. Rosa directs search for Amina. Urs burns effigy, scrawls graffiti against resort.
2	2	"Key" (Schlüssel)	Pierre Monnard	Andreas Stadler, Béla Batthyany	14 November 2017
Amina's gloves are burnt. Res and Barbara let Rosa lead local investigation of Armon's murder. Jenny films video news report. Aisha arrives at hotel. Rashad to Manfred: Amina's location unknown. Aisha blames Karim's lax parenting for Amina's wilful ways. Urs holds Amina's scarf. Rashad's alibi confirmed. Barbara meets local police team. Manfred and Rosa query Paul. Christine confirms Paul was home all night. Jakob reviews his videos of Amina. Jakob arrives late for work. Denise and Bruno discuss Jakob's work ethic. Nicole searches for Béatrice, who wanders outside. Rosa notes Christine's abrasiveness; Paul tries to pacify Rosa. Rosa checks Urs' store for spray cans to match graffiti. Urs runs off, but Rashad grapples him. Urs admits to graffiti but not Amina's kidnapping. Res finds an anomalous key in Urs' store. Res: shinbone belonged to 20 to 30-year-old male, who died about 30 years ago. Karim and Rashad demand police find Amina. Robert finds Béatrice, returns her home. Rosa stops Manfred's violent questioning of Urs. Manfred and Rosa use key to enter Urs' cabin; Amina's not there. Urs kept files on avalanche: locals blamed Neratom's test drilling. Rosa determines Christine and Urs had affair. Jakob deletes Amina and Armon argument video.
3	3	"Gorge" (Schlucht)	Pierre Monnard	Andreas Stadler, Béla Batthyany	21 November 2017
Béatrice looks inside hut. Rashad's decrypted files detail Amina and Armon's affair. Rosa disparages Christine's affair with Urs; who is not kidnapper. Rashad promises Karim to find Amina; Karim departs. Franz' dissatisfied with Jakob's poor work. Rosa asks Jakob for party footage. Res and Rosa view Amina and Rashad's argument; Rashad forbids Amina from seeing Armon. Manfred explains Rashad's terrorist links. Rashad denies hiring Mohammed as photographer. Manfred to Rosa: Rashad's group killed engineers in Lebanon. Christine tells Paul: finished with Urs. Rosa and Manfred follow Rashad, who fights Mohammed. Manfred cuffs Mohammed, Rashad runs away. Rosa stops Rashad. Mohammed: took photos for sale to Egyptian press. Karim learns of Rashad's arrest. Rashad: Mohammed blackmailed family over Amina's affair. Rosa visits Räbers for dinner. Manfred to Barbara: Mohammed not kidnapper. Jakob and Prakash provide Jenny with accommodation. Manfred accuses Rashad of terrorism, which he denies. Martin works on hotel's car. Rosa finds Amina's diary in Rashad's room. Rashad released on bail. When confronted with his identity as Abou, Rashad runs off. Manfred and Rashad struggle over Manfred's gun, which kills Rashad. Rosa follows Béatrice into forest. Robert gives new camera to Jakob. Béatrice leads Rosa to hut: Amina's inside.
4	4	"Trace" (Spur)	Pierre Monnard	Andreas Stadler, Béla Batthyany	28 November 2017
Amina's hospitalised with serious injuries and hypothermia. Flashback: Martin's distracted answering mobile; car hits Amina. Present: Rosa to Barbara: Manfred was focussed on Abou, but took no inappropriate action. Jakob and Jenny have sex. Manfred suspended pending shooting investigation. Martin confesses to Sophie why he's fixing car. Martin hid Amina's condition to protect project. Manfred translates Amina's mumbling: “someone's following me”. Amina sketched "pirate" from Armon's picture. Rosa believes Amina ran from Armon's killer, into forest and arrived at roadway. Sophie advises Martin not to confess. Rosa finds evidence of car collision. Rosa, Res and Manfred inform Barbara of car's involvement. Nicole urges Daniel to convince Robert of Béatrice's residential care. Rosa's parents do not recognise "pirate". When teenager, Rosa's parents coerced her to abort foetus. Paul punches Urs. Denise stops Bruno beating Jakob. Denise returns Robert's camera. Sophie swaps number plates between hotel's cars. Manfred: Martin ordered new car parts. Martin to Rosa: Rashad returned damaged car. Nicole finds evidence of Franz and Robert's covering up avalanche payouts. Martin confesses to car accident. Barbara resolves case: Rashad blamed for Armon's death; Amina uncharged, Martin hit deer. Karim continues resort project. Nicole sees Daniel and Rosa having sex.
5	5	"Pirate" (Pirat)	Pierre Monnard	Andreas Stadler, Béla Batthyany	5 December 2017
Flashback: Amina sees Armon's drawings of Rosa. Outside, Jakob films Armon breaking up with Amina. Later, someone knocks; Amina hides in back room. Present: Robert's files show Franz withdrew protests about Neratom after Robert's payout. Res investigates Robert. Prakash's cousin Rohan saw Rashad in Bern, when Rashad allegedly killed Armon. Rosa hypothesises: Neratom caused avalanche. Franz refuses to answer Rosa. Robert to Rosa and Res: local businesses supported Franz to prevent town's bad publicity. Res closes Rosa's investigation. Amina's phone contains Robert's photo. Robert deduces Nicole leaked files. Res arrests Robert for Armon's murder. Robert: Jakob used Amina's mobile for photo. Jakob and Jenny have Rohan confirm Rashad's alibi. Manfred needs court order to search Neratom's offices. Nicole leaves Daniel. Sifting through Franz' files Manfred finds photo of "pirate". Inside Armon's picture: "pirate"'s glass eye, which Manfred researches. Jenny gives USB to Rosa. Police diver recovers Amina's mobile. Res accuses Robert of bribing Jakob. Glass eye belonged to anarchist, David Sutter. Jakob: followed Amina to return phone but lost her in forest. Jakob encountered Robert near weir. Denise: Robert is Jakob's father. Res releases Robert; police imprison Jakob. Old protest photo shows David, Armon and Barbara.
6	6	"Abyss" (Abgrund)	Pierre Monnard	Andreas Stadler, Béla Batthyany	12 December 2017
Flashback: Young Armon, Barbara, David prepare explosives on mountainside. David falls; leg trapped between rocks. Béatrice stops bus at roadblock. Others, who set off explosion, cannot hear David. Béatrice yells as avalanche approaches. Present: Rosa and Manfred ask Barbara for search warrant for David's aunt's place. Barbara loads gun. Rosa throws away her foetus' ultrascan. Manfred coaches Silvia to imitate David's aunt. Barbara arrives, but does not enter. Rosa confronts Barbara in evidence room. Barbara leaves. Rosa follows Barbara upstairs to roof. Barbara: blast was to stop Neratom; accidentally killed children. She admits to killing Armon before dropping to her death. Manfred finalises case. Rosa arranges Jakob's release. Paul phones Barbara's mobile, but Manfred answers. Amina regains consciousness. Denise's been bashed; Jakob threatens Bruno. Amina to Manfred: Armon killed by woman. Rosa tells her parents about blast plot. Manfred to Baroudis: Abou and Amina innocent of killing Armon. At church, Rosa describes blast plot to community. Barbara's mobile called Wilders' farm. Rosa finds Armon's drawing in Paul's bin. Paul and Christine to sell farm. Amina recognises Paul's voice. Paul to Rosa: supplied explosives storeroom key. Flashback: Paul struck Armon. Barbara used Armina's gloves on hammer's handle. Manfred arrests Paul.

=== Season two ===
No. overall	No. in season	Title	Directed by	Written by	Original release date
7	1	"Blood" (Blut)	Pierre Monnard, Jan-Eric Mack	Béla Batthyany	7 January 2020
Simon pops car boot, runs off. Rosa leaves Timmi with Christine. Laura discovers frightened Simon. Rosa drives through Thallingen to crime scene. Susann identifies corpses: Artan, Faton and Corinne. Car had drugs. Corinne wore distinctive mask pendant. Susann: no known connection between victims. When Rolf arrives, Leo takes him home. Susann informs Kabashis of Artan's death. Adelina: Artan and Faton were friends. Leo trashes SIM card. Enver displays threatening letter. Rosa and Susann interview Manfred, Simon and Laura. Flashback: Simon kissing Adelina. Later, he meets Artan and Faton, who put Simon in boot. He hears about five shots. Simon escaped an hour later, saw corpses, ran home. Present: Simon was frightened to immediately report to police. He heard strange beeping after shots. Rosa to Manfred: stay out of investigation. Christine collects Paul from prison. Betim helps at horse stable. Rosa meets Frank and Charles. Victims had attended Charles' party, who provides guest list. Police search Corinne's home. Susann describes Corinne: social butterfly, home care nurse. Faton's wife: does not know Simon; nor drugs. Porto: €200,000 not found. Wife to Porto: police asked about Simon. Rosa refuses to visit Paul. Porto stalks Adelina. Manfred to Rosa: keep me informed. Simon stole loot.
8	2	"Parasites" (Zecke)	Pierre Monnard, Jan-Eric Mack	Béla Batthyany, Alexander Seibt	14 January 2020
Porto to Antoine: tracking suspected thief; drug deliveries continuing. Antoine: Jamel's after you. Rosa meets Jamel. Mattias: victims killed by gun, but not one found at scene. Artan had sperm in rectum. Kabashis hold Artan's vigil. Jamel: Faton's member of Antoine's syndicate. Simon hides loot. Porto, pretending to be Artan's football buddy, meets Adelina. Rolf denies sending threatening letter. Leo asks Enver: who's Artan's lover? Envar denies Artan was gay. Drugmakers scramble to clean up meth lab. Rosa and Jamel arrive. Jamel hides in drugmaker's truck. Truck arrives at warehouse. Jamel disables first drugmaker, then fights second. Rosa saves Jamel. Manfred gives Laura €2000. Porto follows Adelina to Simon. Susann: Corinne was Jeanette's friend. Police interview Sophie: Corinne prepared her hair. Charles takes Sophie's diaries; Corinne unearthed their secret. Drugmaker to Jamel: Porto gave drugs to Faton to deliver to France. Simon buys motorbike. Enver slaps Adelina for not wearing headscarf. Georg sends Betim home. Adelina leaves home. Jamel: Porto's looking for missing money. Rosa's frosty to Paul. Adelina visits Simon. Porto learns drugmakers were arrested. He follows Simon and Adelina. Porto discovers Simon's gone with loot. Antoine's henchman Viktor kills Porto. Simon leaves cash for Laura. Simon and Adelina head for France.
9	3	"Lies" (Lüge)	Pierre Monnard, Jan-Eric Mack	Andreas Stadler, Béla Batthyany	21 January 2020
Flashback: Leo and Artan have sex. Present: police analysis: Porto killed by single headshot. Police post alert for Simon. Laura hands Simon's money to Rosa; Simon's location unknown. He's spotted near border. Manfred joins Rosa and Jamel. Frank wants sawmill to make wood pellets. Charles reads Sophie's diaries. Jeta and Enver argue about driving Adelina away. Georg and Betim care for ill horse. Publican notices Simon and Adelina's wanted photos. Susann deduces Artan and lover attended Charles' party. Adelina leaves upon discovering Simon's loot. Adelina abducted by Antoine, who phones Simon. During police search, Leo collects Artan's camera. Simon meets Antoine holding Adelina. Tracking Adelina's phone, police approach. Viktor places gun to Simon's head: money left with motorbike. Rosa and Jamel try stopping them, but lower weapons when hostages threatened. Manfred jumps onto Antoine; Rosa disarms Viktor. Simon admits stealing money but denies killings. Rosa suggests DNA testing males party attendees. Charles rejects Frank's pellets proposal. Laura visits Simon. Leo tells Charles about Artan's homosexuality. Manfred sees Rosa's case board, pendant photo. He recalls related rape cases. Rosa dines with parents; Daniel arrives. Rosa and Jamel have sex. Flashback: Leo threatens Artan when he suggests revealing relationship.
10	4	"Fire" (Brand)	Pierre Monnard, Jan-Eric Mack	Béla Batthyany	28 January 2020
Flashback: Laura chased until caught, rapist wears mask pendant. Present: Simon's imprisoned. Rosa drives Adelina to Kabashis. Laura refuses Manfred's questions about pendant. Police start DNA tests. Frank reveals Artan's homosexuality. Martin, Rolf and mob travel to Kabashis. Rosa takes Leo's sample. Adelina calls Rosa for help: lynch mob coming. Charles arrives, disciplines Martin, disperses mob as police respond. Leo stops truck driver, takes DNA test. Georg and Betim kill dying horse. Leo swaps DNA samples. Leo to Helene: no affair with Artan. Laura's rapist is Simon's father. Timmi scalded under Paul's supervision. Rosa ejects Paul. Rosa to Manfred: Daniel's Timmi's father. Flashback: accused murderer Schürch hunted to cliff edge. Present: Sophie wakes. Simon released on bail. Manfred reviews serial rapist's files. DNA tests negative. Manfred asks Susann about Jeanette's rape case. Rosa and Susann called to motel by witness, who recognised Artan. Jeanette jumped off cliff. Leo celebrates Helene's birthday party. Rosa and Susann review motel's CCTV: Artan with Leo. As Helene answers door to police, Leo runs off. Rosa chases Leo to cliff, who admits loving Artan. Leo arrested for evidence tampering. Rosa meets Georg. Christine: Timmi's in pain; bandages changed. Someone smashes car's windows; sets it alight.
11	5	"Cursed" (Fluch)	Pierre Monnard, Jan-Eric Mack	Béla Batthyany	4 February 2020
Sophie's nightmare: Schürch grabs her. Rolf claims: arsonist wore white trainers, ran towards river. Manfred suspects Toni of being rapist. Betim denies burning Rolf's car. Sophie reads newspaper: Charles' father Alfons allegedly murdered by Schürch. Schürch died falling off cliff. Rosa and Manfred approach Toni, who runs off. Manfred catches Toni. Leo has alibi for murders. He's charged with abuse of authority; fired from police. Toni assaulted Edina but not others; Corinne argued with Charles. Manfred searches Corinne's jewellery box. Charles to Rosa: Corinna heard of sawmill sackings. Corinne had robbed her clients. Charles denies Schürch's death related to Corinne. Both Leo and Helene cheated on each other; Leo leaves. Sophie recalls: repeatedly raped by Alfons. Charles shot Alfons dead. Sophie blamed Schürch. Corinne read Sophie's diaries; blackmailed Charles. Rosa accuses Charles of murdering Corinne. Sophie dies in her sleep. Helene and Martin argue about Charles. Rolf refuses to sign witness statement. Simon discovers Manfred's file on rapist. While interviewing Corinne's client, Manfred notices photo: Lenny drove taxis. Manfred discovers files scattered; Simon's missing. Martin wrecks Charles' office. Rolf admits to burning his own car. Simon returns to Laura. Paul and Christine argue. Simon hears Martin's car beeping.
12	6	"Revenge" (Fluch)	Pierre Monnard, Jan-Eric Mack	Béla Batthyany	11 February 2020
Ten years earlier: Lenny forced into forest at gunpoint; shot fired. Present: Police arrest Martin for murder. Adelina refuses to leave with family. Martin claims: at party during murders. Simon remembers car beeping at murder scene. Manfred asks Susann to check similar cars. Susann looks for Georg. Enver sees Artan's photos of Leo. Rosa and Manfred arrive at Walters' home. George admits to killing Lenny, Artan, Faton and Corinne. Kabashis return to Adelina. Flashback: Corinne cycles away from Georg. He catches up, tries pacifying her. Faton's car arrives, who orders Georg to release Corinne. George kills all three. Susann claims: never knew Georg found Lenny or about triple murders. Lenny's mother provided information. Charles and Martin argue over Alfons' murder, Sophie's death. Susann goes home. Manfred informs Lenny's mother of death. Paul advises Rosa: tell Daniel. Susann feeds Lenny in underground cell. Rosa and Manfred visit Susann. Manfred noticed Susann cooked for two. Rosa and Manfred suspect Susann imprisoned Lenny; find Susann in barn's cellar. Flashback: Corinne finds Georg feeding Lenny. Present: Susann let Lenny go. Susann's took poison, dies. Manfred catches Lenny; points gun at him. Rosa talks Manfred down; Lenny's arrested. Rosa tells Daniel: he's Timmi's father.

=== Season three ===
No. overall	No. in season	Title	Directed by	Written by	Original release date
13	1	"Jesch" (Jesch)	Jan-Eric Mack	Béla Batthyany	5 January 2021
Armed police, seeking Farouk, force entry into apartment. Ronny holds Farouk's brother Soufjan over balcony; Soufjan falls to his death. Four years later: Rosa practices shooting. Manfred attends Ronny's corpse: killed in fall. Mattias: Ronny was tied, bruised before death. Manfred unlocks Ronny's mobile. Police discover Farouk at Attila's gym; Farouk assaults Manfred, escapes. Jenny receives USB. Attila: do not know Ronny. Police suspect Farouk's revenge on Ronny; Michael issues arrest warrant. USB video: Ronny admits killing Soufjan. Jenny: must publish video. Carla: consult legal department. Rosa interviews Fabian, who confirms Soufjan's accidental death. Farouk asks Nouria for money. Nouria: no idea where Farouk went. Martin eats in police canteen; delivers eggs to Zimmermanns' station. Police squad view Ronny's confession. Police interview Jenny and Carla; request building's CCTV. Rosa and Michael watch Jonas' team. Attila finds Farouk breaking into locker. Rosa and Manfred see that Nouria and Fabian are dating. Farouk: did not kill Ronny. Farouk sees Fabian's uniform. Martin collects eggs from Ruth, who kisses him. Farouk exposes Fabian's identity. Police prevent Farouk assaulting Fabian. Fabian lied to protect reputation. Dan collects Timmi from Rosa and Michael. Martin wears gloves; loads drug into syringe; follows Gerry.
14	2	"Wound" (Wunde)	Jan-Eric Mack	Béla Batthyany, Alexander Seibt	12 January 2021
Flashback: Gerry beats suspect with iron. Present: Woman discovers Gerry's corpse. Martin stopped by Lukas: Martin's taillight's broken. Police attend corpse. Mattias: cranial trauma; woman saw van with broken taillight. Nouria forgives Fabian. Jenny receives another USB. Martin cleans bloodied iron; talks to Teresa. USB video: Gerry admits to killing suspect. Bruno advises against broadcasting. Jenny: police are covering up; perpetrator will upload video. Mattias: Gerry drugged with thiopental, same as Ronny. Jakob: second video downloaded. Max notified about killer. Peter: killer targeting police; federal case now. Martin has meal with his family. Ruth visits. Max and Fabienne are cheating on Lukas. Hanpi to Lukas: concerned by police killer. Lukas: unrelated to us. Jakob describes junkie, Reto, who was murdered. Rosa castigates Jakob: unauthorised questioning Marie. Marie to Rosa: Gerry altered report; Reto charged with drug trafficking but not Marie. Flashback: Elisabeth and Gerry banish Reto. Gerry kills Reto. Present: Marie leaves, Elisabeth cries. Fabienne sees Max and Sabine having sex. Mattias: UV writing on corpses: sed quis from Latin phrase, "sed quis custodiet ipsos custodes?" Manfred: three more victims? Manfred searches for darknet's "White Wolf". Rosa and Michael discuss parenting styles. Martin records Patrizia's confession; douses her with cold water.
15	3	"Frost" (Frost)	Jan-Eric Mack	Béla Batthyany	19 January 2021
Flashback: Prisoner, Lola complains: too cold; Patrizia: turns off monitor. Lola dies. Present: Lukas and Max discuss murdered officers. Jakob trails "White Wolf" across darkweb. Michael: cannot contact Patrizia. Jakob accesses Patrizia's confession video posted by Jenny. Jenny questions Peter about higher-level corruption. Martin and Ruth stack eggs. Rosa: killer wants Patrizia to die of cold. Manfred: search cool rooms. Patrizia: tied up, lying on floor. Martin and Ruth dine. At home, Martin reminisces about Teresa and Aline. Patrizia's corpse discovered inside refrigerated truck; has custodiet on arm. Lukas, Sabine and Fabienne argue about secrets. Sabine confesses affair with Max. Police check former officers with grudge against colleagues. Jakob: identifies Christian as "White Wolf". Rosa: killer used Christian's files to target victims. Martin renews flowers at roadside memorial to Teresa and Aline. Carla suspends Jenny for publishing third video. Lukas confronts Max over betrayal. Rosa, Michael and Jonas dine. Michael offers to buy house to live together with Rosa and Timmi, but Jonas objects. Lukas cold shoulders Sabine. News reports: civil unrest due to police corruption. Hanpi supervises Martin's driving lesson. Martin tries to inject Hanpi, who fends him off. Martin chokes Hanpi, but runs off as witness approaches.
16	4	"Cellar" (Keller)	Jan-Eric Mack	Béla Batthyany	26 January 2021
Flashback: Martin driving Teresa and Aline; their car's forced off-road by oncoming car. Martin's thrown clear but car catches afire. He sees three men peering down from road. Present: Mattias: Hanpi's hospitalised, in coma, but dies. Lukas arranges meeting. Christian: approached online by unnamed man seeking examples of police brutality. Christian provided files on three victims; man claimed police caused traffic accident. Rosa releases Christian. Martin approaches Lukas, but he's thwarted by Fabienne's presence. Peter forbids Manfred re-investigating Lola's death. Rosa: investigate accidental deaths when Hanpi was policeman. Rosa and Manfred ask Jenny to create fake news: Hanpi's recovering. Lukas attempts reconciliation with Sabine. Rosa and team monitor hospital, hoping to lure killer. Jakob warns Jenny: leave hospital. Rosa checks laundry workers. Martin accesses ventilation system; sets off alarm. Jenny photographs emergency response. Martin poses as fireman, attacks police guard. Rosa chases him into car park, commandeers car but crashes into Jakob. Martin's injured, escapes. Manfred discovers where Martin held victims. Manfred's knocked out. Jakob's seriously injured. Lukas recalls driving car, causing two deaths. Ruth tends Martin's wound. Manfred wakes in cellar, strapped to wheelchair. Michael to Lukas: keep calm; will be okay. Lukas wants to confess. Michael kills Lukas.
17	5	"Process" (Prozess)	Jan-Eric Mack	Béla Batthyany	2 February 2021
Flashback: Lukas distracted on mobile, drives on wrong side, forces another car off-road, which catches afire. Present: Jakob has surgery. Peter to team: next victim; police attend Lukas' corpse. Mattias: second car's tracks, man's shoe prints. Martin drives by, asks Rosa about scene. Sabine recognises Hanpi. Rosa to Michael: Lukas and Hanpi were former police friends. Michael will provide Lukas' files. He hides his shoes; deletes his name from files. Rosa searches Manfred's laptop. Martin posing as talent scout, meets Jonas. Rosa informs Peter: Manfred's absent. Files describe Lukas and Hanpi investigated traffic collision. Mattias: not Lukas' shoe print. Rosa's squad seek Martin and Manfred. Martin taunts Michael: where's Jonas? At gunpoint, Martin records Michael describing collision and cover up. Michael admits to killing Lukas. Martin leaves Michael alive. Jonas asks Rosa for Michael, she puts him in Michael's office. Jakob to Rosa: videos filmed in slaughterhouse. Jonas attended ice hockey game with Martin's ticket. Armed police raid slaughterhouse: Manfred's gone. Martin releases Manfred in snowfield. Peter disbands Rosa's squad. Manfred's been found. Ruth looks for Martin; destroys his victim's files. Martin arrives home, still sees Teresa and Aline. Rosa finds chicken feather in slaughterhouse. Martin kisses Ruth.
18	6	"Blind" (Blind)	Jan-Eric Mack	Béla Batthyany	9 February 2021
Flashback: Martin describes three men peering down at burning car. Lukas and Michael adjust Martin's statement; cover up their involvement. Present: Martin and Ruth had sex. Rosa and Manfred suspect Martin. Michael: not enough evidence. Ruth knows about Martin's revenge. He promises to return. Max sorts through Lukas' diaries: recalls Martin's taillight. Ruth lies to Rosa: Martin quit, days ago. Martin views Michael's video. Max checks Martin. Police and Michael find Max knocked out. Michael trails Martin in snow. Rosa and Martin follow. Martin knocks Michael down. Martin distracted by hallucination. Michael shoots Martin, dead. Michael's injured, finds memory card. Max recovers. Michael leaves by ambulance. Jakob to Jenny: do not give up, now. Justice Department confirms Lola's case closure. denies Jenny's claim of systemic corruption; issues fully investigated. Manfred: who was Martin's major victim? Sabine displays photo to Max: Michael was Lukas' friend. Mattias: Martin not Lukas' killer. Max sees Rosa and Michael kissing. Michael takes Rosa into huge house. Max shows photo to Manfred. Manfred searches for Rosa and Michael. Rosa deduces Michael's involved in Lukas' death; Michael confesses. Manfred enters house; Rosa asks Michael to run, but he submits. Max arrests Michael. Rosa considers retirement.

=== Season four ===
No. overall	No. in season	Title	Directed by	Written by	Original release date
19	1	"Sow" (Sau)	Claudio Fäh, Mauro Mueller	Andreas Stadler, Béla Batthyany	4 January 2022
Thomas throws severed pig's head through police window. Res asks Rosa to assist Bergit with Betsch's corpse. He's in overturned police car with anomalous head wound. Prosecutor to Rosa: start investigation. Elias watches crime scene. Manfred appointed: leads investigation. Daniel discovers office trashed. Res and Rosa notify Isabelle. Betsch did not return last night. Robert: folder stolen folder; cartel meeting's minutes. Doctor describes Paul's chemotherapy. Birgit describes fight at Sonne's hotel. Julie: Thomas taunted Elias, who jostled Thomas. Paul defended Elias. Betsch took Thomas outside. Elias wades into frigid pool. Rosa visits Thomas' workplace; discovers bloodied coat. Birgit: sends police alert for Thomas. Robert, Daniel and Tim meet Greta atop dam project; pose for publicity shot. Nora: separated year ago, Thomas' became aggressive. Res takes Isabelle to Charlotte's. Mattias: head wound from blunt metal object; Betsch's blood on roadway. Rosa hands over investigation to Manfred. Manuel updates Thomas on police suspicions. Nora to Manfred: Räbers run corrupt business cartel; hounded Koni to death. Kurt meets Rainer, who has Robert's stolen moneybox. Kurt extracts cartel's documents. Rainer and Kurt to blackmail Robert; paying off Kurt's debts. Rosa finds metal star on roadway near crime scene. Elias wears Betsch's cap.
20	2	"Gravel" (Kies)	Claudio Fäh, Mauro Mueller	Andreas Stadler, Béla Batthyany	11 January 2022
Thomas' nightmare: someone dumps gravel atop him. Rainer phones Daniel: 300000 francs for documents. Rosa assists Manfred. Res: Betsch's cap in Elias' room. Mattias: star looks decorative. Birgit: Elias has aphasia from brain injury. Robert: will pay blackmailer. Charlotte: Elias' usually gentle. Rosa questions Elias, pushes her away, climbs to hayloft. Isabelle coaxes Elias down. Manfred asks Räbers and Kurt about Koni's death. Manfred follows Robert and Kurt to restaurant. Isabelle to Rosa: Elias often takes things. Daniel to reporter: Robert will handover company. Manfred photographs Robert and Kurt. Rainer recognises Manfred; leaves restaurant. Rainer drives off. Paul's cancer relapsed. Witnesses confirm Betsch wore cap at Sonne's. Thomas to police: admits throwing pig's head, fighting at Sonne's, but not killing Betsch. Rainer to Kurt: spotted detective. Thomas: Betsch threatened to send Elias to asylum. Thomas went home to prepare pig. Manfred to Rosa: signs of local price-fixing cartel. Rosa picks up Tim from Daniel. Kurt sees thugs beat Rainer; ask for money. Rainer refused to allow Kurt to quit arrangement. Charlotte and Paul dine together; his cancer's spreading. Daniel cuddles Julie; she's pregnant. Daniel's unsympathetic, she asks Daniel to leave. Paul finds Julie knocked off her motorcycle; phones for help.
21	3	"Shame" (Scham)	Claudio Fäh, Mauro Mueller	Andreas Stadler, Béla Batthyany	18 January 2022
Kurt dream: being discovered. Daniel apologises to Julie for poor attitude. Thomas released on bail. Manfred sends Res home. Rainer phones Daniel: bring 350,000 francs. Julie's shop requires renovation. Robert visits Béatrice's grave; confronts Res for tailing him. Thomas: home when Koni died. Elias has vacant stare: Charlotte increased his medication. Isabelle wants more independence for Elias. Robert pays Thomas to leave town. Daniel calls Rainer's bluff, receives documents for 8000, which includes USB drive. Flashback: Betsch learns Isabelle has damaged uterus by earlier birth. Isabelle will not reveal details. Betsch asks Charlotte. Current: Res: Isabelle became pregnant at 15 to classmate; baby was adopted. Daniel returns documents to Robert. Cartel meets: Thomas not attending. Robert reneges on announcing retirement. Birgit: gravel yard CCTV's been edited, portion replaced from another night. Rainer rails at Kurt for douments' poor price. Thomas places letter into envelope. Thomas to Manuel; feigns going to Thailand. Manuel remembers Thomas left home on night Koni died. Paul tells Rosa about cancer relapse, but he does not want chemo. Kurt to Rainer: Daniel was bluffing. Elias turns up at Isabelle's. Flashback: Isabelle pens symbol on their wrists. Present: Robert burns documents and USB. Thomas loads rifle.
22	4	"Steam" (Dampf)	Claudio Fäh, Mauro Mueller	Andreas Stadler, Béla Batthyany	25 January 2022
Rosa's nightmare: she holds gun; Paul lies dead. Manfred at gravel yard: Thomas left suitcase. Isabelle to Rosa: unaware of Betsch receiving 50,000 francs. Greta begins inauguration of reservoir. Manfred and Rosa follow Thomas' mobile to reservoir. Nora finds Thomas' confession letter, plus money. Police follow Thomas to reservoir's top. Nora screams upon seeing Thomas. Crowd watches Thomas plummet to his death. Nora accuses Robert: murderer! Kurt asks for bonus; Robert outraged by insensitivity. Manuel inconsolable blames Nora for divorce. Rainer's creditor asks for payment; henchman attacks Rainer. Res and Isabelle: send Elias into care home. Manfred: Thomas suicided because of Koni's death. Manfred wants to bug Räbers. Julie lies: Daniel fathered her baby. Kurt steals mother's jewellery. Nora rereads Thomas' letter. Kurt sees Rainer's finger missing. Rainer refuses jewellery as payment. Rosa visits Daniel; unable to bug his mobile. Rosa kisses Daniel, but does not want more from Daniel. Rainer sees Tim's newspaper photo. Robert offers to help Nora. Her requests: Robert will buy gravel yard, Manu wil work for Räbers. Rainer, brandishing gun, enters car when Paul picks up Tim. Manfred and Rosa meet Räbers; Rainer phones Daniel: he has Tim. Rainer has Paul drive them away.
23	5	"Shot" (Schuss)	Claudio Fäh, Mauro Mueller	Andreas Stadler, Béla Batthyany	1 February 2022
Isabelle dreaming: washing dishes, sees her dead baby. Paul's mobile: no answer. Rainer throws it out window. Räbers and Kurt: kidnapper unknown. Rainer chased by patrol car to gravel yard; locks Tim and Paul in site office. Police surround Rainer's position. Rosa gets closer. Daniel and Kurt arrive at yard. Rainer demands money and escape car. Paul forces boarded window open. Rosa sees Tim escaping through window. When Rainer opens door, Paul hits him with shovel. Rainer recovers, knocks Paul down. Rainer sees Rosa and shoots; she shoots back: injures Rainer, who runs off. Rainer escapes police; aims gun at Daniel. Kurt and Rainer grapple; shot fired: Rainer's dead. Rosa discovers Tim and Paul; quits case to care for them. Elias stands above road tunnel as Charlotte's bus approaches. Kurt denies ever seeing Rainer. Robert denies any contact. Daniel to Kurt: will pay bonus. Kurt decrypts Robert's USB. Daniel denies cartel's existence. Manuel reads Thomas' letter. Kurt views unedited gravel yard CCTV: Thomas and Robert returned to yard. Robert threatens Koni. Thomas hits Koni. Robert and Thomas place Koni under gravel dump: killing Koni. Kurt messages Daniel. Daniel and Julie have sex. Elias overly sexual with Isabelle; she rebuffs him.
24	6	"Disgrace" (Schande)	Claudio Fäh, Mauro Mueller	Andreas Stadler, Béla Batthyany	8 February 2022
Isabelle wakes, Elias' gone. Nora shows Thomas' letter to Manfred. Manfred enacts search warrant for Räbers' business. Robert denies cartel's existence or killing Betsch. Daniel asks Greta for help. Rosa, Res and Isabelle search for Elias; discover painted stones. Res finds Betsch's bloodied torch. Elias stands above road tunnel exit as others approach. Elias points at Res, yells: baby! Charlotte's bus approaches, Elias deliberately falls in front. Charlotte cradles her dead son. Manfred's warrant rescinded by appeals chamber. Robert released. Flashback: Baby's born, Res yells at Elias for impregnating Isabelle. Res drives Charlotte, who drowns baby; Elias sees them. Present: Isabelle outraged by Charlotte's betrayal. Res: struggled with Elias, who struck his head. Charlotte charged with murder; Res with aiding and abetting. Julie leaves Daniel; baby's not his. Daniel to Robert: saw USB video. At cartel meeting, Robert resigns; Daniel kicks Robert out. Julie carries Betsch's baby. Rosa bans Daniel from Tim. Tim's drawing: Isabelle's star belt. At Isabelle's, Rosa finds belt missing a star. Flashback: Isabelle discovers Betsch cheating. He admits his affair; almost hits Elias. Betsch gloats about fathering Julie's baby. Isabelle bashes Betsch to death. Present: Manfred arrests Isabelle. One year later: Rosa, Tim and Manfred visit Paul's grave.
