= Alice & Jack =

British television series

- Genre: Romantic drama
- Created by: Victor Levin
- Written by: Victor Levin
- Directed by: Juho Kuosmanen; Hong Khaou
- Starring: Andrea Riseborough; Domhnall Gleeson; Aisling Bea; Aimee Lou Wood; Sunil Patel
- Theme music composer: Stephen Rennicks
- Country of origin: United Kingdom
- Original language: English
- No. of episodes: 6

Production
- Executive producers: Domnhall Gleeson; Andrea Riseborough; Victor Levin; Juho Kuosmanen; Richard Yee; Krishnendu Majumdar; Michael London; Shannon Gaulding; Lorenzo De Maio; Rebecca Dundon; Hilary Martin
- Producer: Tracy O'Riordan
- Production companies: Fremantle; Me + You Productions; Groundswell Productions; De Maio Entertainment; Masterpiece

Original release
- Network: Channel 4 (United Kingdom)
- Release: 14 February – 29 February 2024
- Network: PBS (United States)
- Release: 17 March – 21 April 2024

Alice & Jack is a British television miniseries made for Channel 4 and PBS. A romantic drama created and written by Victor Levin, it stars Andrea Riseborough and Domhnall Gleeson.

Alice & Jack premiered on 14 February 2024. The series consists of 6 episodes.

== Synopsis ==
The series follows the lives of its titular characters over a decade and a half. Alice, a high-strung loner who works in finance, goes on a date with Jack, a shy, gentle scientist. After spending one night together, they go their separate ways, but there is an attraction that keeps bringing them back together time and again in spite of themselves.

== Cast ==
- Andrea Riseborough as Alice
- Domhnall Gleeson as Jack
- Aisling Bea as Lynn
- Aimee Lou Wood as Maya
- Sunil Patel as Paul
- Rachel Adedeji as Donna
- Tommy McDonnell as Danny
- Millie Ashford as teenage Celia
- Thalissa Teixeira as Rachel
- Ella Bruccoleri as Louise

== Episodes ==
No.	Title	Directed by	Written by	Original release date	U.S. airdate
1	"1"	Juho Kuosmanen	Victor Levin	14 February 2024	17 March 2024
2	"2"	Juho Kuosmanen	Victor Levin	15 February 2024	24 March 2024
3	"3"	Hong Khaou; Juho Kuosmanen	Victor Levin	21 February 2024	31 March 2024
4	"4"	Hong Khaou	Victor Levin	22 February 2024	7 April 2024
5	"5"	Hong Khaou	Victor Levin	28 February 2024	14 April 2024
6	"6"	Hong Khaou	Victor Levin	29 February 2024	21 April 2024

== Production ==
Alice & Jack was created and written by Victor Levin. The directors include Juho Kuosmanen and Hong Khaou. The series was a Fremantle production in partnership with Me + You Productions, Groundswell Productions and De Maio Entertainment and Masterpiece. Tracy O'Riordan is producer on the series. Andrea Riseborough and Domnhall Gleeson both starred and executive produced. Other executive producers include Levin, Kuosmanen, Richard Yee and Krishnendu Majumdar, Michael London, Shannon Gaulding, Lorenzo De Maio, Rebecca Dundon and Hilary Martin.

=== Casting ===
Joining Riseborough and Gleeson in the cast were Aisling Bea, Sunil Patel and Aimee Lou Wood.

=== Filming ===
Filming took place in London, southeast England and Gran Canaria in the summer of 2022.

== Broadcast ==
The series premiered in the UK on Channel 4 on 14 February 2024 and in the US on Masterpiece on March 17, 2024.

== Reception ==
Anita Singh of the Telegraph awarded the series two stars out of five, writing that "Andrea Riseborough and Domhnall Gleeson are narcissistic and sappy, respectively, in this pretentious foil to Netflix's current hit rom-com."

James Hibbs of the Radio Times writes:

Impressive performances, insufferable characters.

There's innovation in this show's bones, and that's to be applauded. It's clear that everyone involved in this project cares about it deeply, and wanted to make something new, something original.

In a number of ways, they have succeeded. Alice & Jack feels unique as you watch it, helped along by two phenomenal performances, strong visuals and a dazzling score. It largely feels more like an indie film than a series.

When the story allows these characters to explore other aspects of the human experience, rather than just their destructive, self-indulgent love story, is when it comes alive.

Lucy Mangan, in The Guardian, gives two stars out of five and writes: "Andrea Riseborough and Domhnall Gleeson have zero chemistry. ... Alice & Jack works harder and harder to convince us of everything, but, despite the talented leads giving it their all, there isn't enough to convince us of anything."

Vicky Jessop in The Standard website also gives two stars out of five and writes: "...this bleeding hearts story needs a defibrillator ... Quite why either Domhnall Gleeson or Andrea Riseborough signed up for this is a mystery".

Carol Midgley, in The Times, gives it four out of five stars and says: "I've fallen for this anti-rom-com".
