= London Kills =

British television series

- Genre: Police procedural
- Created by: Paul Marquess
- Written by: Paul Marquess; Jake Riddell; Sally Tatchell; Sarah-Louise Hawkins
- Directed by: Craig Pickles
- Starring: Hugo Speer; Sharon Small; Bailey Patrick; Tori Allen-Martin; Jennie Jacques
- Composer: Justine Barker
- Country of origin: United Kingdom
- Original language: English
- No. of series: 4
- No. of episodes: 20

Production
- Executive producers: Paul Marquess; Shane Murphy
- Producer: Mary Hare
- Production location: London
- Cinematography: Nick Manley
- Editor: Paul Endacott
- Running time: 45 minutes approx.
- Production company: Acorn

Original release
- Network: Acorn TV
- Release: 26 February 2019 – present

London Kills is a British police procedural television series, written and created by Paul Marquess, that premièred on Acorn TV on 26 February 2019 in the United States. One of Acorn TV's first original commissions, London Kills centres around an elite murder investigation squad in London headed by DI David Bradford (Hugo Speer), an experienced detective whose judgement is called into question following the unexpected disappearance of his wife.

The series follows on from Marquess' former London-based police procedural series Suspects. The cast features a number of striking similarities, includes a documentary-style feel and has an ad-lib script allowing the cast partially to improvise their lines based on a synopsis.

In December 2024, London Kills was renewed for a fifth series, However As of November 2026, there has been no official filming or casting details and airing information released by Acorn TV.

== Cast ==
- Hugo Speer as Detective Inspector David Bradford: head of the Metropolitan Police Murder Investigation Team
- Sharon Small as Detective Sergeant Vivienne Cole
- Bailey Patrick as Rob Brady: senior Detective Constable and seasoned investigator
- Tori Allen-Martin as Billie Fitzgerald: trainee detective constable and the youngest member of David's team
- Jennie Jacques as Amber Saunders (series 1): a homeless witness who befriends Billie
- Maimie McCoy as Grace Harper (series 2): witness under the protection of Detective Inspector David Bradford
- John Michie plays Detective Chief Superintendent Jack Mulgrew (series 3)
- Benjamin O'Mahony as Sergeant Ian Durrant (series 3)

== Release ==
Outside the United States, the series was originally to be broadcast on Channel 5, although the broadcaster later pulled out of the deal. The BBC subsequently purchased the first five-episode series for broadcast as part of their daytime schedule and began broadcasting episodes daily at 1:45pm from 24 June 2019. The first series was released on Region 2 DVD on 1 July 2019. Series 1 was released in Australia (Region 4) on 6 May 2020. The second series premièred in the United States on 15 July 2019.

== Episodes ==
Series	Episodes	Originally released		First airdate (BBC One)	Last airdate (BBC One)
Series	Episodes	First released	Last released	First airdate (BBC One)	Last airdate (BBC One)
1	5	26 February 2019	26 February 2019	24 June 2019	28 June 2019
2	5	15 July 2019	15 July 2019	30 March 2020	3 April 2020
3	5	6 June 2022	6 June 2022	17 October 2022	21 October 2022
4	5	10 July 2023	10 July 2023	27 October 2023	24 November 2023

=== Series 1 (2019) ===
No. overall	No. in series	Episode	Directed by	Written by	Original US release date	Original UK air date
1	1	"The Politician's Son"	Craig Pickles	Paul Marquess	26 February 2019	24 June 2019
Fresh back from leave following the disappearance of his wife, DI David Bradford heads up the investigation into the death of the son of a prominent politician, who is found hanging from a tree, having been severely disfigured. Trainee DC Billie Fitzgerald befriends the first witness on the scene, Amber Saunders (Jennie Jacques), a young homeless girl currently seeking refuge in a nearby hostel. David's ability to keep his cool is called into question when he berates DS Vivienne Cole for reportedly leaking sensitive information to the victim's mother, Kirsten Pryce (Glynis Barber).
2	2	"Stag Night"	Craig Pickles	Jake Riddell	26 February 2019	25 June 2019
When groom-to-be Mitchell MacDonald is fatally attacked in an alleyway on his stag night, suspicion falls upon his stepson, Will, who following the attack, has disappeared without trace. Vivienne suspects Will's father, Jacob (Dean Andrews), a former acquaintance of DI Bradford, is somehow connected to the attack, and when Will finally resurfaces, his involvement becomes clear. But are the rumours that Mitchell was an unconvicted paedophile really true? Meanwhile, meeting up for a drink after work, Billie struggles to shake off Amber's advances, and the pair share a steamy kiss.
3	3	"Blood Lines"	Craig Pickles	Sally Tatchell	26 February 2019	26 June 2019
When respected doctor Adam Garrick is found murdered on his houseboat, suspicion falls upon the anonymous 999 caller who reported the death. She is soon identified as Eleanor Kemp, one of Adam's junior colleagues, with whom he appears to have been having an affair. But when Eleanor provides an alibi for the time of the murder, Billie enlists Amber's help to track down Adam's brother Sammy, who has been sleeping rough after leaving prison for a lengthy sentence for manslaughter. Despite a confession from Sammy, there seems to be serious doubt that he is telling the truth based on the way the body was positioned after the murder. It seems whoever killed Adam lovingly tucked him in and even kissed him on the forehead, leading the detectives to believe it could be his mother.
4	4	"Sex Games"	Craig Pickles	Sarah-Louise Hawkins	26 February 2019	27 June 2019
When a body washes up on the shore of the river Thames, DI Bradford expects the worst – but the victim soon turns out to be the co-owner of a local dating agency. As the team dig deeper, they discover the man with whom she had spent the night before is dead, having seemingly shot himself. Although the case appears to be open-and-shut, the identification of a third individual, who followed the couple home that night, leads them to suspect there is more to the case than meets the eye. And when they catch up with the individual, Lee Kirkham (Jack Doolan), the case begins to unravel.
5	5	"Connected"	Craig Pickles	Jake Riddell	26 February 2019	28 June 2019
The hunt for Amber Saunders continues following Billie's stabbing, but DI Bradford has a more pressing matter on his mind – just how and why Amber came to be involved in his wife's disappearance. Discovering that Amber lied about being homeless, the team raid a flat where they find a number of fake ID cards – including one which leads DI Bradford to finally piece together Amber's link to his wife. But before he can catch up with her, Amber makes it her mission to befriend his teenage daughter Carly. When DI Bradford arrives home to find Amber in his flat, tragedy strikes.

=== Series 2 (2019) ===
No. overall	No. in series	Episode	Directed by	Written by	Original US release date	Original UK air date
6	1	"The Dark"	Fiona Walton	Sarah Louise-Hawkins	15 July 2019	30 March 2020
Builders renovating a house of multiple occupancy in Camden Town uncover human remains beneath wooden decking in the back garden. The victim turns out to be a student who had been sharing the house with several college friends until he vanished almost a year ago. Initial investigation leads the team to suspect that he may have taken his own life after discovering his pregnant girlfriend was leaving him for another man, but pathology reports suggest he suffered a blow to the head shortly prior to death. Carly continues to accuse David of involvement in her mother's disappearance.
7	2	"The Ultimate Price"	Fiona Walton	Claire Fryer	15 July 2019	31 March 2020
Pub landlord Terry Fisher is found bludgeoned to death with a baseball bat in the basement of his beloved South London pub. His only full time employee, Leanne Ponting (Laura Aikman) has an alibi for the time of the attack, and Vivienne isn't happy that the only witness to the crime was Terry's eight-year-old grandson Troy, who made the 999 call. When Rob notices a change in Troy's behaviour, he suspects he may have been the victim of domestic abuse. Meanwhile, Vivienne presses Rob to tell the MisPer team the truth about David's whereabouts on the night of Sarah's disappearance.
8	3	"Family Affairs"	Fiona Walton	Sarah Louise-Hawkins	15 July 2019	1 April 2020
Nineteen-year-old Portuguese au pair Ana Bestos is found murdered in a lock-up close to the business district in Kings Cross. Her previous employers, the Charr family, come under scrutiny when it transpires that Ana was pregnant at the time of her death, despite claiming to have been a virgin. The investigation is turned on its head when Andrew Charr (Marc Baylis) later admits to having had a homosexual affair with Ana's cousin Gabrielo. Meanwhile, Vivienne and Rob find themselves in hot water when they continue to probe the circumstances surrounding Sarah's disappearance.
9	4	"Turf War"	Sean Glynn	Sally Tatchell	15 July 2019	2 April 2020
The double murder of gangland boss Marcus Maguire and his son Callum sends shockwaves across the criminal community in London – and David suspects that a former acquaintance, Adrian Cook (Steve John Shepherd), may have played a part in their demise. Matters are further complicated by an ex-detective constable with a beeline for Marcus' much younger girlfriend, Gloria. Although he admits to the murders, Rob continues to probe Cook's involvement, and when the pair finally meet, Cook issues an ultimatum: arrest him, or release him in return for details on Sarah's whereabouts.
10	5	"Capture"	Sean Glynn	Jake Riddell	15 July 2019	3 April 2020
Taxi driver Danny Roscoe is found beaten to death on wasteground in Greenwich, leaving Rob in an awkward position: as he was the man Adrian Cook named as knowing the whereabouts of Sarah Bradford. Investigations into Roscoe's private life reveal a penchant for burglary, handed down from his father-in-law. His wife Petra (Lorna Fitzgerald) reveals he claimed to have seen Sarah held captive in the cellar of a house he burgled the previous day, but as the team try to track his last known movements, Cook tries to throw a spanner in the works by making a complaint against Rob.

=== Series 3 (2022) ===
No. overall	No. in series	Episode	Directed by	Written by	Original US release date	Original UK air date
11	1	"Grace"	Sean Glynn	Paul Marquess	6 June 2022	17 October 2022
The detectives investigate a string of murders. Could the killer be a police officer? Meanwhile, Rob is forced to hand over vital evidence when his family is threatened.
12	2	"Cyber Bully"	Sean Glynn	Sally Tatchell	6 June 2022	18 October 2022
As the detectives investigate who murdered a schoolboy, Vivienne is forced to reveal her intimate connection to a suspect.
13	3	"Blood"	Craig Pickles	Sarah-Louise Hawkins	6 June 2022	19 October 2022
When a locksmith is murdered, Billie learns he was a witness to her father's death 10 years earlier. Vivienne pleads with her ex-husband to do the right thing, but he is afraid they're both in danger.
14	4	"Control Freak"	Sean Glynn	Sarah-Louise Hawkins	6 June 2022	20 October 2022
A body found in a suitcase is identified as a man who has been missing for several weeks. His widow and his brother point the finger at each other. Meanwhile, David tries to convince Mulgrew to reveal what he knows.
15	5	"Crossing the Line"	Craig Pickles	Jake Riddell	6 June 2022	21 October 2022
David and Vivienne cross a huge line, both professionally and personally.

=== Series 4 (2023) ===
No. overall	No. in series	Episode	Directed by	Written by	Original US release date	Original UK air date
16	1	"Wake-up Call"	Sean Glynn	Paul Marquess	N/A	27 October 2023
With Rob framed for murder, David's gung-ho interference does more harm than good.
17	2	"Fallout"	Sean Glynn	Sally Tatchell	N/A	3 November 2023
A soldier's suspicious demise reveals family lies and the consequences of an accident.
18	3	"Old Wounds"	Craig Pickles	Sarah-Louise Hawkins	N/A	10 November 2023
David doubts a fatal stabbing links to a local girl gang's actions, but Billie disagrees.
19	4	"Amnesia"	Sean Glynn	Sarah-Louise Hawkins	N/A	17 November 2023
Drinking links the end of a killed man's marriage and his son's revenge attempt.
20	5	"Vendetta"	Craig Pickles	Jake Riddell	N/A	24 November 2023
A parental revelation might be a murder motive, but a grudge derails David's judgement.

== Home media ==
DVD Releases
Series	Region 2	Region 4
1	1 July 2019	6 May 2020
2	6 April 2020	18 November 2020
1–2	6 April 2020	N/A
3	TBA	7 September 2022
1–3	TBA	N/A
1 - 4	27 Nov 2023	
