= Hong Khaou =

British filmmaker (born 1975)

- Born: 22 October 1975 (age 50); Cambodia
- Education: University for the Creative Arts
- Occupations: Director; screenwriter
- Years active: 2005–present

Hong Khaou (born 22 October 1975) is a British film director and screenwriter. He is known for his feature film debut, Lilting (2014).

== Early life and education ==
Khaou was born in Cambodia, the youngest of four children born to Chinese-Cambodian parents. He was a few months old when the family fled to Vietnam after the Fall of Phnom Penh. They moved to England as political refugees when Khaou was eight years old. He studied BA (Hons) Film Production at the Surrey Institute of Art & Design in Farnham, where he graduated in 1997.

== Career ==
Khaou's short film Spring played at both the Sundance Film Festival, and the Berlin International Film Festival in 2011, with his previous short Summer also having premiered at Berlin in 2006.

His debut feature film Lilting was produced under the Film London micro-budget scheme Microwave, and was released on 8 August 2014 in the United Kingdom by distributors Artificial Eye.

He is the recipient of the 2014 Sundance Institute/Mahindra Global Filmmaking Award for his 2019 feature film Monsoon.

In 2021, Khaou directed four episodes of season 2 of the BBC One mystery television series Baptiste.

In 2023, he was announced as the director of Mr Loverman, BBC One's television series adaptation of Bernardine Evaristo's novel of the same name, starring Lennie James; and Alice & Jack, a romantic drama miniseries for Channel 4.

In 2026, Khaou executive produced the MGM+ and BBC One miniseries A Tale of Two Cities. It is based on the novel of the same name by Charles Dickens.

== Filmography ==
Short film

- Waiting for Movement (2005)
- Summer (2006)
- Spring (2011)

=== Feature film ===
- Lilting (2014)
- Monsoon (2019)

=== Television ===
- Baptiste (2021)
- Alice & Jack (2024)
- Mr Loverman (2024)
- A Tale of Two Cities (2026; executive producer only)
