= Lilting (film) =

- Theatrical release poster
- Directed by: Hong Khaou
- Written by: Hong Khaou
- Produced by: Dominic Buchanan
- Starring: Ben Whishaw; Cheng Pei-pei; Andrew Leung; Morven Christie; Naomi Christie; Peter Bowles
- Cinematography: Urszula Pontikos
- Edited by: Mark Towns
- Music by: Stuart Earl
- Production companies: Strand Releasing; Film London Microwave; BBC Films; British Film Institute; Stink; Sums Film & Media; Protagonist Pictures
- Distributed by: Artificial Eye
- Release dates: 16 January 2014 (Sundance Film Festival); 8 August 2014 (United Kingdom)
- Running time: 91 minutes
- Country: United Kingdom
- Languages: English; Mandarin Chinese
- Budget: £120,000
- Box office: $247,377

Lilting (Chinese: 轻轻摇晃; pinyin: Qīngqīng yáohuàng) is a 2014 British romantic drama film written and directed by Cambodian-born British director Hong Khaou and produced by Dominic Buchanan.

The film had its world premiere on 16 January 2014 on Day One of the Sundance Film Festival, at which it competed in the World Cinema Dramatic Competition. It won the "Cinematography Award: World Cinema Dramatic" at the festival. The film was released theatrically in United Kingdom on 8 August 2014 and in the United States on 26 September 2014.

== Synopsis ==
Lilting tells the story of a mother's attempt at understanding who her son was after his untimely death. Her world is suddenly disrupted by the presence of his lover. Together, they attempt to overcome their grief whilst struggling against not having a shared language.

== Cast ==
- Ben Whishaw as Richard
- Cheng Pei-pei as Junn
- Naomi Yang (credited as Naomi Christie) as Vann
- Peter Bowles as Alan
- Morven Christie as Margaret
- Andrew Leung as Kai

== Production ==
The script, originally titled Lilting the Past, won third spot in the 2011 Brit List, a list of the best unproduced British screenplays.

The film was one of three films greenlit by Microwave in early 2012. A casting call was later released for the three lead roles, later filled by Cheng Pei-pei, Ben Whishaw, and Andrew Leung.

Filming began in November 2012 and completed principal photography in December 2012. Director Khaou has said the film will be visually inspired by Wong Kar-wai's In the Mood for Love.

During production, as part of the Microwave scheme, Michael Winterbottom mentored writer/director Khaou, while producer Buchanan was mentored by Ken Marshall, producer of London to Brighton, Filth and Song for Marion. As with all Microwave films, the budget was £120,000. It is the first bilingual film to be made under the Microwave scheme.

== Reception ==
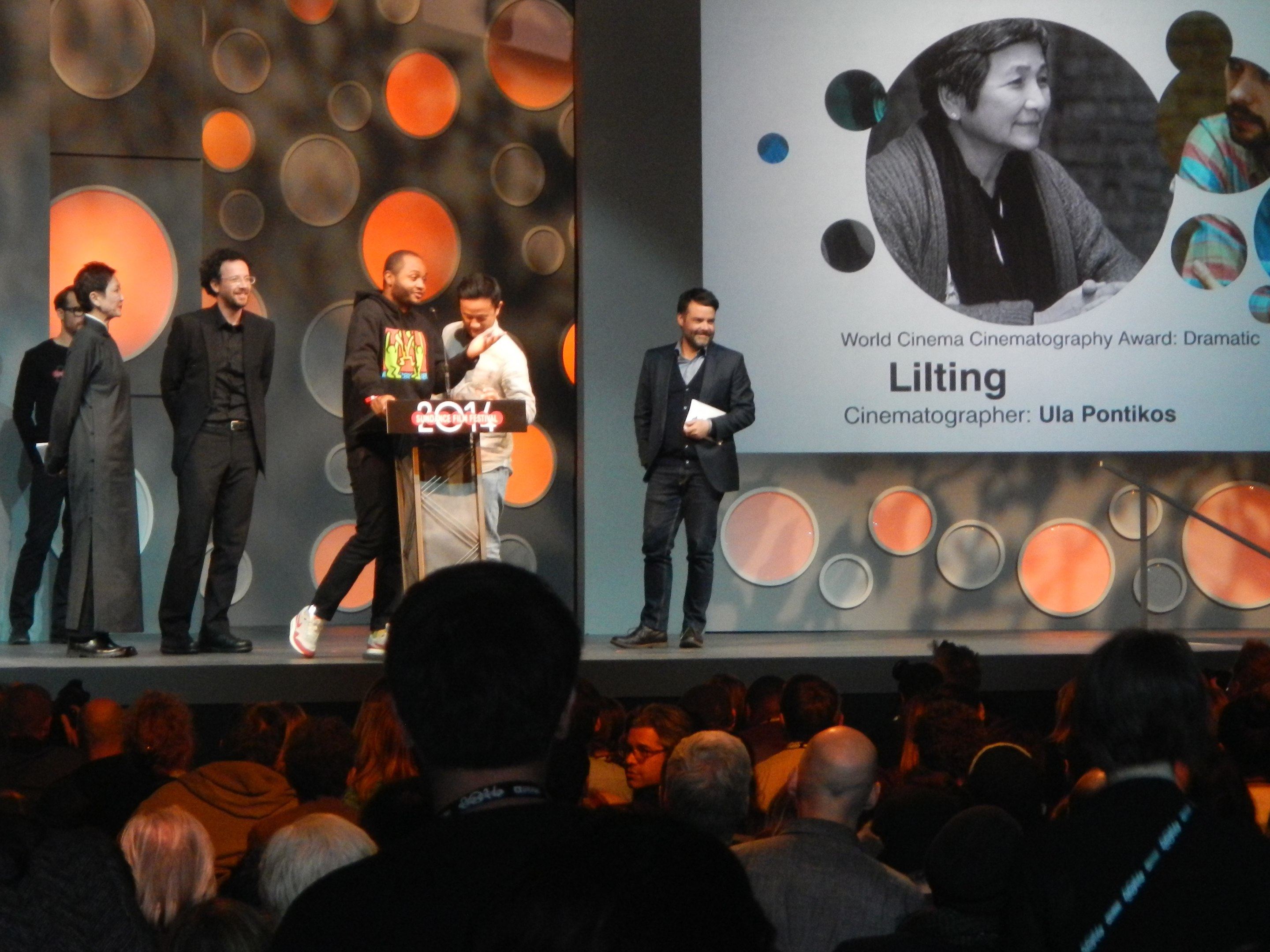
Lilting won the Cinematography Award at the 2014 Sundance Film Festival.

=== Critical response ===
Lilting was met with positive reviews from critics. As of June 2020, the film holds an 84% approval rating on review aggregator Rotten Tomatoes, based on 55 reviews with an average rating of 6.88/10. The website's critics consensus reads: "Skillfully weaving multiple delicate tonal strands into a quietly affecting whole, Lilting serves as a thoroughly compelling calling card for writer-director Hong Khaou." On Metacritic the film has 61 rating from 22 reviews indicating "generally favorable reviews".

Justin Chang, in his review for Variety, said that the film "Hong Khaou makes a fine debut with this quietly resonant cross-cultural chamber piece." David Rooney of The Hollywood Reporter praised the film, saying, "Delicate and unhurried almost to a fault, though also hauntingly sexy and even humorous at times." Amber Wilkinson from Telegraph gave the film three out of five stars and praised the lead actor that "Whishaw is magnetic as a man pushed to the edge of fragility by mourning, but who still suggests a quiet strength." Dominic Mill of We Got This Covered gave a positive review and said, "The subject matter is powerful, and the performances are wonderful – in a world of big and showy dramatism, Lilting gets its point across without feeling the need to shout about it."

=== Accolades ===
Year	Award	Category	Recipient	Result
2014	Sundance Film Festival	World Cinema Grand Jury Prize: Dramatic	Hong Khaou	Nominated
2014	Sundance Film Festival	Cinematography Award: World Cinema Dramatic	Urszula Pontikos	Won
2015	26th GLAAD Media Awards	Outstanding Film - Limited Release	Hong Khaou	Won
2016	Apolo Awards	Best Cinematography	Urszula Pontikos	Nominated
2016	Apolo Awards	Best New Director	Hong Khaou	Won
2016	Apolo Awards	Best Actress	Cheng Pei-pei	Nominated
