= Wallace High School, Stirling =

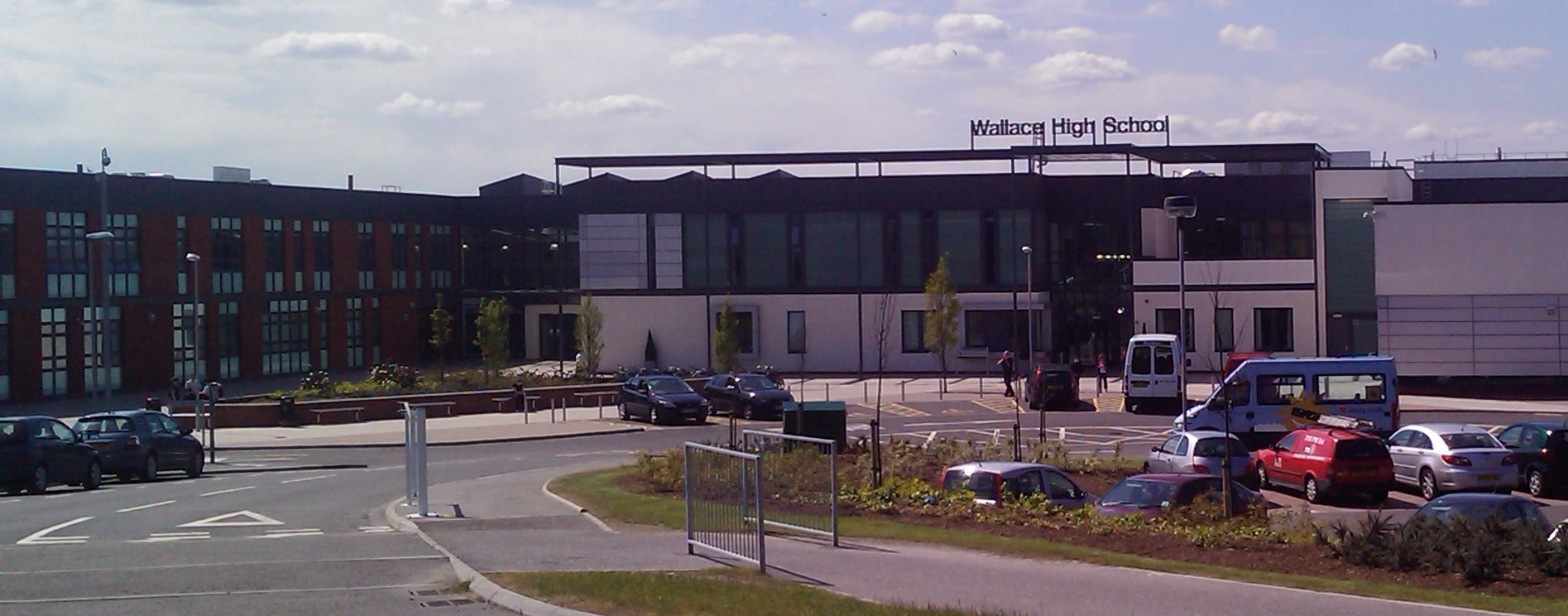

Location
- Airthrey Road; Stirling, Stirlingshire, FK9 5HW; Scotland; 56.1400°N 3.9275°W

Information
- Type: State
- Motto: "Fide Ut Rupe Fundatium" (To build upon a rock)
- Established: 1971
- Headteacher: S Pennock
- Gender: Mixed
- Age: 11 to 18
- Enrolment: 1,050+
- Houses: Airthrey, Logie, Powis
- Colours: Purple and Silver (Previously Purple and Gold )
- Website: http://www.wallacehigh.org.uk/

Wallace High School is a non-denominational state secondary school in Causewayhead, Stirling. The school was founded in 1971 to serve Bridge of Allan, Castleview, Cornton, Fallin, Raploch and Riverside areas of north-eastern Stirling.

The headteacher Scott Pennock has decided to leave his role as head teacher, after more than 14 years, Julie Christie is now Head Teacher.

== History ==
Wallace High School was founded in 1971 to provide education to children of northern and north-eastern Stirling. The catchment area is Bridge of Allan, Castleview, Cornton, Fallin, Raploch, and Riverside. The University of Stirling is in close proximity, and the school has formed strong links with the institution. Wallace High School is one of seven secondary schools in the Stirling Council area. In 2008, the school moved from its initial location on Dumyat Road to a new building on Airthrey Road which was funded by a public private partnership. It is located close to the famous Wallace Monument, which commemorates the Scottish patriot Sir William Wallace.

== Operation ==
The school has roughly over 1,050 pupils and operates a house system. The three houses are Airthrey, Logie and Powis, which are both for social and administrative purposes. Airthrey is Red, Logie is Blue and Powis is Yellow.

The school is also colour coded with Science (Biology, Chemistry and Physics) and Social Subjects (Geography, History and Modern Studies) situated in Airthrey (red), Music, Design and Engineering (Graphic Communication, Woodworking, and Design and Manufacture), Art, Computing Science, Digital Skills, Business and Maths in Logie (blue) and finally RMPS (Religious Moral and Philosophical Education), Home Economics, Modern Languages (English, French and Spanish) and PE (Physical Education) in Powis (yellow).

Stirling Council's only secondary Gaelic Medium provision is situated at the school where young people have the opportunity to progress their learning from S1-S3 into the Senior Phase leading to the award of National Qualifications.

== Notable former students ==
- Kenny Logan, Rugby Player for Stirling County RFC and Glasgow District at amateur level; Glasgow Warriors, Wasps RFC and London Scottish at professional level; and Scotland at international level
- Mirren Mack, actress Sex Education and The Nest (2020)
- Finn Russell, Rugby Player for Glasgow Warriors, Racing 92, Bath Rugby and Scotland
- Andrew MacLeod, Paralympian for British Paralympics
