= The Nest (British TV series) =

British television series

- Genre: Thriller
- Written by: Nicole Taylor
- Directed by: Andy De Emmony
- Starring: Martin Compston; Sophie Rundle; Mirren Mack; Fiona Bell; James Harkness; Liz Ewing; Bailey Patrick; Katie Leung; Samuel Small; Christine Bottomley; David Hayman; Shirley Henderson; Kate Dickie; Siobhan Redmond
- Country of origin: United Kingdom
- Original language: English
- No. of series: 1
- No. of episodes: 5

Production
- Production company: Studio Lambert

Original release
- Network: BBC One
- Release: 22 March – 13 April 2020

The Nest is a British television drama thriller series starring Sophie Rundle, Martin Compston, and Mirren Mack. Broadcasting began on BBC One on 22 March 2020.

== Synopsis ==
Emily and Dan, a married couple who want to have a baby, find that they are unable to conceive. Kaya, an 18-year-old woman, offers to be their surrogate mother.

== Cast and characters ==
- Sophie Rundle as Emily Docherty
- Martin Compston as Dan Docherty
- Mirren Mack as Kaya
- James Harkness as James
- Fiona Bell as Hilary
- Liz Ewing as Janis
- Shirley Henderson as Siobhan
- David Hayman as Souter
- Bailey Patrick as Callum
- Katie Leung as Eleanor

== Episodes ==
No.	Title	Directed by	Written by	Original release date	U.K. viewers (millions)
1	"Episode 1"	Andy De Emmony	Nicole Taylor	22 March 2020	8.82
On parole teenager Kaya steps out in front of Emily's car, damaging her knee. At the hospital, Kaya discovers that Emily and Dan, her husband, want a baby. Their surrogate mother, Dan's sister, loses the baby and Kaya approaches Emily, offering to be their surrogate. Dan is strongly against the idea but Emily finally persuades him to agree.
2	"Episode 2"	Andy De Emmony	Nicole Taylor	29 March 2020	7.82
Months later, Kaya is pregnant and living with Emily and Dan. In the middle of the night, she leaves the house to go to a club. She does not drink and makes friends with a young mother, but when the woman discovers she is a surrogate, she leaves. Kaya then gets drunk and goes back to the house, where Dan finds her drunk. She threatens to kill him with a knife, and runs out. Emily chases after her and persuades her to return to the house.
3	"Episode 3"	Andy De Emmony	Nicole Taylor	5 April 2020	8.14
Dan discovers that as a young girl, Kaya killed a pregnant woman, and has since been given a new identity. He is later forced to tell Emily, while Kaya goes to the school prom with their nephew Jack. She then gives birth to the baby prematurely.
4	"Episode 4"	Simen Alsvik	Nicole Taylor	12 April 2020	8.07
Emily worries that Kaya was pregnant before the surrogacy was agreed on. She asks Kaya to take a DNA test, and the results reveal that the baby is related to neither Kaya nor Emily and Dan, and that the embryo was swapped. Kaya agrees that Emily and Dan can adopt the baby, but while they prepare the baby's room, Kaya's mother, Siobhan, persuades her to keep the baby. James is arrested for passing information from his social work to organised criminals.
5	"Episode 5"	Simen Alsvik	Nicole Taylor	13 April 2020	7.94
Siobhan invites a journalist to write an exposé on Dan's business, where it is revealed that he made money for the business by selling drugs. The resulting media coverage also highlights the surrogacy, and due to the ongoing media attention towards both Kaya and Emily and Dan, the baby's fate is undecided. Kaya forces her mother to leave after an argument, where it transpires that 11-year-old Kaya accidentally stabbed her pregnant aunt while breaking up a fight between her and Siobhan. When holding the baby, Kaya realises that she wants more for her life than to be a mother, and six months later, Emily and Dan are given care of the baby.

== Production ==
The Nest was written by Nicole Taylor, directed by Andy De Emmony, and produced by Clare Kerr for Studio Lambert.

The series was filmed in Glasgow, East Kilbride, Paisley, and Helensburgh, in Scotland. A holiday rental house on the shore of Scotland's Loch Long called Cape Cove was used as Emily and Dan's house in the series. The scenes where Emily is swimming were also filmed in Loch Long. Kaya's flat is situated in Gorbals, while the fictional "Calderwood Falls" waterfall was actually a waterfall located at the Devil's Pulpit. The Devil's Pulpit has previously been used as a setting for Starz period drama Outlander.

== Broadcast ==
The series aired on BBC One from 22 March 2020.

== Reception ==
The overall score on review aggregator website Rotten Tomatoes is 93%, based on 15 reviews.

Lucy Mangan of The Guardian, calling the series a "knotty moreish new thriller", gave The Nest 3 out of 5 stars.
