= Peter Kellogg (writer) =

American dramatist

Peter Kellogg is a musical theater book writer and lyricist. He wrote the lyrics and the book for the 1992 production of the Broadway musical Anna Karenina, for which he received two 1993 Tony Award nominations, one for Best Book of a musical and one for the Best Original Score. He also wrote the lyrics and book for the musicals Chasing Nicolette (originally titled Nicolette and Aucassin), Desperate Measures, Lincoln In Love, Stunt Girl (a.k.a. Front Page Girl), Money Talks (originally titled Money The Musical), and The Rivals which have been read and produced regionally. Kellogg also received the New York Musical Theatre Festival 2006 award for Excellence in Musical Theatre Writing (Book) for Desperate Measures. On June 3, 2018, Kellogg won the 2018 Drama Desk Award for Outstanding Lyrics for Desperate Measures.

In addition, along with Albert C Todd, Kellogg wrote the English lyrics for Unruly Horses, a musical conceived by Moni and Mina Yakim and based on the Soviet Union songwriter and folk hero Vladimir Vysotsky. The play is derived from the French actress Marina Vlady's best-selling memoir of her marriage and life with Vysotsky. The show features 24 musical numbers with English lyrics by Peter Kellogg and Albert C Todd and musical adaptation by Larry Hochman.

== Performances ==
On August 26, 1992, the Broadway production of Anna Karenina opened at the Circle in the Square Theatre in New York City. It ran for 46 performances.

The first production of Chasing Nicolette, then titled Nicolette and Aucassin, played at the Westport Country Playhouse from August 28, 2000, to September 9, 2000. The cast included Chuck Cooper (as King Mostansir), Bronson Pinchot, Bill Buell, Nancy K. Anderson, Jennifer Allen, Darlesia Cearcy (as Nicolette), James Judy, Jeremy Webb (as Aucassin), Richard White and Michael Wiggins. Seth Barrish directed.

In 2004, Desperate Measures had its limited engagement, world premiere at the Lyric Stage in Irving, Texas. The play ran from April 30-May 15, 2004.

From December 4, 2004, through January 5, 2005, The Prince Music Theater in Philadelphia, Pennsylvania performed Chasing Nicolette.

In 2008, the American Opera Projects in Brooklyn, New York performed five excerpts from the musical Unruly Horses as a workshop. In 2002, the musical had a one-month engagement at the King's Head Theatre, London, England under the title "Let Us Fly."

From March 18, 2009, to May 24, 2009, Stunt Girl played at The Village Theatre, Seattle, Washington.

On January 17, 2010, Goodspeed Opera House held a reading of the musical Lincoln In Love as part of The Fifth Annual Goodspeed Festival of New Artists produced by Goodspeed Musicals' Max Showalter Center for Education in the Musical Theater.

Mara Davi, Louis Hobson and John Patrick Lowrie headlined the June 7, 2010, reading of Stunt Girl, directed by Tony Award and Pulitzer Prize winner Brian Yorkey for the Manhattan Theatre Club's "7@7" reading series at New York City Center.

In 2012, a rhyming verse version of Desperate Measures was performed at The Spirit of Broadway Theater in Norwich, Ct. The show ran from June 27 to July 29. It was directed by Brett Bernardini, with choreography by Christine Snitken-Bouley, lighting design by Greg Solomon, scenic design by Mike Billings, sound design by Steven Hinchey, and musical direction by Dan Brandl.

On February 4, 2013, Theater Resources Unlimited, as part of its 2012/13 Tru Voices New Musicals Reading Series, held a reading at the Soho Playhouse of Chasing Nicolette under the direction of Gordon Greenberg. The cast included John Bolton, Alex Wyse, Allison Semmes, Nick Wyman, Dennis Parlato, Nathaniel Stampley, Alan Mingo Jr., Megan Lawrence, Dale Radunz and Kate Reinders.

From November 6, 2013, to December 8, 2013, The Spirit of Broadway Theater in Norwich, Connecticut performed Front Page Girl (previously known and performed as Stunt Girl). Brett Bernadini directed with Shauna Nicole Goodgold as the Front Page Girl Elizabeth Cochran and John Wilkening as Arthur Brisbane.

On July 9, 2014, The Summer Theatre of New Canaan held the first reading of Money The Musical, book and lyrics by Peter Kellogg and music by David Friedman, as part of the theater's UNDER THE STARS - NEW SUMMER THEATRE WORKS program. The actors were Lennie Watts, Shauna Goodgold, Kristoffer Lowe, Jamison Stern. Jodi Stevens Bryce narrated and Allegra Libonati directed.

At Theatre Three, 311 43rd St, NYC, a first reading of The Rivals occurred on July 18, 2014. The musical, based on the Richard Brinsley Sheridan play of the same name, has book and lyrics by Peter Kellogg and music by Stephen Weiner. The cast included Sierra Boggess as Lydia Languish, Jessie Mueller as Julia Melville, Marla Mindelle as Lucy, Beth Leavel as Mrs. Malaprop, Greg Mills as Captain Jack Absolute, Jim Weitzer as Faulkland, Brian Sills as Thomas, Ed Dixon as Sir Anthony Absolute, Jeff Brooks as Squire Bob Acres and Brooks Ashmanskas as Sir Lucius McTrigger.

On Friday, July 14, 2017, previews began for Money Talks with book and lyrics by Peter Kellogg, music by David Friedman, direction/choreography by Michael Chase Gosselin and musical direction by David Hancock Turner. The show opened on July 23, 2017, with a scheduled close on September 3, 2017, at The Davenport Theatre (354 W 45 Street, NYC). The cast includes: Ralph Byers (Broadway: The Music Man, Big River) as Ben Franklin with Brennan Caldwell (Off: Broadway: Baghdaddy. Web series: "Off"); Sandra DeNise (Broadway: Bright Star, Kinky Boots) and George Merrick (Broadway: Honeymoon in Vegas, South Pacific). The creative team includes Ann Beyersdorfer (Scenic Design), Vanessa Leuck (Costume Design), Catherine Clark (Lighting Design), Patrick LaChance (Sound Designer), Jason Styres, CSA (Casting), Carol A. Sullivan (Production Stage Manager), Gabby Cogan (Associate Choreographer) and Evan Bernardin (General Manager).

Desperate Measures previewed at the York Theatre in NYC on September 19, 2017, opened on October 2 for a two-week run, which was extended until December 31, 2017. The cast is Emma Degerstedt as Susanna/Sister Mary Jo, Gary Marachek as Father Morse, Lauren Molina as Bella Rose, Conor Ryan as Johnny Blood, Peter Saide as Sheriff Green, and Nick Wyman as Governor von Richterhenkenpflichtgetruber. Understudies are Anthony Festa, Celia Hottenstein, and Tom Souhrada. The creative team includes James Morgan (set), Nicole Wee (costumes), Paul Miller (lights), Julian Evans (sound), Deb Gaouette (props), Carol Hanzel (casting), Joseph Hayward (associate director), and Kevin Maloof (production manager). The production stage manager is Christine Lemme with assistant stage manager Laura C. Nelson.

The Bristol Riverside Theatre staged the world premiere of the new musical comedy The Rivals, based on Richard Brinsley Sheridan's farce, October 30–November 18, 2018. With book and lyrics by two-time Tony nominee Peter Kellogg and music by two-time Richard Rodgers Award winner Stephen Weiner (The Honeymooners), the production is directed by Eric Tucker (Bedlam's Sense and Sensibility) and choreographed by Jason A. Sparks (Hello, Dolly!).

The cast is led by Tony Award winner Harriet Harris (Thoroughly Modern Millie) as Mrs. Malaprop, Drama Desk winner Ed Dixon (Georgie: My Adventures with George Rose) as Sir Anthony Absolute, Erin Mackey (Wicked) as Lydia Languish, Kevin Massey (A Gentleman's Guide to Love & Murder) as Captain Jack Absolute, Charlotte Maltby (The Sound of Music national tour) as Julia Melville, Chris Dwan (Finding Neverland) as Squire Bob Acres, John Treacy Egan (My Fair Lady) as Sir Lucius McTrigger, Emma Stratton (Prince of Broadway) as Lucy, Joe Veale as Thomas, and Jim Weitzer (Phantom of the Opera) as Faulkland.
