= Jason Reischel =

American singer-songwriter

- Also known as: My Cousin, The Emperor
- Born: Jason Francis Reischel; April 19, 1976 (age 50); Huntington, New York, United States
- Origin: Asheville, North Carolina, United States
- Genres: rock, alternative country
- Occupations: Musician, singer-songwriter, poet,
- Instruments: Vocals, guitar, piano, harmonica, bass guitar, ukulele
- Years active: 2003–present
- Label: Augustus Music Group

Jason Reischel (born April 19, 1976) is an American singer-songwriter from Brooklyn, New York who sometimes goes by the stage name My Cousin, The Emperor.

== Early life and education ==
Reischel was born on April 19, 1976, in Huntington, New York, and was raised in Asheville, North Carolina. He began writing songs when he was 12 years old. He attended North Carolina State University, in Raleigh, North Carolina, majoring in history with dual minors in political science and classical studies. He moved to New York City in 2004, and began performing as a solo singer-songwriter.

== Career ==
Reischel began playing guitar when he was ten years old, and wrote his first song when he was in seventh grade. After his debut album Brown Bridge & Green Bridge was released in 2006, Reischel was compared to Elliott Smith, Tim Buckley, Paul Simon, and Townes Van Zandt. In 2008 he formed the band My Cousin, The Emperor.

On December 8, 2010, Reischel sat on a panel with Meshell Ndegeocello and Larry Kirwan of Black 47 at WNYC's The Greene Space to commemorate the 30th anniversary of John Lennon's death, and look at how today's musicians are inspired by him.

== Discography ==
=== Jason Reischel ===
- 2006 "Brown Bridge & Green Bridge"
- 2014 "Live on KXLU- Los Angeles (June 27, 2006)"
- 2014 "Irony-Free Parlor Music" (recorded in 2007 but unreleased until 2014)
- 2014 "Unfinished Melodies: Demos, Rare & Unreleased Vol. I"
- 2014 "Unfinished Melodies: Demos, Rare & Unreleased Vol. II"
- 2014 "Unfinished Melodies: Demos, Rare & Unreleased Vol. III"
- 2014 "Unfinished Melodies: Demos, Rare & Unreleased Vol. IV"

=== My Cousin, The Emperor ===
- 2009: "A Long Way From Home"
- 2011 "The Subway EPs, Vol. I: Prospect Park West"
- 2011 "The Subway EPs, Vol. II: Broadway- Lafayette"
- 2011 "The Subway EPs, Vol. III: Bushwick" (Unreleased)

== Charity ==
An acoustic version of the pre- My Cousin, The Emperor song "Justine" was donated to the charity album New York Cares About Local Music 2004. It was recorded live at CB's Gallery, New York, NY on August 5, 2004.

On August 21, 2006, Reischel played guitar for Lauren Molina during the "Fleet Street on the Bowery" Charity concert at The Bowery Ballroom featuring Michael Cerveris, Nellie McKay & Duncan Sheik. The Charity Concert raised money for Broadway Cares.

Reischel performed on January 17, 2010, with My Cousin, The Emperor at "Haiti Matters to Brooklyn", an emergency fundraiser for the victims of the devastating earthquake in Haiti which occurred on January 12, 2010.

My Cousin, The Emperor played a set at "Gluttons For Charity" at Hill Country, New York, NY on August 22, 2011. "Gluttons for Charity" was an event sponsored by CareerGears, a national nonprofit organization offering interview clothing and job counseling to men in need.

Reischel performed with Michael Feinberg at the 40 Watt Club in Athens, Georgia, on December 6, 2011, at the "Poverty is Real" Charity concert. Other performers included Patterson Hood (from Drive-By Truckers), Futurebirds, Woodfangs, and Claire Campbell. The song "Burly, Old Couch" was donated by the band for inclusion on the "Poverty is Real: Athens 2011" CD, featuring songs by Widespread Panic, Patterson Hood, Futurebirds, Modern Skirts, Hope for Agoldensummer, Venice is Sinking, and Dave Marr. Reischel also donated the My Cousin, The Emperor song "Montevideo" for the "Poverty is Real: Asheville 2012" CD in September 2012 which helped raise $5,000 for Pisgah Legal Services to combat Poverty.

Since 2013, Reischel has served on the board of directors for the NYC-based non-profit "Service Program for Older People" (SPOP), an agency that is "dedicated to enhancing the quality of life of adults age 55 and older and to fostering their independent living through the delivery of comprehensive mental health and supportive services, advocacy, and education."

== Awards ==
Winner of the 2009 Independent Music Award for Song of the Year (Alt-country) for "A Long Way From Home"
