= Angelo (Measure for Measure) =

Character in Measure for Measure

- Measure for Measure character
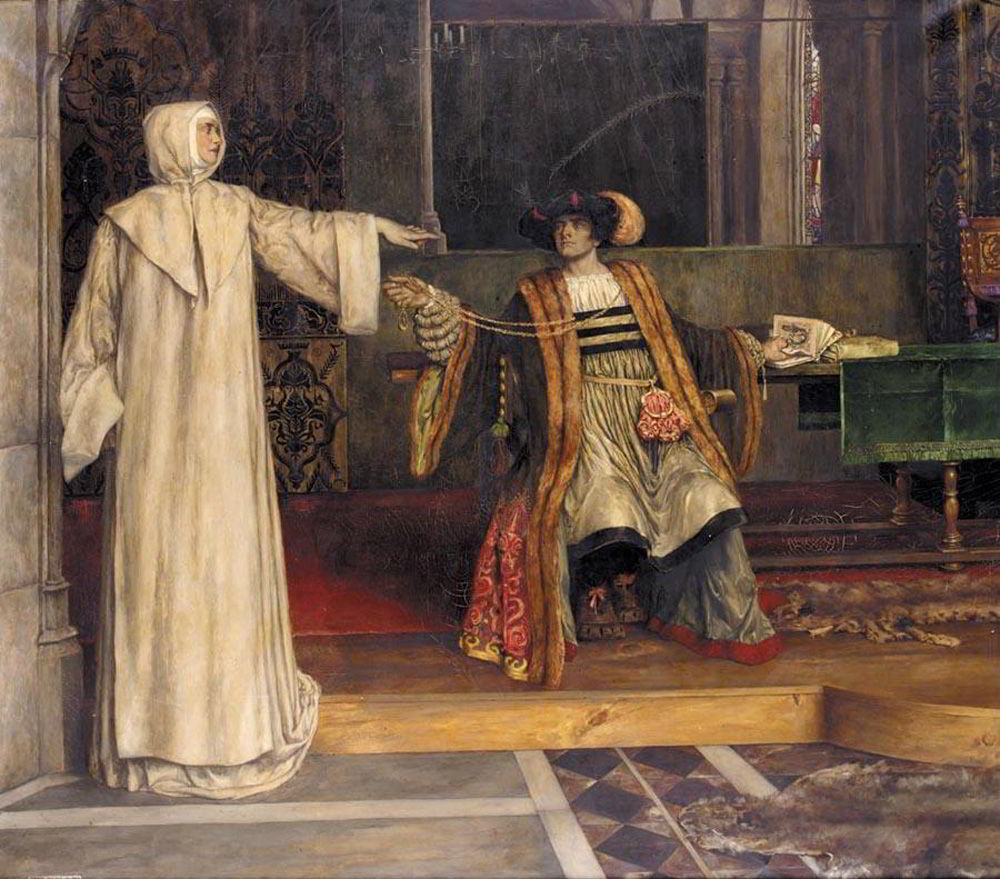
- Isabella and Angelo by Stephen Reid, 1909
- First appearance: Measure for Measure; c. 1603–04
- Created by: William Shakespeare
- Based on: Juriste, from Cinthio's Story of Epitia
- Portrayed by: Carlo Tamberlani; Tim Pigott-Smith; Mark Leonard Winter

In-universe information
- Occupation: Deputy to the Duke of Vienna
- Family: Vincentio, Duke of Vienna (cousin)
- Spouse: Mariana (married by the end of the play)
- Religion: Catholic
- Nationality: Austrian

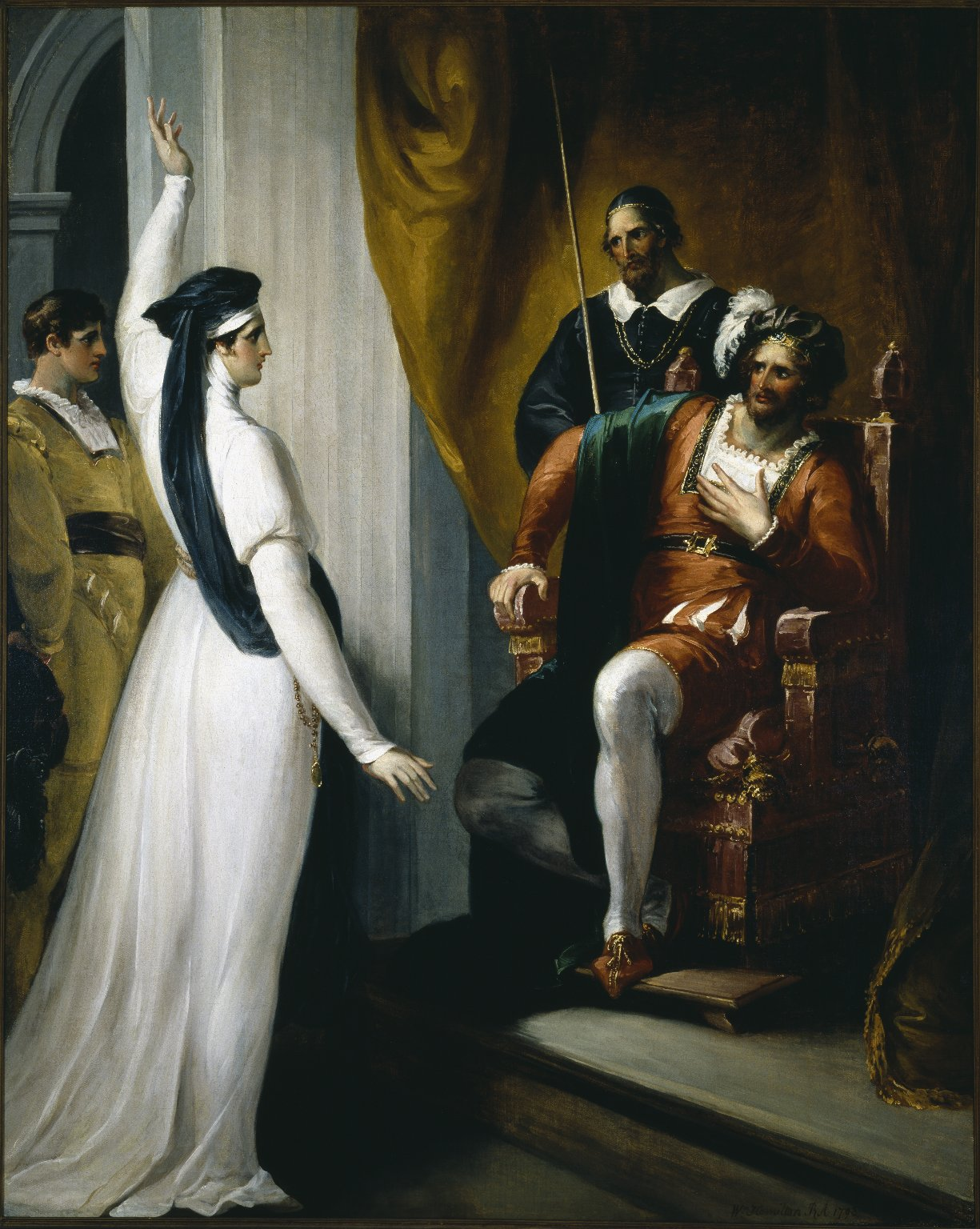
Isabella appealing to Angelo (William Hamilton, 1793).

Angelo is a character in Shakespeare's play Measure for Measure. He is the play's main antagonist.

== Role in the play ==
Angelo is the deputy to the Duke of Vienna, Vincentio. Vincentio begins the play by departing the city under mysterious circumstances and leaving the strait-laced Angelo in power. Angelo's first act is to begin the enforcement of an old law that makes fornication punishable by death. He proves himself a hypocrite when Isabella, the sister of Claudio (the first man sentenced under the law), comes to plead for her brother's life. Angelo agrees to rescind the sentence only if she will sleep with him. Angelo is ultimately duped by being set up with Mariana, a woman he was once betrothed to, who masquerades as Isabella at the assignation. After Angelo thinks he has attained the object of his desire, he covers his tracks by ordering the execution of Claudio after all. Before the scheme is revealed to him, he admits his angst over his behaviour:

"This deed unshapes me quite, makes me unpregnant
And dull to all proceedings. A deflower'd maid!
And by an eminent body that enforced
The law against it! But that her tender shame
Will not proclaim against her maiden loss,
How might she tongue me! Yet reason dares her no;
For my authority bears of a credent bulk,
That no particular scandal once can touch
But it confounds the breather. He should have lived,
Save that riotous youth, with dangerous sense,
Might in the times to come have ta'en revenge,
By so receiving a dishonour'd life
With ransom of such shame. Would yet he had lived!
A lack, when once our grace we have forgot,
Nothing goes right: we would, and we would not."

== Character analysis ==
Angelo is often highlighted as a controversial character who makes readers consider the relationship between justice and mercy. There is much debate about what Shakespeare intended this character to portray. Critics disagree about whether Angelo is a good man who has fallen because of power and sexual temptation or a malicious man from the start. Regardless, he is the personification of justice in the play. When juxtaposed against Isabella (mercy), Angelo represents adherence to the law and punishment for sin, though he does not always adhere to the strict justice he enforces. Once Angelo meets Isabella he is forced to consider himself in a different light and acknowledge his shortcomings. Measure for Measure is considered one of Shakespeare's problem plays because it deviates from the traditional comedy. Angelo's character is a major reason for this classification because Shakespeare created him with tragic qualities, but framed his character within a comedy.

== Performances ==
Measure for Measure was rarely performed until Samuel Phelps played Duke Vincentio at the Sadler's Wells Theatre in the 1840s. The play proved to be more popular with audiences in the twentieth century, with Angelo being the most attractive role for actors. The most famous performance of the role was by John Gielgud in Peter Brook's legendary 1950 production at the Shakespeare Memorial Theatre. Other actors who have distinguished themselves in the role of Angelo include Charles Laughton, Ian Richardson, Brian Bedford, and John Cazale.
