= Measure for Measure =

Play by Shakespeare (1604)

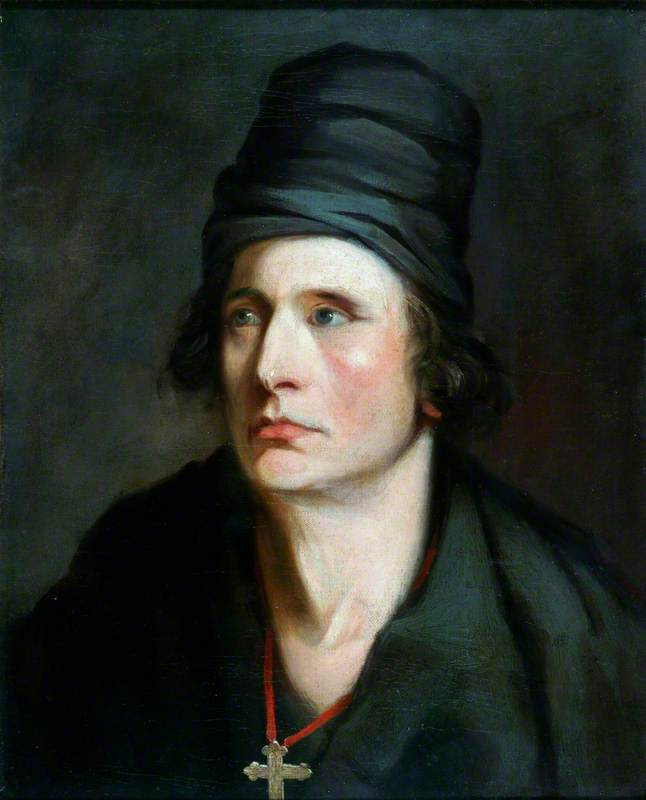
John Philip Kemble as Vincentio in the 1794 rendition of Measure for Measure

Measure for Measure is a play by William Shakespeare, believed to have been written in 1603 or 1604 and first performed in 1604. It was published in the First Folio of 1623.

The play centres on the despotic and puritanical Angelo, a deputy entrusted to rule the city of Vienna in the absence of Duke Vincentio. Vincentio has not actually left the city, but disguised himself as a humble friar to observe Angelo's regency and his citizens' lives. Angelo persecutes a young man, Claudio, for the crime of fornication, sentencing him to death on a technicality. Angelo then attempts to exploit Claudio's sister Isabella, a chaste and innocent nun, when she comes to plead for her brother's life.

Measure for Measure was printed as a comedy in the First Folio and continues to be classified as one. Though it shares features with other Shakespearean comedies, such as word play, irony, disguise and substitution as plot devices, it also features tragic elements such as executions and soliloquies, with Claudio's speech "Ay, but to die, and go we know not where..." in particular having been favourably compared to those of tragic heroes like Prince Hamlet. Because of this ambiguous tone, it is often cited as one of Shakespeare's problem plays.

== Characters ==
- Vincentio – the Duke of Vienna, who also appears disguised as Friar Lodowick
- Angelo – the Duke's deputy, who rules in the Duke's absence
- Mariana – Angelo's ex-lover
- Escalus – an ancient lord working under Angelo
- A Justice – friend of Escalus
- The Provost – runs the prison
- Abhorson – the executioner
- Barnardine – a prisoner
- Claudio – a young man imprisoned for impregnating a woman out of wedlock
- Juliet – Claudio's lover, pregnant with their child
- Isabella – Claudio's sister and a novice nun
- Francisca – a nun
- Mistress Overdone – the manager of a brothel
- Pompey – a pimp
- Lucio – a "fantastic"
- Two gentleman – friends of Lucio
- Froth – a foolish gentleman
- Elbow – a simple constable
- Thomas – a friar
- Peter – a friar
- Varrius (silent) – friend of the Duke

== Synopsis and themes ==
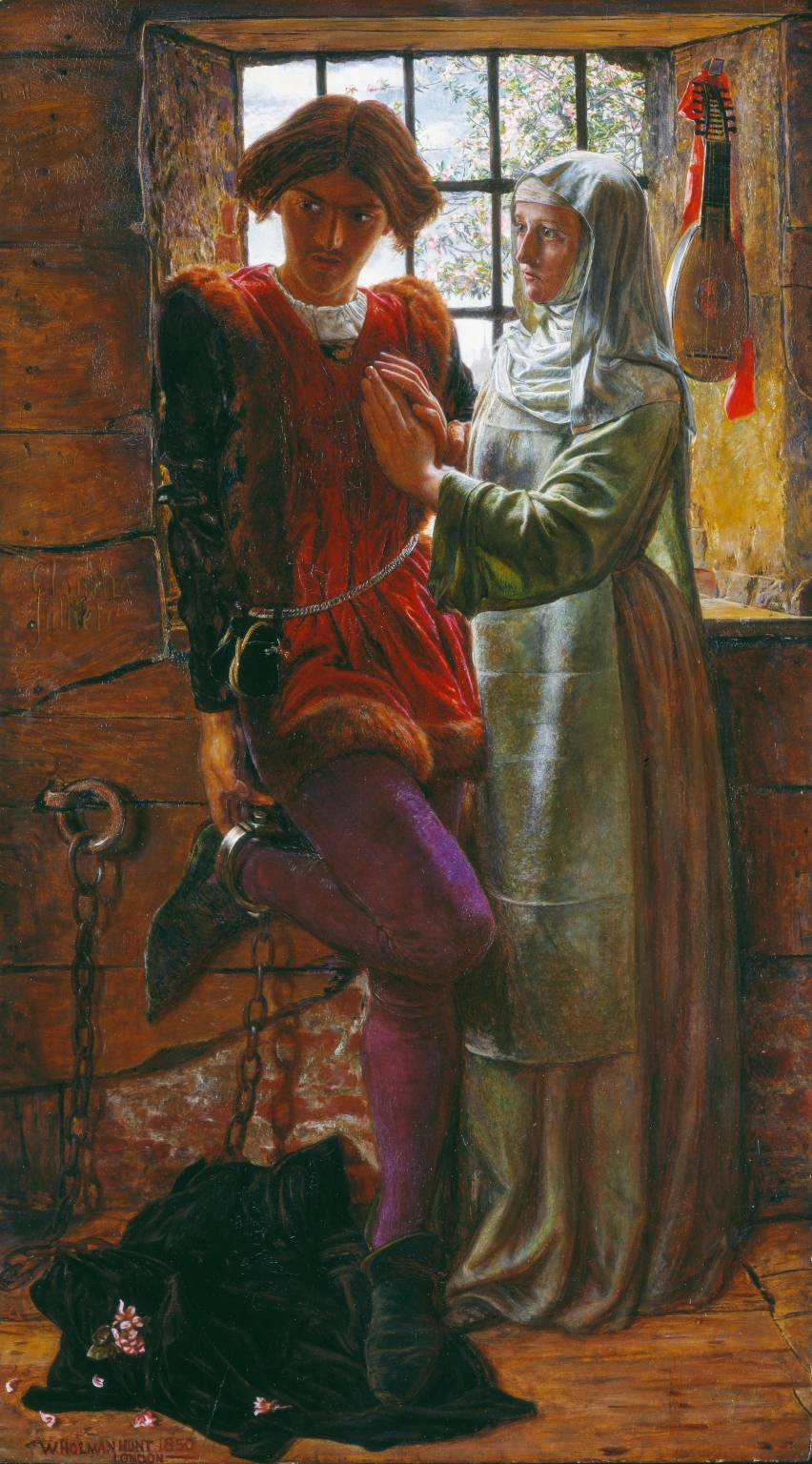
Claudio and Isabella (1850) by William Holman Hunt

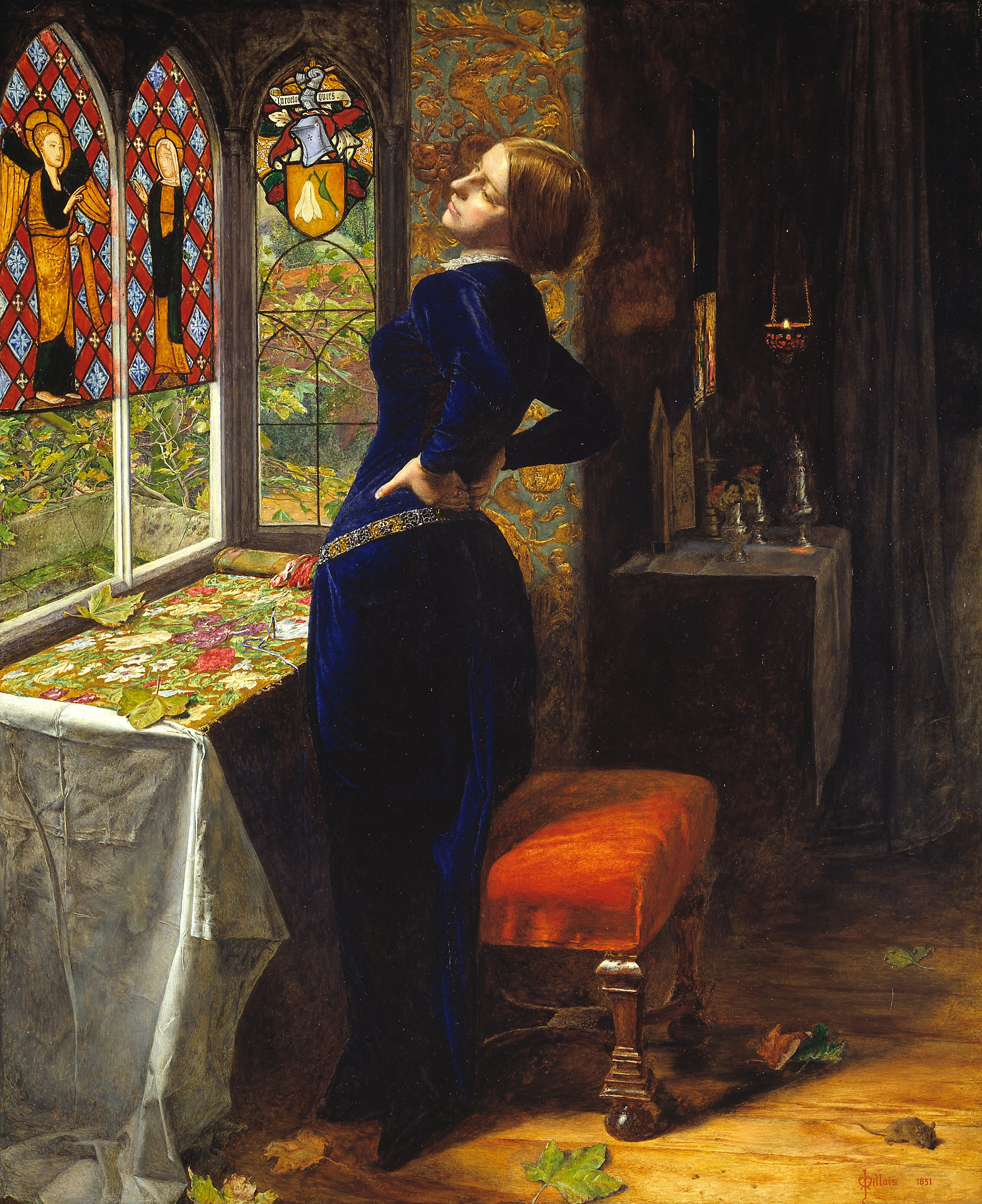
Mariana (1851) by John Everett Millais

Vincentio, the Duke of Vienna, must leave the city on a diplomatic mission. He instates a strict judge, Angelo, to act as his deputy until he returns.

Lucio and a group of soldiers banter about religion, prostitution, and venereal disease as they walk along a Viennese street, hopeful that they will soon find work when war breaks out with Hungary. Mistress Overdone, the operator of a nearby brothel, interjects to scold them for their flippant talk. She compares their behaviour to that of the relatively upstanding Claudio who is, she tells them, soon to be executed for the crime of sleeping with a woman out of wedlock. One of the gentlemen, Claudio's friend Lucio, a "fantastic", is astonished at this news and rushes off. Pompey Bum, an employee of Mistress Overdone, enters as he leaves, bringing more distressing news: Angelo has issued a proclamation that all the brothels in the suburbs are to be torn down.

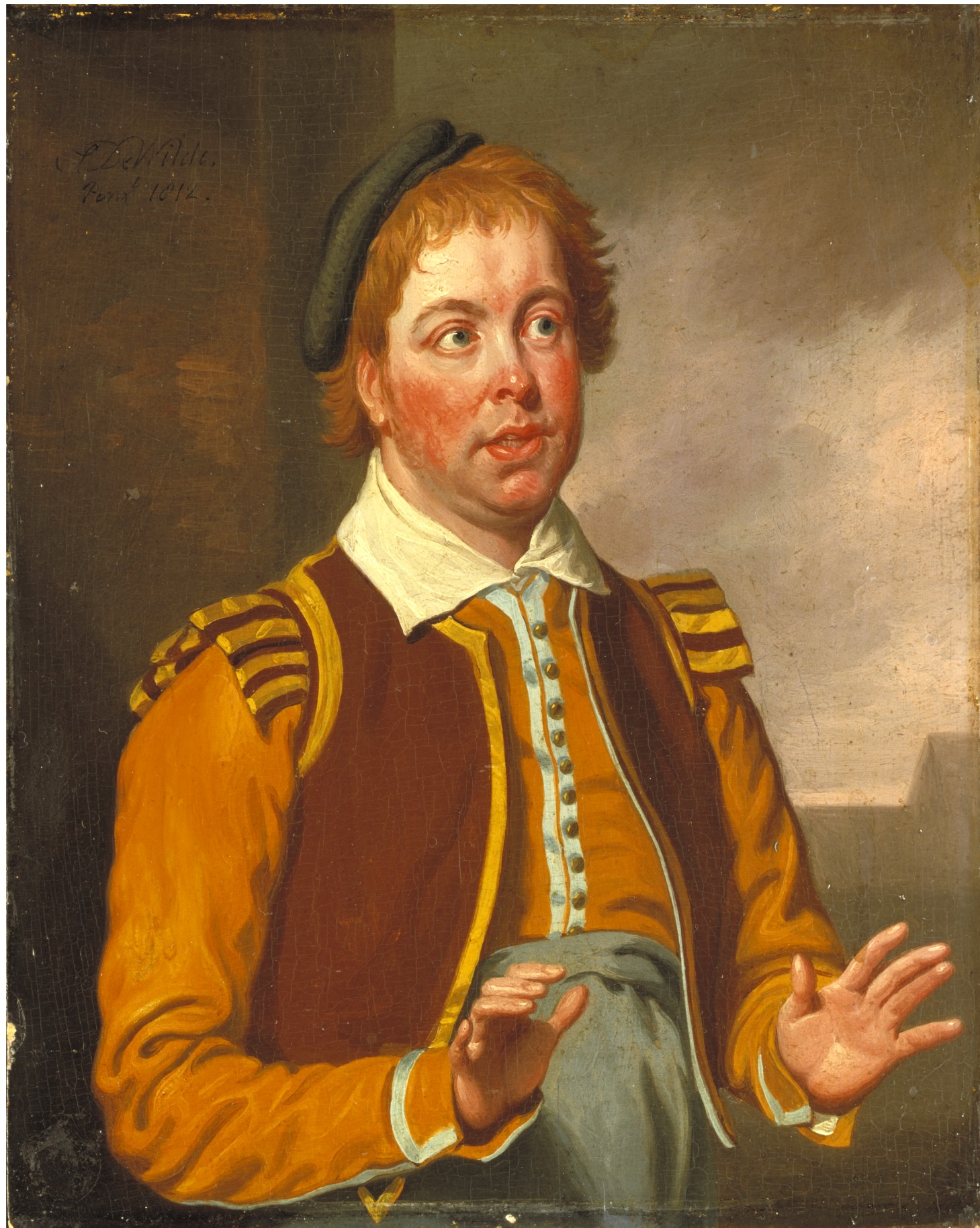
Pompey Bum, as he was portrayed by nineteenth-century actor John Liston

The Provost leads Claudio past Pompey and Overdone as they speak, and explains to Lucio what has happened to him. Claudio was engaged to be married to his lover, Juliet, but, as they had not yet completed the legal technicalities, they were still considered unmarried when Juliet became pregnant by him. As the interim ruler of the city, Angelo has enforced laws that Vincentio had let slide, including an outdated legal clause stating that fornication is punishable by death. Hearing this, Lucio leaves to visit Claudio's sister Isabella, a novice nun, and asks her to intercede with Angelo on Claudio's behalf.

Isabella quickly obtains an audience with Angelo, and pleads for mercy on Claudio's behalf. As they exchange arguments, Angelo is increasingly overcome by desire for Isabella, and eventually offers her a deal: he will spare Claudio's life if Isabella yields to him her virginity. Isabella refuses and threatens to publicly expose his lechery, but he points out that no one would believe her given his reputation. She leaves to visit Claudio in prison, and counsels him to prepare himself for death. Claudio desperately begs Isabella to save his life, but Isabella, though torn, ultimately repeats her refusal to yield to Angelo, on the grounds that it would be wrong for her to sacrifice her own immortal soul (and that of Claudio, if his entreaties were responsible for her loss of her virtue) to save Claudio's transient earthly life.

=== Subterfuge ===
Vincentio, meanwhile, has not truly left the city. Instead, he has disguised himself as a friar named Lodowick, wanting to secretly view the city's affairs and the effects of Angelo's temporary rule. In his guise as a friar, he befriends Isabella and arranges two tricks with her to thwart Angelo's intentions:

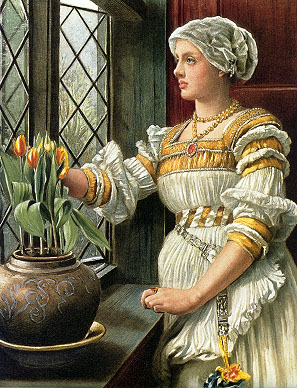
Mariana (1888) by Valentine Cameron Prinsep

1. First, a "bed trick" is arranged. Angelo has previously refused to fulfill a betrothal binding him to the lady Mariana, despite her love for him, because her dowry was lost at sea. Isabella comes to an agreement with Mariana, then sends word to Angelo that she has decided to submit to him with the condition that their meeting occur in darkness and silence. Mariana takes Isabella's place and has sex with Angelo, who believes she is Isabella. On some interpretations of the law, this constitutes consummation of their betrothal, and therefore their marriage; notably, this interpretation would also make Claudio's and Juliet's marriage legal.
2. After having sex with Mariana (believing her to be Isabella), Angelo goes back on his word. He sends a message to the prison that he wishes to see Claudio beheaded, necessitating the "head trick". Vincentio attempts to arrange the execution of another prisoner whose head could be sent in place of Claudio's. But the dissolute criminal Barnardine refuses to be executed in his drunken state. Instead, the head of Ragozine the pirate is sent to Angelo; Ragozine recently died of a fever, and was of similar appearance to Claudio.

=== Resolution ===
The plot comes to a climax with Vincentio's "return" to Vienna. Isabella and Mariana publicly petition him, and he hears their claims against Angelo, which Angelo smoothly denies. As the scene develops, it appears that Friar Lodowick will be blamed for the accusations levelled against Angelo. Vincentio leaves Angelo to judge the cause against Lodowick, returning in his disguise when Lodowick is summoned moments later. When Angelo attempts to seal the case against Lodowick, Vincentio reveals himself, exposing Angelo as a liar and confirming Isabella's and Mariana's allegations. He proposes that Angelo be executed, but first compels him to marry Mariana, so that his estate may go to Mariana as compensation for her lost dowry.

Mariana pleads for Angelo's life, even enlisting the aid of Isabella (who is not yet aware her brother Claudio is still alive). Vincentio pretends not to heed the women's petition until he reveals that Claudio has not, in fact, been executed, at which point he relents. He then proposes marriage to Isabella. Isabella does not reply. For Shakespeare's audiences, silence would have been interpreted as an unequivocal "yes", meaning that additional dialogue was unnecessary. This is one of the "open silences" of the play, and has been variously interpreted in different adaptations.

A subplot concerns Lucio, who frequently slanders the duke to the friar, and in the last act slanders the friar to the duke, providing opportunities for comic consternation on Vincentio's part and landing Lucio in trouble when it is revealed that the duke and the friar are one and the same. Lucio's punishment is to be forced to marry Kate Keepdown, a prostitute he impregnated and abandoned.

=== Analysis ===
The play's main themes include justice, "morality and mercy in Vienna", and the dichotomy between corruption and purity: "some rise by sin, and some by virtue fall". Mercy and virtue prevail, as the play does not end tragically, with virtues such as compassion and forgiveness exercised at its end. While the play focuses on justice overall, the final scene illustrates that Shakespeare intended for moral justice to temper strict civil justice: several of the characters receive understanding and leniency instead of the harsh punishment to which they, according to the law, could have been sentenced.

Vincentio's reappearance is considered an early use of the deus ex machina in English literature.

== Source texts ==
The play draws on two distinct sources. The original is "The Story of Epitia", from Cinthio's Gli Hecatommithi, first published in 1565. Shakespeare was familiar with this book; it contains the original source for his Othello. Cinthio also published the story with some small differences as a play, of which Shakespeare may have been aware. The original story is an unmitigated tragedy: Isabella's counterpart is forced to sleep with Angelo's counterpart, and her brother is killed.

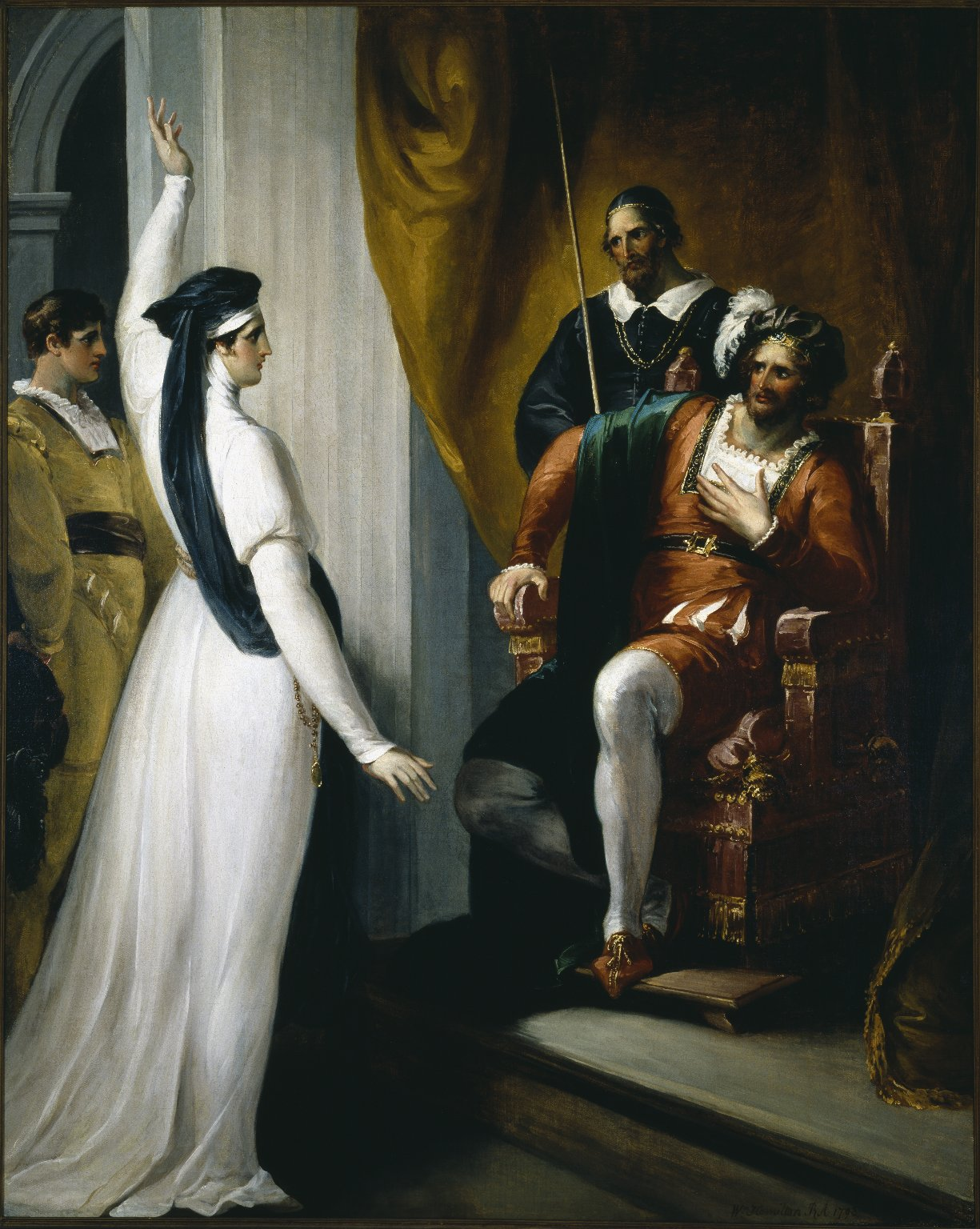
A 1793 painting by William Hamilton of Isabella appealing to Angelo

The play's other main source is George Whetstone's 1578 two-part closet drama Promos and Cassandra, itself sourced from Cinthio. Whetstone adapted Cinthio's story by adding the comic elements and the bed and head tricks.

The title of the play appears as a line of dialogue:

An Angelo for Claudio, death for death:
Haste still paies haste, and leasure, answers leasure;
Like doth quit like, and Measure still for Measure:

— William Shakespeare, Measure for Measure, act V, scene i

This is generally understood to be a reference to the Sermon on the Mount in Matthew 7:

For in the same way you judge others, you will be judged, and with the measure you use, it will be measured to you.

— Gospel of Matthew, Chapter 7, Verse 2

Peter Meilaender has argued that Measure for Measure is largely based on biblical references, focusing on the themes of sin, restraint, mercy, and rebirth. Amongst such Gospel comparisons, the Gospel of Matthew has been viewed as a source.

A 2016 essay by the literary critic Giuseppe Leone analyses parallels between the episode of Claudio's supposed beheading and that of John the Baptist, as narrated in Matthew 14:1–12. Leone argues that in Shakespeare's treatment of the perpetrator's demand for Claudio's head there is an expression of Angelo's pleasure in his power to have his will enacted, and to reap satisfaction from that power through the tangible token: he orders the severed head be brought "for my better satisfaction". The demand for the Baptist's head from Herodias, through her daughter, fulfils a similar function. Herod Antipas' public oath of providing Herodias' daughter with whatever she demanded ensured the Baptist's execution, without necessitating the production of his remains. In Leone's view, his stepdaughter's demand, "Give me here John Baptist's head on a platter", serves the same purpose of allowing for self-satisfied gloating in power over others. Neither Cinthio's nor Whetstone's source text has anything similar. The executed victim in those works is ordered to be sent to the sister, without either of the perpetrators, Iuriste and Promos, showing any interest in obtaining or viewing the remains. Their satisfaction comes solely from their sister's mistreatment. For Leone, this divergence from Measure's literary precursors and concurrence with the Gospel text is a strong case for Matthew's Gospel as a source.

== Date, text and authorship ==
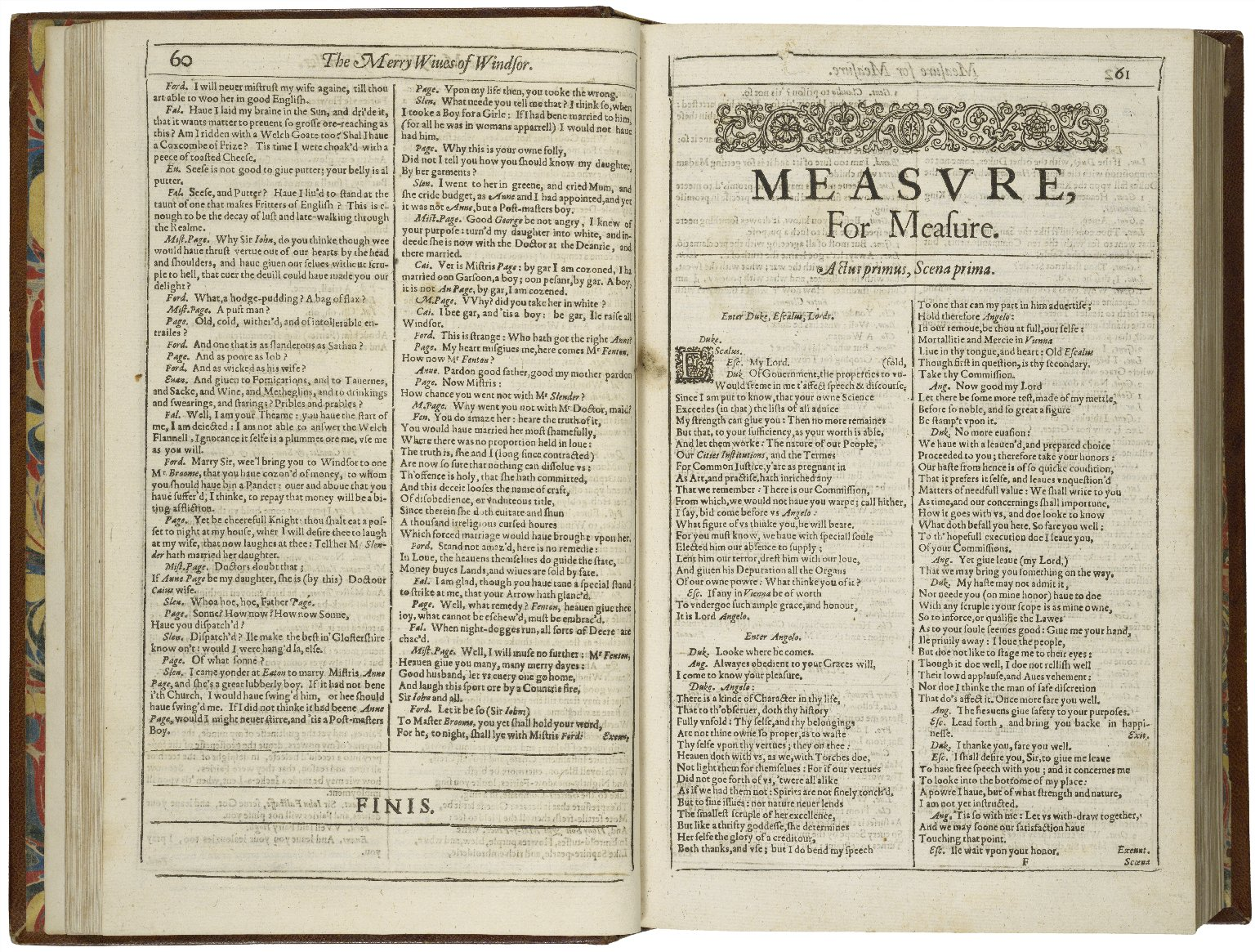
The first page of Shakespeare's Measure for Measure, printed in the First Folio of 1623

Measure for Measure is believed to have been written in 1603 or 1604. The play was first published in 1623 in the First Folio.

In their book Shakespeare Reshaped, 1606–1623, Gary Taylor and John Jowett argue that part of the text of Measure that survives is not in its original form, but rather the product of a revision by Thomas Middleton after Shakespeare's death. They present stylistic evidence that patches of writing are by Middleton, and argue that Middleton changed the setting to Vienna from the original Italy. Braunmuller and Watson say their suggestion should be seen as "an intriguing hypothesis rather than a fully proven attribution". David Bevington suggests an alternate theory: that the text can be stylistically credited to the professional scrivener Ralph Crane, who is usually credited for some of the better and unchanged texts in the Folio, including The Tempest.

It is generally accepted that a garbled sentence during the Duke's opening speech (lines 8–9 in most editions) represents a place where a line has been lost, possibly due to a printer's error. Because the folio is the only source, the line cannot be recovered.

== Performance history ==
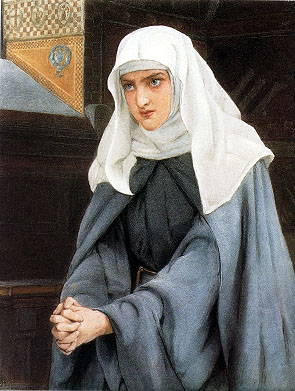
Isabella (1888) by Francis William Topham

The earliest recorded performance of Measure for Measure took place on St. Stephen's night, 26 December 1604.

During the Restoration, Measure was one of many Shakespeare plays adapted to the tastes of a new audience. Sir William Davenant inserted Benedick and Beatrice from Much Ado About Nothing into his adaptation, called The Law Against Lovers. Samuel Pepys saw the hybrid play on 18 February 1662; he describes it in his diary as "a good play, and well performed"; he was especially impressed by the singing and dancing of the young actress who played Viola, Beatrice's sister (Davenant's creation). Davenant rehabilitated Angelo, who is now only testing Isabella's chastity; the play ends with a triple marriage. This, among the earliest of Restoration adaptations, appears not to have succeeded on stage. Charles Gildon returned to Shakespeare's text in a 1699 production at Lincoln's Inn Fields. Gildon's adaptation, entitled Beauty the Best Advocate, removes all of the low-comic characters. Moreover, by making both Angelo and Mariana, and Claudio and Juliet, secretly married, and by removing the scene in which the Duke propositions Isabella, he eliminates almost all of the illicit sexuality that is so central to Shakespeare's play. In addition, he integrates into the play scenes from Henry Purcell's opera Dido and Aeneas, which Angelo watches sporadically throughout the play. Gildon also offers a partly facetious epilogue, spoken by Shakespeare's ghost, who complains of the constant revisions of his work. Like Davenant's, Gildon's version did not gain currency and was not revived. John Rich presented a version closer to Shakespeare's original in 1720.

In late Victorian times, the subject matter of the play was deemed controversial, and there was an outcry when Adelaide Neilson appeared as Isabella in the 1870s. The Oxford University Dramatic Society found it necessary to edit it when staging it in February 1906, with Gervais Rentoul as Angelo and Maud Hoffman as Isabella, and the same text was used when Oscar Asche and Lily Brayton staged it at the Adelphi Theatre in the following month. William Poel produced the play in 1893 at the Royalty and in 1908 at the Gaiety in Manchester, with himself as Angelo. In line with his other Elizabethan performances, these used the uncut text of Shakespeare's original with only minimal alterations. The use of an un-localised stage lacking scenery, and the swift, musical delivery of dramatic speech, set the standard for the rapidity and continuity shown in modern productions. Poel's work also marked the first determined attempt by a producer to give a modern psychological or theological reading of both the characters and the overall message of the play.

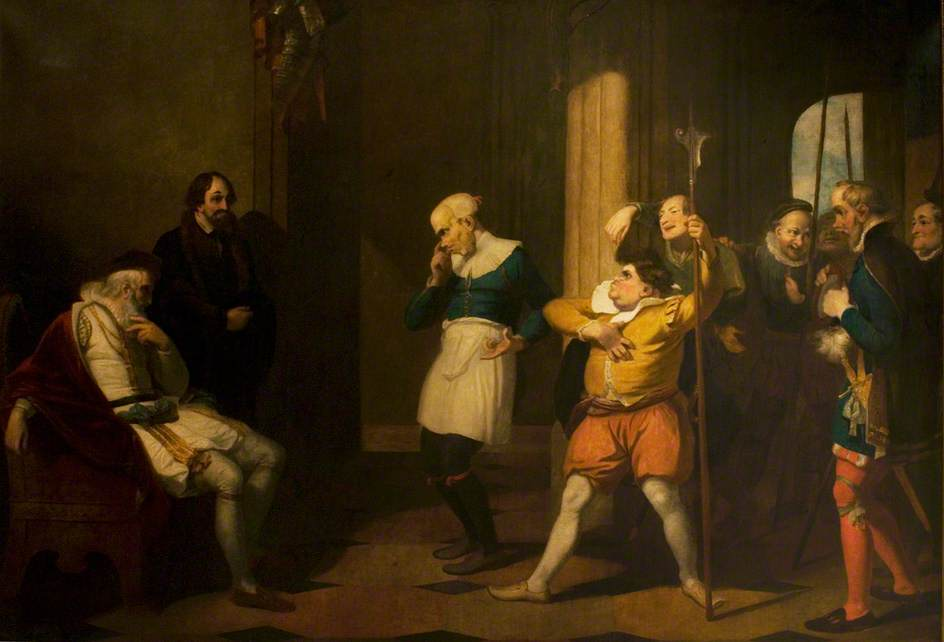
"Measure for Measure" Act II, Scene 1, the Examination of Froth and Clown by Escalus and Justice (from the Boydell series), Robert Smirke (n.d.)

Notable 20th-century productions of Measure for Measure include Charles Laughton as Angelo at the Old Vic Theatre in 1933, and Peter Brook's 1950 staging at the Shakespeare Memorial Theatre with John Gielgud as Angelo and Barbara Jefford as Isabella. In 1957 John Houseman and Jack Landau directed a production at the Phoenix Theatre in New York City that starred Nina Foch and Richard Waring (Jerry Stiller appeared in the minor role of Barnardine). In 1962, the Royal Shakespeare Company staged a production directed by John Blatchley starring Marius Goring as Angelo and Judi Dench as Isabella. The play has only once been produced on Broadway, in a 1973 production also directed by Houseman that featured David Ogden Stiers as Vincentio, Kevin Kline in the small role of Friar Peter, and Patti Lupone in two small roles. In 1976, a New York Shakespeare Festival production featured Sam Waterston as the Duke, Meryl Streep as Isabella, John Cazale as Angelo, Lenny Baker as Lucio, Jeffrey Tambor as Elbow, and Judith Light as Francisca. In 1981, director Michael Rudman presented a version with an all-black cast at London's National Theatre. Rudman restaged his concept at the New York Shakespeare Festival in 1993, starring Kevin Kline as the Duke, André Braugher as Angelo, and Lisa Gay Hamilton as Isabella.

In 2013, Robert Falls directed a version at Chicago's Goodman Theatre set in seedy 1970s Times Square, New York. It was available for streaming in April to May 2021. Between 2013 and 2017, the theatre company Cheek by Jowl staged a Russian-language version of the play in association with the Pushkin Theatre, Moscow, and the Barbican Centre, London. It was directed by Declan Donnellan and designed by Nick Ormerod. In 2018, Josie Rourke directed a gender-reversal production at the Donmar Warehouse in London, in which Jack Lowden and Hayley Atwell alternated in the roles of Angelo and Isabella. In 2025, the Royal Shakespeare Company's production directed by Emily Burns, with Isis Hainsworth as Isabella, Adam James as the Duke, Oli Higginson as Claudio, and Tom Mothersdale as Angelo, dispensed with the comic subplots, one glowing review noting its underlining of Measure for Measure's contemporary political relevance.

== Adaptations and cultural references ==
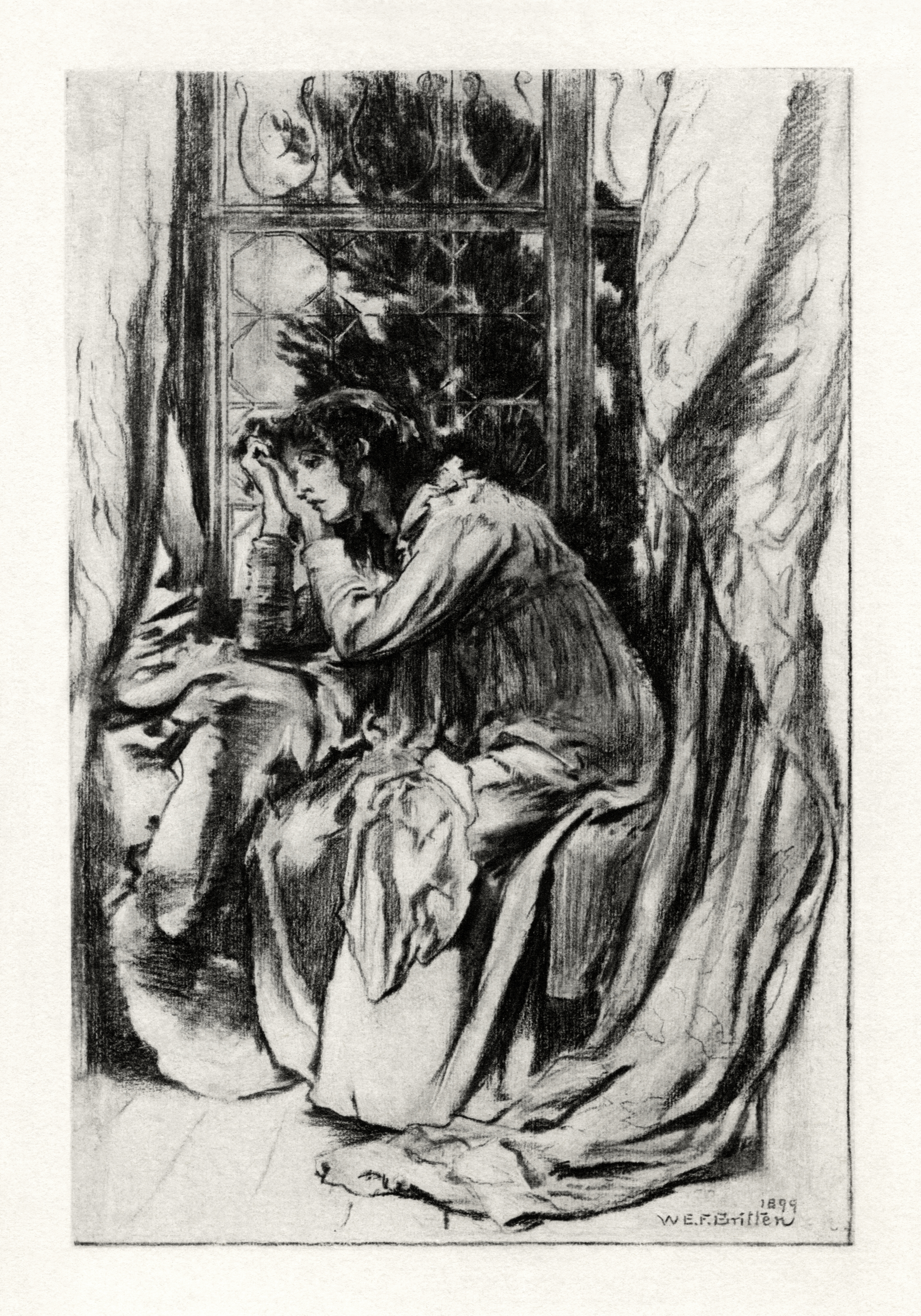
1899 illustration by W. E. F. Britten for Tennyson's "Mariana"

=== Film adaptations ===
- The 1979 BBC version, shot on videotape and directed by Desmond Davis, is generally considered a faithful rendition of the play. Kate Nelligan plays Isabella, Tim Pigott-Smith plays Angelo and Kenneth Colley plays the Duke. It was shown on PBS in the United States as part of the BBC Television Shakespeare series.
- A 1994 TV adaptation was set in the present day, and starred Tom Wilkinson, Corin Redgrave and Juliet Aubrey.
- In a 2006 version directed by Bob Komar the play is set in the British Army in the present day. It starred Josephine Rogers as Isabella, Daniel Roberts as Angelo, and Simon Phillips as the Duke.
- The 2015 film M4M: Measure for Measure recontextualises Isabella's character by changing her gender from female to male, making this version the first to incorporate homosexual interactions.
- A 2019 Australian feature film adaptation, directed by Paul Ireland, is set in contemporary Melbourne.

=== Radio adaptations ===
- In 1950, Peter Brook directed a BBC Home Service birthday tribute to Shakespeare with John Gielgud as Angelo, Leon Quartermaine as Lucio, Harry Andrews as Vincentio, Barbara Jefford as Isabella, and Robert Hardy as narrator.
- In 1951, AE A Harding arranged and produced a BBC Third Programme version, with Stephen Murray as Angelo, Dennis Arundell as Lucio, Laidman Browne as Vincentio, Claire Bloom as Isabella.
- In 1955, Raymond Raikes adapted and produced a BBC Third Programme version with Michael Hordern as Angelo, Heron Carvic as Lucio, Deryck Guyler as Vincentio, Hermione Hannen as Isabella, and John Gabriel as narrator. An off-air recording exists.
- In 1964, Raymond Raikes adapted and produced a BBC Third Programme version with William Squire as Angelo, David March as Lucio, Anthony Nicholls as Vincentio, and Barbara Jefford as Isabella.
- In 1976, Jane Morgan produced a BBC Radio 3 version with Philip Bond as Angelo, Norman Rodway as Lucio, Michael Gough as Vincentio, and Marian Diamond as Isabella.
- In 1994, Peter Kavanagh adapted and directed a BBC Radio 3 version with John Shrapnel as Angelo, Simon Russell Beale as Lucio, Ronald Pickup as Vincentio, and Saskia Reeves as Isabella.
- In 2004, BBC Radio 3's Drama on 3 broadcast a production directed by Claire Grove, with Chiwetel Ejiofor as The Duke, Nadine Marshall as Isabella, Anton Lesser as Angelo, Adjoa Andoh as Mariana, Jude Akuwudike as Claudio, Colin McFarlane as the Provost, and Claire Benedict as Mistress Overdone.
- On 29 April 2018, BBC Radio 3's Drama on 3 broadcast a new production directed by Gaynor Macfarlane, with Paul Higgins as The Duke, Nicola Ferguson as Isabella, Robert Jack as Angelo, Maureen Beattie as Escalus, Finn den Hertog as Lucio/Froth, Michael Nardone as the Provost, Maggie Service as Mariana, Owen Whitelaw as Claudio/Friar Peter, Sandy Grierson as Pompey, and Georgie Glen as Mistress Overdone/Francisca.

=== Musical adaptations ===
- Richard Wagner's opera Das Liebesverbot, with the libretto by the composer
- The musical Desperate Measures (2004), with book and lyrics by Peter Kellogg and music by David Friedman

=== In popular culture ===
- The character of Mariana inspired Tennyson's poem "Mariana" (1830).
- Alexander Pushkin used the play's plot in his poetic tale Angelo (1833). He had begun to translate the play, but arrived at a generally non-dramatic tale with some dialogue.
- Joyce Carol Oates's short story "In the Region of Ice" contains the dialogue between Claudio and his sister and parallels the same plea with the student, Allen Weinstein, and his teacher, Sister Irene.
- Bertolt Brecht's play Round Heads and Pointed Heads was originally an adaptation of Measure for Measure.
- Thomas Pynchon's early short story "Mortality and Mercy in Vienna" was inspired by this play and takes its title from a verse in it.
- In Aldous Huxley's novel Eyeless in Gaza, Mr Beavis expresses a "tingling warmth" he feels while listening to Mrs Foxe reading the last scene of Measure for Measure.
- The title of Huxley's 1948 novel Ape and Essence comes from a line spoken by Isabella, act 2 scene 2: "His glassy essence, like an angry ape".
- Lauren Willig's 2011 novel Two L is based on Measure for Measure.
