= The Skivvies =

American singers

The Skivvies are Nick Cearley and Lauren Molina, American singer/musician/actors, who perform "stripped down" arrangements of popular songs, and original tunes while stripping down to their underwear. They have had residencies at several venues including 54 Below, 42 West, Highline Ballroom and Joe's Pub. They have reviews from established publishers in The Wall Street Journal, The New York Times, People, Playbill, Theatermania, OUT Magazine, The New York Post and Sports Illustrated.

The duo come from a background of musical theatre, Molina having performed on Broadway in Sweeney Todd and Rock of Ages; Cearley having performed in the 1st National Tour of All Shook Up. They have been cast in shows together, off-Broadway in Sex Tips for Straight Women from a Gay Man; and as Brad and Janet in The Rocky Horror Show at Bucks County Playhouse, directed by Hunter Foster. They have made appearances in pilots for FOX, A&E and WE, as well as performing at fundraising events, such as Broadway Bares (Broadway Cares/Equity Fights AIDS). Notable guest performers include Laura Benanti, Lena Hall, Nick Adams, Nick Wyman, Randy Harrison, Lesli Margherita, Alison Fraser, Claybourne Elder, Ariana DeBose, Phillipa Soo, Tom Hewitt, Will Swenson, Norm Lewis, Alice Ripley, Drew Lachey, Keala Settle and Lin-Manuel Miranda.
