= Lencia Kebede =

American stage actress and singer

- Born: October 3, 1993 (age 32); Los Angeles, California, U.S.
- Education: Occidental College
- Occupation: Musical theater actress
- Years active: 2016–present
- Known for: Wicked

Lencia Kebede (born October 3, 1993) is an American actress and singer. She is best known for becoming the first Black actress to play Elphaba full-time in Wicked on Broadway.

== Early life ==
Kebede was born in Los Angeles, California to an Ethiopian American family. She grew up performing in church choir and community theatre programs.

Kebede attended Occidental College, double-majoring in Diplomacy & World Affairs and politics. She participated in the college's Glee Club, as well as its theater and music departments. While pursuing her bachelor's degree, Kebede spent a semester interning at the United Nations headquarters in New York City, where she attended General Assembly meetings and took notes for the Guatemala ambassador. She also has been playing soccer and basketball all her life.

== Career ==
Upon graduation, Kebede decided to pursue professional theatre. Her first few jobs included a stint at Tokyo Disneyland and the role of Joanne Jefferson in the 20th anniversary tour of Rent.

Kebede joined the national tour of Hamilton in 2019 as an ensemble member. In 2023, she began performing as Angelica Schuyler, a role she played for two years.

On March 4, 2025, Kebede made her Broadway debut as Elphaba in Wicked. Kebede is the first Black actress to play the role full-time in the 21-year-old Broadway production. She performed alongside Allie Trimm as Glinda. Kebede played her final performance as Elphaba on March 1, 2026. She has returned to Broadway in Hamilton, reprising her role as Angelica Schuyler.

== Theatre ==
| Year | Title | Role | Venue | Category | Notes | Ref. |
|---|---|---|---|---|---|---|
| 2018–19 | Rent | Joanne Jefferson | | 20th anniversary non-Equity tour | Replacement | |
| 2019–23 | Hamilton | Ensemble | | U.S. National Tour (Angelica company) | | |
| 2023–25, 2026 | Hamilton | Angelica Schuyler | | U.S. National Tour (Philip company), and Broadway at the Richard Rodgers Theatre | Replacement | |
| 2025-26 | Wicked | Elphaba | Gershwin Theatre | Original Broadway production | Replacement | |
