= Taylor Bright =

American singer-songwriter (born 1993)

- Born: 1993 (age 32–33)
- Occupations: Singer, songwriter, actress
- Notable work: "Striped Socks"
- Style: Pop
- Website: www.taylorbright.com

Taylor Bright (born 1993) is an American musical artist, songwriter and actress, who gained attention through a viral online video she released while still in high school for her song "Striped Socks".

The song was remixed and landed on the Billboard chart for Dance Club music. Bright continued to pursue music and acting while attending Brown University.

Bright grew up in Philadelphia, and has been involved in various performing arts. Bright began performing on stage and earned a role in the 30th Anniversary National Tour of Annie at the age of 12.

Once she began performing, Bright developed an interest in making pop music and wrote her first song at the age of 10. Bright's homemade video for "Striped Socks" garnered her international attention at the age of 15.

Bright was then contacted by DJ Mike Rizzo, who remixed the song. Rizzo's version appeared on the Billboard Dance Club Songs, peaking at position 29, and spent 11 weeks on the chart. In 2011, she released the EP MixTape Love, produced by Robopop. A video was produced for the song "Psycho" off of that EP.

Bright pursued music and acting in Los Angeles while continuing her studies.

== Awards and honors ==
Bright was nominated for the 2011 Grammy Award for Best Spoken Word Album for Children along with the other contributors to the 2010 album Healthy Food For Thought: Good Enough To Eat.

In 2010, Bright received an ASCAP Young Songwriter Award.

== Credits ==
- Annie Warbucks - Walnut Street Theatre (2004)
- 30th Anniversary Tour of Annie - National (2005)
- American Girl Circle of Friends - New York (2006)
- Carousel - Walnut Street Theatre (2006)
- 13 The Musical - Goodspeed Theatre (2008)
- Camplified (2009, 2011)
