= Allie Trimm =

American actress and singer

- Education: Stanford University
- Occupations: Actress; singer
- Years active: 2004–present
- Known for: 13; Wicked

Allie Trimm is an American actress and singer. She originated the role of Patrice in the musical 13 on Broadway. Her other work on the Broadway stage includes playing Glinda in Wicked.

== Early life ==
Trimm grew up in San Diego, California. At age nine, she began performing in professional theatre.

== Career ==
As a teenager, Trimm made her Broadway debut in Jason Robert Brown's 13, originating the role of Patrice. Afterwards, she performed as Kim MacAfee in the Broadway revival of Bye Bye Birdie.

In 2010, Trimm read for the part of Hannah in two public staged readings of the musical Allegiance. Two years later, she reprised that role in the musical's world premiere at the Old Globe Theatre in San Diego. She was replaced by Katie Rose Clarke in the show's move to Broadway. Trimm then attended Stanford University before taking an absence of leave to return to the stage as Éponine in the Lamb's Players Theatre's production of Les Misérables.

Prior to the COVID-19 pandemic, Trimm was set to premiere the role of Little Mermaid in the Broadway-bound production of Once Upon a One More Time, a jukebox musical featuring music by Britney Spears.

On December 15, 2021, Trimm became the standby for the role of Glinda in the Broadway production of Wicked, making her debut in the role on December 25, 2021. She left the production on March 31, 2024, before returning on March 4, 2025, this time playing Glinda full-time alongside Lencia Kebede as Elphaba. Trimm played her final performance as Glinda on March 1, 2026.

== Acting credits ==
=== Theatre ===
==== Broadway ====
Year	Title	Role	Venue	Category	Notes	Ref.
2008-09	13	Patrice	Bernard B. Jacobs Theatre	Original Broadway production	Original cast	
2009-10	Bye Bye Birdie	Kim McAfee	Henry Miller Theatre	Broadway revival	Original cast	
2021–24	Wicked	Standby for Glinda	Gershwin Theatre	Original; Broadway production	Replacement	
2025-26	Wicked	Glinda	Gershwin Theatre	Original; Broadway production	Replacement	

==== Regional ====
- BAZ – Daisy Buchanan – The Palazzo (2018)
- Les Misérables – Éponine Thénardier – Lambs Players, San Diego (2014)
- Allegiance – Hannah Campbell – Old Globe Theatre (2012)
- Brighton Beach Memoirs — Nora – Old Globe Theatre
- 13 — Patrice – Goodspeed Musicals (2008)
- The Secret Garden – Mary – Lamb's Players Theater, San Diego (2007)
- How the Grinch Stole Christmas the Musical — Ensemble – Old Globe Theatre, San Diego (2006)
- Annie Get Your Gun - Moonlight Stage, San Diego (2007)
- Festival of Christmas — Glory Thornberry – Lamb's Players Theater (2005)
- Will Rogers Follies - Mary Rogers – Moonlight Stage (2005)

==== Readings ====
- Jay Kuo and Lorenzo Thione's Allegiance (2010)
- Georgia Stitt's Water (2009)

=== Film ===
Year	Title	Role	Ref.
2011	Prom	Betsy	
2018	Saints Rest	Allie	
2021	Next Stop, Christmas	Chloe	

=== Television ===
Year	Title	Role	Notes	Ref.
2009	30 Rock	Bethany Baird	Episode: "St. Valentine's Day"	
2011	Private Practice	Jamie	Episode: "The Hardest Part"	
2022	The Marvelous Mrs. Maisel	Minnie	Episode: "Maisel vs. Lennon: The Cut Contest"	
