= Lauren Molina =

American actress (born 1981)

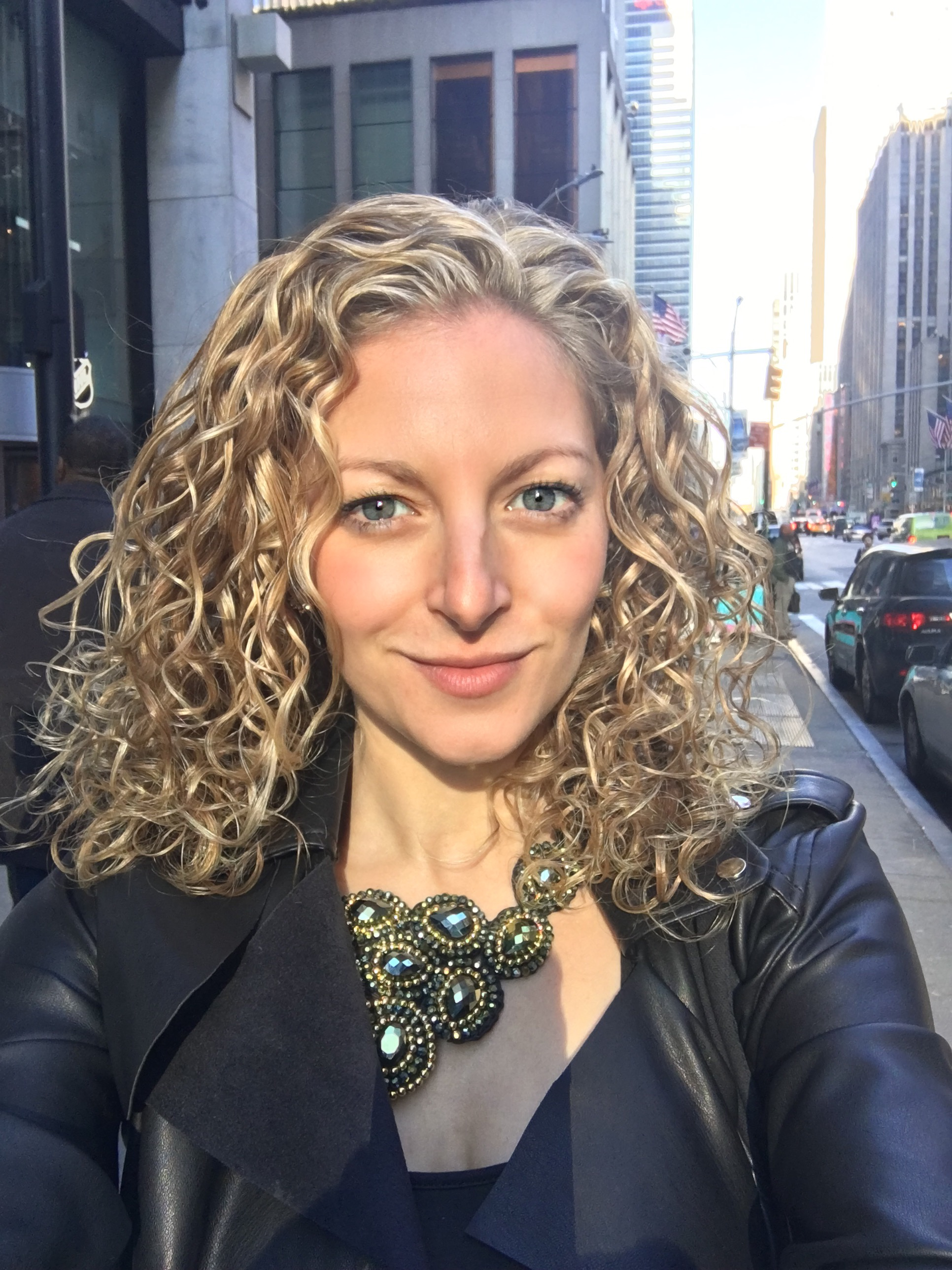
- Molina on Broadway
- Born: April 15, 1981 (age 44); Detroit, Michigan, U.S.
- Education: University of Michigan
- Occupations: Actress; singer; songwriter; musician
- Years active: 2004–present
- Known for: Sweeney Todd; Rock of Ages; The Skivvies

Lauren Molina (born April 15, 1981) is an American actress, singer, songwriter, and musician. She is a co-creator and performer with the comedy-pop, undie-rock band The Skivvies. Her Broadway credits include Johanna in the actor-musician revival of Sweeney Todd. To describe her as an actress, one reviewer said "She's part Mary Martin, Lucille Ball, Kristen Wiig and [fill in the blank with your favorite opera star because Molina has one of the most powerful and flexible voices in the annals of Broadway]." While performing on the first national tour of Sweeney Todd, she received the Independent Reviewers of New England (IRNE) Award for Best Supporting Actress. She won a Helen Hayes award for her portrayal of Cunegunde in Candide (2010-2011), directed by Mary Zimmerman at the Shakespeare Theatre in DC, and received an IRNE nomination for the same role at the Huntington Theatre. She originated the role of Bella Rose in Desperate Measures (2017-2018) Off-Broadway and received nominations for the Lucille Lortel Award for Outstanding Actress in a Musical and Outer Critics Circle for Best Supporting Actress. In 2019, she and her Skivvies partner Nick Cearley co-conceived a new actor-musician revival of "You're a Good Man, Charlie Brown", also playing Lucy and Linus, at the Cincinnati Playhouse in the Park. A Detroit native, Lauren received her BFA from the University of Michigan in musical theatre. She resides in New York City.

== Stage career ==
She made her Broadway debut as Johanna in the 2005 revival of Sweeney Todd, Described as a "sweet-voiced soprano who...plays the cello beautifully" by The New York Times, she received the Independent Reviewers of New England Award Best Supporting Actress, while performing on the first national tour, and was named as one of the "30 Under 30" featured on Broadwayspace.com.

Hilton Als, featured Molina in the "Critic's Notebook" of The New Yorker, saying "Most of the kudos for the current revival of Stephen Sondheim’s 1979 musical, “Sweeney Todd,” have gone to Patti LuPone and Michael Cerveris. But Lauren Molina also deserves her share. Making her Broadway début as Johanna, Sweeney's long-lost daughter, Molina projects such sweet confusion, mental terror, and consistent interiority that she exposes the ways in which seasoned pros like LuPone and Cerveris play to the audience from time to time. Molina is a newcomer—she only recently graduated from college—but she taps into Johanna with an all-consuming honesty and range. Given her unconventional good looks and delicacy of frame, filmmakers in the sixties and seventies like Lumet, Coppola, and others would have snatched Molina up as quickly as they did the late, great Elizabeth Hartman, who conveyed an effect similar to Molina's in “The Group,” “You’re a Big Boy Now,” and “The Beguiled” —that of a highly intelligent actress in love with being someone other than herself."

In 2008, she originated the role of Regina/Candi in the 80's rock musical Rock of Ages off-Broadway at New World Stages. She played the same role on Broadway from April 2009 – August 2010. She won a Helen Hayes Award for the role of Cunegonde in Candide in a 2010–11 production that was newly adapted and directed by Mary Zimmerman at the Goodman Theatre, Chicago, the Shakespeare Theatre, Washington D.C., and The Huntington Theatre in Boston.

She was also a part of the Drama League Nominated, two person revival of Stephen Sondheim's Marry Me A Little with Jason Tam, off-Broadway at the Clurman Theatre with Keen Company. The cast album was recorded by Ghostlight/Sh-K-Boom and released November 2013.

In 2017, Lauren originated the role of Bella Rose in the Drama Desk Award-Winning Off-Broadway show Desperate Measures. She received the Lucille Lortel Award for Outstanding Actress in a Musical and Outer Critics Circle for Best Supporting Actress nominations. Broadway world said, "...Lauren Molina, as Bella, gives one of those uproarious performances that used to make people stay home on Saturday nights to see on "The Carol Burnett Show." She mugs unmercifully, belts out a sassy strip number and, [has an] homage to Groucho and Harpo's classic mirror scene in "Duck Soup."

The show began at the York Theatre then transferred to New World Stages. She recorded the original cast album released by Sony Masterworks.

She is a co-conceiver of the new actor-musician revisal of “You're a Good Man, Charlie Brown” which debuted at the Cincinnati Playhouse in April 2019. She also played the role of Lucy and was described by the Cincinnati Enquirer as "a powerhouse of a performer". Critics raved that “The production at Cincinnati Playhouse in the Park may be the best we are likely to ever encounter, thanks to the inventiveness of the presentation and the talented cast.”

She has been seen regionally as Squeaky Fromme in Assassins directed by James Bundy (Yale Rep), Eileen in Wonderful Town directed by Mary Zimmerman (Goodman Theatre), Countess in A Little Night Music directed by Peter DuBois (Huntington Theatre Company), Audrey in Little Shop of Horrors directed by Amanda Dehnert (Cleveland Play House), Janet in The Rocky Horror Show directed by Hunter Foster (Bucks County Playhouse), The World Premiere of Meet Me In Saint Louis: A Radio Play directed by Gordon Greenberg (Bucks County Playhouse) and It's a Wonderful Life: A Radio Play directed by Gordon Greenberg (Bucks County Playhouse).

Other roles she's originated include: Megan in the world premiere musical, NOBODY LOVES YOU, at both The Old Globe and off-Broadway at Second Stage in 2013; Miss Jones 1 in TEN CENTS A DANCE, with Donna McKechnie and Malcolm Gets at the Williamstown Theatre Festival (This original musical, created by John Doyle, utilized actor/singer/musicians, Lauren playing cello, bass, guitar, ukulele and saxophone, and expressed the story thru the music of Rodgers and Hart); Liza in THE FORTRESS OF SOLITUDE by Itamar Moses and Michael Friedman.

She was a featured singer at "The Ladies Who Sing Sondheim" concert with Barbara Cook and Patti Lupone at the Westport Playhouse. She also was a soloist at the "Tribute for Angela Lansbury" with Tyne Daly and Christine Ebersole held at the Bucks County Playhouse. In addition, she was a back-up singer for Sarah Brightman on her La Luna tour.

== Acting Credits ==
=== Theater ===
Year	Title	Role	Theater	Notes
2005	Sweeney Todd: The Demon Barber of Fleet Street	Johanna/Cello	Eugene O'Neill Theatre	Broadway; Original Revival Cast
2006	Sweeney Todd: The Demon Barber of Fleet Street	Johanna/Cello	National Tour	
2008	Rock of Ages	Regina/Candi	New World Stages	Off-Broadway
2009	Rock of Ages	Regina/Candi	Brooks Atkinson Theatre	Broadway
2010	Candide	Cundegonde	Goodman Theatre	Regional
2010	Candide	Cundegonde	Shakespeare Theatre Company	Regional
2011	Candide	Cundegonde	Huntington Theatre Company	Regional
2011	Ten Cents a Dance	Miss Jones One	Williamstown Theatre Festival	—
2012	Nobody Loves You	Megan	Old Globe Theatre	World Premiere; Regional
2012	Nobody Loves You	Megan	New World Stages	Workshop production Part of NAMT's 24th Annual Festival of New Musicals.
2012	Fortress of Solitude	Skater Girl/Liza	Vassar College	Workshop production
2012	It's a Wonderful Life: A Live Radio Play	Lana	Bucks County Playhouse	Regional
2013	Marry Me A Little	Woman	Keen Company	Regional
2013	Meet Me in St. Louis: A Live Radio Play	Lana Sherwood	Bucks County Playhouse	Regional
2013	Nobody Loves You	Megan	Second Stage Theater	Off-Broadway
2013	The Rocky Horror Show	Janet	Bucks County Playhouse	Regional
2014	Murder Ballad	Sara	Theatre Under The Stars	Regional
2015	Nerds	Myrtle	—	Workshop production
2015	A Little Night Music	Countess Charlotte Malcolm	Huntington Theatre Company	Regional
2016	Little Shop of Horrors	Audrey	Cleveland Playhouse	Regional
2016	Wonderful Town	Eileen Sherwood	Goodman Theatre	Regional
2016	Sex Tips for Straight Women from a Gay Man	Robyn	777 Theatre	Off-Broadway; Replacement; Performed with The Skivvies bandmate Nick Cearley
2017	Assassins	Squeaky Fromme	Yale Repertory Theatre	Regional
2017	Desperate Measures	Bella Rose	York Theatre	Off-Broadway
2018	Desperate Measures	Bella Rose	New World Stages	Off-Broadway
2019	You're a Good Man, Charlie Brown	Lucy	Cincinnati Playhouse	Regional; Molina was a co-conceiver of this production along with Nick Cearley.
2019	The Decline and Fall of the Entire World as Seen Through the Eyes of Cole Porter	Ensemble	York Theatre	Off-Broadway; Part of the 2019 Musicals in Mufti series.
2020	Cabaret	Sally Bowles	Bristol Riverside Theatre	Regional; Production was postponed due to the COVID-19 pandemic. It was remounted with a new cast in March 2023.
2022	Goldie, Max, and Milk	Goldie	59E59 Theaters	Off-Broadway

=== Television ===
Year	Title	Role	Notes
2006	51st Annual Drama Desk Awards	Herself	Episode dated 21 May 2006. Performed with the cast of Sweeney Todd
2006	Live with Regis and Kelly	Herself	Episode dated 5 June 2006. Performed with the cast of Sweeney Todd
2006	60th Annual Tony Awards	Herself	Episode dated 11 June 2006. Performed with the cast of Sweeney Todd
2011	Lights Out	Cindy	Episode: "The Shot"
2013	It Could Be Worse	Monitor	Episode: "Give 'Em Hell For Me Kid"
2015	The Good Wife	Lucy Van Gaal	Episode: "KSR"
2018	The Today Show	Herself	Episode dated 16 August 2018. Performed with the cast of Desperate Measures.

=== Film ===
Year	Title	Role	Notes
2011	Death is Lame	Lora	20 minute short
2017	My Idle	Lauren Owings	8 minute short

== Music ==
Molina's vocal diversity ranges from pop belting to coloratura soprano. She can often be found singing in New York City and across the country with her wit-rock comedy-pop duo The Skivvies. Lauren and her Skivvies bandmate, Nick Cearley, played Brad and Janet in The Rocky Horror Show at the Bucks County Playhouse directed by Hunter Foster in 2013.

In 2007, Molina released her first EP entitled "Doo-Be-Doo". Featuring all original folk/pop songs, this album is quirky and playful, with instrumentations such as ukulele, cello, guitar, piano, and accordion. In 2010, she released "Sea For Two" her first full-length album through the indy label Mother West.

Molina has been a frequent collaborator with Jason Reischel, the Singer-Songwriter behind "My Cousin, The Emperor". In 2007, she played cello on the song "Pieces Fall in Place" for Reischel's solo album Irony-Free Parlor Music. Molina also appeared on the My Cousin, The Emperor songs Annie (The Levee Song) (cello) and Somedays (cello/vocals) from their 2011 EP The Subway Eps, Vol. I: Prospect Park West.

Videos from live performances can be found on her youtube channel.

== Comedy ==
Molina created a webseries entitled "Rock of Ages Productions" along with former Rock of Ages castmates Mitchell Jarvis and Wesley Taylor. This absurd backstage mocumentary has 17 episodes and can be watched on YouTube at www.youtube.com/rockofagesprod.
