= Desperate Measures (musical) =

U.S. musical comedy

- Promotional artwork
- Music: David Friedman
- Lyrics: Peter Kellogg
- Book: Peter Kellogg
- Setting: American Old West, late 1800s
- Basis: Measure for Measure
- Premiere: May 1, 2004: Irving, Texas, U.S.

Desperate Measures is an American musical comedy with music by David Friedman and book and lyrics by Peter Kellogg. The show won acclaim with Drama Desk Awards for Best Music and Best Lyrics, and Outer Critics Circle and Off-Broadway Alliance Awards for Best Musical from its run at the York Theatre in New York City in 2017.

== History ==
The show is based on William Shakespeare's comedy Measure for Measure. The plot and casting is streamlined with equivalents only for Angelo (Governor Otto Von Richterhenkenpflichtgetruber), Isabella (Susanna/Sister Mary Jo), Claudio (Johnny Blood), Duke Vincentio (Sheriff), a composite of Juliet and Mariana (Bella Rose), and a drunken priest (Friar Peter is the clergyman with the most lines in Shakespeare's play, at seven), and is set in Arizona Territory at the turn of the 19th and 20th centuries. "Desperate Measures" marks the fifth collaboration between Peter Kellogg and David Friedman. Kellogg penned the rhyming couplets in order that they may be more accessible to the audience as well as humorous. Kellogg stated; "It’s Jewish country music" and "It’s my brand of that [style of music], which makes it accessible."

== Synopsis ==
Act I

Johnny Blood, a hotheaded young cowboy, killed a man in a bar fight for a saloon girl Bella Rose, and is sentenced to death (“The Ballad of Johnny Blood”). Knowing that Johnny killed in self-defense, the sheriff decides to ask Johnny's sister Susanna, a novice nun – Sister Mary Jo, to plead with the governor for Johnny's life (“That’s Just How It Is”). The governor, who sees strict law and order as his political legacy (“Some Day They Will Thank Me”), ignores her plead (“Look in Your Heart”), but suggests exchanging Susanna's chastity for Johnny's freedom.

Seeing the dilemma Susanna faces, Johnny argues “It’s Good to Be Alive”. The sheriff suggests a plan to switch Susanna with a saloon girl after the dark (“It Doesn’t Hurt to Try”).

They find Bella Rose, who agrees to participate for free because she is in love with Johnny (“It’s Getting Hot in Here”). The sheriff and Susanna coach Bella to walk and smile like a nun, while Bella teaches Susanna to lighten up (“The Way That You Feel”). Alone, Sheriff wonders about the feeling he has grown towards Susanna (“Stop There”).

At night, Susanna goes to the governor's house, only to switch with Bella after the light is off. Everyone wonders how their lives are changed “In the Dark”.

Act II

The next morning, Susanna visits the governor for Johnny's pardon, but he confesses that he has fallen in love with her (“What a Night!” – “About Last Night”), and threatens to still have Johnny hanged if Susanna does not agree to marry him the next day.

Bella Rose visits Johnny in the jail, who becomes jealous of her sleeping with another guy, even though it is for saving his life (“Just for You”).

The sheriff comes up with a new idea. He has the governor sign a new agreement: if Sister Mary Jo agrees to marry him, Johnny will go free (“What a Day”). At the same time, he has Susanna telegram the abbey to allow Bella to become a nun, also named Sister Mary Jo, to marry the governor. As plan B, he also leaves Johnny a key and a horse to escape. Susanna realizes her feeling for this man (“What is This Feeling”).

Everyone wonders what will happen (“Life Takes You by Surprise”). The governor barges into the dressing room, almost exposing the plan, which is only saved by the identical wedding dresses and some quick wit. Susanna and Bella decide they should have fun with the fake wedding (“It’s a Beautiful Day”). Instead of escaping to Mexico, Johnny stops the ceremony. The sheriff finally gets the upper hand, and the wedding becomes the happy ending for both couples (“Finale”).

== Productions ==
The musical premiered at Lyric Stage in Irving, Texas on April 30 and closed May 15, 2004. It was staged and directed by Cheryl Denson, with musical direction by James McQuillen, scenic design by Wade Giampa (1950-2009), lighting design by Susan A. White, and costume design by Billie Boston. This was the third David Friedman premiere at the Lyric which had previously produced the United States mainland premiere of King Island Christmas in 1999 and Listen to My Heart: The Songs of David Friedman in 2001. The Irving, Texas production featured; Jimmy Nelson as Johnny Blood, Dara Whitehead as Susanna/Sister Mary Jo, Ron Gonzales as the sheriff, Brad M. Johnson as the priest, Bradley Campbell as the governor and Gina Biancardi as Bella Rose.

The musical opened at the New York Music Theater Festival on September 12, 2006, and ran through September 24 at the 45th Street Theatre in New York City. The New York cast included Merwin Foard, Patrick Garner, Ginifer King, Jenny Powers, Max von Essen, and Nick Wyman.

In 2012, a rhyming verse version of Desperate Measures was performed at The Spirit of Broadway Theater in Norwich, Ct. The show ran from June 27 to July 29. It was directed by Brett Bernardini, with choreography by Christine Snitken-Bouley, lighting design by Greg Solomon, scenic design by Mike Billings, sound design by Steven Hinchey, and musical direction by Dan Brandl. The production featured Michael Sullivan, Aline O'Connor, Corrado Alicata, Johnny Marion, Keith Johnson and Shauna Goodgold.

The Original Off-Broadway production premiered at the York Theatre in New York City on September 19, 2017, running until December 31, 2017. Due to popular demand, the show season was extended three times. The cast featured Emma Degerstedt as Susanna/Sister Mary Jo, Gary Marachek as Father Morse, Lauren Molina as Bella Rose, Conor Ryan as Johnny Blood, Peter Saide as Sheriff Green and Nick Wyman as Governor von Richterhenkenpflichtgetruber with Anthony Festa, Celia Hottenstein and Tom Souhrada as Standbys. An original cast album of this production was recorded in December 2017 and released by Sony Masterworks Broadway.

The production featured on Stage 4 at New World Stages from May 30 to October 28, 2018, featuring the same cast as the York Theatre production with the notable cast change of Sarah Parnicky replacing Emma Degerstedt as Susanna/Sister Mary Jo.

== Roles and principal casts ==
=== Casts ===
Character	Irving (2004)	New York (2006)	Norwich (2012)	Original Off-Broadway Cast, York Theatre (2017)	Off-Broadway Cast, New World Stages (2018)
Johnny Blood	Jimmy Nelson	Max von Essen	Michael Sullivan	Conor Ryan	Conor Ryan
Susanna/Sister Mary Jo	Dara Whitehead	Ginifer King	Aline O'Connor	Emma Degerstedt	Sarah Parnicky
Sheriff	Ron Gonzales	Merwin Foard	Corrado Alicata	Peter Saide	Peter Saide
Priest	Brad M. Johnson	Patrick Garner	Johnny Marion	Gary Marachek	Gary Marachek
Governor	Bradley Campbell	Nick Wyman	Keith Johnson	Nick Wyman	Nick Wyman
Bella Rose	Gina Biancardi	Jenny Powers	Shauna Goodgold	Lauren Molina	Lauren Molina
Standby Johnny Blood/Sheriff	—N/a	—N/a	—N/a	Anthony Festa	Anthony Festa
Standby Bella Rose/Susanna	—N/a	—N/a	—N/a	Celia Hottenstein	Celia Hottenstein
Standby Governor/Priest	—N/a	—N/a	—N/a	Tom Souhrada	Tom Souhrada

== Critical reception ==
Michael Dale of Broadway World called it a; "[K]ick-ass new tuner, cleverly written in rhyming couplets that flow easily into song". Dale suggests that David Friedman and Peter Kellogg have "problem solver" added to their billing in reference to how scholars often refer to "Measure for measure" as one of Shakespeare's "problem plays". The review goes on to compare Lauren Molina's performance as "..one of those uproarious performances that used to make people stay home on Saturday nights to see on the "Carol Burnette Show". Dale stated that the highlight of the score is the number "All for you" (Just for You) after Conor Ryan's dunderheaded character explains to his sister Bella (played by Molina) that it wouldn't be too bad to spend one night with the governor in order to save his life but becomes upset that she is the one doing it.

== Awards and nominations ==
The York Theatre production won several awards, including Drama Desk Awards for Outstanding Musical and for Outstanding Lyrics; the Outer Critics Circle award for Outstanding New Off-Broadway Musical; and Off-Broadway Alliance Award for Best New Musical. It was also nominated for many Lucille Lortel Awards.

=== York Theatre ===
Year	Award ceremony	Category	Nominee	Result
2018	Outer Critics Circle Award	Outstanding New Off-Broadway Musical		Won
2018	Outer Critics Circle Award	Outstanding Book of a Musical	Peter Kellogg	Nominated
2018	Outer Critics Circle Award	Outstanding New Score	Peter Kellogg; David Friedman	Nominated
2018	Outer Critics Circle Award	Outstanding Director of a Musical	Bill Castellino	Nominated
2018	Outer Critics Circle Award	Outstanding Actor in a Musical	Conor Ryan	Nominated
2018	Outer Critics Circle Award	Outstanding Featured Actress in a Musical	Lauren Molina	Nominated
2018	Outer Critics Circle Award	Outstanding Featured Actor in a Musical	Nick Wyman	Nominated
2018	Drama Desk Award	Outstanding Musical	York Theatre	Nominated
2018	Drama Desk Award	Outstanding Music	David Friedman	Won
2018	Drama Desk Award	Outstanding Lyrics	Peter Kellogg	Won
2018	Drama Desk Award	Outstanding Book of a Musical	Peter Kellogg	Nominated
2018	Off Broadway Alliance Awards	Best New Musical		Won
2018	Lucille Lortel Awards	Outstanding Musical		Nominated
2018	Lucille Lortel Awards	Outstanding Choreographer	Bill Castellino	Nominated
2018	Lucille Lortel Awards	Outstanding Lead Actress in a Musical	Lauren Molina	Nominated

== Music and cast recording ==
Act I

- "The Ballad of Johnny Blood" — All
- "The Ballad of Johnny Blood (Reprise)" — Johnny
- "That's Just How It Is" — Sheriff
- "Some Day They Will Thank Me" — Governor
- "Look in Your Heart" — Susanna
- "It's Good to Be Alive" — Johnny
- "It Doesn't Hurt to Try" — Sheriff, Johnny, Susanna, Priest
- "It's Getting Hot in Here" — Bella
- "The Way That You Feel" — Susanna, Sheriff, Bella
- "Stop There" — Sheriff
- "In the Dark" — All

Act II

- "What a Night!" — Governor
- "About Last Night" — Governor and Susanna
- "Stop There (Reprise)" — Sheriff
- "Just for You" — Bella and Johnny
- "Just For You (Reprise)" — Bella and Johnny
- "What is This Feeling?" — Susanna
- "Life Takes You by Surprise" — All
- "It's Good to Be Alive" (Reprise) — Johnny
- "It's a Beautiful Day" — Susanna and Bella
- "Finale" — All
