= 13 (musical) =

Musical by Jason Robert Brown, Dan Elish, and Robert Horn

- 2008 Original Broadway Cast Recording
- Music: Jason Robert Brown
- Lyrics: Jason Robert Brown
- Book: Dan Elish; Robert Horn
- Productions: 2007 Los Angeles; 2008 Goodspeed Musicals; 2008 Broadway; 2012 London; 2019 Mexico; 2022 Brazil

13 is a musical with music and lyrics by Jason Robert Brown and book by Dan Elish and Robert Horn.

Following a move from New York City to small-town Indiana, young Evan Goldman grapples with his parents' divorce, prepares for his impending Bar Mitzvah, and navigates the complicated social circles of a new school. 13 is the only Broadway musical ever with a cast and band entirely made of teenagers.

The Broadway production opened October 5, 2008 at the Bernard B. Jacobs Theatre, and closed January 4, 2009. Directed by Jeremy Sams, the original Broadway production is notable for the professional debuts of Ariana Grande and Elizabeth Gillies, who went on to costar in the Nickelodeon television series Victorious.

Netflix released a 2022 film adaptation, to mixed reviews.

== Plot synopsis ==
Twelve-year-old New Yorker Evan Goldman is soon to become a man by having his Bar Mitzvah. He wants his party to be amazing, but that might not happen because his parents are splitting up as his father starts to fall in love with a stewardess, causing his mother to file a divorce against her husband ("13/Becoming a Man"). Just as Evan thinks that maybe things will be fine, his mother calls to tell him they are moving to Appleton, Indiana. Once there, Evan finds a friend in his neighbor, Patrice, who develops a crush on Evan while telling him about Appleton, Indiana ("The Lamest Place in the World").

Later that month, Evan meets Brett Sampson, the most popular kid in school, along with his goons, Malcolm and Eddie, and tells Brett and his friends to take Kendra, a very pretty girl whom Brett wants to date, to a scary movie where Brett can do "The Tongue". Brett nicknames Evan "Brain" because of his idea. Later, Brett asks out Kendra, but Lucy, her jealous friend who has a crush on Brett, tries to tell Kendra she can't go ("Hey, Kendra"). When Brett tells Evan that the idea seems to have worked, Evan is thrilled; this means that Brett will come to his Bar Mitzvah party, and if Brett comes, everyone else will come. Patrice, however, is displeased. If she goes to the Bar Mitzvah party, nobody else will go because the other kids don't like her and Evan will be viewed as "uncool" for hanging out with her. Evan does not think that it will be that bad, but when he hands out the invitations, he sees that Patrice is right, and in a moment of panic, rips up her invitation so the popular kids will come ("13 (Reprise)").

As the other kids express their excitement over Evan's party, Archie, a boy with muscular dystrophy, enters and introduces himself. He is upset at Evan for humiliating Patrice – his best and only friend – but promises to help make it up to her if Evan gets him a date with Kendra. When Archie's attempts to use his degenerative illness to guilt Evan into getting him the date do not work, Archie tries to convince him that Evan is the only one who can get Archie the date and if he doesn't, Archie will show up to Evan's Bar Mitzvah party and ruin it ("Get Me What I Need"). Evan finally relents. Later, at cheerleading practice, Kendra teaches a new cheer while Lucy resolves to make Brett her boyfriend ("Opportunity"). Archie tries to talk Patrice into giving Evan a second chance, especially since she has a crush on him, but she has lost faith in him and is still upset at what he did to her ("What It Means To Be A Friend").

In class, Brett tells Evan to get his mother to buy them all tickets to "The Bloodmaster." Evan protests that his mother will not buy them tickets to an R-rated movie, but Brett points out that if she doesn't, nobody will go to his Bar Mitzvah party and Evan will be uncool. Evan cycles through possible plans, eventually realizing that he will have Archie use his illness to guilt Evan's mother ("All Hail the Brain/Terminal Illness"). To make things better with Patrice, Evan asks her to go to the movie with him as a date. He then realizes that he "just set Brett and Archie up to be on dates with the same girl, on the same night, in the same place...." Evan makes Archie promise to do nothing more than sit next to Kendra so as not to screw up Brett's date. Archie agrees, and everyone prepares for Friday night ("Getting Ready").

Everyone gets to the movie and Brett prepares for "The Tongue." Lucy is on "Tongue Patrol" and Kendra waits for it along with Eddie and Malcolm. Amidst it all, Patrice is upset because Evan is not sitting with her; he is saving a seat for Archie, who arrives intending to win Kendra over ("Any Minute"). During the movie, Lucy pulls Kendra back while Archie and Brett try to kiss her at the same time, causing them to inadvertently kiss each other. Archie reveals how Evan set him up on a date with Kendra. Brett breaks up with Kendra, and Lucy asks if Brett's "tongue is still available." Meanwhile, Evan is left alone by Patrice ("Good Enough").

As Lucy and Brett begin dating, she forces him to spend more time with her. Eddie and Malcolm recognize that Lucy is not good for Brett or for them, and Simon and Richie—Brett's other friends—share their concern ("Bad Bad News"). Evan promises to help to get Brett and Kendra back together so that he can get back on everyone's good side. Archie, fearing that this is a lost cause, begs Patrice to help Evan. She tells Archie she is not going, but he knows she's lying. When Patrice gets there, she surprises Evan by helping him help Brett, but instead of telling Brett what to say to Kendra, they end up telling each other that they are sorry, but Brett is oblivious ("Tell Her"). Brett takes their advice, and when he learns that Lucy and Kendra are fighting over him, he interferes and makes a feeble attempt to get Kendra back, and to his surprise, she forgives him.

Meanwhile, Lucy learns of it and won't take the hint. She spreads a rumor that Kendra is cheating on Brett with Evan, and then gets Evan and Kendra in the same place so that Brett can catch them ("It Can't Be True"). Her plan works, and Brett lashes out at Evan. Evan, finally having enough of Brett, stands up to him and says that Archie and Patrice are his real friends. After Brett insults Archie and Patrice, Evan shoves him, and Brett punches him in the nose, giving him a nosebleed. Patrice immediately rushes to Evan's aid. Kendra shows kindness towards Archie before running after Brett.

Evan wants to call off the Bar Mitzvah party because it would only be him, Patrice, and Archie, but Patrice and Archie point out it that won't be that bad, and Evan starts to agree. He surprises Patrice with a kiss, and she surprises him back ("If That's What It Is"). Evan has his Bar Mitzvah party after all; he is starting to understand what growing up means, and the characters tell of what surprises turning thirteen brought for each of them ("A Little More Homework"). Evan tells the audience that he is "thirteen years old. And [he's] just getting started."

An encore is performed to end the show and the band is brought onstage ("Brand New You").

== Musical numbers ==
- "13/Becoming a Man" – Evan and Company
- "The Lamest Place in the World" – Patrice
- "Hey Kendra" – Brett, Malcolm, Eddie, Lucy, and Kendra
- "Get Me What I Need" – Archie and Company
- "Opportunity" – Lucy and Cheerleaders
- "What It Means to Be a Friend" – Patrice
- "All Hail the Brain" – Evan and Company
- “Here I Come” — Evan and Company
- "Terminal Illness" – Evan, Archie, and Company
- "Getting Ready" – Archie, Evan, Lucy, Kendra, Brett, Eddie, Malcolm, and Company
- "Any Minute" – Brett, Kendra, Patrice, and Archie
- "Good Enough" – Patrice
- "Being a Geek" – Evan, Rabbi, and Rabbis
- "Bad Bad News" – Eddie, Malcolm, Simon, and Richie
- "Tell Her" – Evan and Patrice
- "It Can't Be True" – Lucy, Molly, Cassie, Charlotte, Eddie, Malcolm, and Company
- "If That's What It Is" – Archie, Patrice, and Evan
- "A Little More Homework" – Evan, Charlotte, and Company
- "Brand New You" – Cassie, Charlotte, Molly, and Company

"Good Enough" was included in the Original Broadway Production, but was not on the Cast Recording.

"Opportunity" and "Here I Come" were both included on the Original Broadway Cast Recording, but were cut from the production before opening night. The song "Here I Come" originally came after "Good Enough", followed by "Opportunity", which was retooled and included in the MTI Version with new lyrics and a new spot in the show. "Being a Geek" was likewise not included in the Original Broadway Production, but took the place of "Here I Come" in the MTI Version.

== Characters and original cast ==
Character	Los Angeles	Connecticut	Broadway	West End
Character	2007	2008		2012
Evan Goldman	Ricky Ashley	Graham Phillips	Graham Phillips	Guy Harvey
Patrice	Sara Niemietz	Allie Trimm	Allie Trimm	Sienna Kelly
Archie	Tyler Mann	Aaron Simon Gross	Aaron Simon Gross	Tim Mahendran
Brett	J.D. Phillips	Eric Nelsen	Eric Nelsen	Jacques Miché
Kendra	Emma Degerstedt	Ashton Smalling	Delaney Moro	Hannah Thompson
Lucy	Caitlin Baunoch	Elizabeth Gillies	Elizabeth Gillies	Georgia Riley
Eddie	Christian Vandal	Al Calderon	Al Calderon	Jack Cashion
Malcolm	Seth Zibalese	Kyle Crews	Malik Hammond	Robin Franklin
Molly	Chloé Smith	Caitlin Gann	Caitlin Gann	Lindsay Kearns
Charlotte	Jenáe Burrows	Ariana Grande	Ariana Grande	Lauren Ellington
Cassie	Tinashe Kachingwe	Taylor Bright	Brynn Williams	Amara Okereke
Simon	Ellington Ratliff	Joey LaVarco	Joey LaVarco	Toby Turpin
Richie	Ryan Ogburn	Eamon Foley	Eamon Foley	Sario Watanabe-Solomon

== Productions ==
=== Pre-Broadway ===
==== Los Angeles (2007) ====
The musical premiered on January 7, 2007 at The Mark Taper Forum in Los Angeles, California, and ran through February 18, 2007. The production was directed by Todd Graff, with choreography by Michele Lynch, and the cast and band were all teenagers. This production received a nomination for the 2007 LA Stage Alliance Ovation Awards, World Premiere Musical. The cast and band for the Mark Taper Forum production: Ricky Ashley, Caitlin Baunoch, Molly Bernstein, Jenáe Burrows, Emma Degerstedt, Jamie Eblen, Julia Harriman, Jordan Johnson, Tinashe Kachingwe, Tyler Mann, Sara Niemietz, Ryan Ogburn, J.D. Phillips, Ellington Ratliff, Chris Raymond, Charlie Rosen, Alex Scolari, Chloé Smith, Christian Vandal, Nehemiah Williams and Seth Zibalese.

==== Connecticut (2008) ====
The musical was next presented at the Norma Terris Theatre in Chester, Connecticut, by Goodspeed Musicals from May 9, 2008 through June 8, 2008, with direction by Jeremy Sams and choreography by Christopher Gattelli. It starred most of the original Broadway cast, except that it featured Ashton Smalling as Kendra, Taylor Bright as Cassie, and Kyle Crews as Malcolm.

=== Broadway (2008) ===
The musical opened on Broadway at the Bernard B. Jacobs Theatre on September 16, 2008 in previews, with an official opening on October 5, 2008 and closed on January 4, 2009 after 105 performances and 22 previews. The director and choreographer were the same as at Goodspeed, and most of the Broadway cast was also in the Goodspeed production (except Moro, Hammond and Williams). There was a teen band, as in prior productions. The production received one Drama Desk Award nomination, for Outstanding Lyrics by Brown. 13 is the first and only all Teenager Cast and Band to ever hit Broadway.

=== Post-Broadway productions ===
Revivals featuring revisions to the show made by Brown, Dan Elish and Robert Horn were staged at French Woods Performing Arts Camp in summer 2009, Theatre Under the Stars, Houston, in the fall 2009, and Indian Head camp in summer 2010. In 2010, Ransom Everglades Theatre staged a revival in Miami from March 19–22, directed and choreographed by Angelica Torres.

The musical opened Off-Broadway at the McGinn/Cazale Theatre on April 23, 2011, in a production by the Children's Acting Company. This six-performance engagement used the revisions by Brown, Elish and Horn.

13 had its first production in Seattle at Nathan Eckstein Middle School in May 2010. It was produced the following year by Broadway Bound Children's Theatre at ACT Theatre in Seattle, Washington, under the direction of the company's artistic director, Jimmy Nixon. It was performed twice by that company, first in December 2011, and later in July 2015. In 2009–2010, show was performed in several productions in Jerusalem, Israel.

The first UK production of 13 was given by The Rival Theatre company at Cecil Hepworth playhouse in April 2010. Jason Robert Brown gave his blessing and a quote for the poster. Riverside Theatre Company of Cambridgeshire and very closely followed by Young Performers Theatre Company, of Shrewsbury, both in June 2010. The West End production of 13, by the National Youth Music Theatre, premiered at the Apollo Theatre in Westminster, London on August 22, 2012 and ran for 6 performances. The production was directed by Jason Robert Brown. As with the Broadway production, the cast were all teenagers. A West End cast recording was made at Sphere Recording Studios in Battersea, London and released on December 18, 2012.

In 2011, Theatre Noir presented the first Hong Kong productions in both English and Cantonese. The premiere of the Cantonese version took place at Jockey Club Auditorium, The Hong Kong Polytechnic University, 7 October 2011. In September 2014, Theatre Noir presented a re-run in both English and Cantonese in Yuen Long Theatre.

In March 2012, 13 made its South Australian debut when it was performed by Adelaide Youth Theatre for the Adelaide Fringe Festival at the Adelaide College of the Arts. It was directed by Rodney Hutton and musically directed by Michelle Nightingale.

A West Australian production of 13 opened on February 4, 2015 as part of the Fringeworld Festival. Presented by Playlovers at Hackett Hall, Floreat, it was directed by Kimberley Shaw with musical direction by Stepnhen Beerkens and Madeleine Shaw. In December 2013, a Flemish/Dutch version was mounted by Jeugdtheater Ondersteboven, a youth theatre company in Sint-Niklaas, Belgium.

== Adaptations ==
=== Novelization ===
The musical was adapted into a children's novel written by Dan Elish and Jason Robert Brown and released in June 2009 (Broadway production had already closed) by publisher Harper Collins.

As with other book adaptations of musicals, the book contains many details, scenes and characters that were not used or changed in the musical for being a show only with teenage characters.

For example, many adult characters like Evan's parents, Angelina, the stewardess with whom Evan's father falls in love and causes a divorce, Pam, a friend of Evan's mom who they're moving in with in Appleton, and a Rabbi whom Evan takes haftorah classes in a nearby town, are more prominent.

=== Film ===
In 2014, CBS Films announced that they intended to produce a film adaption of the musical. The screenplay was expected to be written by Bert V. Royal, with producers Laurence Mark, Bob Boyett and executive producer David Blackman. Jason Robert Brown was expected to oversee the adaptation's music and lyrics.

However, in 2019, it was announced that 13 would become a Netflix original film with Neil Meron producing. The screenplay was expected to be written by Robert Horn and directed by Tamra Davis. In October 2020, Neil Meron issued an open casting call for the teen roles, with rehearsals set to begin in March 2021. In April 2021, it was announced that Davis, Jason Robert Brown, Horn, Bob Boyett and Mark Nicholson would produce the film with Eli Golden (Evan), Gabriella Uhl (Patrice), JD McCrary (Brett), Frankie McNellis (Lucy), Lindsey Blackwell (Kendra), Jonathan Lengel (Archie), Ramon Reed (Eddie), Nolen Dubuc (Malcolm), Luke Islam (Carlos), Shechinah Mpumlwana (Cassie), Kayleigh Cerezo (Molly), Wyatt Moss (Zee), Liam Wignall (KC), and Khiyla Aynne (Charlotte) set to star. In May 2021, it was announced that Debra Messing (Mom) was set to star in the film. In June, they cast Rhea Perlman (Grandma Ruth), Josh Peck (Rabbi Shaperio) and Peter Hermann (Joel Goldman).

It was said that content from the 2009 book would also be used in the film adaptation.

Filming took place in New York City; Toronto (Ontario); Walkerton, Indiana; Beeton, Ontario; and Brampton, Ontario.

In late April 2022, Netflix released some stills from the film, along with the official release date. The movie was released on Netflix on August 12, 2022.
