= Service Program for Older People =

- Founded: 1972
- Founders: Health care and Social workers
- Type: Community Service
- Purpose: Silver Community
- Location: New York City
- Method: Partnership with NGOs, Project Grants, Personal Donations
- Revenue: ~$3MM
- Endowment: Mary Hutchins Foundation, Sidney & Judith Kranes Charitable Trust, The Starr Foundation, Collegiate Church Corporation
- Employees: 21-100
- Volunteers: 107
- Website: http://www.spop.org/

Service Program for Older People (SPOP) is a nonprofit community-based mental health agency that serves adults age 55 and older. It is one of only a handful of agencies in New York City that focus entirely on the mental health needs of older people. SPOP's services include individual counseling, group therapy and support groups, mental health home visits, medication management, psychosocial assessment, family counseling and caregiver support, information and referral and education.

SPOP has received national awards from the American Association for Geriatric Psychiatry, the American Psychiatric Association and AARP.

SPOP is known for its program of home visits to disabled clients and outreach through senior centers in Harlem, the Lower East Side, East Village and Yorkville neighborhoods of Manhattan. The clinic offers treatment in five languages. SPOP is also home to New York State's only PROS/Personalized Recovery Oriented Services program exclusively for older adults.

== History ==
Originally called New York Service Program for Older People, SPOP was founded in 1972 by a consortium of health care and social service providers that recognized the need for mental health services among the older population of Manhattan’s West Side. Beginning as a program called Selfhelp Community Services, Inc., SPOP became an independent, nonprofit organization in 1979 with funding from the New York City Department of Mental Health, Mental Retardation & Alcoholism Services (now the Department of Health and Mental Hygiene). In 2006, the agency’s name was changed to Service Program for Older People.

== Finance ==
Funding for SPOP is provided by city and state agencies; Medicaid, Medicare and private insurance reimbursements; fees, and the contributions of foundations, corporations and individual donors. SPOP is a member of The Federation of Protestant Welfare Agencies, which receives Federal grants. SPOP organization is a 501(c)(3) Public Charity.
