= Nick Cearley =

American actor and musician

Nick Cearley is an American actor, musician, singer, and dancer. A Fairfield, Ohio native, Cearley received his BFA from the Boston Conservatory for Musical Theatre with an emphasis in acting. He currently resides in New York City. Best known as one half of the critically acclaimed Indie-Pop Duo, The Skivvies. OUT selected Cearley on its OUT 100 List of 2014 as one of the most intriguing and compelling LGBT Actors of the year. He has performed in several shows such as in the 1st National Tour of All Shook Up, Buyer and Cellar at Bucks County, The Rocky Horror Show, and Sex Tips for Straight Women from a Gay Man Off-Broadway. Cearley most recently performed as Seymour in the Cincinnati Playhouse in the Park production of Little Shop Of Horrors.

== See also ==
- The Skivvies
