= Emma Degerstedt =

American television actress and singer

- Born: Emma Kristina Degerstedt; April 13, 1992 (age 34); Long Beach, California, U.S.
- Education: UCLA
- Occupations: Actress, singer
- Years active: 2003–present

Emma Kristina Degerstedt (born April 13, 1992) is an American television actress and singer. Degerstedt is of Swedish descent.

== Career ==
Her television roles include Maris in the Nickelodeon series Unfabulous. She has also appeared on stage in the play 13, a 2007 production in which she played Kendra.

In 2003, she played "Baby June" in a 2003 production of Gypsy. In June 2007, she participated in the 2007 Miller Children's Torch Run Celebrities. That same year, she played Teenage Samantha in the ABC sitcom Samantha Who? for one episode. In 2010, she portrayed Barbara in a Huntington Beach Academy for the Performing Arts production of Dark of the Moon.

In December 2012, Degerstedt sang and danced in the production Kritzerland Records' Christmas with a Little Bit of Hannukah and a Lot of Cheer at Sterling's Upstairs at the Federal in North Hollywood. She performed two songs, "Be A Santa" and the solo "Santa Baby". She is currently attending University of California, Los Angeles, majoring in theatre.

== Filmography ==
=== Film ===
| Year | Title | Role | Notes |
|---|---|---|---|
| 2008 | The Curious Case of Benjamin Button | Ballet Dancer | (uncredited) |

=== Television ===
| Year | Title | Role | Notes |
|---|---|---|---|
| 2008 | Life | Carly Brimmer | Episode: "Did You Feel That?" |
| 2008 | The Big Bang Theory | Emma | Episode: "The Jerusalem Duality" |
| 2004-2007 | Unfabulous | Maris Bingham | 32 Episodes |
| 2007 | Samantha Who? | Teenage Samantha #2 | Episode: "The Restraining Order" |
| 2005 | Monk | Beth | Episode: "Mr. Monk and Little Monk" |

=== Theater ===
| Year | Title | Role | Theater | Notes |
|---|---|---|---|---|
| 2007 | 13 | Kendra | Mark Taper Forum | World Premiere |
| 2013 | Legally Blonde | Elle Woods | Cabrillo Music Theater | —N/a |
| 2014 | The Little Mermaid | Ariel | Broadway Touring Production | —N/a |
| 2015–2016 | Legally Blonde | Elle Woods | Broadway Touring Production | —N/a |
| 2017 | The Little Mermaid | Ariel | The MUNY | —N/a |
| 2017 | Legally Blonde | Elle Woods | Lexington Theatre Company | —N/a |
| 2017 | Desperate Measures | Susanna/Sister Mary Jo | York Theatre | Off-Broadway |
| 2018 | Smokey Joe's Cafe | Ensemble | Stage 42 | Off-Broadway |
| 2019 | My Very Own British Invasion | Ensemble | Paper Mill Playhouse | World Premiere |
| 2019 | I Spy A Spy | Alina Orlova | Theatre at St. Clements | Off-Broadway |
| 2025 | Chess | Swing u/s Svetlana | Imperial Theatre | Broadway |

== Awards and nominations ==
| Year | Association | Category | Nominated work | Result |
|---|---|---|---|---|
| 2006 | Young Artist Award | Best Young Ensemble Performance in a TV Series (Comedy or Drama) | Unfabulous | Nominated |
| 2007 | Young Artist Award | Best Young Ensemble Performance in a TV Series (Comedy or Drama) | Unfabulous | Nominated |
| 2013 | Ovation Awards | Lead Actress in a Musical | Legally Blonde | Nominated |
| 2018 | Drama Desk Awards | Nominated Best Music and Best Lyrics | Desperate Measures | Nominated |
| 2018 | Outer Critics Circle Award | Outstanding New Off-Broadway Musical | Desperate Measures | Won |
| 2018 | Lucille Lortel Award | Best Musical | Desperate Measures | Won |
