= Nick Wyman =

American actor

Nicholas Wyman
- Born: May 18, 1950 (age 75); Portland, Maine, U.S.
- Occupation(s): Actor, singer, former President of Actors' Equity Association
- Years active: 1978–present

15th President of the Actors' Equity Association
- In office 2010–2015
- Preceded by: Paige Price (acting president)
- Succeeded by: Katherine Shindle

Personal details
- Spouse: Beth McDonald
- Website: www.nickwyman.com

Nick Wyman (born May 18, 1950) is an American stage, television, and film actor, and is a former president of the Actors' Equity Association.

== Early life and education ==
Wyman was born in Portland, Maine and raised in Summit, New Jersey and attended Harvard University.

== Career ==
Wyman received his big break as Freddy in the 1981 revival of My Fair Lady which starred original Higgins Sir Rex Harrison. He later created the role of Firmin in the Broadway production of The Phantom of the Opera. He featured in Die Hard with a Vengeance as Hungarian terrorist and explosive expert Mathias Targo. In 2008, he was cast as John Barsad in the Broadway musical adaptation of A Tale of Two Cities, at the Al Hirschfeld Theatre in New York. He was elected President of Actors Equity in May 2010 and served until 2015.

== Personal life ==
He is the older brother of voice actor Oliver Wyman. He married actress Beth McDonald in 1979. They have two daughters and a son.

== Acting Credits ==
=== Theater ===
Year	Title	Role	Theater	Notes
1972	Grease	Vince Fontaine	Broadhurst Theatre	Broadway Replacement
1974	The Magic Show	Feldman, Goldfarb (Understudy)	Cort Theatre	Broadway Replacement
1975	Very Good Eddie	Mr. Percy Darling	Booth Theatre	Original Broadway Cast
1978	On the Twentieth Century	Bruce Granit	St. James Theatre	Broadway Replacement
1979	Whoopee!	Sheriff Bob Wells	ANTA Theatre	Broadway Replacement
1980	Paris Lights	James Joyce/F. Scott Fitzgerald	American Place Theatre	Off-Broadway
1981	My Fair Lady	Freddy Eynsford-Hill	Uris Theatre	Original Broadway Cast
1984	Kennedy at Colonus	Actor #2	47th Street Theatre	Off-Broadway
1985	Doubles	Chuck	Ritz Theatre	Original Broadway Cast
1987	The Musical Comedy Murders of 1940	Patrick O'Reilly	Circle Theater Company	Off-Broadway
1987	The Musical Comedy Murders of 1940	Patrick O'Reilly	Longacre Theatre	Original Broadway Cast
1988	The Phantom of the Opera	Monsieur Richard Firmin	Majestic Theatre	Original Broadway Cast
1991	1776	Thomas Jefferson	Williamstown Theatre Festival	Regional
1992	Sweeney Todd: The Demon Barber of Fleet Street	Judge Turpin	Paper Mill Playhouse	Regional
1993	The Hunchback of Notre Dame	Frollo	Westbeth Theatre	Off-Broadway
1995	Anyone Can Whistle	Dr. Detmold	Carnegie Hall	Concert
1996	Three in the Back, Two in the Head	Donald Jackson	MCC Theater	Off-Broadway
1996	Applause	Howard	Paper Mill Playhouse	Regional
1997	Les Misérables	Monsieur Thénardier / Chain Gang	Imperial Theatre	Broadway Replacement and Closing Cast
2000	The Producers	Franz Liebkind	Nola Rehearsal Studios	Workshop
2004	A Tale of Two Cities	John Barsad	Little Shubert Theatre	Two day workshop
2004	Sly Fox	Captain Crouch	Ethel Barrymore Theatre	Original Broadway Cast
2005	Dirty Rotten Scoundrels	Lawrence Jameson	Imperial Theatre	Began as standby and took over role later
2005	Tom Jones	Mister Partridge	Theatre at St. Clements	Part of NYMF's 2005 Next Link series
2006	Carnival!	Schlagel	Paper Mill Playhouse	Regional
2006	Desperate Measures	Governor	45th Street Theatre	Part of the 2006 New York Musical Theatre Festival
2006	Take Me Along	Nat Miller	Theatre at St. Peter's Church	Part of the 2006 Musicals in Mufti Concert
2006	A Wonderful Life	Henry Potter	Paper Mill Playhouse	Regional
2007	Howard Katz	Howard Katz (Understudy)	Laura Pels Theatre	—
2008	How to Succeed in Business Without Really Trying	J.B. Biggley	White Plains Performing Arts Center	Regional
2008	A Tale of Two Cities	John Barsad	Al Hirschfeld Theatre	Original Broadway Cast
2009	1776	John Hancock	Paper Mill Playhouse	Regional
2011	Catch Me If You Can	Roger Strong	Neil Simon Theatre	Original Broadway Cast
2012	Bullet for Adolf	Jurgen	New World Stages	Off-Broadway
2017	Sousatzka	Mr. Cordle	Elgin Theatre	World Premiere Production
2017	Austen's Pride	Ensemble	—	Two day workshop
2017	Desperate Measures	Governor	York Theatre	Off-Broadway
2018	Desperate Measures	Governor	New World Stages	Off-Broadway; A remount of the 2017 York Theatre production
2018	Network	Arthur Jensen	Belasco Theatre	Original Broadway Cast
2022	Help	White Man #8	The Shed	Off-Broadway

=== Film ===
Year	Title	Role
1981	Jet Lag	Foundation Officer
1987	Weeds	Associate Warden
1987	Planes, Trains and Automobiles	New York Lawyer
1988	Funny Farm	Dirk Criterion
1989	Rude Awakening	Dr. Abbott
1995	Die Hard with a Vengeance	Matthias Targo
1997	Private Parts	Douglas Kiker
2002	Igby Goes Down	Suit
2002	Maid in Manhattan	Concierge
2006	Spectropia	Verna's Husband
2008	Synecdoche, New York	Soap Actor Doctor
2013	Burning Blue	Ophthalmologist
2016	Split	Enlil / Robert
2018	The Chaperone	Chairman
2019	The Undiscovered Country	Vincent

=== Television ===
Year	Title	Role	Notes
1977	The Best of Families	Johannson	Miniseries
1978	The Dain Curse	Whitey	Episode #1.1
1986	Who's the Boss?	Dr. Carter	Episode: "The Anniversary Show"
1987	Everything's Relative	Tom Garson	Episode: "The Post Graduate"
1988	The Murder of Mary Phagan	Lund	2 episodes
1989	CBS Summer Playhouse	Larry	Episode: "Road Show"
1992	Swans Crossing	Grant Booth	5 episodes
1992	Square One Television	Peeved	2 episodes
1992	Mathnet	Peeved	Episode: "The Case of the Mystery Weekend"
1993	One Life to Live	Peter Manning	Unknown number of episodes. Portrayed from 1993–1994
1994	The Adventures of Pete & Pete	Mr. Ed Narrins	Episode: "Field of Pete"
1997, 2005	Law & Order	Dr. Adams / Judge Mickerson	2 episodes
1998	Cosby	—	Episode: "Out to Launch"
2000	Spin City	Executive	Episode: "Airplane!"
2000	Tales from the Crypt	Rich Man	Episode: "Island of Death"
2001	Big Apple	Klein's Attorney	2 episodes
2003	Queens Supreme	John / Thomas Apernathy	Episode: "Pilot"
2003	Law & Order: Special Victims Unit	Michael Kelly	Episode: "Coerced"
2003, 2006	Chappelle's Show	Frankenstein's Boss / Ron	2 episodes
2009	Guiding Light	Dr. Malcolm	Episode #1.15596
2010	The Good Wife	Andre Baylon	Episode:
2012	Boardwalk Empire	Dr. Robert Landau	4 episodes
2014	Veep	Quincy Carter	Episode: "Crate"
2014	The Mysteries of Laura	Principal	Episode: "Pilot"
2015	Madam Secretary	Pundit	Episode: "Whisper of the Ax"
2015	Elementary	Duncan Brice	Episode: "The Games Underfoot"
2018	The Today Show	Himself	Episode dated 16 August 2018. Performed with the cast of Desperate Measures.
2020	Future Man	Abraham Lincoln	3 episodes
2023	East New York	Bishop McAllister	Episode: "Family Tithes"
