= A Tale of Two Cities (musical) =

- Logo for A Tale of Two Cities
- Music: Jill Santoriello
- Lyrics: Jill Santoriello
- Book: Jill Santoriello
- Basis: A Tale of Two Cities, novel by Charles Dickens
- Productions: 2007 Sarasota Tryout; 2008 Broadway; 2009 Brighton Concert/PBS Airing; 2013 Japan(Toho) 帝国劇場; 2015 Japan(YTJ) 新国立劇場

A Tale of Two Cities is a musical with book, music and lyrics by Jill Santoriello based on the 1859 novel of the same name by Charles Dickens.

After tryouts at the Asolo Repertory Theatre in Sarasota, Florida, in October and November 2007, the show opened on Broadway on September 18, 2008, following previews that began on August 19 at the Al Hirschfeld Theatre. The musical closed on November 9, 2008, after a run of 60 performances and 33 previews. The show received the 2009 Outer Critics Circle Award nomination for Outstanding New Musical for its Broadway run. James Barbour received a 2009 Drama Desk Award nomination for his performance as Sydney Carton.

== Production history ==
Tale creator Santoriello worked on the music beginning in the late 1980s. In 1994, her brother, actor Alex Santoriello, produced and starred in an invitation-only concert styling of many of the songs at the Hilbert Circle Theatre in Indianapolis. The concert starred Richard Kiley as the narrator. Some of the numbers showcased in this styling were eventually cut from the show. In 1999 producers Barbara Russell and Ron Sharpe optioned the show with plans to bring it to Broadway. Together with Santoriello, they began developing the script through readings and producing a concept album of the show. That recording, completed in 2002, featured Alex Santoriello as Dr. Manette / Sydney Carton, Christiane Noll as Lucie Manette, Nick Wyman as John Barsad, Craig Bennett as Jerry Cruncher and Natalie Toro as Madame Defarge.

On August 19 and 20, 2004, for two performances, Tale was again presented for an invitation-only workshop reading in hopes of finding more backers. The production ran at the Little Shubert Theatre in New York City. 100 fans were invited to each performance of the first New York City public presentation. It starred James Barbour as Sydney Carton, Jenny Powers as Lucie Manette, Gary Morris as Alexandre Manette, Gavin Creel as Darnay, Alex Santoriello as Ernest Defarge, Michelle Dawson as Mme. DeFarge and Billy Gilman as Defarge's young brother.

In late 2005, Santoriello and producers announced that the show planned an early winter try-out in Chicago, with Broadway plans for spring 2006. However, directing changes and insufficient funds, with one producer leaving, postponed the production.

The following year the show opened at the Asolo Repertory Theatre in Sarasota, Florida, for pre-Broadway tryouts in October and November 2007. The show sold out its entire run and won ten Sarasota Magazine Awards out of twelve nominations, including for some performers and as "Best Musical." The show starred Barbour as Carton, Derek Keeling as Charles Darnay and Jessica Rush as Lucie, with Natalie Toro as Madame DeFarge. It received mixed to positive notices. Michael Donald Edwards directed, Warren Carlyle choreographed and the creative team included Tony Walton (scenery), David Zinn (costumes), and Richard Pilbrow (lighting).

The musical premiered on Broadway at the Al Hirschfeld Theatre, with previews beginning August 19, 2008 and official opening on September 18. The show received mostly negative notices but some positive reviews, most notably from the Huffington Post, Connecticut Post and radio stations WGCH and WMNR. Three days before the musical opened on Broadway, the U.S. stock market fell sharply. In spite of the reviews and while box office receipts for other Broadway shows were tumbling along with the world financial markets, Tale initially posted good box office receipts. But as the economy worsened, the show lost money and closed November 9, 2008, although a previous announcement of closing was posted for November 16.

In 2009, Samuel French, Inc. acquired the stock and amateur rights to the show. The first productions were at Cherry Hill Township Summer Theatre in summer of 2009 and the Cirillo Summer Theatre in Windsor, CT in 2010 under the direction of Susan J. Vinick. For these productions, Santoriello prepared production materials, including a complete vocal score, that would aid future theatre groups. Santoriello attended the production along with Executive Producer, Ron Sharpe, and other Broadway producers. Clearly, their commitment to the show continued far beyond its Broadway run.

From February 16 to April 9, 2011, Hale Centre Theatre in Salt Lake City produced the show. Both Santoriello and a main producer from the New York production attended and stated being impressed with the cast and production values, particularly the unique set design theatre in the round, of Kacey Udy.

In May 2011, Principia College became the first college to perform Santoriello's musical.

In August 2012, the musical had its Korean language premiere playing 56 performances at the Chung Mu Arts Hall in Seoul Korea. The production received 9 Korea Musical Award nominations including Best Foreign Musical.

On October 21, 2012, the German language premiere was performed by the 'Freies Musical Ensemble' in Münster, Germany, playing 12 performances in total.

The Canadian youth group 'The Singer's Theatre' performed the show's Canadian premiere on August 16, 2013, in Kitchener, Ontario, after a two-week intensive program.

The Japanese premiere was presented by Toho in the summer of 2013 in Tokyo, Japan.

The first Pennsylvania production was staged at Notre Dame High School in Easton, Pennsylvania in April 2015; it earned six Freddy Awards nominations.

On October 19 & 20, 2018, the show's original cast members reunited for a 10th Anniversary Concert at Birdland. The two announced concerts sold out and two additional shows were added which also sold out. In attendance were many of the original producers and the show's Broadway set designer Tony Walton. Reprising their original roles were James Barbour, Brandi Burkhardt, Natalie Toro, Nick Wyman, Craig Bennett, J. Mark McVey, Kevin Greene, Rob Richardson, Rebecca Robbins, Les Minski, Eric Van Tielen, Dan Petrotta, Drew Aber, Jennifer Evans, Alison Walla, Mollie Vogt-Welch and Walter Winston O'Neill.

In May of 2025, the musical will return to Japan for the first time in 12 years, again presented by Toho at the Meiji-za Theatre in Tokyo. The show will run May 7 through 31st, 2025 followed by a three-city tour of Japan in June and July.

== Plot ==
=== Prologue ===
The musical opens with Lucie Manette as a child, en route from France to England. She is delivered by Mr. Jarvis Lorry, an employee of Tellson's Bank to the home of Miss Pross, who had been nanny to Lucie's now-deceased mother. Later, Mr. Lorry returns to the Pross household to tell the now-adult Lucie that her father, Dr. Alex Manette, has been found alive in the Bastille after 17 years (Prologue: The Shadows of the Night).

=== Act 1 ===
Dr. Manette, Lucie and Lorry set sail for England and meet Charles Darnay. Upon arriving, Darnay is arrested as a spy as he is discovered in possession of papers showing British troop placements. It is later found that the papers were dropped by John Barsad, henchman of Darnay's uncle, the Marquis St. Evermonde's (Dover). Lucie requests that Mr. Lorry arrange for a lawyer to defend Darnay in exchange for the kindness he has shown her and her father during their journey and Lorry agrees.

We are then taken to the law office of Mr. Stryver and Sydney Carton - who arrives clearly intoxicated (The Way it Ought to Be - London). Carton decides with his friend, grave robber Jerry Cruncher, to attempt to blackmail Barsad by visiting several local taverns (No Honest Way). The next day, the trial commences (The Trial). Darnay is acquitted after the blackmail attempt succeeds and prompts the key witness to assert that Darnay and Sydney look similar after Sydney removes his barrister's wig and robe. The witness then admits it could have been either man-or anyone else-with those papers.

Darnay takes Sydney and Stryver out to celebrate at a tavern that Sydney calls "home." (Round and Round) After Darnay is insulted by Sydney and leaves, Sydney reflects on why he acted this way (Reflection).

Several months have passed and Darnay now desires Lucie's hand but asks her father's permission first (The Promise). On Christmas Eve, Lucie attempts to convince Sydney to have supper with her and her father, but he declines; out of kindness, she invites him to dinner the following evening, which he must accept. Awakened by her kindness, Sydney realizes what he has been missing in his life (I Can't Recall).

The next day Darnay asks Lucie to marry him and she accepts (Now at Last). Sydney arrives and Lucie gives him his gift - a scarf. Unaware that he would be receiving one, Sydney tells Lucie to close her eyes and kisses her. Shocked, she informs him that Mr. Darnay has asked her hand in marriage. Upset - and embarrassed — Sydney leaves and reflects on the life he now cannot attain, and on the marriage and life of Darnay and Lucie together (If Dreams Came True).

The action then switches over to France, where the king is expected to drive his carriage past Defarge's wine shop. Many children are very excited however near the road. One, the son of a man named Gaspard, is killed when the Marquis St. Evremonde's carriage passes. Madame Defarge, who was unaware of what the children were waiting for, expresses disgust for the death the Marquis has caused and urges Gaspard to murder him (Out of Sight Out of Mind). Gaspard later follows the Marquis to his chateau and does so.

Darnay receives a letter from Gabelle, a former house servant in France, and agrees to defend him in the courts and leaves (Gabelle's Letter/I Always knew). Stryver and Sydney visit the Manette household one evening and Stryver tells of the killings and other developments there. During their visit, Sydney agrees to help put Little Lucie to bed (Now I Lay Me Down To Sleep). Meanwhile, a funeral is being held for Gaspard's son (Little One). At the funeral, officers come to arrest Gaspard for murder, but Ernest Defarge tells him to remain and the revolution begins (Until Tomorrow) Darnay is arrested when it is revealed that he is the Marquis' nephew. Lucie is devastated and turns to Sydney for guidance as Darnay left without explanation or revealing his true identity.

=== Act 2 ===
Act 2 opens with the storming of the Bastille. The Defarges have found the notes left by Dr. Manette in his cell so many years before, but the people of Paris are still unsatisfied after the prison's fall (Everything Stays the Same).

Darnay is sent to trial because he is a member of the aristocracy. At his trial, Madame Defarge reads Dr. Manette's charges against the Marquis St. Evremonde and his brother, who is Charles' father. At the end of his journal, Manette condemns them and all their descendants. Manette himself makes an impassioned plea to recant this and say that Darnay is nothing like his father and uncle. He adds that Darnay's execution would inflict a further burden on him and Lucie who suffered so greatly during his imprisonment. Manette's plea is denied and Darnay is sentenced to death. (The Tale).

Lucie is depressed that Darnay has left without telling her why. Sydney at first is tempted to steal her from her husband, but realizes rather that the right thing would be to help Darnay (If Dreams Came True [Reprise]). Lucie wishes to die with her husband, but she realizes this may put her daughter in the same position she was in as a child. She vows to save both her husband and family yet still questions why Darnay left for France without telling her (Without a Word).

Sydney makes arrangements with his old acquaintance Barsad to allow him entrance into the prison where Darnay is held (The Bluff). Realizing that he cannot simply escape with Darnay, Sydney concocts a plan to save him, and to allow Little Lucie to have her father and a brilliant life ahead (Let Her Be a Child).

In Darnay's prison, after denying that he loves Lucie, Sydney switches clothes with Darnay and then drugs him, to the surprise of Barsad. Barsad delivers the unconscious Charles to Tellson's Bank, where his family is waiting. Lucie believes it is Sydney who has returned and reads a letter from him which is delivered by Barsad. In the letter, he explains he had to do this and that she has meant more to him than anything else in his entire life (The Letter).

With both sadness for Sydney and joy for the opportunity for her life with Charles, Lucie and her family quickly leave France. Madame Defarge arrives armed and vows to not let any of the Evremonde family escape. She and Miss Pross struggle over the pistol and Madame is killed. Ernest learns of Madame's death and calls-off the massive hunt for the Evremondes to have the opportunity to mourn his wife (Defarge Goodbye - Lament).

On the way to the gallows, a friendly and innocent seamstress realizes that Sydney is not Darnay, with whom she was imprisoned. However instead of betraying him, she calls him an angel and the two console each other. When she is called to the guillotine, Sydney bids her a final goodbye. He is next and as he climbs the stairs, he realizes the good that he has done for the woman who opened his eyes to so much love (Finale - I Can't Recall [Reprise]).

== Casts ==
Original principals in the Sarasota and Broadway productions were as follows:

Character	Indianapolis concerts	Sarasota	Broadway	Brighton cast
Sydney Carton	Alex Santoriello	James Barbour	James Barbour	James Barbour
Charles Darnay	Andrew Verala	Derek Keeling	Aaron Lazar	Simon Thomas
Lucie Manette	Christiane Noll	Jessica Rush	Brandi Burkhardt	Brandi Burkhardt
Dr. Alexandre Manette	Timothy Shew	Alex Santoriello	Gregg Edelman	J. Mark McVey
Jerry Cruncher	Craig Bennett	Craig Bennett	Craig Bennett	Howard Samuels
Ernest Defarge	J. Mark McVey	Joe Cassidy	Kevin Earley	Kevin Earley
Jarvis Lorry	—N/a	Michael Hayward-Jones	Michael Hayward-Jones	—N/a
The Seamstress	Bryce Dallas Howard	Alexandria Howley	MacKenzie Mauzy	Kelley Dorney
Miss Pross	—N/a	Katherine McGrath	Katherine McGrath	Rosemary Leach
Marquis St. Evrémonde	—N/a	Les Minski	Les Minski	Paul Baker
Madame Therese Defarge	Mary Gutzi	Natalie Toro	Natalie Toro	Natalie Toro
John Barsad	Nick Wyman	Nick Wyman	Nick Wyman	Ed Dixon
Little Lucie	Samantha Sharpe	Catherine Missal	Catherine Missal	Catherine Missal
Gabelle	—N/a	Kevin Greene	Kevin Greene	Lincoln Stone

== Musical numbers ==
Act I

- Prologue: The Shadows of the Night – Alexandre Manette and Lucie Manette
- The Way It Ought to Be – Madame Therese Defarge, Ernest Defarge and Men and Women of Paris
- You'll Never Be Alone – Dr. Manette and Lucie
- Argument – Marquis St. Evremonde and Charles Darnay
- Dover – Miss Pross, Jerry Cruncher and Sailors
- The Way It Ought to Be – Sydney Carton
- No Honest Way — John Barsad, Jerry, Sydney Carton and Scoundrels
- The Trial — Attorney General, Stryver, Jerry, Barsad, Sydney and Crowd
- Round and Round — Tavern Folk
- Reflection — Sydney
- The Way It Ought to Be (Reprise) — Madame
- Letter From Uncle — Marquis
- The Promise — Dr. Manette and Charles
- I Can't Recall — Sydney
- Resurrection Man — Jerry and Cronies
- Now at Last — Charles and Lucie
- If Dreams Came True — Charles and Sydney
- Out of Sight, Out of Mind — Madame
- I Always Knew — Gabelle and Charles
- Little One — Gaspard, Little Lucie, Sydney, Ernest and Men
- Until Tomorrow — Ernest, Madame, Sydney and Men and Women of Paris

Act II

- Everything Stays the Same — Madame, Ernest and Men and Women of Paris
- No Honest Way (Reprise) — Barsad
- The Tale — Madame, Dr. Manette, Young Man, Marquis and Crowd
- If Dreams Came True (Reprise) — Sydney, Charles
- Without a Word √ — Lucie
- The Bluff — Sydney and Barsad
- Let Her Be a Child — Sydney, Little Lucie and Charles
- The Letter — Sydney
- Lament — Ernest
- Finale: I Can't Recall — Seamstress, Sydney and Men and Women of Paris

√ Replaced with the Frank Wildhorn song "Never Say Goodbye" for the Brighton Concert.

Song Changes

- "Prologue: The Shadows of the Night" changed throughout previews. What originally began by Dr. Manette singing about his letter ended with just him being shown being pulled off the stage by two guards. The opening night version featured only Lucie.
- "Resurrection Man" was cut after several previews, and was not featured for the opening night performance.
- "Let Her Be a Child" was edited to its original form during previews, no longer featuring Charles Darnay.

== Awards and nominations ==
Drama Desk Award (2009)

- Outstanding Actor in a Musical (Nomination) - James Barbour
- Outstanding Orchestrations (Nomination) - Edward B. Kessel
- Outstanding Lighting Design in a Musical (Nomination) - Richard Pilbrow

Outer Critics Circle Award (2009)

- Outstanding New Musical (Nomination)
- Outstanding Actor in a Musical (Nomination) - James Barbour

Sarasota Magazine Theatre Awards (2008)

- Best Musical (WIN)
- Best Costume Design (WIN) - David Zinn
- Best Set Design (WIN) - Tony Walton
- Best Lighting Design (WIN) - Richard Pilbrow
- Best Music Direction (WIN) - Jerry Steichen
- Best Choreography (WIN) - Warren Carlyle
- Best Direction (WIN) - Michael Donald Edwards
- Best Supporting Actress (WIN) - Natalie Toro
- Best Supporting Actor (WIN) - Nick Wyman
- Best Actor (WIN-Tie) - James Barbour
- Best Actress (Nomination) - Jessica Rush
- Best Supporting Actor (Nomination) - Joe Cassidy

Florida's Curtain Call Awards (2008)

- Best Musical (WIN)
- Best Featured Actor in a Musical - Nick Wyman (WIN)

BroadwayWorld Fan-Choice Awards (2009)

- Best Featured Actress in a Musical (Nomination) - Natalie Toro (Runner-Up)
- Best Leading Actor in a Musical (Nomination) - James Barbour (Runner-Up)
- Best Leading Actress in a Musical (Nomination) - Brandi Burkhardt
- Best Lighting Design (Nomination) - Richard Pilbrow
- Best Costume Design (Nomination) - David Zinn (Runner-Up)
- Best Orchestrations (Nomination) - Edward B. Kessel
- Best Scenic Design (Nomination) - Tony Walton (Runner-Up)

== Recordings ==
In 2002, executive producers Sharpe & Russell released a concept recording, featuring Alex Santoriello as Sydney (and Dr. Manette), with Christiane Noll as Lucie, J. Mark McVey as Ernest DeFarge and Natalie Toro as Madame DeFarge.

A Tale of Two Cities: In Concert, starring James Barbour, Brandi Burkhardt, Natalie Toro and Kevin Earley of the Broadway company, with several other Americans and British ensemble and featured roles aired on television on PBS in December 2009, and is available on DVD. There is also a studio cast recording, an International Studio Cast of A Tale of Two Cities starring this cast, available.
