= Marquis St. Evrémonde =

- A Tale of Two Cities character
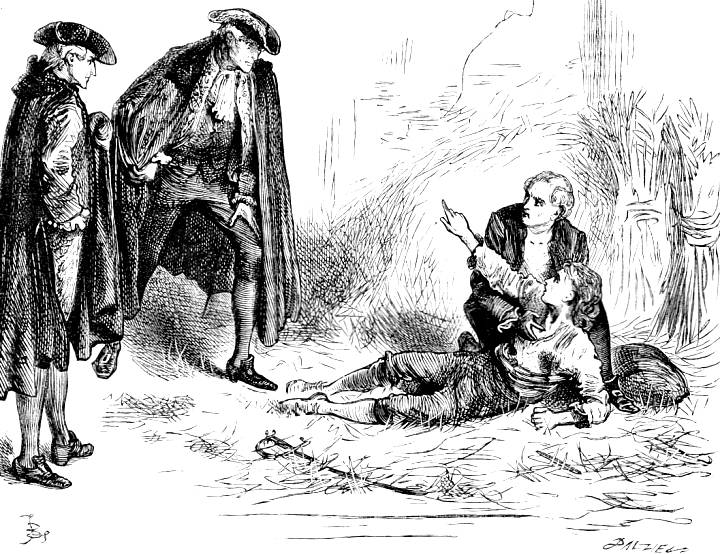
- The Evrémonde brothers (left) by Fred Barnard, 1870s
- Created by: Charles Dickens
- Portrayed by: Basil Rathbone

In-universe information
- Nickname: Monsieur the Marquis
- Gender: Male
- Title: Marquis
- Nationality: French

The Marquis St. Evrémonde is a fictional character in Charles Dickens' 1859 novel A Tale of Two Cities.

== Overview ==
The Marquis St. Evrémonde appears (in life) for only three chapters in Book the Second, symbolizing the pitiless, arrogant French aristocracy. About 60 years old, with a "face like a mask", he is Charles Darnay's uncle and twin brother of Charles Darnay's father (deceased).

=== Marquis in Paris ===
While still handsome, fashionable, and exquisitely poised, the Marquis St. Evrémonde is out of favor at the royal court for reasons that are not specified. In the chapter "Monseigneur in Town", the Marquis is coldy greeted by a Monseigneur (a great lord and senior courtier) at a Parisian reception. Snubbed, he waits until everyone from the gathering leaves and then murmurs a curse sending the Monseigneur to the Devil (the curse is uttered in a mirrored salon, possibly suggesting that it rebounds onto the speaker). His carriage then heads for his country chateau, through the streets of Paris, at the break-neck pace favored by nobility. Although most pedestrians scatter in fear, his carriage runs over a small child, the son of a man named Gaspard. The Marquis shows no remorse at the sight of the crushed little body — inquiring whether his horses are all right — and, "with the air of a gentleman who had accidentally broke some common thing, and had paid for it", throws a gold coin to the distraught father. Nearby, wine shop owners The Defarges approach the scene - Ernest Defarge to comfort the grieving Gaspard; Madame Defarge to stand and stare boldly in the face of the Marquis and knit his Fate. The remainder of the crowd watches in silence but an unknown hand throws the coin back into the carriage. Before driving on, the Marquis responds with cold contempt that he would willingly ride over any of "you dogs" and exterminate them. This scene foreshadows the oncoming revolution in France.

=== Marquis at his estate ===
The Marquis St. Evrémonde appears in the two following chapters: "Monseigneur in the Country" (when he is told by a road worker that a dust-covered figure was hanging on to the bottom of his carriage) and "The Gorgon's Head" (dining with his nephew, Charles Darnay). Dickens uses the account of the journey of the Marquis through the countryside to graphically describe the poverty and desperation of the peasantry.

During the dinner between uncle and nephew, Charles Darnay apologizes for being detained in London. He alludes to his danger there (his recent treason trial) wondering aloud if his uncle orchestrated the accusations brought against him. Darnay further suggests that if the Marquis were still in the French Court's good graces, he could obtain a lettre de cachet and have his nephew imprisoned in France. His uncle confesses that he would do so for the honor of the family.

The dinner conversation between uncle and nephew reveals their diametrically opposed view of the rural peasantry. St. Evrémonde considers it an obligation of his family station to subjugate "the vulgar" ("Repression is the only lasting philosophy…"). He regrets that recent reforms have placed restraints on the absolute power of his class to abuse their inferiors, recalling a tale where a peasant had been poniarded in a neighboring room for "professing some insolent delicacy respecting his daughter". Darnay, by contrast, hopes to honor his mother's dying wish by reversing the wrongs their family has caused. When his uncle laughs at this, Darney renounces his rights to the Evrémonde title and lands, in favor of a new life in London. His uncle already knows that this "new life" includes an emigrant doctor (Dr. Alexandre Manette) and his daughter (Lucie Manette).

They retire for the night.

=== Death of the Marquis and aftermath ===
At the conclusion of Chapter 9, the Marquis is found stabbed to death in his bed. “The Gorgon had surveyed the building again in the night, and had added the one stone face wanting; the stone face for which it had waited through about two hundred years." (Chapter 9). All of his property is inherited by Darnay, who remains in London but instructs an agent to redress grievances, as much as is possible in the growing confusion of the pending revolution.

A year later, Gaspard, father of the child trampled by the carriage and assassin of the Marquis, is captured and executed. His body is left hanging above the village water fountain. Subsequently the Evrémonde chateau is burned to the ground at night by "Jacques" revolutionaries while the villagers watch in silence and the officers of a neighboring royal garrison stand helpless because they know that their soldiers will likely no longer obey orders.

Only later in the novel, during the trial of Charles Darnay, is the secret of the Marquis and his brother exposed: Alexandre Manette's diary from the Bastille details how, in 1767, the Evrémonde brothers had abducted and abused a pregnant peasant woman, causing her death; fatally wounded her brother who tried to protect her and brought about the deaths of the woman's husband and her father. Manette tries to alert the authorities to the Evrémonde crimes but his letter is passed on to the brothers instead. Thus he was imprisoned in the Bastille and was the reason for a lifelong hatred of the Evrémondes by the last member of the wronged girl's family - her sister, Madame Defarge, who married Manette's servant Ernest Defarge.

=== Names ===
The Marquis St. Evrémonde is referred to as "Monseigneur" and "Monsieur." These three different titles all refer to the same person: people who are below the Marquis in rank refer to him as "Monseigneur" or "Monsieur," while people of equal rank refer to him as "Marquis."

The note on the knife in the Marquis's chest is signed "Jacques;" a common nickname used by the aristocracy for the peasant was "Jacquerie".

== Cinematic and theatrical portrayals ==
In the 2008 Broadway musical adaptation of 'A Tale of Two Cities,' the Marquis St. Evrémonde is played by Les Minski.

On film he has been played by such actors as Basil Rathbone (1935) and Christopher Lee (1958). In 2003, the Rathbone portrayal of St. Evrémonde was nominated for AFI's 100 Years...100 Heroes and Villains as one of the Top 50 Villains.

On television, he has been portrayed by Barry Morse (1980), Max Adrian (1958), Jerome Willis (1965), Heron Carvic (1957), Morris Perry (1980) and Jean-Marc Bory (1989).

On radio he has been portrayed by John Moffatt and Clive Merrison.
