= James Barbour (singer) =

American singer and Broadway actor

- Born: James Stacy Barbour; April 25, 1966 (age 60); Cherry Hill, New Jersey, U.S.
- Other name: Mr Barbour
- Education: Hofstra University
- Occupations: Actor, singer
- Years active: 1993–present
- Criminal charges: Two counts of endangering the welfare of a child
- Criminal penalty: 36 days in prison (2008); three years of probation
- Spouse: Dana Stackpole
- Children: 2

James Barbour (born April 25, 1966) is an American singer and theatre actor who played the title role in the Broadway production of The Phantom of the Opera from February 2015 until December 2017. Among his other credits are the Beast in Beauty and the Beast, Edward Rochester in Jane Eyre and Sydney Carton in A Tale of Two Cities, for which he was nominated for a Drama Desk Award.

In 2008, Barbour pleaded guilty to two counts of endangering the welfare of a child, and he admitted to engaging in sexual activities with a 15-year-old on more than one occasion.

== Early life and education ==
Barbour was born April 25, 1966, in Cherry Hill, New Jersey. He graduated from Hofstra University, where he majored in English and Theatre with a minor in Philosophy and Physics.

== Career ==
Barbour made his Broadway debut in 1993, in the production of Cyrano: The Musical. He also played Billy Bigelow in Carousel in 1994 and the Beast in Beauty and the Beast in 1998. He was nominated for a Drama League Award in the Outstanding Actor In A Musical category for his role as Edward Rochester in Jane Eyre. He played Leon Czolgosz in Assassins. He also appeared in the Broadway production of Urinetown, and in the national tours of The Secret Garden and Camelot. He also co-founded Laughing Dog Entertainment with the theatre director Steve Binder.

He played Lancelot in the 2005 Hollywood Bowl production of Camelot. In late 2007, he performed the role of Sydney Carton in a pre-Broadway musical adaptation of Charles Dickens' A Tale of Two Cities at the Asolo Repertory Theatre in Sarasota, Florida. In 2008, Barbour reprised his role in the Broadway production of A Tale of Two Cities, which closed after 60 performances. In the New York Times, critic Ben Brantley wrote that he disliked both the production and Barbour's performance in it. Barbour was nominated for the Drama League, Drama Desk, and Outer Critics Circle Awards in the Best Actor in a Musical category for his role in A Tale of Two Cities.

In 2011, it was announced that he would play the supporting role of Jack Favel in the Broadway musical adaptation of Rebecca. The production was plagued with legal and financial problems, and the production has been indefinitely postponed after multiple delays. In the summer of 2014, he starred as Jean Valjean in the La Mirada Theatre for the Performing Arts production of Les Misérables opposite Anthony Fedorov as Enjolras. Barbour then played the title role in the Broadway production of The Phantom of the Opera for nearly three years, from February 2015 until December 2017.

He launched a holiday concert series at New York's Sardi's Restaurant in 2008. Each performance featured a guest performer, including Brandi Burkhardt, Natalie Toro, Deborah Gibson, Marla Schaffel, Marc Kudisch, and Kevin Earley. He repeated the holidays concerts in 2009 in both New York and Los Angeles. In 2010, he expanded these concerts to six cities. He followed this with a second Sardi's concert series, "Love Songs", featuring numerous Broadway classics. The annual holiday concert series has since moved to Birdland, a Manhattan jazz club.

In March 2017, Barbour's likeness was immortalized in a caricature portrait on the wall at Sardi's. The same year, he finished writing The Ghosts of the Majestic, a solo show about John Raitt, Robert Goulet, and Ezio Pinza, three notable actors that performed at the Majestic Theatre.

== Personal life ==
Barbour is married to fellow performer Dana Stackpole, with whom he has two daughters.

He has been an Artist Committee Board member of The Actors Fund of America for since 2000 during which time he has performed many charitable fundraisers in support of the Fund and Broadway Cares/ Equity Fights AIDS. In 2014, he gave a fundraising performance for Scientology. He has given benefit concerts for his alma mater, Hofstra University.

=== Arrest ===
In April 2006, Barbour was arrested and charged with five counts of sexual abuse and sodomy, after a woman accused him of committing statutory rape against her in 2001, when she was 15 years old. In December 2006 he was indicted by a grand jury in New York for said crime.

In January 2008, Barbour pleaded guilty to two misdemeanor counts of endangering the welfare of a minor in exchange for a lesser sentence in jail and three years' probation. Also, in accordance with his plea bargain, Barbour made a public allocution to these misdemeanors. He served his sentence at Rikers Island, which lasted for 36 days beginning on February 29, 2008.

== Broadway appearances ==
- Cyrano: The Musical as Ensemble (1993)
- Carousel as Billy Bigelow (1994)
- Beauty and the Beast as The Beast (1998–1999)
- Jane Eyre as Edward (2000)
- Urinetown as Officer Lockstock (2003)
- Assassins as Leon Czolgosz (2004 & 2012)
- A Tale of Two Cities as Sydney Carton (2008)
- Camelot as Lancelot (2011) - Concert
- Oliver! as Bill Sykes (2012) - Concert
- The Phantom of the Opera as The Phantom of the Opera (2015-2017)

== Filmography ==
- Beauty and the Beast: A Concert on Ice (1996) (TV)
- The Real Adventures of Jonny Quest (1996) (TV)
- Cyrano: The Musical (1997) (TV)
- Just Shoot Me! (1997) (TV)
- Houdini (1998)
- Sex and the City (1999) (TV)
- Twinkle Toes (1999)
- The District (2000) (TV)
- That's Life (2001) (TV)
- Eight Crazy Nights (2002)
- Ed (2003) (TV)
- Alchemy (2005)

== Discography ==
- Bring Me Giants (2010)
- A Gift of Christmas (2009)
- A Tale of Two Cities, The Musical: International Studio Cast Recording (2008)
- Broadway in Concert (with Hershey Felder) (2007)
- Dracula: The Musical Concept Recording
- Jane Eyre – Original Cast Recording
- Assassins – Broadway Cast Recording
- Love Songs
- The Gift

== Awards ==
- 2001 Drama League Award – Edward Rochester, Jane Eyre ~ The Musical (WIN)
- 2006/7 LA Weekly Garland Award – Back From Broadway (WIN)
- 2007 Sarasota Magazine Award for Best Actor in a Musical – Sydney Carton, A Tale of Two Cities (WIN – Tie)
- 2008-2009 BroadwayWorld Fan Choice Award for Best Actor in a Musical – Sydney Carton, A Tale of Two Cities (Finalist /Runner-Up )
- 2009 Outer Critics Circle Award for Best Actor in a Musical – Sydney Carton, A Tale of Two Cities (Nomination)
- 2009 Drama Desk Award for Best Actor in a Musical – Sydney Carton, A Tale of Two Cities (Nomination)
