= Cruncher =

Cruncher may refer to:

- Jerry Cruncher, a character in the novel A Tale of Two Cities by Charles Dickens
- Coban Lookchaomaesaitong (born 1966), Thai former Muay Thai kickboxer nicknamed "The Cruncher"
- Larry Zbyszko (born 1951), American professional wrestler who called himself the "Cruncher"
- Snickers Cruncher bar, a variation of the Snickers chocolate bar
