= Jerry Cruncher =

Fictional character from A Tale of Two Cities

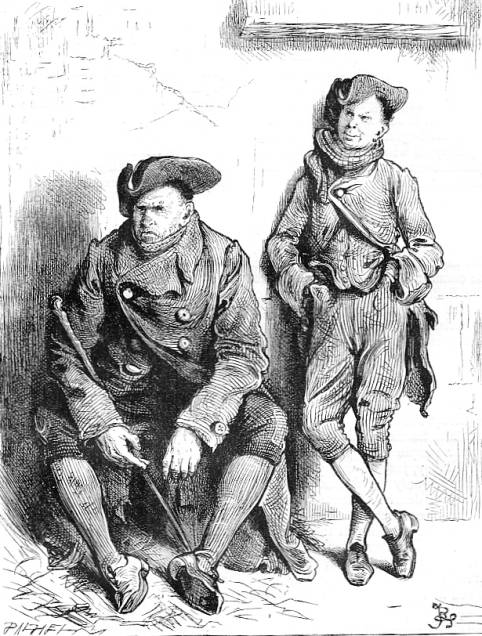
Messrs. Cruncher and Son by Fred Barnard (1870s)

Jeremiah Cruncher is a fictional character in Charles Dickens' 1859 novel A Tale of Two Cities.

== Overview ==
Jeremiah "Jerry" Cruncher is employed as a porter for Tellson's Bank of London. He earns extra money as a resurrection man removing bodies from their graves for sale to medical schools and students as cadavers. During the story, Jerry Cruncher accompanies Jarvis Lorry and Lucie Manette to Paris to retrieve Dr. Alexandre Manette. Back in England, he helps Sydney Carton "get something" on the paid government witness and spy, John Barsad. He accompanies Lucie and Miss Pross to church the night they run into Sydney Carton and later that night Cruncher tries to unsuccessfully "resurrect" Barsad's colleague and fellow spy Roger Cly in the graveyard. Later in Paris, Jerry will remember that Cly was not in his coffin and will pass this information onto Carton who will use it to blackmail Barsad into getting Carton into the prison to rescue Charles Darnay who has been imprisoned by revolutionaries. Before leaving Paris, Cruncher will renounce grave robbing and resolve to be more gentle with his wife, toward whom he had been abusive physically and verbally.

== Cinematic and theatrical portrayals ==
In the 1935 film adaptation, Jerry Cruncher is portrayed by Billy Bevan.

In the 1958 film adaptation, Jerry Cruncher is portrayed by Alfie Bass.

In the 1980 TV Movie A Tale of Two Cities, Jerry Cruncher is portrayed by George Innes.

In the 2008 Broadway musical adaptation of 'A Tale of Two Cities,' Jerry Cruncher was played by Craig Bennett.
