= Cinderella (2013 cast album) =

Rodgers + Hammerstein's Cinderella

Soundtrack album cast recording by Various
- Released: May 7, 2013
- Length: 58:03
- Label: Ghostlight Records

Rodgers + Hammerstein's Cinderella is an original cast album of the first Broadway production of the musical Cinderella, with music by Richard Rodgers, lyrics by Oscar Hammerstein II and a book by Douglas Carter Beane based partly on Hammerstein's 1957 book. The story is based upon the fairy tale Cinderella, particularly the French version Cendrillon, ou la Petite Pantoufle de Vair, by Charles Perrault. The production opened in 2013. In Beane's plot, Cinderella opens Prince Topher's eyes to the injustice in the kingdom.

The original cast album produced by Ghostlight Records was recorded on March 17-18, 2013 at MSR Studios, New York City, released digitally on May 7, 2013 and released in physical format on June 4, 2013. The album includes the best-known songs from the original version of the musical and also features four songs from the Rodgers and Hammerstein catalogue, including "Now Is the Time", cut from South Pacific. The cast includes Laura Osnes in the title role, Santino Fontana as the Prince, Victoria Clark as crazy Marie/the Fairy Godmother, Harriet Harris as Cinderella's stepmother, Peter Bartlett as the Prime Minister, Ann Harada and Marla Mindelle as stepsisters Charlotte and Gabrielle, and Greg Hildreth as the rebel Jean-Michel.

No.	Title	Characters	Length
1.	"Overture"	Orchestra	2:25
2.	"Prologue"	Ella, Ensemble	1:24
3.	"Me, Who Am I?"	Topher, Lord Pinkleton, Sebastian, Knights	2:24
4.	"In My Own Little Corner"	Ella	3:17
5.	"The Prince Is Giving a Ball / Now Is the Time"	Sebastian, Topher, Lord Pinkleton, Jean-Michel, Townspeople, Ella	6:34
6.	"In My Own Little Corner (Reprise)"	Ella, Marie	3:39
7.	"Impossible"	Marie, Ella	2:21
8.	"Transformations"	Orchestra	2:10
9.	"It's Possible"	Marie, Ella	1:25
10.	"Ten Minutes Ago"	Topher, Ella	2:52
11.	"Cinderella Waltz"	Orchestra	2:24
12.	"Ten Minutes Ago (Reprise)"	Topher, Ella, Ensemble	1:40
13.	"Stepsister's Lament"	Charlotte, Ladies of the Court	2:40
14.	"The Pursuit"	Topher, Lord Pinkleton, Lords of the Court	4:26
15.	"He Was Tall"	Ella	1:30
16.	"When You're Driving Through the Moonlight"	Ella, Madame, Charlotte, Gabrielle	2:55
17.	"A Lovely Night"	Ella, Madame, Charlotte, Gabrielle	2:31
18.	"A Lovely Night (Reprise)"	Ella, Gabrielle	0:49
19.	"Loneliness of Evening"	Topher, Ella	1:53
20.	"Announcing the Banquet"	Sebastian, Lord Pinkleton, Heralds, Madame	1:26
21.	"There's Music in You"	Marie	3:14
22.	"Do I Love You Because You're Beautiful?"	Topher, Ella	2:37
23.	"The Shoe Fits"	Lord Pinkleton and Company	1:32
24.	"The Proposal"	Topher, Ella, Company	1:07
25.	"The Wedding: There's Music in You"	Lord Pinkleton, Marie, Company	2:50
26.	"Exit Music: Cinderella March"	Orchestra	1:18

== Reception ==
[To come]
