= Cyrano: The Musical =

Cyrano
- The Musical
- Original Broadway Playbill
- Music: Ad van Dijk
- Lyrics: Koen van Dijk (Dutch lyrics); Peter Reeves (English lyrics); Sheldon Harnick (additional English lyrics)
- Book: Koen van Dijk
- Basis: Cyrano de Bergerac by Edmond Rostand
- Productions: 1992 Amsterdam; 1993 Broadway

Cyrano: The Musical is a musical with music by Ad van Dijk, an original book and lyrics (in Dutch) by Koen van Dijk. For the Broadway production, English lyrics were provided by Peter Reeves, with additional lyrics by Sheldon Harnick.

Produced by Joop van den Ende, the original Dutch production Cyrano de Musical premiered in 1992 at the Stadsschouwburg (City Theatre) in Amsterdam. It is based on Edmond Rostand's classic 1897 play of the same name focusing on a love triangle involving the large-nosed poetic Cyrano de Bergerac, his beautiful cousin Roxane, and his classically handsome but inarticulate friend Christian de Neuvillette who, unaware of Cyrano's unrequited passion for Roxane, imposes upon him to provide the romantic words he can use to woo her successfully in mid-17th century Paris.

After 38 previews, the Broadway production, directed by Eddy Habbema, opened on November 21, 1993, at the Neil Simon Theatre, where it ran for 137 performances. The cast included Bill van Dijk as Cyrano, Anne Runolfsson as Roxane, and Paul Anthony Stewart as Christian, with James Barbour and Jeff Gardner in supporting roles. Timothy Nolen played Comte de Guiche and later took over the role of Cyrano. Robert Guillaume also took over the title role during the run.

The production garnered Tony Award nominations for Best Musical, Best Book of a Musical, Best Original Score, and Best Costume Design.

In addition to the Netherlands and the United States, the musical has been produced in Belgium, Germany, and Japan. Despite the show's critical success, no Broadway recording was ever produced.

== Song list ==
Act I

- Prologue - Man, Le Bret, Ragueneau, Ensemble
- Opera, Opera - Ensemble
- Aria - Montfleury, Cyrano, Ensemble
- One Fragment of a Moment - Christian, Roxane
- Confrontation - Ensemble
- The Duel - Cyrano, Ensemble
- Where's All This Anger Coming From - Le Bret, Cyrano
- Loving Her - Cyrano, Christian
- A Message from Roxane - Chaperone, Cyrano
- Ragueneau's Patisserie - Ragueneau, Chefs, Waitresses
- Roxane's Confession - Roxane, Cyrano
- What a Reward - De Guiche, Le Bret, Ragueneau
- Hate Me - Cyrano
- Courage Makes a Man - Cadets, Captain
- Cyrano's Story - Cyrano, Christian
- A Letter for Roxane - Cyrano, Christian
- I Have No Words - Christian
- Two Musketeers - Cyrano, Christian
- An Evening Made for Lovers - Ensemble
- Balcony Scene - Roxane, Christian, Cyrano
- Poetry - Cyrano, Roxane
- Moonsong - Cyrano
- Stay With Me! - Ensemble

Act II

- Every Day, Every Night - Cyrano, Christian, Roxane, Cadets
- A White Sash - De Guiche, Cyrano, Cadets
- When I Write - Cyrano
- Two Musketeers (Reprise) - Christian, Cyrano
- Rhyming Menu - Roxane, Rogueneau, Ensemble
- Even Then - Roxane
- Tell Her Now - Christian, Cyrano
- The Evening - Cyrano, Cadets
- Even Then (Reprise) - Roxane, Cyrano
- The Battle - Ensemble
- Everything You Wrote - Roxane
- He Loves To Make Us Laugh - Nuns, Mother Superior
- A Visit from De Guiche - De Guiche, Roxane, Mother Superior
- Opera, Opera (Reprise) - Ensemble
- An Old Wound/The Letter/Moonsong - Cyrano, Roxane

== Awards and nominations ==
=== Original Broadway production ===
Year	Award ceremony	Category	Nominee	Result
1994	Tony Award	Best Musical		Nominated
1994	Tony Award	Best Book of a Musical	Koen Van Dijk	Nominated
1994	Tony Award	Best Original Score	Koen Van Dijk, Peter Reeves, Sheldon Harnick, Ad Van Dijk	Nominated
1994	Tony Award	Best Costume Design	Yan Tax	Nominated
