= Cinderella (Rodgers and Hammerstein musical) =

Musical by Rodgers and Hammerstein

- Original image (1957) for DVD
- Also known as: Rodgers & Hammerstein's Cinderella
- Based on: Cinderella by Charles Perrault
- Written by: Oscar Hammerstein II
- Directed by: Ralph Nelson
- Starring: Julie Andrews; Jon Cypher; Edith Adams; Kaye Ballard; Alice Ghostley
- Composer: Richard Rodgers
- Country of origin: United States

Production
- Producer: Richard Lewine
- Running time: 76 min

Original release
- Network: CBS
- Release: March 31, 1957

Rodgers and Hammerstein's Cinderella is a musical written for television, but later played on stage, with music by Richard Rodgers and a book and lyrics by Oscar Hammerstein II. It is based upon the fairy tale Cinderella, particularly the French version Cendrillon, ou la petite pantoufle de verre ("Cinderella, or The Little Glass Slipper"), by Charles Perrault. The story concerns a young woman forced into a life of servitude by her cruel stepmother and self-centered stepsisters, who dreams of a better life. With the help of her fairy godmother, Cinderella is transformed into a princess and finds true love with the kingdom's prince.

Cinderella is the only Rodgers and Hammerstein musical written for television. It was originally broadcast live in color on CBS on March 31, 1957, as a vehicle for Julie Andrews, who played the title role. The broadcast was viewed by more than 100 million people. It was subsequently remade for television twice, in 1965 and 1997. The 1965 version starred Lesley Ann Warren and Stuart Damon. The 1997 version starred Brandy in the title role, with Whitney Houston as the fairy godmother. Both remakes add songs from other Richard Rodgers musicals and have adaptations to the Hammerstein book.

The musical has been adapted for the stage in a number of versions, including a London West End pantomime adaptation, one produced by New York City Opera that follows the original television version closely, and various touring productions. A 2013 adaptation on Broadway starred Laura Osnes and Santino Fontana, with a new book by Douglas Carter Beane; since then, it has been revived in the US and internationally.

== Background ==
In the 1950s, television adaptations of stage musicals were fairly common. In 1955, NBC broadcast the Broadway musical Peter Pan, starring Mary Martin. It was a hit, and the network looked for more family-oriented musical projects. Richard Rodgers had won an Emmy Award for his score to Victory at Sea, a documentary series about World War II, and several of his musicals with Oscar Hammerstein II, as well their film State Fair, had achieved outstanding success. NBC approached Rodgers and Hammerstein and asked them to do something never previously attempted: write an original musical expressly for television (rather than merely adapting an existing one to the television special format). The team decided to adapt the fairy tale Cinderella.

As they were new to television musicals, they sought the advice of an industry insider, Richard Lewine, the Vice President in charge of color television at CBS and a cousin of Richard Rodgers. He told Rodgers and Hammerstein that CBS was also seeking a musical project and had already signed Julie Andrews, who was then starring in My Fair Lady on Broadway. Rodgers recalled, in his autobiography: "What sold us immediately was the chance to work with Julie." Rodgers and Hammerstein signed with CBS. The two retained ownership of the show and had control over casting, direction, set and costumes, while CBS controlled the technical aspects of the broadcast and had an option for a second broadcast. CBS announced the production in September 1956. In adapting the familiar fairy tale, "Rodgers and Hammerstein stayed faithful to the original Charles Perrault" version. In an interview with Time magazine, Hammerstein said, "It took me seven months to write the book and lyrics". He told the Saturday Review: "We want the kids who see it to recognize the story they know. Children can be very critical on that score. But, of course, their parents will be watching too, so we have tried to humanize the characters without altering the familiar plot structure."

== Synopsis ==
=== Act I ===
In the village square, the Herald proclaims: "The Prince Is Giving a Ball" to celebrate Prince Christopher's 21st birthday, an age appropriate for him to marry. The ladies of the kingdom are thrilled at the prospect of meeting him. Cinderella, whose father has died, is treated as a servant by her ill-tempered and selfish stepmother and two stepsisters, Joy and Portia. She carries their tall stack of shopping parcels home for them, as they bully and order her about. Left alone in her corner near the fire, she dreams of an exotic life as a princess or anything other than a servant ("In My Own Little Corner"). Meanwhile, the King and Queen prepare for the big celebration ("Royal Dressing Room Scene"), and the servants discuss the food and other planning ("Your Majesties"). The royals hope their son will meet a suitable bride at the Ball, but the Prince is apprehensive about meeting all the eager women of the kingdom. The Queen is touched by overhearing the King's pep-talk to his son and tells the king she loves him ("Boys and Girls Like You and Me").

As Cinderella's stepsisters get ready for the Ball, hoping that they will catch the Prince's eye, they laugh at Cinderella's dreams. After they leave, Cinderella imagines having gone with them ("In My Own Little Corner" (reprise)). Her Fairy Godmother appears and is moved by Cinderella's irresistible and powerfully-held wish to go to the Ball. She magically transforms the girl's plain clothing into a beautiful gown and her little mouse friends and a pumpkin into a glittering carriage with footmen ("Impossible; It's Possible"); Cinderella leaves for the Ball.

=== Act II ===
Cinderella arrives at the palace at 11:30; before she enters, her Godmother warns her not to stay past midnight. The Prince is bored by the attention of all the young ladies with whom he has had to dance, including the stepsisters ("Gavotte"). Cinderella's radiant entrance immediately attracts everyone's attention, but her transformation is so complete that no one recognizes her. The Prince is intrigued. They dance together and instantly fall in love ("Ten Minutes Ago"). Seeing the Prince with a beauty whom they do not recognize, the stepsisters ruefully ask each other why he wouldn't prefer a "usual" girl like them ("Stepsisters' Lament"). As the Prince and Cinderella dance, he declares his love for her ("Do I Love You Because You're Beautiful?"). As they embrace, the clock strikes midnight, and Cinderella flees before the magic wears off, but in her haste she leaves behind a glass slipper.

=== Act III ===
The next morning, Cinderella's stepmother and stepsisters reminisce about the Ball and find Cinderella's "imagination" surprisingly accurate about what it must have been like going to the Ball ("When You're Driving Through the Moonlight") and dancing with the Prince ("A Lovely Night"). Meanwhile, despite his parents' cautions about a girl he just met, the Prince is searching for the owner of the slipper who fled so hurriedly from the Ball. The Herald tries the slipper on all the women of the kingdom ("The Search"). At Cinderella's house, the slipper will not fit any of the ladies. Cinderella's stepmother works to steer the Herald away from Cinderella, but she is not home; she is hiding in the Palace garden. The Herald returns to the palace to inform the Prince that he has not found the missing girl. The Herald then sees Cinderella hiding and places her under arrest. Prodded by the Fairy Godmother, he tries the slipper on Cinderella. It fits, and the Prince is called back to the garden where he recognizes his beloved ("Do I Love You Because You're Beautiful?" (reprise)). The stepmother and stepsisters are now very solicitous and help Cinderella prepare for her wedding; she and the Prince marry with resplendent pomp, as her Fairy Godmother observes that "impossible things are happening every day".

== Musical numbers ==
The original version contains the following songs:

Act I

- "Overture" – Orchestra
- "The Prince Is Giving a Ball" – Town Crier and Chorus
- "Cinderella March" – Orchestra
- "In My Own Little Corner" – Cinderella
- "The Prince Is Giving a Ball" (reprise) – Chorus
- "Your Majesties" (Royal Dressing Room Scene) – King, Queen, Chef and Steward
- "In My Own Little Corner" (reprise) – Cinderella
- "Impossible; It's Possible" – Fairy Godmother and Cinderella

Act II

- "Gavotte" – Orchestra
- "Ten Minutes Ago" – Prince and Cinderella
- "Stepsisters' Lament" – Stepsisters
- "Waltz for a Ball" – Chorus
- "Do I Love You Because You're Beautiful?" – Prince and Cinderella
- "Never in a Thousand Years" (eventually omitted from the production)

Act III

- "When You're Driving Through the Moonlight" – Cinderella, Stepmother and Stepsisters
- "A Lovely Night" – Cinderella, Stepmother and Stepsisters
- "The Search" – Orchestra
- "Do I Love You Because You're Beautiful?" (reprise) – Prince
- "Wedding" – Orchestra, Fairy Godmother and Chorus

In some productions, additional numbers added include "Loneliness of Evening" (cut from South Pacific and introduced in the 1965 broadcast), a song for the prince; and "Boys and Girls like You and Me" (cut from Oklahoma! and subsequently other shows), for the queen and king (in the Royal Dressing Room Scene), which appears in the show's published vocal score. The 1993 New York City Opera production added "My Best Love", written for Flower Drum Song and "If I Weren't King", a song cut from the original broadcast, both for the King. The 1997 TV adaptation added "Falling in Love with Love" for the Stepmother, "The Sweetest Sounds" for Cinderella and the Prince, and "There's Music in You" (written for Main Street to Broadway), for the Fairy Godmother. The 2013 Broadway production was performed in two acts and included the songs "Me, Who Am I?" (cut from Me & Juliet), "Loneliness of Evening" and "Now Is the Time" (cut from South Pacific), "The Pursuit", and "There's Music in You" (written for the film Main Street to Broadway).

== Television productions ==
=== 1957 original production ===
The musical had to fit into the 90-minute TV program with six commercial breaks, so the show was divided into six short acts. Rehearsals started on February 21, 1957. Director Ralph Nelson and choreographer Jonathan Lucas, who had choreographed for The Milton Berle Show, were both experienced with musical material on television. The orchestrations were by Rodgers' longtime collaborator Robert Russell Bennett. Alfredo Antonini, a veteran with CBS, conducted and served as music director. In early March, the company moved to CBS Television Color Studio 72, the first CBS-TV color studio in New York and the smallest color studio in the CBS empire at the time. The 56 performers, 33 musicians and 80 stagehands and crew were crammed into the small studio together with four giant RCA TK-40A color TV cameras, a wardrobe of up to 100 costumes, over half a dozen huge set pieces, special effects equipment and numerous props. The orchestra played in a small room with special equipment to overcome the suppressed acoustics. One of the four color TV cameras failed during the live telecast, adding to the production's technical difficulties. CBS invested in a massive marketing campaign, as did the sponsors, Pepsi-Cola and the Shulton Company (then maker of Old Spice). Ed Sullivan also promoted Cinderella, which would be seen in his usual Sunday night time slot, with an appearance by Rodgers and Hammerstein on his show the previous Sunday. Many of the songs were released on records and to radio stations to familiarize the prospective audience with the music. The broadcast was produced for $376,000, more than double the sum usually spent on a TV production at that time.

On March 31, 1957, at 8:00 pm Eastern time, Cinderella was broadcast live in the Eastern, Central and Mountain time zones in both black and white and compatible color; the West Coast received a delayed black and white-only broadcast starting at 8:00 pm Pacific time. Beyond the United States, it was carried by CBS affiliates in the U.S. territories of Alaska, Hawaii and Puerto Rico; in Canada it was broadcast on CBC. It starred Andrews in the title role and Jon Cypher as The Prince, and featured Howard Lindsay as The King, Dorothy Stickney as The Queen, Edie Adams as the Fairy Godmother, Kaye Ballard and Alice Ghostley as stepsisters Portia and Joy, Ilka Chase as the Stepmother, and Iggie Wolfington as The Steward. Joe Layton appeared uncredited in the ensemble. There were no understudies. Rodgers had told TV Guide, "If Julie can't make the show, then neither can we."

The Nielsen TV rating for the program was 18,864,000 "homes reached during an average minute" of the broadcast. More than 107 million viewers in more than 60% of American households, saw the broadcast. Andrews was nominated for an Emmy Award for her performance, as was Rodgers for the score. An original cast album was released to stores the morning after the broadcast. Rodgers and Hammerstein's plans to bring an expanded version of the musical to Broadway never materialized, though their last two shows together, Flower Drum Song and The Sound of Music, each contain a rags-to-riches story for the heroine. A black and white kinescope of the March 17, 1957, dress rehearsal survives (it was thought discarded but was rediscovered in 2002) and the West Coast telecast has been issued on DVD.

=== 1965 version ===
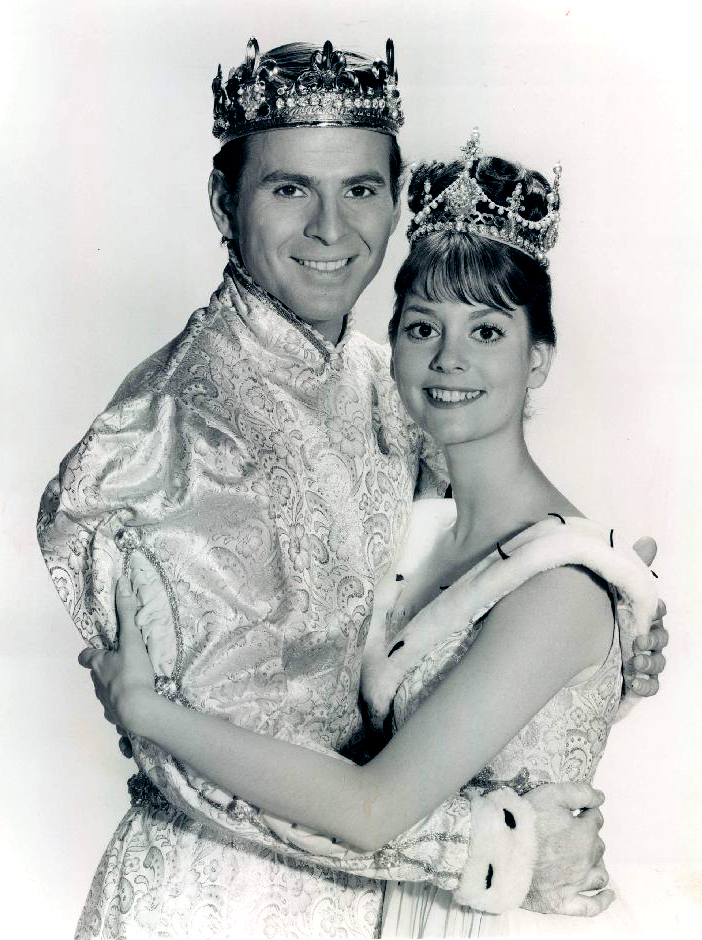
Stuart Damon as the Prince and Lesley Ann Warren as Cinderella

The 1957 premiere had been broadcast before color videotape was available, so only one performance could be shown. After the musical's success in London and elsewhere as a stage production, CBS decided to produce another television version in 1965, with Richard Rodgers as Executive Producer and a teleplay revised by Joseph Schrank (Hammerstein had died in 1960). The new script hewed closer to the traditional tale, although nearly all of the original songs were retained and sung in their original settings. A new sequence opens the story: the Prince stops at Cinderella's house with his retinue for a drink of water after returning from his travels. Cinderella, home alone, and not knowing who the handsome traveler is until a page utters the words "Your Highness", kindly gives the Prince water from the well. After the Prince leaves, he sings "Loneliness of Evening", which had been composed for South Pacific in 1949 but not used in that musical. The names of the stepsisters were changed from the original production, the Royal Dressing Room Scene was omitted, and the fairy godmother reveals herself immediately, instead of resisting Cinderella's first wishes to attend the ball.

The 1965 version was directed by Charles S. Dubin with choreography by Eugene Loring and recorded on videotape (at CBS Television City in Hollywood) for later broadcast. The cast featured Ginger Rogers and Walter Pidgeon as the Queen and King; Celeste Holm as the Fairy Godmother; Jo Van Fleet as the Stepmother, with Pat Carroll and Barbara Ruick as her daughters Prunella and Esmerelda; and Stuart Damon as the Prince. Lesley Ann Warren, at age 18, played the title role. The film also features rare on-camera appearances by dubbers Betty Noyes and Bill Lee, who play a couple that briefly sing about their daughter (played by Trudi Ames). The first broadcast was on February 22, 1965, and it was rebroadcast eight times through February 1974. The 1965 debut had a Nielsen rating of 42.3, making it the highest-rated non-sports special on CBS from the beginning of the Nielsen ratings until 2009, and the 50th highest-rated show of any kind during that period.

=== 1997 version ===
The successful 1993 CBS adaptation Gypsy, starring Bette Midler and produced by Craig Zadan and Neil Meron, revived interest in TV musicals. The day after Gypsy's original broadcast, Whitney Houston approached the producers to suggest a similar starring vehicle for herself. Zadan and Meron suggested Rodgers and Hammerstein's Cinderella, with Houston in the title role. After four years of delay, the project was restarted. Now a mother, and feeling that she had aged out of the role, Houston offered it to her younger friend Brandy and took on the role of Fairy Godmother instead. Both Rodgers and Hammerstein had died by then; the remake was adapted by Robert L. Freedman and directed by Robert Iscove, with choreography by Rob Marshall. Produced by Houston and Debra Martin Chase for Walt Disney Television, it first aired on November 2, 1997. The racially diverse cast starred Brandy as Cinderella, Houston as the Fairy Godmother, Bernadette Peters as the Stepmother, and Paolo Montalban as the prince, with Whoopi Goldberg as the queen, Victor Garber as the king, Jason Alexander as Lionel, the herald. The stepsisters were Veanne Cox as Calliope and Natalie Desselle as Minerva. Sixty million viewers watched the broadcast, and Cinderella was again a popular and critical hit; the Disney Home Video version, also released that in 1997, became the best-selling video of a TV movie ever released.

Several songs were added, including "Falling in Love with Love" from the musical The Boys from Syracuse, sung by the Stepmother; "The Sweetest Sounds" from the musical No Strings, sung by Cinderella and the Prince; and "There's Music in You", written for the 1953 film Main Street to Broadway, sung as the finale by the Fairy Godmother. "The Prince Is Giving a Ball" was merged with parts of "Your Majesties" with additional lyrics by Fred Ebb. Music producers Chris Montan and Arif Mardin rearranged the orchestration to achieve a more contemporary sound. Several changes were also made to the Hammerstein plot: The Fairy Godmother begins the story, explaining that nothing is impossible, and the stepsisters' names are changed. Disguised as a peasant, the Prince (feeling isolated in the castle) wanders in the marketplace (worrying his herald, Lionel), meets Cinderella, and they find each other charming. As in 1965, the Fairy Godmother shows up to grant Cinderella's wishes without question. At the ball, embarrassed by questions about her family and background, Cinderella escapes to the garden in tears, where the Fairy Godmother appears for moral support. After her stepmother returns from the ball and is particularly cruel, Cinderella packs her belongings to run away from home. Her Fairy Godmother advises her to share her feelings with the Prince. After trying the slipper on all the other maidens, the Prince and Lionel overtake Cinderella on her journey to freedom. Meeting her gaze, the Prince recognizes her and places the slipper on her foot. At their wedding, the Fairy Godmother blesses the couple.

=== Planned godparents adaptation ===
A limited series based on the musical and told from the perspective of the fairy godparents, with Rachel Shukert serving as showrunner, is being developed by Jennifer Lopez's Nuyorican, Skydance Television and Concord Originals. Deadline Hollywood reported in July 2025 that it has information that the series is set to be shown on Disney+. A month later in August of that same year, Paramount Television Studios had absorbed Skydance Television's projects.

== Stage productions ==
=== 1958 to 2008 ===
The musical was first performed on stage at the London Coliseum in 1958 in a holiday pantomime adaptation produced by Harold Fielding. It opened on December 18, 1958, and played through the holiday season. Yana played Cinderella, with Tommy Steele as her best friend Buttons, Bruce Trent as the Prince, Jimmy Edwards as the King, Betty Marsden as the fairy godmother, Kenneth Williams and Ted Durante as the Ugly Sisters, and Godfrey James as Dandini. Songs from Me & Juliet and by Steele were added for Steele and Trent. Several new numbers were written for Steele and Trent. The production was played at the Hippodrome in Bristol the next season.

Stage versions began to appear in U.S. theaters by 1961, filling out the show's running time with other songs from the Rodgers catalogue. The Los Angeles Civic Light Opera produced the show in 1990 featuring Steve Allen, Jayne Meadows, and Rose-Marie. The Rodgers and Hammerstein Organization had a new stage version of the show prepared that stayed closer to the 1957 broadcast version; New York City Opera produced this version of the musical in 1993 and 1995 with Sally Ann Howes as The Fairy Godmother, Crista Moore as Cinderella, George Dvorsky as The Prince, Nancy Marchand (1993) and Jean Stapleton (1995) as The Stepmother, George S. Irving as The King and Jane Powell as The Queen. It revived the production in 2004 with Eartha Kitt as The Fairy Godmother, Sarah Uriarte Berry as Cinderella, Christopher Sieber as The Prince, John "Lypsinka" Epperson as The Stepmother, Dick Van Patten as The King, Renée Taylor as The Queen, Lea DeLaria as Joy and Ana Gasteyer as Portia. Another new version was prepared that was based on the 1997 Freedman teleplay. This was given a US tour from November 2000 through 2001 and starred Kitt as the Fairy Godmother, Deborah Gibson and later Jamie-Lynn Sigler and Jessica Rush as Cinderella, Paolo Montalban as the Prince, and a gender-bending Everett Quinton as the Stepmother, stopping at the Theater at Madison Square Garden in 2001, where Sigler played the title role.

A 30-week Asian tour of Cinderella starred Lea Salonga and Australian Peter Saide. The production was directed by Bobby Garcia, with choreography by Vince Pesce. Costume design was by Renato Balestra, with sets by David Gallo. The tour started in Manila, Philippines, on July 29, 2008. The show then went on to several cities in China, including Xian, Zhengzhou, Chongqing, Shenzhen, Gunagzhou, Shanghai, Beijing and Hong Kong and toured in Thailand, Singapore, Malaysia, Korea, and Japan, playing into mid-2009. A cast album was issued in 2008. An all-female production of the musical in Japan in 2008 featured J-Pop group Morning Musume and veteran members of the Takarazuka Revue. The production ran throughout August 2008 at Shinjuku Koma Theater in Tokyo. The lead roles of Cinderella and the Prince were performed by Morning Musume members Ai Takahashi and Risa Niigaki.

A production at the Paper Mill Playhouse from October to December 2005 was directed by Gabriel Barre and starred Paolo Montalban as the prince and Angela Gaylor in the title role, also featuring Suzzanne Douglas as the fairy godmother, Stanley Wayne Mathis as Lionel the steward, Joy Franz as the queen and Larry Keith as the king. The stage adaptation was by Tom Briggs, with orchestrations adapted from Bennett's originals by music director Tom Helm. Reviews were mixed. John Kenrick called it "second rate", criticizing the adaptation, direction, sets, costumes and most of the cast. His only praise was for Nora Mae Ling's stepmother, Franz, Keith, the puppeteers and Helm's conducting, though he disliked some of the tempi. Simon Saltzman of CurtainUp liked the production better, praising Barre, Mathis, the puppeteers/small part players, and much of the principal cast.

=== Broadway ===
Douglas Carter Beane wrote a new book for the musical's first Broadway production. In his plot, Cinderella opens Prince Topher's eyes to the injustice in the kingdom. The prince's parents have died, leaving the kingdom in the hands of a villainous regent who has been the prince's mentor and has duped his young charge into approving oppressive acts against the peasants. The rebel Jean-Michel, a new character, and stepsister Gabrielle are in love and demand reform. The score includes the familiar songs from the original version and several other songs from the Rodgers and Hammerstein catalogue.

The show, produced by Robyn Goodman, began previews on Broadway on January 25 and officially opened on March 3, 2013, at the Broadway Theatre. Mark Brokaw directed the production, with Josh Rhodes choreographing, and the cast included Laura Osnes in the title role, Santino Fontana as the Prince, Victoria Clark as crazy Marie/the Fairy Godmother, Harriet Harris as Ella's stepmother, Peter Bartlett as the Prime Minister, Ann Harada and Marla Mindelle as stepsisters Charlotte and Gabrielle, and Greg Hildreth as Jean-Michel. Designers included Anna Louizos (sets), William Ivey Long (costumes) and Kenneth Posner (lighting). The production was nominated for nine Tony Awards, winning one for Long's costume design. Reviews were mixed, with most critics praising Osnes's performance.

Keke Palmer was a replacement in the title role. A report in The Guardian commented that "casting an African American actor as such an iconic – and typically pale – character is emblematic of the progress Broadway is making, slowly and haltingly, in employing actors of color in a broader array of parts." The production closed on Broadway on January 3, 2015, after 41 previews and 770 regular performances. National tours and international productions have followed.

== Reception ==
The 1957 version of Cinderella was seen by the largest audience in history at the time of its premiere: 107,000,000 people in the US, fully 60% of the country's population at that time. Variety estimated that 24.2 million households were tuned into the show, with an average of 4.43 viewers each. Jon Cypher later remembered leaving the studio a few minutes after the broadcast had ended and finding the Manhattan streets deserted because so many had stayed in to watch the broadcast.

A review in The New York Times by Jack Gould characterized the musical as "a pleasant Cinderella that lacked the magic touch". He wrote that the broadcast received an "extraordinary range of reactions; it was either unreservedly enjoyed, rather angrily rejected or generally approved, subject to significant reservations". He praised Andrews as a "beguiling vision" in "lovely color video". But he complained about the book ("What possessed Mr. Hammerstein to turn the stepsisters into distasteful vaudeville clowns?"); about "errors" in "the most elementary kind of showmanship"; about costume ("couldn't Cinderella have been dressed in a dreamlike ball gown of fantasy rather than a chic, form-fitting number?"); and the staging ("cramped ... excellent depth, but limited width marred the ballroom scene"). He judged the songs "not top-drawer Rodgers and Hammerstein" and "reminiscent and derivative of some of their earlier successes" but praised four of them and said: "In television, where original music is virtually nonexistent, these add up to quite a treat ... some current [Broadway] musicals cannot boast as much melodically."

The 1965 version was broadcast repeatedly. The 1997 production was the number one show of the week, with over 60 million viewers. It became the highest-rated TV musical in a generation. Although it was a hit with audiences, it received mixed reviews. Theater historian John Kenrick called it a "clumsy remake" of the musical but commented that Bernadette Peters' "shtick trying on the glass slipper is hilarious". The New York Times praised the performers (Montalban has "an old-fashioned luxurious voice"; Jason Alexander "provides comic relief"; Goldberg "winningly blends royal dignity with motherly meddling"; Peters "brings vigor and sly comedy") but commented that the musical "was always a pumpkin that never turned into a glittering coach ... the songs are lesser Rodgers and Hammerstein ... it doesn't take that final leap into pure magic. Often charming and sometimes ordinary, this is a cobbled-together Cinderella for the moment, not the ages." Other critics, however, praised the presentation. One reviewer wrote: "Grade: A, a version both timely and timeless." Another agreed: "this version has much to recommend it." An encore broadcast on Valentine's Night 1998 drew another 15,000,000 viewers.

Reviews for the Broadway version were mixed. Ben Brantley of The New York Times called the 2013 Broadway production a "glittery patchwork of a show" that "wants to be reassuringly old-fashioned and refreshingly irreverent, sentimental and snarky, sincere and ironic, all at once." Brantley felt that the show "doesn't seem to know quite what" it wants to be. The Financial Times praised the cast, especially Osnes, the costumes and the choreography and opined that "the production is an absolute joy, marred only by occasional slowness of pace." Richard Zoglin, writing for Time magazine, noted that the new production is "brightly colored, high spirited and well sung", but compared it unfavorably with the "emotionally alive" 1957 broadcast. A reviewer from the Chicago Tribune wrote: "The fundamental problem with ... Beane's perplexing, wholly unromantic and mostly laugh-free new book ... is that it denies the audience the pleasure of instant reversals of fortune. ... This new version ends up collapsing the basic logic of the familiar story and tramples all over the musical soul of a score from another era". On the other hand, the reviewer from USA Today liked the production, commenting that "Osnes and a gifted supporting cast make this fairy tale very much their own – a scrumptious trifle that, for all its hokey moments, will charm theatergoers of all ages." An Associated Press review praised Beane's script and wrote that it "crackles with sweetness and freshness, combining a little "Monty Python's Spamalot" with some "Les Misérables". It also found the cast "first-rate" and the overall story "quirky, yet heart filled".

== Recordings ==
Columbia Records recorded the musical selections from the first telecast of Cinderella on March 18, 1957, nearly two weeks before the show aired, in monaural and stereophonic sound, releasing the mono version in 1957 and then the stereo version in 1958. The stereo version was later reissued on CD by Sony. The black-and-white kinescope recording made during the telecast was broadcast on PBS in December 2004 as part of its Great Performances series. It was later released on DVD with a documentary including most of its original players, as well as a kinescope of Rodgers and Hammerstein's appearance on The Ed Sullivan Show the preceding Sunday, featuring Hammerstein reciting one of the songs to orchestral accompaniment.

In 1959 RCA Victor released an abridged Cinderella with Mary Martin and The Little Orchestra Society, which was released on CD in 2010 (Sepia 1144). A cast LP album of the 1965 telecast was also issued by Columbia Masterworks Records and on a Sony Masterworks CD. All three of the telecast versions of Cinderella have been released on DVD. A cast recording of the 2013 Broadway production was issued by Ghostlight Records in 2013.

== Awards and nominations ==
=== 1957 TV special ===
| Year | Award ceremony | Category | Nominee | Result |
|---|---|---|---|---|
| 1958 | Primetime Emmy Award | Actress - Best Single Performance - Lead or Support | Julie Andrews | Nominated |
| 1958 | Primetime Emmy Award | Best Musical Contribution for Television | Richard Rodgers (music score) | Nominated |
| 1958 | Primetime Emmy Award | Best Live Camera Work | CBS | Nominated |

=== 1997 TV special ===
| Year | Award ceremony | Category | Nominee | Result |
|---|---|---|---|---|
| 1998 | Primetime Emmy Award | Outstanding Variety, Music, or Comedy Special | Whitney Houston, Debra Martin Chase, Craig Zadan, David R. Ginsburg, Neil Meron, Chris Montan, Mike Moder | Nominated |
| 1998 | Primetime Emmy Award | Outstanding Directing for a Variety or Music Program | Robert Iscove | Nominated |
| 1998 | Primetime Emmy Award | Outstanding Music Direction | Paul Bogaev | Nominated |
| 1998 | Primetime Emmy Award | Outstanding Art Direction for a Variety or Music Program | Randy Ser, Edward L. Rubin, Julie Kaye Fanton | Won |
| 1998 | Primetime Emmy Award | Outstanding Choreography | Rob Marshall | Nominated |
| 1998 | Primetime Emmy Award | Outstanding Costume Design for a Variety or Music Program | Ellen Mirojnick | Nominated |
| 1998 | Primetime Emmy Award | Outstanding Hairstyling for a Limited Series or Movie | Jennifer Guerrero-Mazursky, Ellin La Var, Carla Farmer, Julia L. Walker, Kimberly Kimble, Lucia Mace | Nominated |
| 1998 | Academy of Science Fiction, Fantasy and Horror Films | Best Single Genre Television Presentation | | Nominated |
| 1998 | American Cinema Editors | Best Edited Two-Hour Movie for Commercial Television | Casey O. Rohrs & Tanya M. Swerling | Nominated |
| 1998 | Excellence in Production Design Award | Variety or Awards Show, Music Special or Documentary | Randy Ser & Edward J. Rubin | Won |
| 1998 | Artios Award | Best Casting for TV Movie of the Week | Valorie Massalas, Stuart Howard, Amy Schecter | Nominated |
| 1998 | NAACP Image Award | Outstanding Television Movie, Mini-Series or Dramatic Special | | Nominated |
| 1998 | NAACP Image Award | Outstanding Actress in a Television Movie, Mini-Series or Dramatic Special | Brandy Norwood | Nominated |
| 1998 | NAACP Image Award | Outstanding Actress in a Television Movie, Mini-Series or Dramatic Special | Whoopi Goldberg | Nominated |
| 1998 | Golden Reel Award | Best Sound Editing - Television Movies of the Week - Music | Richard Ford | Nominated |
| 1998 | OFTA Television Award | Best Motion Picture Made for Television | | Nominated |
| 1998 | OFTA Television Award | Best Supporting Actress in a Motion Picture or Miniseries | Whoopi Goldberg | Nominated |
| 1998 | OFTA Television Award | Best Supporting Actress in a Motion Picture or Miniseries | Bernadette Peters | Nominated |
| 1998 | OFTA Television Award | Best Ensemble in a Motion Picture or Miniseries | | Nominated |
| 1998 | OFTA Television Award | Best Costume Design in a Motion Picture or Miniseries | | Nominated |
| 1998 | OFTA Television Award | Best Production Design in a Motion Picture or Miniseries | | Won |
| 1998 | OFTA Television Award | Best Sound in a Motion Picture or Miniseries | | Nominated |
| 1998 | Satellite Awards | Best Supporting Actor – Series, Miniseries or Television Film | Jason Alexander | Nominated |
| 1998 | Satellite Awards | Best Supporting Actress – Series, Miniseries or Television Film | Bernadette Peters | Nominated |
| 1999 | Writers Guild of America | Children's Script | | Nominated |
