= Asolo Repertory Theatre =

Theatre in Sarasota, Florida, United States

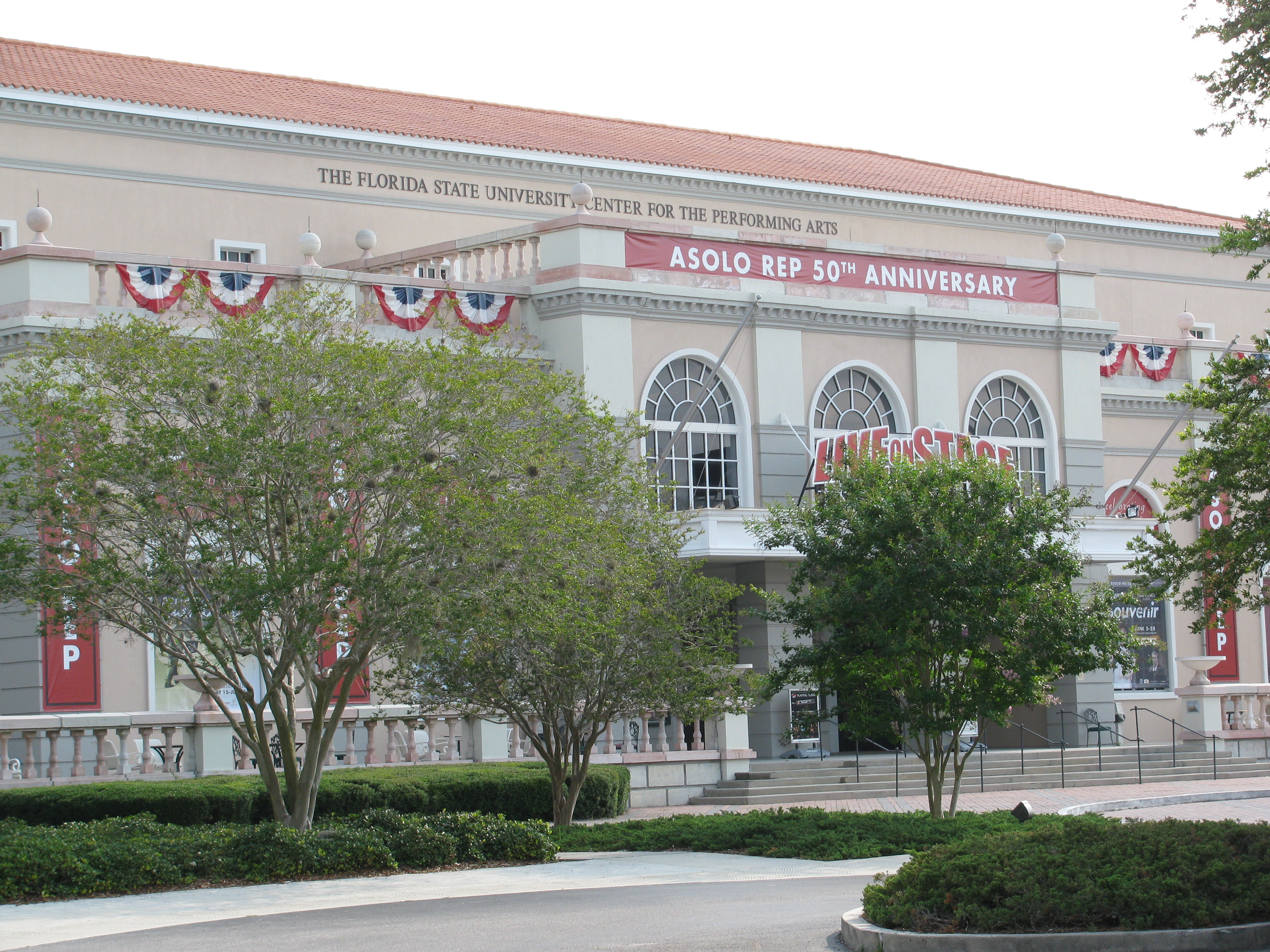
- FSU Center for the Performing Arts
- Interactive map of Asolo Repertory Theatre
- Address: 5555 N Tamiami Trail
- Location: Sarasota, Florida
- Coordinates: 27°23′0.3″N 82°33′30.5″W
- Type: Performing arts center, repertory theatre

Construction
- Opened: January 10, 1958

Website
- asolorep.org

The Asolo Repertory Theatre or Asolo Rep (AKA: Asolo Theatre Company, Inc.) is a professional theater in Sarasota, Florida. It is the largest Equity theatre in Florida, and the largest Repertory theatre in the Southeastern United States. Asolo Rep is a resident regional theatre company which also invites in guest artists. It works in conjunction with Florida State University's MFA Acting program, the FSU/Asolo Conservatory for Actor Training. It is currently housed in the Florida State University Center for the Performing Arts, a multi-theater complex, located on the John and Mable Ringling Museum of Art property. The 2008–2009 season marked Asolo Rep's 50th anniversary.

== History of the Historic Asolo Theatre ==
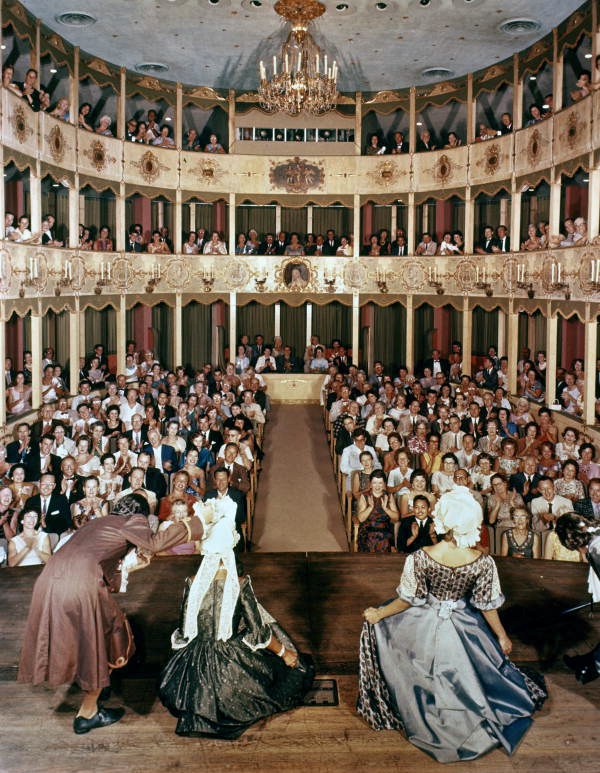
Interior view showing audience applauding for the Asolo Theater cast members on stage, 1961.

The original performance space for the Asolo Repertory Theatre was housed in a historic theatre that was initially located in Asolo, Italy in province of Treviso, fifty kilometers North West of Venice. Commissioned in 1798 by Italian impresario Antonio Locatelli, the theatre stood in the former audience hall of the castle of Caterina Cornaro, the former Queen of Cyprus. The horse-shoe shaped theatre contains four tiers of boxes and was modeled after La Fenice. In the late 19th and early 20th centuries the building was the home theatre of the great Italian actress Eleonora Duse.

In 1930, the Asolo Theatre was dismantled and put into storage. In 1949 the museum director of the John and Mable Ringling Museum of Art learned of the theatre's existence and saw the theatre as an ideal acquisition for the museum. The State of Florida agreed and purchased the theatre which was crated and shipped to Sarasota, Florida. In 1952 the theatre was set up in a gallery in the Ringling museum. In the late 1950s it was decided that the theatre should be reconstructed so that modern theatre performances could be staged. The reconstructed theatre therefore incorporates the historic architecture into a building that is modern in design.

The Asolo Theatre opened its doors on January 10, 1958, with a production of Wolfgang Amadeus Mozart's Die Entführung aus dem Serail. Presented by the New York City Opera, the production was directed and conducted by Julius Rudel. The opera starred Robert Rounseville as Belmonte, Beverly Bower as Konstanze, Herbert Beattle as Osmin, and Jacquelynne Moody as Blonde.

The theatre has since been moved to another location on the Ringling grounds and is now known as The Historic Asolo Theatre. The Asolo Repertory Company still puts on a few productions there each year, but it is no longer its primary location. Most shows for the Rep Company are performed at the Mertz Theatre, which is housed in the Florida State University Center for the Performing Arts, which is across the street. In addition, the Rep Company collaborates with other theater companies in the South, such as Miami New Drama at the Colony Theatre.

== History of the Mertz Theatre ==
The Harold E. and Esther M. Mertz Theatre was brought to America from Scotland, where it had existed as the Dunfermline Opera House, Scotland. Built in 1921 by architects Swanston and Davison, it had been dismantled in the 1980s to make way for a shopping mall and after more than a decade in storage was taken to Florida to be meticulously re-assembled as a working professional playhouse with the help of the Scottish architect who had saved the interior of the building years before, James Dunbar Nasmith. The Mertz Theatre was dedicated on January 27, 1990 by the then Provost of Dunfermline and Elizabeth Mertz. The 2009–2010 season marked its twentieth anniversary, which was to be celebrated with a Scottish-themed event in January.

== Artists ==
The Asolo has engaged a collection of talented artists throughout the years, including all those listed below.

=== Actors ===
- James Stacy Barbour
- Wendy Barrie-Wilson
- Mimi Bessette
- Deanna Dunagan
- Wayne Duvall
- Linda Eder
- Rob Evan
- Richard Falklen
- Hershey Felder
- Kelsey Fowler
- Anthony Heald
- Donald C. Hepner
- Polly Holliday
- Jayne Houdyshell
- Tom Hulce
- Jeremy Jordan
- Ann Morrison
- Brad Oscar
- Laura Osnes
- John G. Preston
- Paul Reubens
- Jessica Rush
- Daniel Patrick Russell
- Natalie Toro
- Melissa van der Schyff
- Granville Van Dusen
- Chuck Wagner
- Elizabeth Ward

=== Directors ===
- Jeff Calhoun
- Warren Carlyle
- Brad Dalton
- Keith Fowler
- Frank Galati
- Lillian Garrett-Groag
- Gordon Greenberg
- Tony Walton

=== Designers ===
- Howell Binkley
- Matthew Parker
- Richard Pilbrow
- Eduardo Sicangco
- Tony Walton
- Robert Wierzel

=== Other artists ===
- Nilo Cruz
- Steven Drukman
- John McDaniel
- Lynn Nottage
- Frank Wildhorn

== See also ==
- Florida State University/Asolo Conservatory for Actor Training
