= Wendy Barrie-Wilson =

American actress (born 1954)

- Born: June 9, 1954 (age 72)
- Education: BFA in Theatre/Film, Denison University; MFA in Acting, University of North Carolina at Chapel Hill
- Occupation: Actress

Wendy Barrie-Wilson (born June 9, 1954) is an American stage actress who has performed in more than 100 plays on Broadway and around the world.

== Early life and education ==
Barrie-Wilson was born in Loveland, Ohio. She is from a well-known American acting family; her great-aunt and great-uncle, Elizabeth Risdon and Brandon Evans, were members of the Theatre Guild. Her first play was at the age of seven, when she played Sleeping Beauty, performed in French.

She received her BFA in Theatre/Film at Denison University and her MFA in acting at the University of North Carolina at Chapel Hill, and has taught acting-related classes at Denison University, UNC-Chapel Hill, The ArtSchool (in North Carolina), and the Denver Center Conservatory. She has also led seminars on playing Shakespeare at Northeastern University in Boston, and at Baltimore's School for the Performing Arts.

== Stage career ==
During Barrie-Wilson's first year in New York, she performed on Broadway in Arthur Miller's All My Sons starring Richard Kiley. Wilson has since performed in several other stagings of All My Sons, and has played every female role. Shortly later, she stood in for an ill Sigourney Weaver as Stella in A Streetcar Named Desire, opposite Christopher Walken and Blythe Danner at Williamstown Theatre Festival, with only one day's notice of opening night. She retained this role until Weaver recovered from her illness.

Reviewing Barrie-Wilson's leading performance as Amanda Wingfield in The Glass Menagerie at the Shakespeare Theatre of New Jersey, Variety critic Robert Daniels said that: "[s]he is one of the finest Amanda Wingfields in memory and can proudly take her place alongside the memorable Amandas in this critic's experience: Helen Hayes, Jessica Tandy, Julie Harris, and Maureen Stapleton."

In addition to her role as Amanda Wingfield, Barrie-Wilson has performed as Yelena (opposite Hal Holbrook and Robert Foxworth) in Uncle Vanya, Lady Croom in Arcadia, May in Fool for Love, Masha in Three Sisters, Andromache in The Greeks, Tourvel in Les Liaisons Dangereuses, and Mrs. Gibbs in Our Town. She has also performed several times in her two favorite plays: as Roxane in Rostand's Cyrano de Bergerac, and Stella in Tennessee Williams' A Streetcar Named Desire.

== Tours ==
Barrie-Wilson has performed around the United States, including the Actor's Theatre of Louisville, Great Lakes Theater Festival, Asolo Repertory Theatre, New Jersey Shakespeare Festival, River Arts Repertory, and the Denver Center Theatre Company. She has worked with such writers as J.P. Donleavy, Derek Walcott, the Red Clay Ramblers, and Arthur Miller, as well as many new writers.

== Television appearances ==
Barrie-Wilson's work on network television includes minor roles on Law & Order and its spinoffs, The Days and Nights of Molly Dodd, Another World, One Life to Live, All My Children, and Prince Street. She has also had roles on cable television, including on PBS and Showtime in the film version of Our Town. Her television career also includes numerous commercials and voice-over work, including several years on Japanese television as a mom for General Foods' Blendy Coffee. She also won an Addy Award for Z94's "Morning Zoo".
