= Andrew Alexander (actor) =

English actor and singer

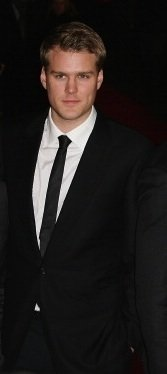
- Born: Andrew James Joseph Alexander de Perlaky
- Occupation: Actor
- Years active: 2007–present
- Spouse: Araxie Kutchukian

Andrew Alexander is an English actor and singer, who is best known for his role as Sir John Bullock in Downton Abbey.

In 2018, he was made an Associate of the Royal Academy of Music for his significant contribution to the creative industries.

He is currently training to be an entertainment lawyer at the entertainment law firm Clintons.

== Early life ==
Alexander attended Bradfield College, receiving academic and music scholarships. He went on to read history at King's College London before training in Musical Theatre at the Royal Academy of Music.

== Career ==
=== Theatre ===
At 29 he played the lead role, Richard Hannay, in The 39 Steps in London's West End, having understudied the role previously. He was the first understudy to be promoted in the production due to favourable reviews and notices, including from Stephen Fry on Twitter. Other credits include The Hot Mikado at The Watermill (nominated for a TMA award) and Trouble in Mind at The Print Room (nominated for Offie and UK Theatre Awards).

=== Film and TV ===
Year	Title	Role
2013	Downton Abbey	Sir John Bullock
2014	The Monuments Men	Major Piper
2014	A Hundred Streets	Mikey
2015	The Hippopotamus	Matthew Lake
2015	Midsomer Murders	Harry Whyam
2017	McMafia	Milo
2018	EastEnders	Henry
2019	Ladhood	Tom

=== Singing and music ===
He was an original member of the Sony BMG group Teatro. Teatro's first album was certified Gold in the UK. Performances included headlining at the Royal Variety Performance, meeting the Queen, and supporting José Carreras at the BBC Proms in the Park in Hyde Park.

== Discography ==
=== Studio albums ===
Title	Details	Certifications	
Title	Details	Certifications	UK
Teatro	Released: 26 November 2007; Label: Sony BMG; Format: CD	BPI: Gold	

== Personal life ==
Alexander currently lives in West London with his wife, artist Araxie Kutchukian.
