= Katherine McGrath =

American singer (1944 - 2018)

- Born: December 11, 1944; Winchester, Massachusetts, U.S.
- Died: March 17, 2018 (aged 73)
- Occupations: Actress, Singer
- Years active: 1977–2018

Katherine McGrath was an American singer and stage and television actress, who appeared in several Broadway plays.

== Career ==
Katherine McGrath studied acting at The Boston Conservatory and later at the Royal Academy of London. McGrath acted almost exclusively in regional theatre during the 1970s and 1980s, receiving some press attention by 1977. She performed in Lake Charles, Louisiana at the Little Theater in a 1977 production called Katherine McGrath with a little help from her friends. McGrath performed at many of the great theaters in the United States: The Old Globe in San Diego, The Guthrie in Minneapolis, The Kennedy Center in Washington DC, The Mark Taper Forum and The Ahmanson Theater in Los Angeles, The Berkeley Repertory Theatre, The Hartford Stage Company, and as a member of The National Repertory Theatre, she performed at the historic re-opening of Ford's Theatre in Washington, D.C. She focused on work in regional theatres around the country instead of New York, telling The New York Times "It would be nice to work at home... but it seems to me that the classical plays I want to do are in the regional theaters - and you are offered the opportunity to do two or three plays at once, in repertory. It alleviates the boredom of doing the same role night after night. The only place you can find that is in the regions."

From 1988 to 1994, McGrath appeared as a guest in several television shows. She appeared at the Old Globe Theatre in San Diego in numerous productions from 1982 to 2001. Roles included Titania in A Midsummer Night's Dream, Goneril in King Lear, the title role in the one-woman show Shirley Valentine, and Emelia in Othello. McGrath was named an Associate Artist of The Old Globe, a designation reserved for artists who have had an extraordinary impact on The Old Globe through their work. During her run in The Music Man on Broadway, McGrath said "I did what I wanted all my life, working at the Globe. You don't make a lot of money, but your soul gets fed. The work is soul food.”

== Broadway ==
McGrath appeared in A Man of No Importance at the Lincoln Center Theater from September 12 to December 29, 2002 in the dual role of Mrs. Grace and Kitty Farrelly.

McGrath was cast as Miss Pross in the Broadway musical of A Tale of Two Cities, which opened for previews on August 19, 2008 at the Al Hirschfeld Theatre in New York. The Broadway show closed on November 8, 2008.

She played Grandma in Billy Elliott at the Imperial Theatre from September 26, 2011 to January 8, 2012. McGrath played Mrs. Paroo in The Music Man from Apr 27, 2000 - Dec 30, 2001 in which Variety called her "a wonderful actress often seen at San Diego’s Old Globe Theater."

== Broadway credits ==
- Billy Elliott, Grandma
- A Tale of Two Cities (2008), Miss Pross
- The Music Man, Widow Paroo
- Night of the Tribades

== Television ==
- Frasier
- Cheers - Katherine played the part of Desiree Harrison (Sam's cleaning lady) in the episode titled 'The Book of Samuel'.
- Hill Street Blues
- General Hospital
- Trying Times
- Wonder Works
- Scandal in a Small Town
