= Teatro (band) =

Vocal group

- Origin: United Kingdom & United States
- Genres: Musical theatre
- Years active: 2007 – present
- Label: Sony BMG
- Members: Jeremiah James; Andrew Alexander; Simon Bailey; Stephen Rahman-Hughes
- Website: teatromusic.com

Teatro, Italian for "theatre", is a vocal group signed to the Sony BMG music label. The members of Teatro are Jeremiah James, Andrew Alexander, Simon Bailey and Stephen Rahman-Hughes.

== Band members ==
=== Jeremiah James ===
Jeremiah James was born in upstate New York and raised in Los Angeles. He was one of the youngest performers ever to be nominated for a Los Angeles Theater Ovation Award for Best Lead Actor in a Musical for his role in Crazy For You. He appeared in Sir Cameron Mackintosh revival of Oklahoma! as Curly. He appeared in the pre-West End tour of Rodgers and Hammerstein's Carousel as Billy Bigelow, and he is currently performing the same role at the Savoy Theatre in London's West End.

=== Andrew Alexander ===
Andrew Alexander is a graduate of the Royal Academy of Music. He played Nanki-Poo opposite Nicola Hughes in a new production of The Hot Mikado (which was nominated for a TMA Award), and alongside Marti Webb and Wayne Sleep in Beauty and the Beast.

He played Prince Charming in the 2009 production of Snow White at the Lyceum Theatre in Sheffield.

He is currently performing as Richard Hannay in the Olivier award-winning comedic play The 39 Steps in London's West End at the Criterion Theatre, Piccadilly.

=== Simon Bailey ===
Simon Bailey is a graduate of the National Youth Theatre. He has appeared in Les Misérables and Romeo and Juliet at London's Piccadilly Theatre, and at a Rock Legends tribute show in South Africa where he performed as Freddie Mercury and Ringo Starr.

His mid Capital of Culture year appearance as male lead, across from Julie Atherton in Phil Willmott and Elliot Davis's specially commissioned musical creation of Once Upon a Time at the Adelphi, played to full houses and standing ovations, during an extended run at The Liverpool Playhouse Theatre

His latest role of 'Raoul' in the smash hit Andrew Lloyd Webber musical The Phantom of the Opera at Her Majesty's Theatre in London, which recently played its 9000th performance and which will celebrate its 22nd birthday on Thursday 9 October, runs from Monday 8 September.

=== Stephen Rahman-Hughes ===
Stephen Rahman-Hughes is half-British, half-Malaysian. He attended the Rambert Dance School from the ages of 18–22 and formed an award-winning choreography company before turning to acting. He has appeared in West Side Story and Bombay Dreams on the West End stage, as well as dramas including Bad Girls, Dream Team and Doctors. In Malaysia he is known for playing the lead role of Hang Tuah in Malaysia's outstandingly successful musical, Puteri Gunung Ledang. He plays Detective Chief Inspector Dasari in ITV's Emmerdale.

== Discography ==
Teatro, the eponymous debut album, was released 26 November 2007. It features songs from musical theatre including "The Music of the Night" (The Phantom of the Opera), "Maria" (West Side Story), "Don't Cry for Me, Argentina" (Evita), "Over the Rainbow" (The Wizard of Oz) and "Love Changes Everything" (Aspects of Love). Among them, the songs have won 23 Oscars, 11 Golden Globes, 39 Tony Awards and 3 Grammys.

The album features the Royal Philharmonic Orchestra and was produced by Nick Patrick, who has produced hits for Tina Turner, Marvin Gaye, Russell Watson, Tony Bennett and Katherine Jenkins. Noted arranger Jorge Calandrelli also worked on the album.

=== Track listing ===
1. "The Music of the Night" (The Phantom of the Opera)
2. "Love Changes Everything" (Aspects of Love)
3. "Over the Rainbow" (The Wizard of Oz)
4. "Can You Feel the Love Tonight" (The Lion King)
5. "Luck Be a Lady" (Guys and Dolls)
6. "Maria" (West Side Story)
7. "The Impossible Dream" (Man of La Mancha)
8. "Edelweiss" (The Sound of Music)
9. "I Am What I Am" (La Cage Aux Folles)
10. "I Dreamed a Dream" (Les Misérables)
11. "Don't Cry for Me, Argentina" (Evita)
12. "Memory" (Cats)
