= Jeremiah James =

American actor

Jeremiah James is an American producer, singer, and stage actor who is best known for producing the musicals The Last Match and It Happened in Key West, as well as for his membership in the music group Teatro.

== Early life ==
James was born in Rochester, New York on April 1, 1980. He grew up in Los Angeles where he attended the Academy of Performing Arts at Alexander Hamilton High School. He is currently based out of New York.

== Career ==
One of the youngest performers ever nominated for the Los Angeles Theater Ovation Awards for Best Lead Actor in a Musical, James was nominated for his leading role in Crazy For You. Later he appeared in the Sir Cameron Mackintosh revival of Oklahoma! as Curly. Following his participation in the musical group Teatro, James appeared West End revival of Rodgers and Hammerstein's Carousel as Billy Bigelow. He went on to star as El Gallo in the long running off-Broadway musical the Fantasticks and later in the off-Broadway musical Sweetee. He continues to perform in regional theatre productions around the United States.

James was an original member of the Sony BMG group Teatro. Teatro's first album, titled "Teatro", was certified Gold in the UK. The group headlined at The 2007 Royal Variety Performance, performing for and meeting Her Majesty Queen Elizabeth II.

In 2010, James released his debut solo album titled Tupelo, named for the birthplace of Elvis Presley and consisting of covers of Presley's songs.

James conceived, produced, and wrote the book for the 2018 original West End musical It Happened in Key West, based on the true story of eccentric recluse Carl Tanzler. Jill Santoriello wrote the music and lyrics and co-wrote the book for the musical, with Jason Huza co-writing book and contributing additional lyrics.

Additionally, James has produced numerous theatrical productions and audiobooks.

He began hosting the podcast the University of Pleasure with sex therapist Tera Jansen on February 14, 2020. In June of 2020, Jeremiah James published his first novel, an empowerment erotica book titled Amy: Book One, and written in conjunction with co-author Autumn Karen.

In 2022, he became the standby for the roles of Nick Arnstein, Florenz Ziegfeld Jr., and Tom Keeney in the 2022 Broadway revival of Funny Girl.
