= Asolo Conservatory for Actor Training =

Florida State University/Asolo Conservatory for Actor Training
- Type: Public university
- Established: 1968
- Dean: Dr. James Frazier
- Location: Sarasota, Florida, United States
- Website: Official website

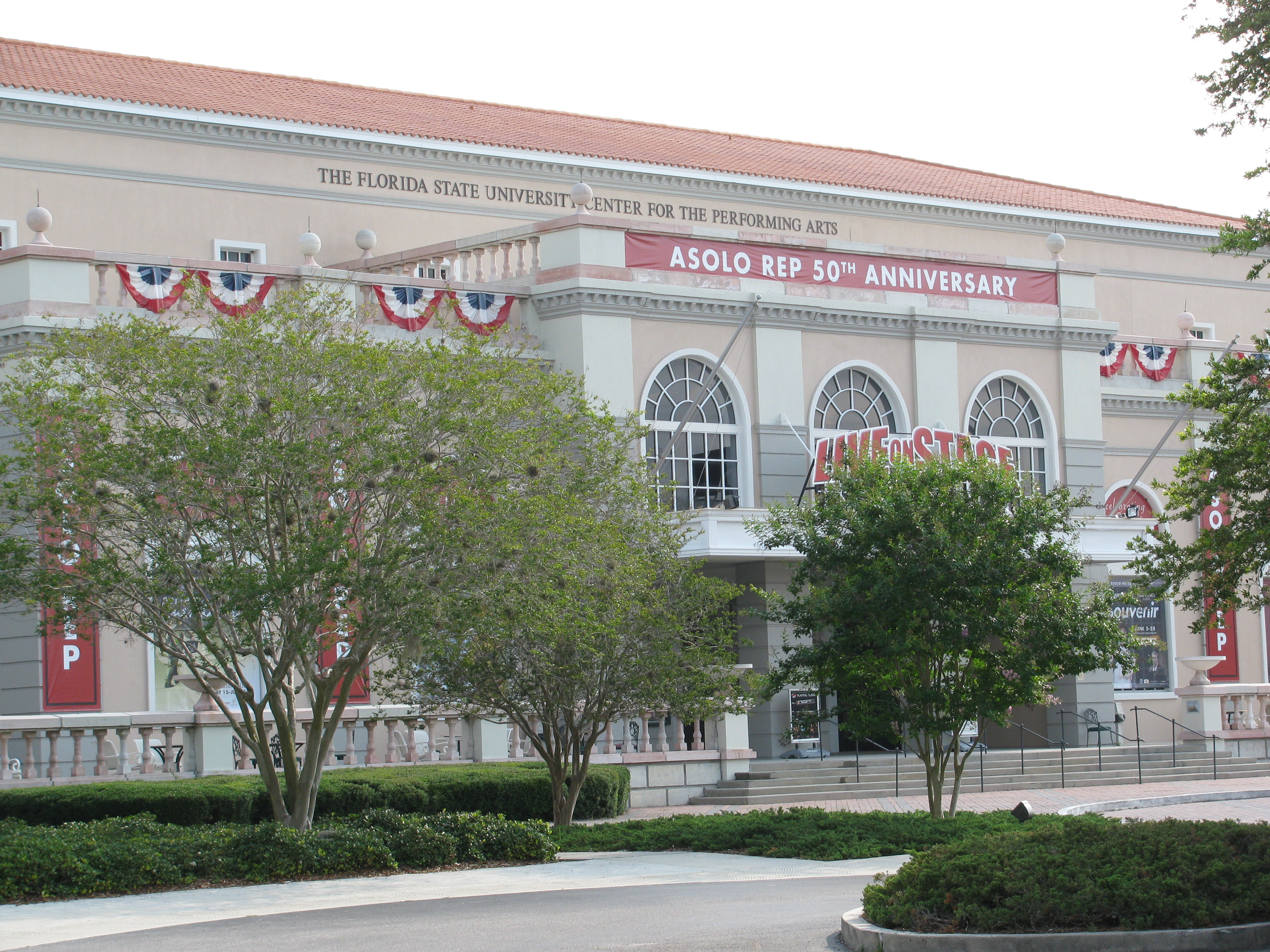
FSU Center for the Performing Arts, Sarasota, Florida

The Florida State University/Asolo Conservatory for Actor Training or FSU/Asolo Conservatory for Actor Training is a three-year graduate program culminating in a Master of Fine Arts degree in Acting. The program is operated by Florida State University in conjunction with the Asolo Repertory Theatre.

== FSU/Asolo Conservatory ==
It is currently housed in the Florida State University Center for the Performing Arts, which is a multi-theater complex, located on The Ringling property which is managed by Florida State University.

First year students perform understudy roles with the Asolo Repertory Theatre during their first year, perform onstage for the conservatory season in the Cook Theatre during their second year, and are treated as company members of the Asolo Rep in their 3rd year. Upon graduation from the program, students are eligible to join the Actors' Equity Association.

In 2019, the program was named one of the top 25 drama schools in the world by The Hollywood Reporter. The program auditions 1200-1500 students annually in four locations. It accepts a maximum of 12 students per school year.

== 2022-2023 season ==
This was the first season presented by Andrei Malaev-Babel, Director and Head of Acting for the conservatory.

- Sense and Sensibility written by Kate Hamill, based on the novel by Jane Austen
- Stick Fly by Lydia Diamond
- An Inspector Calls by J.B. Priestly
- Love's Labours Lost by William Shakespeare

== 2021-2022 season ==
This was the last season Greg Leaming served as the director of FSU's Conservatory for Acting Training, he retired after 17 years in this position.

- Everybody by Branden Jacobs-Jenkins
- Belleville by Amy Herzog
- The Learned Ladies by Molière, translated by Richard Wilbur
- Twelfth Night by William Shakespeare

== 2020-2021 season ==
This season was initially announced with the usual 4 shows, however, due to the COVID-19 pandemic this season instead consisted of 2 recorded plays.

Initial announcement:

- Sister Carrie based on the novel by Theodore Dreiser, adapted by Greg Leaming
- Exit, Pursued by a Bear by Lauren Gunderson
- Baby with the Bathwater by Christopher Durang
- Julius Caesar by William Shakespeare

Actual season:

- Twilight, Los Angeles by Anna Deavere Smith
- Julius Caesar by William Shakespeare

== 2015–2016 season ==
The season was presented under the helm of Greg Leaming, who has served as the Associate Artistic Director for Asolo Repertory Theatre and Director of the Conservatory for the past eleven years.

- The Real Inspector Hound by Tom Stoppard
- The Liar by David Ives, adapted from the comedy by Pierre Corneille
- Macbeth by William Shakespeare
- Nora by Ingmar Bergman, adapted from Henrik Ibsen's A Doll's House

== 2014–2015 season ==
The season was presented under the helm of Greg Leaming, who has served as the Associate Artistic Director for Asolo Repertory Theatre and Director of the Conservatory for the past ten years.

- The Water Engine by David Mamet
- As You Like It by William Shakespeare
- title of show by Jeff Bowen and Hunter Bell
- The Cherry Orchard by Anton Chekhov

== 2013–2014 season ==
The season was presented under the helm of Greg Leaming, who has served as the Associate Artistic Director for Asolo Repertory Theatre and Director of the Conservatory for the past nine years.

- The School for Lies by David Ives, adapted from Moliere's Misanthrope
- Loot by Joe Orton
- How I Learned to Drive by Paula Vogel
- Antigone by Jean Anouilh

== 2012–2013 season ==
The season was presented under the helm of Greg Leaming, who has served as the Associate Artistic Director for Asolo Repertory Theatre and Director of the Conservatory for the past eight years.

- Twelfth Night by William Shakespeare
- The Aliens by Annie Baker
- Stop Kiss by Diana Son
- Candida by George Bernard Shaw

== 2011–2012 season ==
The season will be presented under the helm of Greg Leaming, who has been serving as the Associate Artistic Director for Asolo Repertory Theatre and Director of the Conservatory for the past seven years.

- The Brothers Karamazov by Fyodor Dostoyevsky, adapted by Anthony Clarvoe; November 1–20, 2011
- Lobby Hero by Kenneth Lonergan; January 3–22, 2012
- The Robbers by Friedrich Schiller; February 21-March 11, 2012
- Cloud Nine by Caryl Churchill; April 3–22, 2012

== 2010–2011 season ==
The season will be presented under the helm of Greg Leaming, who has been serving as the Associate Artistic Director for Asolo Repertory Theatre and Director of the Conservatory for the past six years.

- The Two Gentlemen of Verona by William Shakespeare, directed by Greg Leaming; October 26, 2010 - November 14, 2010
- Reasons to Be Pretty by Neil LaBute, directed by Barbara Redmond; January 4, 2011 - January 23, 2011
- The Lady from the Sea by Henrik Ibsen, directed by Andrei Malaev-Babel; February 22, 2011 - March 13, 2011
- Tartuffe by Molière, directed by Wes Granthom; April 12, 2011 - May 1, 2011

== 2009–2010 season ==
- The Mystery Play by Roberto Aguirre-Sacasa; October 27, 2009 - November 15, 2009
- Blue/Orange by Joe Penhall; January 5, 2010 - January 24, 2010
- Machinal by Sophie Treadwell; March 2, 2010 - March 21, 2010
- The Game of Love and Chance by Pierre Marivaux; April 14, 2010 - May 3, 2010

== Notable alumni ==
- Karl Backus
- Richard Falklen
- Lesley Fera
