= Natalie Toro (actress) =

American theater actress and singer

- Born: Bronx, New York, U.S.
- Education: Boston Conservatory (BFA)
- Occupations: Actress, singer

Natalie Toro is an American singer and actress for theatre, television, and film.

== Early life and education ==
Toro was born in the Bronx, New York, where her parents both immigrated to from Puerto Rico. She debuted at the Apollo Theater at the age of five. Later on, she studied piano and voice at the pre-college division of Manhattan School of Music and the High School of Music and Art until the age of 18. She attended the Boston Conservatory of Music earning a BFA in Musical Theater.

== Career ==
In 1999, Toro began a long journey with A Tale of Two Cities, a musical by Jill Santoriello. In 2002, she performed the role of Madame Defarge for the concept recording of the musical. In 2010, she reunited with many members of the Broadway Cast to record the “International Studio Cast Recording”, as well as a DVD of a semi-staged highlights concert of the musical.

In 2004, she began to tour with Jesus Christ Superstar, both while Sebastian Bach was on the tour and after he left. In 2007, she was cast in the Broadway musical adaptation of A Tale of Two Cities in Sarasota, Florida at the Asolo Repertory Theatre. She received a 2007 Sarasota Magazine Award for Best Supporting Theatre Actress. Broadway previews in New York began on August 19, 2008, at the Al Hirschfeld Theatre, with an official opening of September 18. She remained in the show until it closed on November 16, 2008.

On November 23, 2008, Toro released her second solo-CD, which was self-titled "Natalie Toro".

== Theatrical Credits ==
=== Broadway ===
- A Tale of Two Cities, Madame Defarge
- Les Misérables, Eponine
- A Christmas Carol (Madison Square Garden Productions)

=== Off-Broadway ===
- Zombie Prom (off-Broadway)

=== National Tour ===
- Cats, Grizabella
- Evita, Evita Peron
- Jesus Christ Superstar, Mary Magdalene
- In the Heights, Camila Rosario

== Theatre Awards ==
- 2009: 2008-09 BroadwayWorld Fan Theatre Awards for Best Featured Actress (Finalist/Nominated) - Madame DeFarge, A Tale of Two Cities
- 2008: Sarasota Magazine Theatre Award for Best Featured Actress (WIN) - Madame DeFarge, A Tale of Two Cities
- 1999: J. Jefferson Theatre Award (Chicago) for Best Actress (Nominated) - Evita in Evita
