= Jessica Rush =

American actress and singer (born 1980)

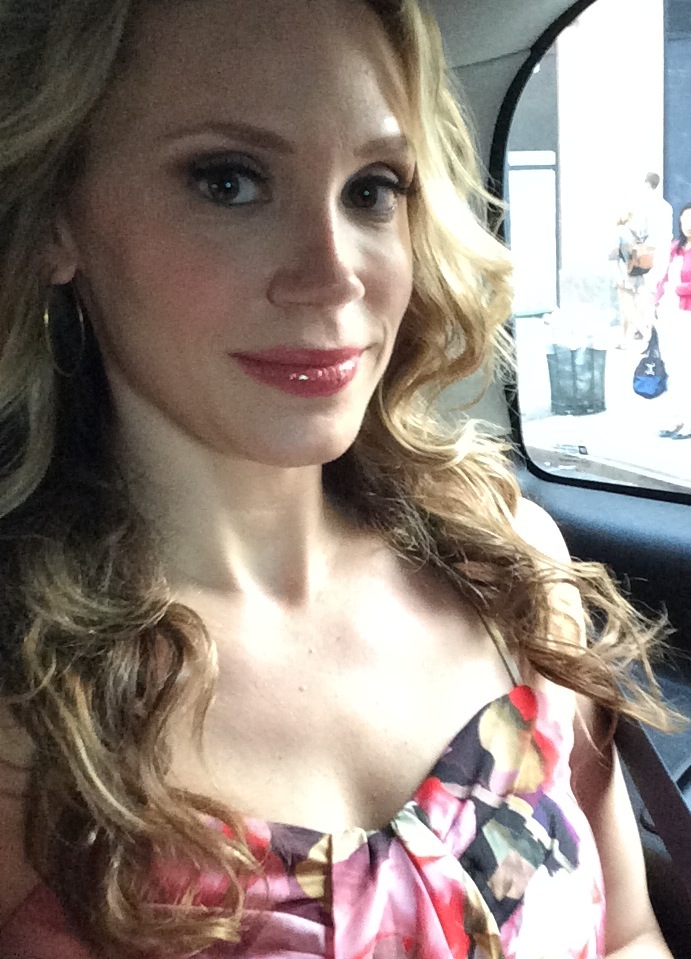
- Born: December 23, 1980 (age 44); Beaumont, Texas
- Occupation(s): Actress, singer
- Spouse: Eric Anderson (m. 2011)
- Children: 1

Jessica Rush (born December 23, 1980) is an American actress and singer. She won the Joseph Jefferson Award in 2014 for her performance in Gypsy at the Chicago Shakespeare Theater.

== Early life ==
Born in Beaumont, Texas, the daughter of performers Ken and Sara Rush, Jessica made her stage debut at the age of ten weeks opposite her father as Motel and Tzeitel's child in Fiddler on the Roof. Her childhood was spent sharing the boards with her parents all across SE Texas. When she was a teenager, the Rush family moved to Orlando, Florida, where she soon went to work for Disney and Nickelodeon on camera, in the parks; where she portrayed Belle in Disney World's production of Beauty and the Beast, and with Disney Cruise Lines.

== National/regional tours ==
Rush played Sophie in the first U.S. national tour of Mamma Mia!, Martha Cratchit in the national tour of A Christmas Carol, and the title role in Cinderella opposite Eartha Kitt. She lived in Los Angeles for a stint, where she originated the role of Anna in the world premiere of Pilgrim. She also created the role of Lucie Manette in the 2007 world premiere of A Tale of Two Cities, by Jill Santoriello in Sarasota, Florida. She did not join the Broadway cast for Tale's short run on Broadway. Rush played Louise in Gypsy at the Chicago Shakespeare Theater, and won the Joseph Jefferson Award in 2014 for her performance.

== Broadway and off-Broadway ==
Rush was seen Off-Broadway at the City Center's Encores! as Renee in the pre-Broadway production of Gypsy opposite Patti LuPone, Boyd Gaines, Laura Benanti and Leigh Ann Larkin. In March 2008, she joined the original Broadway revival cast of that company and was the standby for "Louise" under Benanti, a role which she performed several times. Also on Broadway, Rush appeared in the 2009 revival of Guys and Dolls. Rush portrayed Lorraine in Jersey Boys at the August Wilson Theatre, and was in the final cast when it closed its eleven-year run on Broadway. From 2019 to 2022, Rush starred as Rhonda in the Broadway production of Tina: The Musical.

== Television ==
Rush appeared on White Collar. She was featured on the Showtime series Billions.

== Personal life ==
Jessica Rush is married to Broadway actor Eric Anderson, and has a daughter named Elliot.
