= Les Minski =

American singer and stage actor

Les Minski is an American singer and stage actor.

Minski has been cast as the Marquis St. Evremonde in the Broadway musical adaptation of 'A Tale of Two Cities' opening for preview on August 19, 2008, at the Al Hirschfeld Theatre in New York.

== Theatre Credits ==
- A Tale of Two Cities (2008), Marquis St. Evremonde
- Carousel, Billy
- Annie, Daddy Warbucks
- Find Your Way Home, Alan
- Guys and Dolls, Sky
