= Jill Santoriello =

Jill Santoriello is an American musician, composer, lyricist, and author. She is a self-taught musician whose award-winning first musical A Tale of Two Cities was an Outer Critics Circle Award nominee for Outstanding New Musical in 2009. Her newest musical "It Happened In Key West", co-written with Jason Huza and Jeremiah James, released its Live London Cast Recording on June 17, 2022 following its world premiere at London's Charing Cross Theatre starring Wade McCollum beginning July 4, 2018. The recording is available on all digital platforms including Apple Music, Amazon, and Spotify. Santoriello wrote the book, music and lyrics for "Key West" with Jason Huza co-writing the book and contributing additional lyrics, and Jeremiah James conceiving and co-writing the book. Also in 2022, nine songs from "It Happened in Key West" were featured at Broadway on the Bowery at Duane Park on March 7, 2022. Previously several songs were premiered at the Good To Go Festival and at Broadway Au Carre in Paris.

Santoriello was born in Summit, New Jersey and grew up in Berkeley Heights, New Jersey, and graduated from Governor Livingston High School in 1983.

On September 18, 2008, Santoriello's Broadway musical adaptation of A Tale of Two Cities officially opened at the Al Hirschfeld Theatre in New York, from previews on August 19. The musical's producers announced on November 4 that the show would be closing on November 16, but closed earlier than expected on November 9.

In addition to the 2009 Outer Critics Circle Award nomination for Outstanding New Musical, "Tale" also received an additional Outer Critics Circle nomination for Best Actor and 3 Drama Desk Award nominations. The world premiere production at the Asolo Theatre was nominated for 12 Sarasota Theater Awards and won 10, including "Best Musical".

In 2009, Santoriello adapted the musical for the concert stage and co-produced a television filming of the concert at the Theatre Royal in Brighton, England. This television program was broadcast on public television, WGBH-Boston in December 2009 and a DVD of the show is available on Amazon. Santoriello also co-produced an accompanying studio recording of the score for simultaneous release with the television show.

She also contributed to the music and lyrics to the musical version of Diana Gabaldon's Outlander. Music by Kevin Walsh and lyrics by Mike Gibb.

Among her new projects are a musical version of the 1913 Eleanor H. Porter novel Pollyanna.

== Education ==
Santoriello is a Carr Van Anda honors graduate of the Ohio University School of Journalism. She is also an alumna of the BMI and ASCAP Musical Theater Workshops.
