= Craig Bennett =

Australian journalist (born 1962)

Craig Bennett OAM
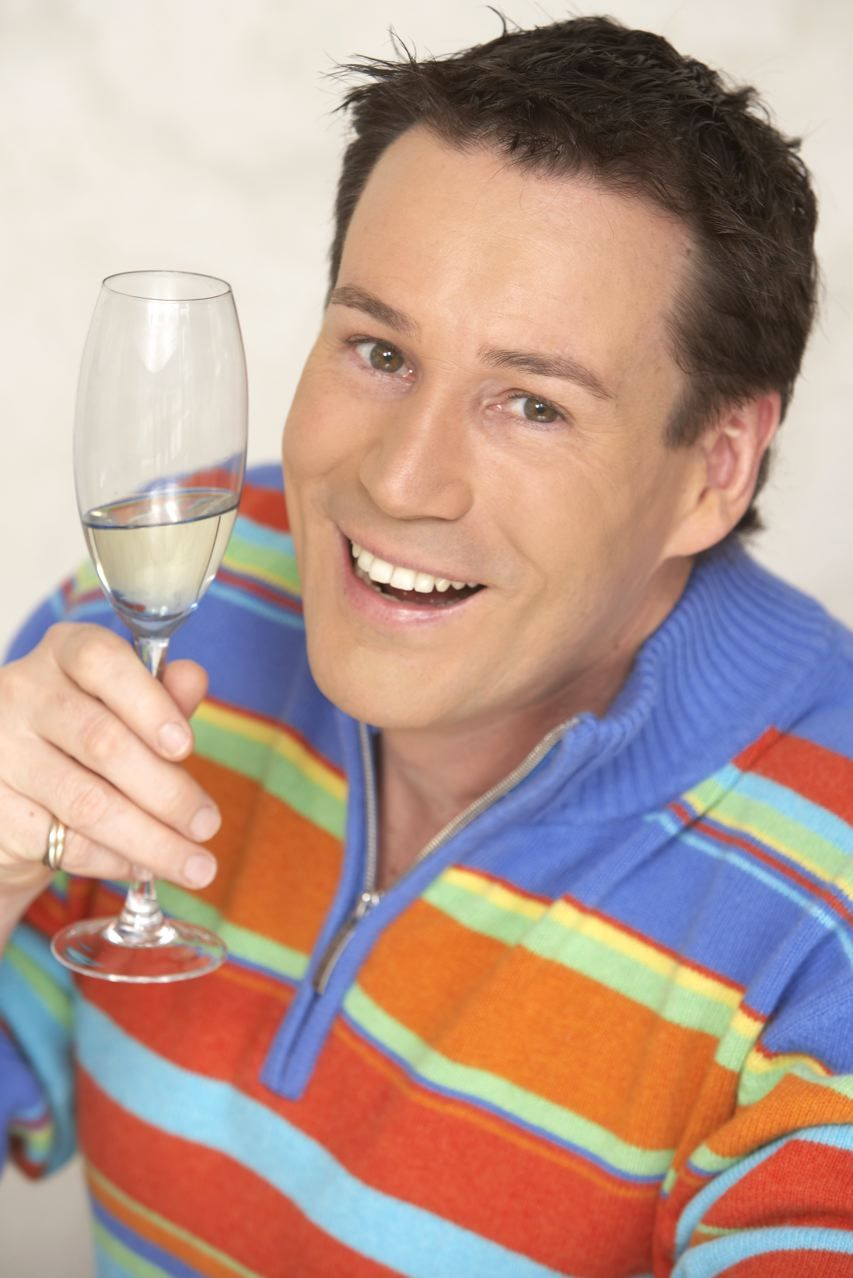
- Born: 19 October 1962 (age 64); Australia
- Occupations: Journalist; radio commentator; television personality; author; MC
- Years active: 1980s–present
- Known for: Entertainment reporter

Craig Bennett OAM (born 15 October 1962) is an Australian journalist, author, MC, radio commentator and television presenter, best known for his work as an entertainment reporter.

== Biography and career ==
=== Early TV appearances ===
Bennett first appeared on television in the 1970s, as a guest discussing his pet snakes, on programs such as The Don Lane Show, The Mike Walsh Show and Simon Townsend's Wonder World which led to him being dubbed "the snake boy of St Ives".

=== Newspaper journalist ===
Bennett started his professional media career in 1980 when he became a copy boy and then cadet journalist at The Daily Mirror and Daily Telegraph newspapers, covering general news stories.

=== Television ===
He moved into television several years later, initially appearing on children's program The Harry & Ralph Show, but becoming best known at covering entertainment news on programs such as Good Morning Australia, Good Morning Sydney, After Noon, Midday, At Home with John Mangos, Monday to Friday, Good Taste, Today Tonight, The Morning Show and The Daily Edition.

=== Entertainment reporter ===
Since 2013, Bennett has appeared on Network Ten morning program Studio 10, where he hosts regular showbiz segments and conducts in-depth interviews with local and international celebrities.

=== Radio ===
Bennett has also been a regular contributor on many Australian, New Zealand and South African radio stations throughout his career.

=== Stage ===
In 2016, Bennett starred as outrageous ugly sister Hernia in Bonnie Lythgoe's stage production of the pantomime Cinderella at Sydney's State Theatre. Cinderella also starred Gina Liano, Peter Everett, Tim Maddren and Jimmy Rees.

=== YouTube ===
Alongside television producer Kelley Shepherd, who created and executive produces the channel, Craig presents the YouTube channel Celebrity Drop.

=== Club Shows ===
In 2023, Craig and Denise Drysdale began performing in their club show Alive & Kicking, which performed in major clubs and theatres through NSW and Queensland. In 2024 Craig teamed up with Carlotta for their stage show The Two Of Us.

=== Publications ===
In 2007, Bennett published That's Quite a Dress You Almost Have On, a compilation of well known lines from various movies.

In 2019, he published his autobiography, True Confessions of a Shameless Gossip, detailing his career and his interactions with many well known entertainers throughout his career.

- That's Quite a Dress You Almost Have On; Penguin Books, 2007
- True Confessions of a Shameless Gossip; New Holland Publishers, 2019
