= Alexandre Manette =

Fictional character in A Tale of Two Cities

- First appearance: A Tale of Two Cities (1859)
- Created by: Charles Dickens

In-universe information
- Gender: Male
- Title: Doctor
- Occupation: Physician
- Family: Lucie Manette (daughter); Charles Darnay (son-in-law)
- Spouse: Unnamed wife (deceased)
- Nationality: French

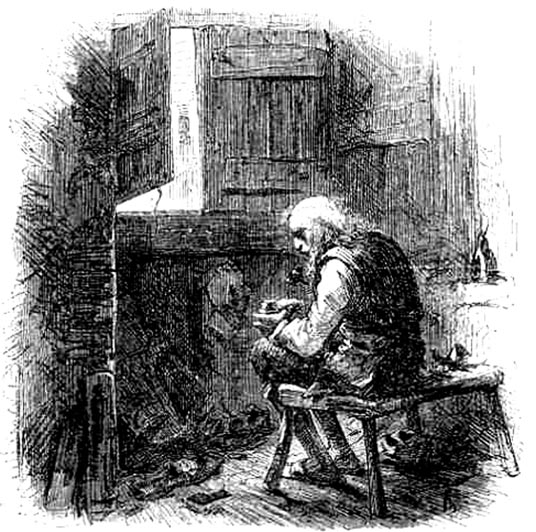

Doctor Alexandre Manette is a character in Charles Dickens' 1859 novel A Tale of Two Cities. He is Lucie's father, a brilliant physician, and spent eighteen years "in secret" as a prisoner in the Bastille prior to the French Revolution. He is imprisoned because in the course of his medical practice he learns of abusive actions by two members of the aristocratic Evrémonde family. While realizing the power at court of nobles such as the Evrémondes, Manette reports them to a minister of the royal government. He is seized from his young family and imprisoned under a lettre de cachet.

== Character and plot ==
At the start of the novel, Manette has been recently released from the Bastille after a long imprisonment. He is briefly given shelter in Paris by his former servant Ernest Defarge (who will subsequently be a leader of the storming of the Bastille) and is then reunited with his daughter Lucie. He does nothing but make shoes, a pastime that he adopted to distract himself from the tortures of prison. He is clearly not in his mind during this time; he speaks only when necessary, and has become so used to being a prisoner that he can hardly bear light or freedom. As he overcomes his past as a prisoner, due to his daughter's love and devotion to him, however, he resumes his occupation as a physician in England, and proves to be a kind, loving father who prizes his daughter’s happiness above all things. He even blesses her marriage to Charles Darnay; the nephew of the aristocrat who was responsible for his imprisonment (Darnay has completely renounced his family's ill-gotten fortune and is a good fellow, unaware of the harm that his uncle once inflicted on his current father-in-law). When Charles Darnay is arrested in France during the French Revolution, Manette is his witness that he is innocent. Unfortunately, Darnay is arrested again, due to a diary that Manette wrote when he was in jail, which sends Darnay back to prison. Darnay is condemned for his uncle's sins, but Sydney Carton (out of love for Lucie Manette), disguises himself as Charles and takes his place in the guillotine and dies for him.

== Cinematic and theatrical portrayals ==
- In the 1935 film A Tale of Two Cities, Dr. Manette is played by Henry B. Walthall.
- In the 1958 film adaptation, Dr. Alexandre Manette is played by Stephen Murray.
- In the 1980 TV movie A Tale of Two Cities, Dr. Manette is played by Peter Cushing.
- In the 2008 Broadway musical adaptation of A Tale of Two Cities, Dr. Alexandre Manette is played by Gregg Edelman.
