= Crossroads of Ravens =

2024 novel by Andrzej Sapkowski

- First edition cover
- Author: Andrzej Sapkowski
- Original title: Rozdroże kruków
- Translator: David French
- Cover artist: Tomasz Piorunowski
- Language: Polish
- Series: The Witcher
- Genre: Fantasy
- Published: 29 November 2024 (SuperNowa)
- Publication place: Poland
- English publication date: 30 September 2025 (Gollancz/Orbit)
- Media type: Paperback, e-book (Note: A few days after the book's publication, special hardcover editions also appeared, but these are available exclusively in one online bookstore.)
- Pages: 292 (Note: 292 pages in the standard editions, 304 pages in the special "black hardcover" edition with a bestiary.)
- ISBN: 9788375782073
- Preceded by: Season of Storms

Crossroads of Ravens (Polish: Rozdroże kruków (Note: In some Polish-language library databases, online bookstores, and press articles, the book is listed under the title Wiedźmin: Rozdroże kruków.)) is the seventh novel and ninth overall book in the Witcher series written by Polish fantasy writer Andrzej Sapkowski, first published in Poland on 29 November 2024. It is a prequel to both the Witcher Saga (1994–1999) and the short story collections: Sword of Destiny (1992) and The Last Wish (1993). The novel is preceded only by the short story "The Road with No Return", which features Geralt's mother as the main character.

== Plot ==
Crossroads of Ravens is a prequel to all canonical stories about Geralt of Rivia published to date and tells the story of his youth. Although characters such as Vesemir or Eskel are mentioned, the only character known from the earlier chapters of the saga to appear in the book is the priestess Nenneke. An important plot thread is the genesis of Monstrum, or Description of the Witcher–an anonymous anti-witcher hate literature published several decades before the events of the novel–and the massacre at Kaer Morhen that took place shortly after its publication, during which a mob incited by the theses contained in the text launched an attack on the keep, leading to the death of almost all the witchers present there and most of the attackers.

Shortly after completing his training and setting out on the trail, Geralt kills a deserter who attempted to rape a young peasant girl and is convicted of murder. He is saved from hanging by the elderly, ailing witcher, Preston Holt, who becomes his mentor. Some time later, Geralt is ambushed by Estevan Trillo da Cunha, the prefect of the guard of the Kingdom of Kaedwen, who demands evidence to accuse Holt of murdering three people, but the witcher refuses. Geralt learns from the priestesses of Melitele that Holt had escaped the massacre at Kaer Morhen, leaving his companions to die. The authorities hanged several attackers, but spared the three main ringleaders, subsequently killed by a guilt-ridden Holt. At some point, Holt informs Geralt that he will no longer be his mentor and that from now on he is to act on his own. Some time later, Geralt responds to the invitation of the mage Artamon of Asguth–who turns out to be the author of Monstrum–and kills him after discovering that he commissioned his subordinates–Beauregard Frick, Cibor Ponti and Meritxell–to murder Holt and all the priestesses of Melitele. Holt surrenders to justice, confessing to killing the ringleaders of the attack on Kaer Morhen and taking the blame for Artamon's death. Geralt reveals the truth to da Cunha, but prefect explains that Artamon's mistress–the influential Countess Cervia Herrada de Graffiacane–is interested in Holt's execution, as she suspects him of killing her son–a bastard born from her relationship with Artamon. In his farewell letter, Holt reveals to Geralt that he had been giving him clues about Artamon, with the hope that the young witcher will complete his work and eliminate the mage, but he had abandoned this intention and thus pushed him away. Geralt manages to thwart the slaughter of priestesses of Melitele at the hands of Frick, Ponti and Meritxell, but is seriously wounded and loses his witcher gear. After a long convalescence, Geralt recovers his medallion from de Graffiacane–who, upon seeing him, dies of a heart attack–and then kills Frick and Ponti. His confrontation with Meritxell is interrupted by the appearance of a scolopendromorph attacking children; faced with a choice, Geralt rejects his desire for revenge and decides to act in accordance with what he accepts as his calling–he throws himself at the monster, allowing Meritxell to escape.

== Background and writing ==
Despite the demand, when asked about the next books, Sapkowski repeated that the Witcher Saga ended with The Lady of the Lake (1999); it is a closed story and he does not intend to return to it. The Witcher later became a global phenomenon thanks to the video game series developed by CD Projekt Red, the first part of which was released in 2007. Additionally, in 2019 Netflix began airing an English-language TV series based on Sapkowski's works set in Witcher world.

Despite earlier assurances, in 2013 Sapkowski finished writing a new book about Geralt, Season of Storms, with plot set between his short stories from collection The Last Wish. In June 2018, Sapkowski announced that he no longer ruled out writing another part of the saga. He added that he would like to set the action of such a book before the plot of the already published works. On 1 February 2023, during a meeting at the Taipei International Book Exhibition, Sapkowski announced that he plans to write new books set in Witcher universe, however, he did not provide more details at that time. In August of the same year, during an online meeting with Ukrainian fans, he revealed that he was working intensively on a new book about Geralt, which he will finish writing in about a year. In November 2023, during Comic Con Vienna, he revealed the first details about the upcoming book. In August 2024, in an interview for the magazine Chimères, Sapkowski announced that he had completed work on the book.

According to the agreement with Sapkowski's publisher, SuperNowa, title and cover artwork of the book were to be revealed exclusively by Nowa Fantastyka magazine in issue 12/2024, the publication date of which was brought forward from December to November 22, 2024. Additionally, this issue of the magazine was also supposed to include a fragment of Crossroads of Ravens. Although Nowa Fantastyka only posted a censored cover of the December issue on social media and websites, the day before the issue went on sale, one of the distributors of Prószyński Media–the magazine publisher–violated the terms of the contract and published the full version, revealing the artwork and the title of the book. On the same day, it was officially confirmed that the Crossroads of Ravens will be a prequel to the saga, depicting Geralt as a young witcher. A day later, Nowa Fantastyka published a fragment of the first chapter of the book, as previously announced.

Crossroads of Ravens was published in Poland on 29 November 2024 in a paperback, and on December 1 as e-book. Three days after the book's publication, SuperNowa announced that it would also be published in limited editions with alternative cover artworks–one referring to the Netflix series, and the other three designed by CD Projekt. Two of them were published in hardcover, and the "black hardcover" (Polish: czarna twarda) edition additionally included a bestiary with Michał Niewiara's drawings. An audiobook version, in the form of a audio play featuring i.a. Krzysztof Gosztyła as the narrator, was released by SuperNowa and Audioteka on May 29, 2026.

== Reception ==
The publisher did not disclose how many copies of the book were sold, only saying that it "is selling as expected and even better". Within three days, over 20,000 copies were sold on Allegro (the largest Polish e-commerce platform) alone. According to Onet's estimates, at least 30,000 copies of the book were sold after three days, which was a "staggering" result given the Polish book market. Crossroads of Ravens won the 2024 Janusz A. Zajdel Award for Best Novel, the 2024 Empik Bestsellers award for the best-selling book in the Popular Literature category, the 2024 Lubimyczytać.pl's Book of the Year Award for Best Fantasy Book, the 2025 Nowa Fantastyka Award for Best Polish-language Book, and received a Silver Distinction (3rd place) for Best Novel at the 2025 Jerzy Żuławski Literary Awards. Śląski Klub Fantastyki awarded Sapkowski the 2025 Śląkfa award for Best Author, stating that "Crossroads of Ravens is exactly the story we have been longing for all these years".

Anna Garas from Gry-Online praised the book as a work expanding the lore of the world, which in her opinion does so in a much better way than the Netflix works–Nightmare of the Wolf and Blood Origins. According to her, Sapkowski seems to be telling Netflix's screenwriters what the real origins of the characters and the world is, making it easier for the reader to forget about the spin-offs. She noted, however, that "Crossroads of Ravens suffers from the same condition that the Witcher Saga and the Hussite Trilogy suffered from–towards the end, strange things start to happen". Michał Jarecki from Spider's Web stated that the author "avoids excess more than ever", which ultimately makes Crossroads of Ravens a book that "has a better structure and is more specific, without the slightest signs of beating around the bush", while Sapkowski "still masterfully builds tension, uses humorous and malicious dialogues". Polish film critic and book translator Bartosz Czartoryski considered Crossroads of Ravens to be "probably Sapkowski's most specific and objective work" and "a kind of witcher-y best of". He also noted that "it's tempting to read the book as a coming-of-age story, an novel about initiation" because it presents Geralt as a person "just learning about life and the difficult art of making choices, often tripping over his own feet" who acquires the characteristics appropriate to the character known from the saga only in the finale. Unlike Garas, Czartoryski considered the ending of the book to be "excellent".

SuperNowa has been frequently criticized for the poor quality of the paperback edition and the lack of pre-orders for the hardcover edition, which went on sale nearly two weeks later, on 10 December, and is only available in one specific bookstore at prices higher than regular one. Garas stated that the paperback version is "rather cheap edition intended for reading on the train or at the airport", not a book written by the "titan of Polish fantasy". Maciej Tomczak from online magazine Fahrenheit spoke in a similar tone, stating: "The quality of the first edition [...] deserves rather negative attention. Although aesthetic and free of editorial errors, [it] is more like a pocket-sized cheap paperback publication than a fully professional production."

== Possible sequel ==
Shortly before the publication of Crossroads of Ravens, in an interview for the Polish weekly periodical Polityka, Sapkowski announced that it would not be the last book set in the Witcher universe. Again, he did not provide more details, saying only that "there will be a new book" and "if I set the time horizon to three or four years, it will be without much risk".

== Translations ==
Crossroads of Ravens was published on 30 September 2025 simultaneously in twenty-one languages, including English (translated by David French). In the UK, the book was published by Gollancz, and in the US by Orbit.

- Arabic:
  - Egypt: الويتشر: مَفرِق الغِدفان (Aser Al-Kotob, 2025)
- Bulgarian: Кръстопътят на гарваните (Ciela, 2025)
- Croatian: Raskrižje gavrana (Egmont, 2025)
- Czech: Rozcestí krkavců (Leonardo, 2025)
- Dutch: Het kruispunt der raven (Boekerij, 2025)
- English: Crossroads of Ravens
  - United Kingdom: Gollancz, 2025
  - United States: Orbit, 2025
- Finnish: Korppien tienhaara (WSOY, 2025)
- French: La Croisée des corbeaux (Bragelonne, 2025)
- German: Kreuzweg der Raben (dtv Verlagsgesellschaft, 2025)
- Greek: Τα σταυροδρόμι των Κορακιών (Selini, 2025)
- Hungarian: Hollók válaszútja (Gabo, 2025)
- Italian: Il crocevia dei corvi (Casa Editrice Nord, 2025)
- Japanese: カラスの十字路 (Hayakawa Shobō, 2025)
- Portuguese:
  - Portugal: Encruzilhada dos Corvos (Edições Saída de Emergência, 2025)
  - Brazil: Encruzilhada dos corvos (Editora WMF Martins Fontes, 2025)
- Romanian: Răscrucea corbilor (Nemira, 2025)
- Russian: Перекресток воронов (AST Publishing Group, 2025)
- Serbian: Raskršće gavranova (Čarobna knjiga, 2025)
- Slovak: Rázcestie krkavcov (Albatros Media Slovakia, 2025)
- Slovenian: Razpotje krokarjev (Mladinska Knjiga, 2025)
- Swedish: Korpens vägskäl (Gondol, 2025)
- Ukrainian: Роздоріжжя круків (Klub Simeĭnoho Dozvillia, 2025)
