= The Hexer =

The Hexer may also refer to:

- An early translation of the title of Andrzej Sapkowski's Polish-language book series known more commonly as The Witcher
- The Hexer (film), a 2001 Polish fantasy film directed by Marek Brodzki and based on Andrzej Sapkowski's book series The Witcher
- The Hexer (TV series), a Polish fantasy television series which aired in 2002, also based on The Witcher
