= Season of Storms =

Witcher novel by Andrzej Sapkowski

- First edition cover
- Author: Andrzej Sapkowski
- Original title: Sezon burz
- Translator: David French
- Language: Polish
- Series: The Witcher
- Genre: Fantasy
- Published: 6 November 2013 (superNOWA)
- Publication place: Poland
- English publication date: May 2018 (Gollancz)
- Media type: Paperback
- Pages: 384
- Preceded by: The Lady of the Lake
- Followed by: Crossroads of Ravens

Season of Storms (Polish original title: Sezon burz) is the sixth novel and eighth overall book in the Witcher series written by Polish fantasy writer Andrzej Sapkowski, first published in Poland on 6 November 2013. It is not a sequel to the original Witcher Saga; rather, it is set between the short stories in the first book in the series, The Last Wish.

Fox Children, the second installment of The Witcher comic book series published by Dark Horse Comics, is based on one of the chapters of Season of Storms. The book, with translations by David French, was published in May 2018 in hardcover format in the US and paperback format by UK Orbit (US) and Gollancz (UK). It is also available in both territories as an e-book and audiobook.

== Plot ==
Geralt of Rivia fights a dangerous monster whose only goal in life is to kill people. Shortly afterwards, he is arrested, resulting in the loss of two of his priceless witcher swords. With a little help from his friend Dandelion and his connections, he does everything he can to regain his work tools. In the meantime, he gets into an affair with the sorceress Lytta Neyd (nicknamed Coral), meets influential people, and the social margin associated with the country where he lost his swords - Kerack. Geralt soon gets dragged into two dangerous conspiracies (one involving a group of sorcerers, and another involving King Belohun and his bitter sons). These events and the undisguised and reciprocated reluctance of the magicians towards Geralt (who turn out to be related to this story) make the whole thing a series of failures, during which the hero is forced to make difficult decisions.

The epilogue of the book is set years after The Witcher Saga.

== Polish audio version ==
In 2014, alongside The Last Wish and The Sword of Destiny, Fonopolis and audioteka.pl released Polish audio plays based on Season of Storms. This was voiced by 84 actors, including Krzysztof Banaszyk as Geralt, Karolina Gorczyca as Coral, Anna Dereszowska as Yennefer, Sławomir Pacek as Dandelion, Adam Ferency as Pinety, Piotr Bajor as Xander and Krzysztof Gosztyła as the narrator.

== See also ==
- Polish literature
- Fantasy literature
