= The Witcher IV =

Upcoming video game

- Developer: CD Projekt Red (Note: Additional work by Fool's Theory)
- Publisher: CD Projekt Red
- Director: Sebastian Kalemba
- Writer: Philipp Weber
- Composers: Marcin Przybyłowicz; P.T. Adamczyk
- Series: The Witcher
- Engine: Unreal Engine 5
- Platforms: PlayStation 5; Windows; Xbox Series X/S
- Release: 2028
- Genre: Action role-playing
- Mode: Single-player

The Witcher IV (Note: Polish: Wiedźmin IV) is an upcoming action role-playing game developed and published by CD Projekt Red. It is the planned first installment of a new trilogy in The Witcher series, which is based on the book series of the same name by Andrzej Sapkowski. The game is set after the events of The Witcher 3: Wild Hunt (2015). Unlike the original trilogy, which featured book protagonist Geralt of Rivia as the playable character, The Witcher IV features his adoptive daughter, Ciri, as the protagonist. The Witcher IV is being developed for release on PlayStation 5, Windows, and Xbox Series X/S. It is planned to release in 2028.

== Gameplay ==
The Witcher IV is an action role-playing game set in the open world of The Witcher's Continent. The player controls Ciri, a monster hunter, exploring the world on foot and may summon her horse, Kelpie, at will. The game introduces new playable regions, including the Kovir region, which was only mentioned in previous Witcher games and explored in the books.

== Development ==
In March 2022, CD Projekt Red (CDPR) announced that they were working on a new game in The Witcher series. By October, the studio revealed that this entry, internally codenamed "Project Polaris", would initiate a new trilogy. In November, Sebastian Kalemba announced that he had been appointed as the "Polaris" game director the month prior after spending 15 months as a creative director on the project. Following the release of Cyberpunk 2077 (2020), CDPR made structural changes to its production process, aimed at refining development phases and fostering cohesive designs for future projects, including the new Witcher game. CD Projekt Red sought to address issues from Cyberpunk 2077's development during work on The Witcher IV by mandating the creation of more complete documentation that must be shared across the company. It remained in pre-production from May 2022 until November 2024, when full production began. During the pre-production period, CD Projekt Red began moving staff off of work on Cyberpunk 2077 following the release of its Phantom Liberty expansion with the "Polaris" team reaching 403 members in March 2024. By March 2026, 499 employees were working on the project. By May 2026, the development team on The Witcher IV had grown to 513 staff members, over double that of The Witcher 3's core 240 person team. CD Projekt temporarily assigned a small team from Fool's Theory, the developer of The Witcher (2007) remake, to assist CDPR with The Witcher IV due to shared assets and technology. Polish analyst Mateusz Chrzanowski claimed that the The Witcher IV's development will cost $390 million with another $390 million spent on marketing, making it one of the most expensive video games to develop.

Game director Sebastian Kalemba stated that the developers intend to expand player agency by offering more narrative choices. Drawing on their experience with Cyberpunk 2077, the studio also seeks to enhance gameplay flexibility, including character builds and encounters, and create greater coherence across main story missions, side quests, and open world activities.

=== Narrative ===
The developers aim to maintain established canon, ensuring player choices in The Witcher 3: Wild Hunt (2015) do not create contradictions. Recognizing potential player unfamiliarity with previous titles, CDPR intends The Witcher IV to serve as both an accessible entry point and a continuation for veteran players. The studio had long considered a game featuring Ciri as the main protagonist, describing her as a "very organic, logical choice". As the adoptive daughter of the original trilogy's protagonist Geralt of Rivia, she previously appeared as a supporting and occasionally playable character in Wild Hunt. Narrative lead Philipp Weber initially wanted Geralt to remain the protagonist in The Witcher IV but the character would "always have an important role" in Ciri's narrative. CDPR's franchise and lore designer, Cian Maher, stated that "The Witcher as a title refers to both Geralt and Ciri and always has", arguing that Ciri was "more important" to the plot than Geralt. Unlike Geralt, a seasoned monster hunter throughout the series, Ciri in The Witcher IV is depicted as an aspiring hunter who is "about to form her own codex on her own terms". Ciri is a central protagonist in some of Andrzej Sapkowski's original Witcher novels such as The Tower of the Swallow and The Lady of the Lake.

Sebastian Kalemba said that CD Projekt Red wanted to "explore what it means to truly become a witcher" with Ciri in The Witcher IV and described Ciri as "the very first witcher by choice". The Witcher IV introduces the new Witcher School of the Lynx with Ciri wearing a Lynx Medallion. The School of the Lynx did not appear in The Witcher novels but was detailed in fan fiction. Ciri previously wore a Medallion representing the School of the Cat in The Witcher 3 and had trained with Geralt under the School of the Wolf at Kaer Morhen in her youth but she did not undertake the Trial of the Grasses to officially become a Witcher.

=== Casting ===
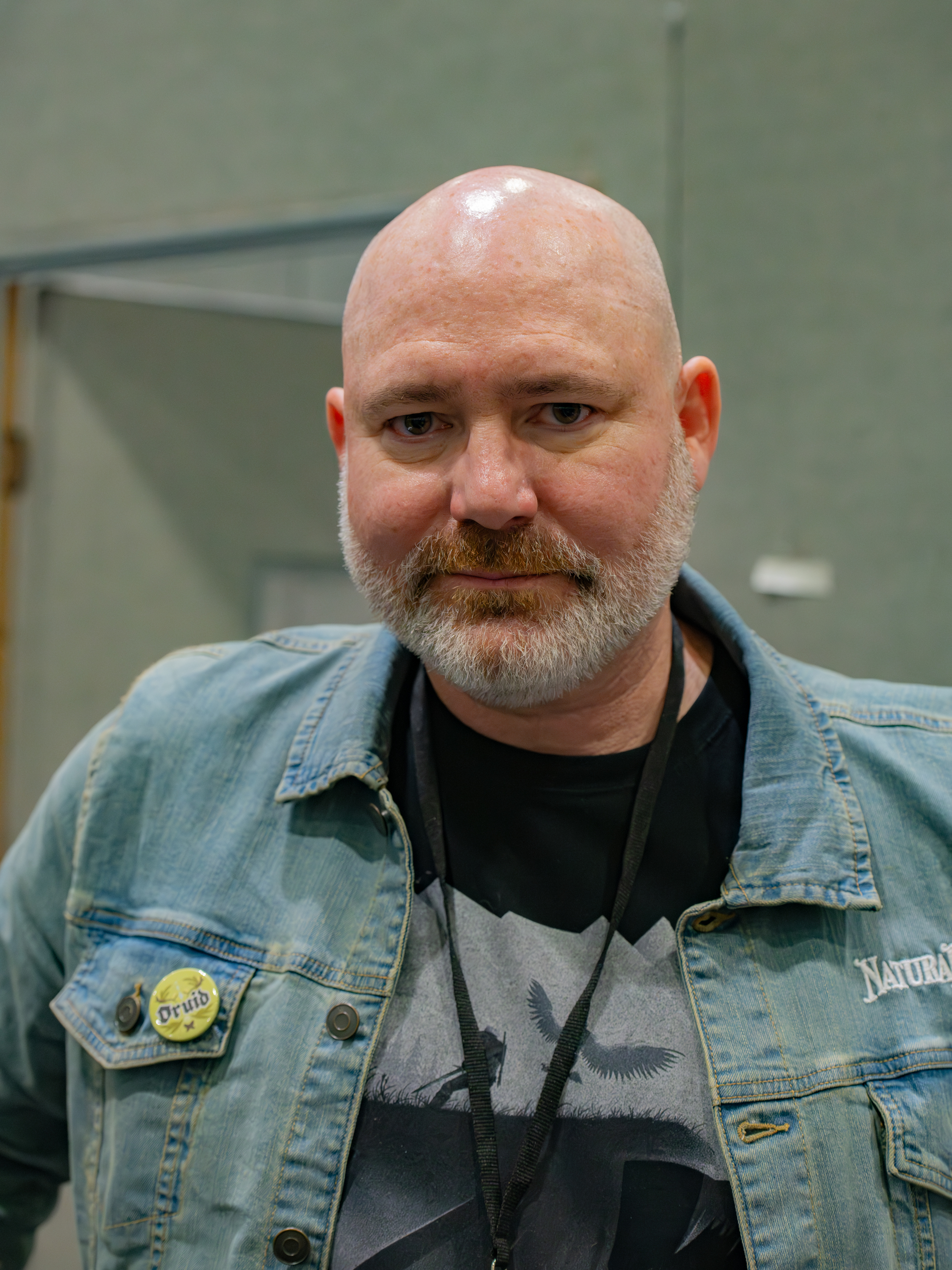
Doug Cockle will reprise his role as Geralt of Rivia in The Witcher IV.

In December 2024, it was announced that Irish actress Ciara Berkeley had been cast as Ciri, taking over the role from Jo Wyatt, who voiced the character in Wild Hunt. Looking ahead, CD Projekt Red knew they would be creating future trilogy focused on Ciri so needed a younger actress to portray Ciri who had "a certain agility when recording the character in motion capture" according to Sebastian Kalemba. Casting the new Ciri took over a year, looking at hundreds of actresses. Doug Cockle will reprise his role as Geralt.

=== Technology ===
==== Graphics ====
CD Projekt Red is developing The Witcher IV with a "console-first" approach, breaking with their traditional approach of targeting PC first before scaling down to consoles. CD Projekt Red said they wanted to avoid the same issues with Cyberpunk 2077 that had been developed with PC in mind first as it suffered from serious performance issues at launch on Xbox One and PlayStation 4 consoles. With The Witcher IV, CDPR vice president Jakub Knapik explained that "it's easier to scale up than down" after the studio had been able to set a visual and technical foundation on weaker consoles. The game is being developed using Unreal Engine 5, which CDPR adopted after transitioning away from their proprietary REDengine—the technology previously used for The Witcher 2: Assassins of Kings (2011) and Wild Hunt. The decision to move to Unreal Engine 5 was informed by CD Projekt Red seeking to have multiple titles in production simultaneously. REDengine was less flexible as it had to be adapted for each new title. REDengine was built for single-player games exclusively so it could not support any future multiplayer development without major updates. For The Witcher IV, CD Project Red partnered with Epic Games to collaborate on Unreal Engine technology, including the engine's open-world capabilities, improving open-world asset streaming and optimizing performance. CD Projekt Red through their technology collaboration with Epic Games sought to push open-world game design further across the broader industry with the technology they developed for The Witcher IV being upstreamed to Unreal Engine 5 for the benefit of other studios.

The Witcher IV will feature the higher quality hardware-accelerated Lumen ray tracing engine in Unreal Engine 5 rather than software Lumen. The Witcher IV will incorporate Nvidia's RTX Mega Geometry system on PC to accelerate the building of bounding volume hierarchies (BVHs) during ray tracing in scenes with high levels of geometry. An RTX Mega Geometry and path tracing demo from Nvidia was shown at GDC 2026, using assets for The Witcher IV provided by CD Projekt Red, featuring 60 million plants and one million trees across a 5km×5km area totalling more than 10 million polygons.

The Witcher IV uses Nanite Foliage, introduced in Unreal Engine 5.6, to represent distant foliage using voxel primitives over traditional triangles. This is faster to render as every leaf and pine needle in foliage can be represented as a cube the size of a pixel. Unlike a 2D representation, 3D voxels are volumetric and can be affected by dynamic lighting and shadows. Michał Janiszewski, environment art director, explained that "95% of our screen is often foliage" which needs to be rendered quickly and felt that the studio could not achieve the same forest density without Nanite Foliage. Nanite Foliage's LOD transitions are handled via voxelization and Hierachical LOD (HLOD) blending that groups objects together, reducing memory calls and visible pop-in. Nanite Foliage was first demonstrated with The Witcher IV's tech demo at Unreal Fest 2025.

==== Animation ====
In February 2026, it was reported that Lucie Hennet had been hired by CD Projekt Red as a cinematic animator. Hennet had previously worked on Clair Obscur: Expedition 33 refining raw motion capture footage into facial and body animations. The Witcher IV will feature a new horse animation system that simulates horse muscles moving under the skin, similar to that found in Red Dead Redemption 2. CD Projekt Red are using Unreal Engine's multi-character Motion Matching so the animations when Ciri mounts her horse Kelpie are synchronised. Ciri's face model is a "direct copy" from The Witcher 3 except for two subtle changes to give her slightly raised eyebrows and a more relaxed eye area. These changes were made in order to give animators more detailed control over the character's facial animations through the MetaHuman Creator in Unreal Engine 5.

== Marketing and release ==
The Witcher IV was announced with a cinematic trailer at the Game Awards in December 2024. The trailer was created in collaboration with Platige Image, an animation studio responsible for producing the intro cinematics for the previous Witcher games. It was pre-rendered in-engine on a then-unannounced GeForce RTX 5090 graphics card, rather than displaying real-time rendered scenes. During the State of Unreal presentation in June 2025, a tech demo for The Witcher IV was showcased, running on PlayStation 5. The demo was praised by individuals including Alice Ruppert.

Piotr Nielubowicz, CD Projekt's chief financial officer, stated in March 2025 that The Witcher IV would not be released before 2027. The game is scheduled to release in 2028 for PlayStation 5, Windows, and Xbox Series X/S. CD Projekt's joint CEO Michał Nowakowski stated that the studio will "most likely not release expansions" for the planned trilogy as it did for The Witcher 3: Wild Hunt, explaining that doing so would be difficult due to their goal of releasing the titles within a six-year timeframe, focusing instead on core game releases.
