= Nowa Koalicja =

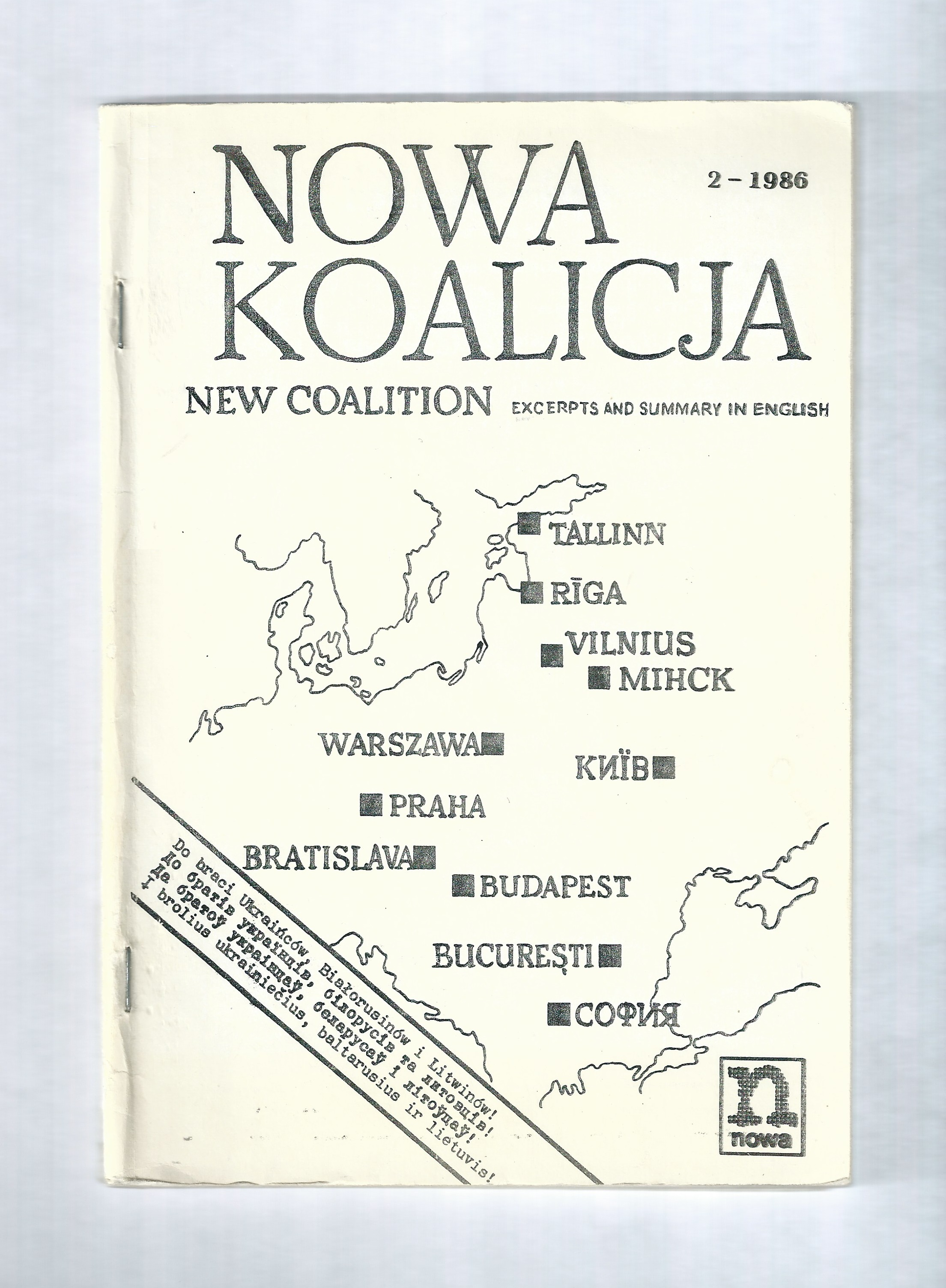
Cover of Nowa Koalicja - New Coalition journal in English, Polish and ten other languages of Central and East Europe

Nowa Koalicja – New Coalition – was an underground journal of the Solidarity social and political movement devoted to Central and Eastern Europe, including the then European republics of the Soviet Union. Founded in 1984 and published in 1985-1989 in Warsaw, Poland, the journal promoted international cooperation of pro-democracy and pro-national independence social and political organizations and movements of Central and Eastern Europe with the aim to abolish the Eastern Bloc, including the Warsaw Pact, Comecon, and the Soviet Union, and to reconstruct sovereign and democratic nation states. To prevent a recurrence of historic conflicts, the journal advocated preservation of the existing borders, including the borders of the Soviet republics. Simultaneously, the journal rejected as obsolete all historic projects of a Central European or Eastern European federation or confederation of states, and it promoted an alternative in the form of integration with the rest of Europe, particularly Western Europe.

The journal was supported by the underground Solidarity movement and by the Government of the Republic of Poland in exile in London, UK. Grzegorz Kostrzewa-Zorbas, the founder and Editor of Nowa Koalicja – New Coalition, later implemented its ideas as a policy director in the Ministry of Foreign Affairs (1990-1992) and the Ministry of National Defense (1992) of the Third Polish Republic. The first two issues of the journal, out of the total of eight, were published by Independent Publishing House NOWA, the first and largest independent and uncensored publisher in Communist Poland.

Published in Polish with excerpts and summaries in English, and with occasional documents and infographics in several Central European and Eastern European languages, Nowa Koalicja – New Coalition was distributed in Poland, other countries of Central and Eastern Europe, including the Soviet republics, and among political and cultural organizations of the nations of the region in exile in Western Europe, the United States of America, and Canada. An international network of information sharing, underground publishing, and political initiatives emerged around the journal.

== See also ==
- Cold War
- Democratization
- Dissolution of the Soviet Union
- European integration
- Polish underground press
- Revolutions of 1989
