= The Lady of the Lake (Sapkowski novel) =

1999 fantasy novel by Andrzej Sapkowski

- First edition cover
- Author: Andrzej Sapkowski
- Original title: Pani Jeziora
- Language: Polish
- Series: The Witcher
- Genre: Fantasy
- Published: 1999 (superNOWA) (Polish); 2017 (Gollancz)
- Publication place: Poland
- Media type: Paperback
- Pages: 544
- Preceded by: The Tower of the Swallow
- Followed by: Season of Storms (Interludes and Epilogue)

The Lady of the Lake (Polish: Pani Jeziora) is the fifth novel in The Witcher series and the final in the original Witcher Saga, written by Polish fantasy writer Andrzej Sapkowski, first published in Poland in 1999. It is a sequel to the fourth Witcher novel, The Tower of the Swallow.

== Plot ==
King Arthur's knight Sir Galahad stumbles upon Ciri bathing by a lake in ancient Britain. Ciri tells him her story, warning that it does not have a happy ending.

In the Northern Kingdoms centuries after the main story, the sorceress Condwiramurs is apprenticed to Nimue, the Lady of the Lake, to study the legend of Geralt and Ciri. Condwiramurs has clairvoyant dreams and recovers many scenes about them.

Through the events of The Tower of the Swallow, Ciri portalled to the world of the Aen Elle elves, who have clashes with unicorns. Her dreams reveal more about her talents, as well her loved ones' troubles, but a magical barrier imprisons her. The sage Avallac'h explains that as Lara Dorren's last descendant, the Elven-designed engineered gene she carries will make her child the most powerful magic-user in history, able to save the world from a prophesied cataclysm, and that Ciri must bear this child with their king, Auberon. Ciri reluctantly agrees, but Auberon fails to perform several times. Avallac'h assures her that once she bears the child, she will be returned to her own time. However, Eredin Breacc Glas, the commander of a cavalry unit, tells Ciri they will never let her go.

Back on the Continent, many still search for the vanished Ciri. Stefan Skellen, the coroner of Nilfgaard, along with bounty hunter Leo Bonhart, join the sorcerer Vilgefortz in Stygga Castle in Ebbing where he has tortured and manipulated the sorceress Yennefer for information. Further North, after many attempts to find Ciri, and believing that Yennefer betrayed them, Geralt and his company – Dandelion, Regis, Milva, Angoulême, and Cahir – winter in the duchy of Toussaint, ruled by the Duchess Anna Henrietta, Dandelion's lover. Geralt is distracted by monster-hunting and an affair with the Duchess's cousin, the Nilfgaardian sorceress Fringilla Vigo, a member of the Lodge of Sorceresses whose secret mission is to delay him so they can find Ciri first. Then Geralt overhears a meeting between Skellen and Nilfgaardian nobles plotting to overthrow Emperor Emhyr that mentions Vilgefortz's location and that Yennefer is his victim-prisoner. Dandelion stays behind as Geralt and the others leave.

Ciri tries to escape on her horse Kelpie but the barrier stops her. She is confronted by unicorns, but the unicorn Ihuarraquax, who she previously saved, (Note: as depicted in The Time of Contempt.) vouches for her. The unicorns reveal she can bypass the barrier by boat. Before leaving, she finds Auberon dying after overdosing on an aphrodisiac Eredin gave him, stays with him until he dies, then steals a boat. Eredin confronts her but she escapes to join Ihuarraquax, the other unicorns and Kelpie. Eredin and his riders give chase and they battle with the unicorns. Ihuarraquax helps her jump worlds but the riders catch up with them so he stays behind to let Ciri escape. After jumping between several worlds and times without finding her own, she meets Nimue and Condwiramurs in the far future, who conjure the right portal for her.

Throughout, the decisive battle of Brenna between the allied Northern Kingdoms and the invading army of Nilfgaard is narrated from various points of view, primarily by Jarre, a scribe from Melitele's temple, and "Rusty", a halfling field surgeon. The Nilfgaardians are eventually routed by Redanian forces. Nilfgaard is forced back across its original border and sues for peace. Jarre writes his memoirs in his old age. Rusty dies in a pandemic of "red death" (which Ciri accidentally caused while jumping across time and space).

Ciri reaches Stygga Castle to save Yennefer, but Vilgefortz imprisons her since he plans to inseminate her to claim the prophesied magic user. Geralt and his group storm the castle and free Yennefer, but Geralt's companions Milva and Angoulême are killed, and Cahir is killed by Bonhart, who is himself killed by Ciri. When Geralt, Yennefer, and Regis confront Vilgefortz, Regis is killed, but Geralt kills Vilgefortz with help from an amulet gifted by Fringilla. Geralt and Yennefer reunite with Ciri.

Geralt and Ciri fight the last of Skellen's mercenaries until a Nilfgaardian force led by Emhyr suddenly arrives. Skellen is arrested for treason. Geralt recognizes Emhyr as Ciri's father, who married her mother Pavetta under the name Duny, (Note: as depicted in "A Question of Price".) and realizes "Duny's" death was faked. To produce Ciri's prophesied child and save the world, Emhyr plans to make her Empress and impregnate her. Since Geralt recognizes him and Yennefer knows the genealogy, Emhyr means to execute them to keep the incest secret, but grants them the option of committing suicide together. As they prepare to do so, Ciri interrupts them, because Emhyr changed his mind and left after seeing Ciri's tears over losing the only loving parents she had known.

Geralt and Yennefer ride with Ciri, who retraces her steps in Ebbing to punish those who hurt her. She and Yennefer are summoned by the Lodge, and Yennefer goes ahead while Ciri and Geralt go to Toussaint. They find Dandelion about to be executed by Anna Henrietta. The trio departs Toussaint, and Ciri goes to meet the Lodge while Geralt and Dandelion head to Rivia. The Lodge states that since Emhyr has married a "false Ciri" that Ciri cannot claim the Cintran throne; they plan for her to become the mistress of Prince Tankred, the Kovirian heir, to bear the prophesied child that they will raise. Ciri asks to leave with Yennefer, to honour a promise to meet Geralt in Rivia, then return to the Lodge afterwards. Phillipa Eilhart casts the decisive vote in favour of letting Ciri go, arguing it's Ciri's destiny.

While Geralt is in Rivia meeting his friends Yarpen Zigren and Zoltan Chivay, a riot and pogrom erupts with humans killing non-humans. Geralt fights to save his dwarven friends, but is impaled on a pitchfork. Yennefer and Triss Merigold conjure a storm to disperse the rioters, but they and Ciri find Geralt on the verge of death. Yennefer gives so much of her magic to heal Geralt that she loses consciousness. Ihuarraquax appears out of a foggy lake and channels his power through Ciri to heal Geralt. Guided by him, Ciri and her friends put Geralt and Yennefer's bodies on a boat that appears out of fog. The three disappear into the fog. Geralt and Yennefer awake in an unknown location (hinted to be Avalon) and comfort each other.

Ciri finishes her tale. When Galahad asks if that's the end, Ciri says that she doesn't want the story to end like that. She claims the tale ends with Yennefer and Geralt getting married and living happily ever after, but cries as she says it. Galahad invites her to Camelot, which she accepts. The two ride toward Camelot, holding hands.

== Translations ==
- Czech (Leonardo, 2000)
- Dutch (Luitingh-Sijthoff, 2016)
- Finnish (WSOY, 2016)
- French (Bragelonne, 2011)
- German (DTV, 2011)
- Italian (Editrice_Nord, 2015)
- Lithuanian (Eridanas, 2007)
- Russian (AST, 2000)
- Spanish (Bibliopolis, 2006)

The English translation was released by Victor Gollancz on March 14, 2017 (Orbit/US) and March 16, 2017 (Orion/UK).
