= Ciri =

Fictional character from the Witcher series

- The Witcher character
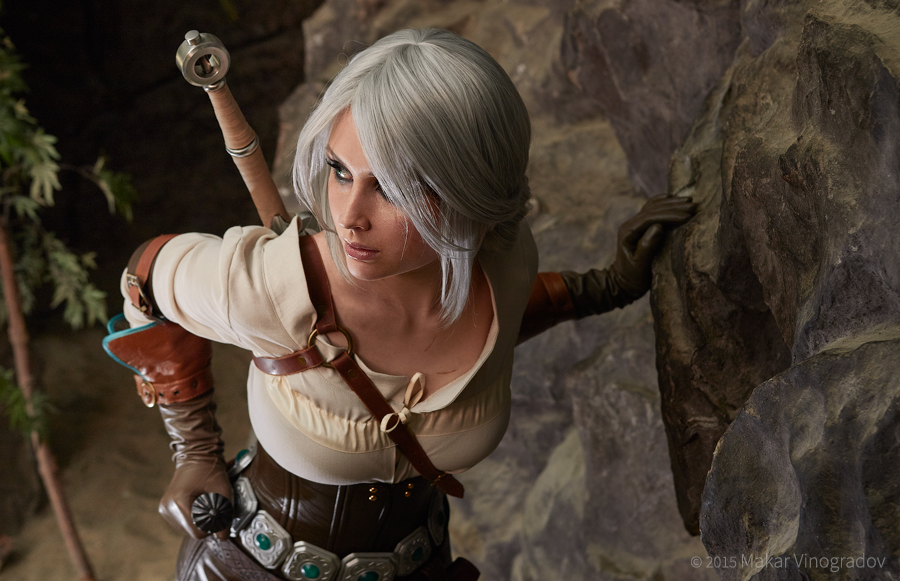
- First appearance: Sword of Destiny; (1992)
- Created by: Andrzej Sapkowski
- Portrayed by: Marta Bitner (The Hexer); Freya Allan (The Witcher)
- Voiced by: Jo Wyatt (The Witcher 3: Wild Hunt); Ciara Berkeley (The Witcher IV)

In-universe information
- Occupation: Witcher

Cirilla Fiona Elen Riannon, also known as the Lion Cub of Cintra, is a fictional character who is one of the central figures in The Witcher series of novels by the Polish author Andrzej Sapkowski. She was introduced in the titular short story of the 1992 collection Sword of Destiny.

Ciri is also a main character in CD Projekt Red's series of video games based on The Witcher, first appearing in The Witcher 3: Wild Hunt (2015). She is set to be the protagonist and playable character in its upcoming sequel, The Witcher IV. In television adaptations, she was portrayed by Marta Bitner in the 2002 Polish television series The Hexer, and has been portrayed by Freya Allan in the American television series The Witcher since 2019.

== Fictional biography ==
Ciri's father, Emhyr var Emreis, was the heir to the throne of Nilfgaard, one of the kingdoms in the novel series, while her mother Pavetta was a princess of Cintra. Before her birth, she was adopted by Geralt of Rivia, a monster hunter with supernatural abilities known as a "witcher", to whom she is tied by destiny. In the novels, the TV series, and The Witcher 2: Assassins of Kings (2011), Emhyr originally searches for Ciri in order to secure his power in Cintra, but eventually replaces her with a lookalike "false Ciri". In The Witcher 3: Wild Hunt, false Ciri has vanished and the story follows Geralt and Emhyr (now emperor of Nifgaard) in their search for the real Ciri. In the books as well as in the Netflix adaptation, she is portrayed as bisexual.
