= The Witcher (Dark Horse Comics) =

Comic book series

Publication information
- Publisher: Dark Horse Comics
- Original language: English
- Genre: Fantasy
- Publication date: 2014

The Witcher is a comic book series that has been published by the American publisher Dark Horse Comics since 2014. It is based on The Witcher media franchise of CD Projekt.

The stories presented in the series were initially mostly originals. They were not written by Andrzej Sapkowski, but by other writers; the exception being volume 2, Fox Children, which adapts a story from the anthology Season of Storms. The first issue debuted in 2014, with story by Paul Tobin. Although Dark Horse Comics is an American publisher, a significant proportion of artists involved in the project have been Polish. In particular, volume 4 (Of Flesh and Flame) was both written and illustrated solely by Polish artists.

It is the second The Witcher comic book series, following the Polish series of the same name published in 1993–1995.

== Reception ==
In 2014, Jesse Schedeen reviewed issue 1 of the first volume (House of Glass) for IGN, noting that while the story "doesn't stand out as being remarkably different from other violent fantasy comics, it's definitely an enjoyable read that requires no familiarity with the source material".

In 2015, Charlie Hall reviewed the issue 1 of the second volume (Fox Children) for Polygon, writing that the series has the potential to explore "moral ambiguity" which the franchise is known for. Torin Chambers at Bloody Disgusting! wrote that the issue is worth recommending, although it would have benefited from an explanatory page for those less familiar with the universe. Likewise, Joie Martin at the Geek Initiative agreed that given the interesting cliffhanger, those who read the first issue will likely want to pick up the next one.

In 2017, Donna-Lyn Washington in her review of volume 3 (Curse of Crows) for the Review Fix concluded that the book is a good story "told in a way that wants you to seek out everything related to this character". The issue was also reviewed that year by Dana Folkard for Impulse Gamer, who called it "an engaging and exciting read". Jason Segarra at AIPT was less impressed, describing it as "a fine story, just not a great one", and noting that it feels like a forgettable sidequest.

In 2018, Ricardo Serrano Denis reviewed the first issue of volume 4 (Of Flesh and Flame) for The Beat. He praised the comic for "one of the truest and most genuine game to comic transitions in recent memory", although he noted that the comic is perhaps less accessible to casual readers than the previous three volumes, and seems to aim more at fans of the series already familiar with the franchise. The issue was also positively reviewed by Patrick Hellen at AIPT, who noted that "this is a great start to a new limited series". On the other hand, Tomasz Gardziński writing for Polish magazine Spider's Web was much more critical, calling it disappointing both when it comes to art and plot.

In 2019, Jody Macgregor reviewing The Witcher comics for PC Gamer, wrote that "Andrzej Sapkowski's books survived being adapted for games and for TV and they make for pretty decent comic books as well". He also ranked the released comics (both from Dark Horse as well as those published by CD Projekt independently); for the Dark Horse works available in time of writing he ranked them worst to best as: House of Glass (volume 1), Of Flesh and Flame (volume 4), Fox Children (volume 2) and, best, Curse of Crows (volume 3). A year later, Nick Smith reviewing the Omnibus Edition Volume One, which collects the first three volumes as well as a short story previously published by CD Projekt, gave it 4 out 5 stars, noting that the fans of The Witcher universe "will really enjoy the book", but that it also "stands on it own" for the casual readers.

In 2020, Matthew Aguilar in a capsule review for Comics called the first issue of volume 5 (Fading Memories) "another excellent addition to the franchise" giving it a score of 5 out of 5. Calum Petrie writing for Flickering Myth gave the issue a score of 9 out of 10, concluding that "this is one of the strongest first issues I have come across". The issue was also praised by Jonathan Brown at Monkeys Fighting Robots who noted that all readers, both fans of The Witcher universe as well as those new to the universe, "will adore this comic". Tomasz Gardziński writing for Polish magazine Spider's Web called the volume an interesting experiment, a psychological thriller worth reading at least once, praising the author for ambition in taking the story in interesting and novel directions, but criticizing the story for a number of plot holes and characters, for acting irrationally. The volume was also reviewed by Bartłomiej Romanek for Polish newspaper Dziennik Zachodni; Romanek positively reviewed the artwork and the story, but also noted that the book is "heavy" and quite different from most prior works in The Witcher universe, focusing on psychology more than on slaying fantasy monsters, and therefore it may disappoint some fans which expected something similar to what they are familiar with and focused on action instead of introspection.

In 2021, Mark Scott at Big Comic Page reviewed the first issue of volume 6 (Witch's Lament) as average, praising the story but criticizing the inconsistent quality of artwork, giving the issue 3/5 score. Later that year, Marcin Zwierzchowski, discussing the series in the Polish daily Gazeta Wyborcza, noted that it presents a solid level, but plot-wise, does not equal that of Sapkowski's originals until volumes 5 and 6 (Fading Memories and Witch's Lament) written by Bartosz Sztybor. Zwierzchowski praised Sztybor's plots for not repeating old motives, like those of Tobin's or Motyka's, but by bravely – and according to the reviewer, successfully – going into uncharted territories. On the other hand, Cian Maher, reviewing Witch's Lament for TheGamer, criticized the book for changing Geralt of Rivia's character too far.

== Publications ==
=== Issues ===
Story arc	Issue	Release date	Story	Art	Colors	Cover
House of Glass	#1	19 March 2014	Paul Tobin	Joe Querio	Carlos Badilla	Dan Panosian & Dave Johnson
House of Glass	#2	23 April 2014	Paul Tobin	Joe Querio	Carlos Badilla	Joe Querio
House of Glass	#3	21 May 2014	Paul Tobin	Joe Querio	Carlos Badilla	Joe Querio
House of Glass	#4	18 June 2014	Paul Tobin	Joe Querio	Carlos Badilla	Joe Querio
House of Glass	#5	16 July 2014	Paul Tobin	Joe Querio	Carlos Badilla	Joe Querio
Fox Children	#1	1 April 2015	Paul Tobin	Joe Querio	Carlos Badilla	Joe Querio
Fox Children	#2	6 May 2015	Paul Tobin	Joe Querio	Carlos Badilla	Joe Querio
Fox Children	#3	3 June 2015	Paul Tobin	Joe Querio	Carlos Badilla	Joe Querio
Fox Children	#4	1 July 2015	Paul Tobin	Joe Querio	Carlos Badilla	Joe Querio
Fox Children	#5	5 August 2015	Paul Tobin	Joe Querio	Carlos Badilla	Joe Querio
Killing Monsters (hardcover) (only digital)		19 May 2015	Paul Tobin	Max Bertolini	Carlos Badilla	Joe Querio
Curse of Crows	#1	31 August 2016	STORY: Paul Tobin with Borys Pugacz-Muraszkiewicz & Karolina Stachyra; DIALOGUE: Travis Currit	Piotr Kowalski	Brad Simpson	Grzesiek Przybyś
Curse of Crows	#2	5 October 2016	STORY: Paul Tobin with Borys Pugacz-Muraszkiewicz & Karolina Stachyra; DIALOGUE: Travis Currit	Piotr Kowalski	Brad Simpson	Grzesiek Przybyś
Curse of Crows	#3	2 November 2016	STORY: Paul Tobin with Borys Pugacz-Muraszkiewicz & Karolina Stachyra; DIALOGUE: Travis Currit	Piotr Kowalski	Brad Simpson	Grzesiek Przybyś
Curse of Crows	#4	7 December 2016	STORY: Paul Tobin with Borys Pugacz-Muraszkiewicz & Karolina Stachyra; DIALOGUE: Travis Currit	Piotr Kowalski	Brad Simpson	Grzesiek Przybyś
Curse of Crows	#5	22 March 2017	STORY: Paul Tobin with Borys Pugacz-Muraszkiewicz & Karolina Stachyra; DIALOGUE: Travis Currit	Piotr Kowalski	Brad Simpson	Grzesiek Przybyś
Of Flesh and Flame	#1	19 December 2018	Aleksandra Motyka	Marianna Strychowska		
Of Flesh and Flame	#2	23 January 2019	Aleksandra Motyka	Marianna Strychowska		
Of Flesh and Flame	#3	20 February 2019	Aleksandra Motyka	Marianna Strychowska		
Of Flesh and Flame	#4	3 April 2019	Aleksandra Motyka	Marianna Strychowska		
Fading Memories	#1	25 November 2020	Bartosz Sztybor	Amad Mir	Hamidreza Sheykh	Evan Cagle; Jeremy Wilson (variants)
Fading Memories	#2	30 December 2020	Bartosz Sztybor	Amad Mir	Hamidreza Sheykh	Evan Cagle; Jeremy Wilson (variants)
Fading Memories	#3	27 January 2021	Bartosz Sztybor	Amad Mir	Hamidreza Sheykh	Evan Cagle; Jeremy Wilson (variants)
Fading Memories	#4	31 March 2021	Bartosz Sztybor	Amad Mir	Hamidreza Sheykh	Evan Cagle; Jeremy Wilson (variants)
Witch's Lament	#1	26 May 2021	Bartosz Sztybor	Vanesa del Rey	Jordie Bellaire	Vanesa del Rey; Anato Finnstark (variants); Stefan Koidl (variants)
Witch's Lament	#2	30 June 2021	Bartosz Sztybor	Vanesa del Rey	Jordie Bellaire	Vanesa del Rey; Anato Finnstark (variants); Stefan Koidl (variants)
Witch's Lament	#3	28 July 2021	Bartosz Sztybor	Vanesa del Rey	Jordie Bellaire	Vanesa del Rey; Anato Finnstark (variants); Stefan Koidl (variants)
Witch's Lament	#4	25 August 2021	Bartosz Sztybor	Vanesa del Rey	Jordie Bellaire	Vanesa del Rey; Anato Finnstark (variants); Stefan Koidl (variants)
A Grain of Truth (hardcover)		27 April 2022	Jacek Rembiś; Travis Currit	Jonas Scharf	José Villarrubia	Kai Carpenter
The Ballad of Two Wolves	#1	21 December 2022	Bartosz Sztybor	Miki Montlló Oriol Pérez	Miki Montlló Helena Rossetti	Jakub Rebelka
The Ballad of Two Wolves	#2	25 January 2023	Bartosz Sztybor	Miki Montlló Oriol Pérez	Miki Montlló Helena Rossetti	Jakub Rebelka
The Ballad of Two Wolves	#3	22 February 2023	Bartosz Sztybor	Miki Montlló Oriol Pérez	Miki Montlló Helena Rossetti	Jakub Rebelka
The Ballad of Two Wolves	#4	6 April 2023	Bartosz Sztybor	Miki Montlló Oriol Pérez	Miki Montlló Helena Rossetti	Jakub Rebelka
Wild Animals	#1	20 September 2022	Bartosz Sztybor	Nataliia Rerekina	Patricio Delpeche Agustina Vallejo	Sara Kipin; Matt Smith; Manuele Fior
Wild Animals	#2	25 October 2023	Bartosz Sztybor	Nataliia Rerekina	Patricio Delpeche Agustina Vallejo	Sara Kipin; Matt Smith; Manuele Fior
Wild Animals	#3	13 December 2023	Bartosz Sztybor	Nataliia Rerekina	Patricio Delpeche Agustina Vallejo	Sara Kipin; Matt Smith; Manuele Fior
Wild Animals	#4	14 February 2024	Bartosz Sztybor	Nataliia Rerekina	Patricio Delpeche Agustina Vallejo	Sara Kipin; Matt Smith; Manuele Fior
The Lesser Evil (hardcover)		22 December 2023	Jacek Rembiś	Adam Gorham	Patricio Delpeche	Kai Carpenter
Corvo Bianco	#1	8 May 2024	Bartosz Sztybor	Corrado Mastantuono	Matteo Vattani	Tonci Zonjic; Neyef Jorge Molin; Corrado Mastantuono
Corvo Bianco	#2	12 June 2024	Bartosz Sztybor	Corrado Mastantuono	Matteo Vattani	Tonci Zonjic; Neyef Jorge Molin; Corrado Mastantuono
Corvo Bianco	#3	17 July 2024	Bartosz Sztybor	Corrado Mastantuono	Matteo Vattani	Tonci Zonjic; Neyef Jorge Molin; Corrado Mastantuono
Corvo Bianco	#4	11 September 2024	Bartosz Sztybor	Corrado Mastantuono	Matteo Vattani	Tonci Zonjic; Neyef Jorge Molin; Corrado Mastantuono
Corvo Bianco	#5	6 November 2024	Bartosz Sztybor	Corrado Mastantuono	Matteo Vattani	Tonci Zonjic; Neyef Jorge Molin; Corrado Mastantuono
The Edge of the World (hardcover)		21 January 2025	Magdalena Salik	Tommaso Bennato	Chris O'Halloran	Kai Carpenter
The Bear and the Butterfly	#1	23 April 2025	Simon Spurrier	Stephen Green	José Villarrubia	Stephen Green
The Bear and the Butterfly	#2	25 June 2025	Simon Spurrier	Stephen Green	José Villarrubia	Stephen Green
The Bear and the Butterfly	#3	3 September 2025	Simon Spurrier	Stephen Green	José Villarrubia	Stephen Green
The Bear and the Butterfly	#4	22 October 2025	Simon Spurrier	Stephen Green	José Villarrubia	Stephen Green
A Question of Price (hardcover)		29 July 2025	Marta Krajewska	Matteo Bellisario	Igor Monti	Kai Carpenter
The Witcher (hardcover)		16 December 2025	Aleksandra Zielinska	Michael Dowling	Luis NCT	Kai Carpenter
Blood Stone	#1	28 January 2026	Daniel Freedman	Pius Bak	Roman Titov	Pius Bak Gigi Cavenago (variants) Patrycja Podkoscielny (variants) Axel Sauerwald (variants)
Blood Stone	#2	11 March 2026	Daniel Freedman	Pius Bak	Roman Titov	Pius Bak Gigi Cavenago (variants) Patrycja Podkoscielny (variants) Axel Sauerwald (variants)
Blood Stone	#3	15 April 2026	Daniel Freedman	Pius Bak	Roman Titov	Pius Bak Gigi Cavenago (variants) Patrycja Podkoscielny (variants) Axel Sauerwald (variants)
Blood Stone	#4	13 May 2026	Daniel Freedman	Pius Bak	Roman Titov	Pius Bak Gigi Cavenago (variants) Patrycja Podkoscielny (variants) Axel Sauerwald (variants)
The Last Wish (hardcover)		11 August 2026	Marcin Zwierzchowski	Guillermo Fajardo	Neeraj Menon	Kai Carpenter

=== Collections ===
Title	Release date	Collects	Cover	ISBN
The Witcher – Volume 1: House of Glass	24 September 2014	The Witcher: House of Glass #1–5	Mike Mignola	9781616554743
The Witcher – Volume 2: Fox Children	16 December 2015	The Witcher: Fox Children #1–5	Julián Totino Tedesco	9781616557935
The Witcher – Volume 3: Curse of Crows	21 June 2017	The Witcher: Curse of Crows #1–5	Grzesiek Przybyś	9781506701615
The Witcher – Library Edition Volume One (hardcover)	31 October 2018	The Witcher: House of Glass #1–5; The Witcher: Fox Children #1–5; The Witcher: Killing Monsters; The Witcher: Curse of Crows #1–5	Mike Mignola	9781506706825
The Witcher – Omnibus Edition Volume One (trade paperback)	20 November 2019	The Witcher: House of Glass #1–5; The Witcher: Fox Children #1–5; The Witcher: Killing Monsters; The Witcher: Curse of Crows #1–5	Mike Mignola	9781506713946
The Witcher – Volume 4: Of Flesh and Flame	17 July 2019	The Witcher: Of Flesh and Flame #1–4	Marianna Strychowska	9781506711096
The Witcher – Volume 5: Fading Memories	28 July 2021	The Witcher: Fading Memories #1–4	Evan Cagle	9781506716572
The Witcher – Volume 6: Witch's Lament	24 November 2021	The Witcher: Witch's Lament #1–4	Vanesa del Rey	9781506722238
The Witcher – Library Edition Volume Two (hardcover)	14 September 2022	The Witcher: Of Flesh and Flame #1–4; The Witcher: Fading Memories #1–4; The Witcher: Witch's Lament #1–4; The Witcher: Once Upon a Time in the Woods	Evan Cagle	9781506726915
The Witcher – Omnibus Edition Volume Two (trade paperback)	4 October 2023	The Witcher: Of Flesh and Flame #1–4; The Witcher: Fading Memories #1–4; The Witcher: Witch's Lament #1–4; The Witcher: Once Upon a Time in the Woods	Evan Cagle	9781506726922
The Witcher – Volume 7: The Ballad of Two Wolves	20 September 2023	The Witcher: The Ballad of Two Wolves #1–4	Miki Montllò	9781506726946
The Witcher – Volume 8: Wild Animals	24 July 2024	The Witcher: Wild Animals #1–4	Matt Smith	9781506727028
The Witcher – Volume 9: Corvo Bianco	25 March 2025	The Witcher: Corvo Bianco #1–5	Corrado Mastantuono	9781506727035
The Witcher – Library Edition Volume Three (hardcover)	26 August 2025	The Witcher: The Ballad of Two Wolves #1–4; The Witcher: Wild Animals #1–4; The Witcher: Corvo Bianco #1–5; The Witcher: Frog Kiss	Corrado Mastantuono	9781506726939
The Witcher – Omnibus Volume 3 (trade paperback)	24 March 2026	The Witcher: The Ballad of Two Wolves #1–4; The Witcher: Wild Animals #1–4; The Witcher: Corvo Bianco #1–5; The Witcher: Frog Kiss	Corrado Mastantuono	9781506728094
The Witcher – Volume 10: The Bear and the Butterfly (hardcover)	31 March 2026	The Witcher: The Bear and the Butterfly #1–4	Stephen Green	9781506727042
The Witcher – Volume 11: Blood Stone (trade paperback)	27 October 2026	The Witcher: Blood Stone #1-4	Daniel Freedman	9781506727066
