= Sword of Destiny =

Short story collection by Andrzej Sapkowski

- First edition cover
- Author: Andrzej Sapkowski
- Original title: Miecz przeznaczenia
- Translator: David French
- Language: Polish
- Series: The Witcher
- Release number: 2
- Genre: Fantasy
- Publisher: 1992 (superNOWA) (Polish); 2015 (Gollancz) (English)
- Publication date: 1992
- Publication place: Poland
- English publication date: 2015
- Media type: Print (paperback)
- Pages: 384
- ISBN: 978-1-4732-1153-7
- Preceded by: The Last Wish
- Followed by: Blood of Elves

Sword of Destiny (Polish: Miecz przeznaczenia) is the second (Note: It was preceded by The Witcher, published in 1990 by Reporter. Additionally, despite their publication dates, SuperNowa considers 1992's Sword of Destiny to be the second book in their official order, and 1993's The Last Wish to be the first.) published short story collection and fix-up novel in Polish fantasy writer Andrzej Sapkowski's The Witcher series. Although published in 1992, it is officially considered the second entry in the series, behind The Last Wish, which was published the following year. Sword of Destiny was first published in English in the UK by Gollancz in 2015.

The anthology consists of six stories, loosely linked in chronology. They introduce characters that become major players in the later novels, which began with 1994's Blood of Elves and are known as The Witcher Saga. The titular story, "The Sword of Destiny", introduces the character of Ciri. The following story, "Something More", is a direct prequel to the novels.

== Plot ==
=== "The Bounds of Reason" ===
Granica możliwości

Geralt of Rivia meets the traveling knight Borch "Three Jackdaws" and his Zerrikanian bodyguards Tea and Vea, who seek a green dragon. Although Geralt is a Witcher, a professional monster slayer, he explains that he does not kill dragons, because they do not prey on humans. They join a larger party hunting the dragon, including Geralt's friend Dandelion; a group of dwarves led by Yarpen Zigrin; a mercenary group known as the Crinfrid Reavers led by Boholt; chivalry-obsessed paladin Eyck of Denesle; a company of men-at-arms led by the underaged King Niedamir; and the sorcerers Dorregaray and Geralt's ex-lover Yennefer.

The party eventually encounters a golden dragon, Villentretenmerth, who offers a fair battle to anyone who wishes to challenge him. Eyck of Denesle accepts and is defeated, which weakens the party's resolve and causes King Niedamir's cadre to leave.

Boholt's Reavers and the dwarves elect to attack the dragon together and split the treasure. Geralt, Dorregaray, and Dandelion disagree, for which they are paralyzed by Yennefer and tied to a cart. Yennefer attempts to disable the dwarves and Reavers so she can kill the dragon herself, as its viscera will supposedly cure her infertility, but is disabled instead. Villentretenmerth, bored with waiting, enters the struggle and dispatches the Reavers and dwarves. He leaves a fledgling green dragon with the remaining party members and attacks an oncoming militia from a nearby village. Tea and Vea appear and assist the golden dragon, revealing that Borch was actually Villentretenmerth in human form.

Reassuming his human form, Villentretenmerth explains that the green dragon, Myrgtabrakke, called him for assistance and left him her "treasure" (her hatchling) as payment. Geralt asks Villentretenmerth why he chooses a human disguise. Villentretenmerth admits that, unlike the rest of dragonkind, he likes humans. He says that Yennefer's infertility is irreversible, but she refuses to give up on finding a cure. Villentretenmerth returns to his dragon form and flies away.

=== "A Shard of Ice" ===
Okruch lodu

Geralt hunts and kills a zeugl living in a garbage heap outside of Aedd Gynvael. He returns to Yennefer at their inn and complains that the town's atmosphere is making him confused and short-tempered. Yennefer insists that they stay because she likes the town and its history, and because she is visiting her sorcerer friend Istredd. The two make love.

The next morning, Geralt meets the pompous warrior Ivo Mirce (a.k.a. "Cicada") who works for the alderman Herbolth, who pays Geralt his fee for killing the zeugl but subtracts a small tax. Herbolth also mentions that Yennefer has been in Aedd Gynvael many times before to visit Istredd. As Geralt leaves, Cicada harasses him.

Geralt meets with Istredd, who confides that he loves Yennefer and proposed marriage to her, but she asked for time to think about it. Istredd believes that Geralt's presence makes her decision difficult, and wishes for Geralt to leave and never see her again. Istredd insists that he's a better mate for her than Geralt, as witchers do not actually feel emotions. Geralt insists that Yennefer loves him, as she slept with him the night before. Istredd smugly replies that she slept with him that morning.

Yennefer returns home that night, and she and Geralt discuss their natures. Yennefer creates a black kestrel with her magic and asks it what the truth is, and it replies that "the truth is a shard of ice." The next day, Geralt and Istredd agree to duel for Yennefer's hand. Herbolth intervenes and says the town needs Istredd's services, and Geralt is not allowed to kill him. Tired and affected by the recent events, Geralt walks into a dark alley without his weapons and is attacked by two thieves, who leave him after realizing he is a witcher. One thief tells him to not involve others if he wishes to commit suicide. That evening, he receives a message from Yennefer.

The next morning, Geralt beats Cicada and his men before meeting Istredd, who has received a note from Yennefer, wishing him farewell. Istredd does not accept this and still wishes to fight Geralt. Geralt repeats the thieves' words to him and leaves.

=== "Eternal Flame" ===
Wieczny ogień

Geralt meets Dandelion in the capital metropolis of Novigrad after the latter is kicked out by his enraged lover Vespula. The pair head to a nearby inn where Dandelion asks his friend, the halfling merchant Dainty Biberveldt, to pay his outstanding tab and buy them dinner. Dainty is afraid of Geralt and the trio makes small talk before they are interrupted by another beaten Dainty. The Dainty whom Geralt and Dandelion were talking to is a mimic—also known as a vexling, or a doppler—a creature that can transform into and mimic others.

The doppler introduces himself as Tellico Lunngrevink Letorte, nicknamed "Dudu". Dudu attacked Dainty outside of Novigrad, stole his horses and caravan, and sold them to buy seemingly worthless goods in Dainty's name, leaving Dainty destitute and sullying his reputation. Geralt refuses to kill Dudu because he is an intelligent being. Dudu escapes and Dainty is ordered by Schwann, a city official, to pay a tax on Dudu's profits, which Dainty cannot afford.

The trio are accosted by Chappelle, royal minister of security affairs and head of the city's secret police. Chappelle tells them that stories of a doppler in the city must stop spreading, as the city is protected by the Eternal Fire, which promises protection from monsters and similar threats. Muskrat, the merchant guild's treasurer, arrives and tells Dainty that the 'useless' goods bought by Dudu have sold for massive profits, due to recent political events.

Vimme Vivaldi, a banker friend of Dainty's, has made Dudu's transactions thus far. He explains that Dudu's worthless purchases were a cover for legitimate ones, that have resold for exorbitant prices. Due to Dudu's successes, Dainty has recovered his fortune and reputation, with the taxes paid in full. However, Dudu is still at large, making "random" purchases and sales with Dainty's face.

Geralt, Dandelion, and Dainty find Dudu and give chase. Dudu transforms into Geralt to fight him, but is too good-natured and loses. Dudu explains that he merely wishes to assimilate and survive in the city. He transforms into Dandelion and heads into the market, where he is beaten by a still-angry Vespula. Geralt captures Dudu, but is stopped by Chappelle, who reveals that he is also a doppler, taking a recently deceased Chappelle's form. Dainty, Dudu, and Chappelle agree that Dudu can live in the city under the alias of Dainty's cousin, Dudu Biberveldt, and work as his proxy in Novigrad. Dudu reveals that his "random" purchases will be used for more Eternal Fire altars, making another fortune.

=== "A Little Sacrifice" ===
Trochę poświęcenia

Geralt acts as translator to help Duke Agloval propose to his lover, the mermaid Sh'eenaz. The proposal is unsuccessful because neither party agrees to transform themselves to live with the other, and Agloval refuses to pay Geralt. He meets up with Dandelion and his close friend Essi Daven, a female minstrel known as "Little Eye". Agloval arrives with a job for Geralt. A pearl-diving boat was found floating alone in the ocean, with the crew vanished and blood splatters on the deck, presumably the work of a sea monster. After accepting the job, Geralt and Essi share a kiss, which neither can explain.

The next day, Geralt begins his hunt, and Essi joins him. Geralt fails to find anyone willing to take him to the fishing boat's location. Sh'eenaz warns Geralt away from the site. Essi's nautical knowledge, however, allows Geralt to reach the site, which he does with Dandelion. The two find stairs leading into the water, which Dandelion theorizes leads to the sunken city of Ys. The pair are attacked by undersea creatures. Geralt is dragged underwater as he and Dandelion escape, but is saved by Sh'eenaz, who again warns him away. While dressing his wounds, Essi admits her love for Geralt. However, Geralt feels nothing for her, due to his love for Yennefer. He allows Essi to spend the evening with him, and gives her a pearl found on the stairs to Ys, which Essi swears to keep.

Geralt tells Agloval of the undersea race, but refuses to kill them, as they are intelligent. Agloval decides to go to war with the creatures, despite Geralt and Essi's pleas against it. However, Sh'eenaz arrives, having become human, so that she may marry Agloval and live with him. Geralt, Dandelion, and Essi leave and travel together, with Geralt and Essi eventually ending their affair. Dandelion composes a ballad the night before they part ways, about a witcher and a bard falling in love, but never performs it. Geralt and Essi never see each other again, and Essi dies in a smallpox epidemic a few years later, with Dandelion burying her with her lute and the pearl Geralt gave her.

=== "Sword of Destiny" ===
Miecz przeznaczenia

Geralt heads to Brokilon, the Last Forest, to deliver a message to the queen of the dryads, Eithne, from King Venzlav. He finds bodies left by the dryads, along with one survivor, his friend Freixenet, alive but wounded. Dryads accost Geralt and the dryad Braenn agrees to take him to Eithne. Geralt and Braenn encounter and kill a giant centipede threatening a girl named Ciri, who joins them. Ciri likes Geralt, and explains that she is a princess and was going to be married off to Prince Kistrin, son of King Ervyll, but ran away.

Braenn, Geralt, and Ciri arrive in Duen Canell, the heart of Brokilon. Freixenet's wounds have been treated, as the dryads intend for him to impregnate some of them. Ciri realizes that the dryads plan to keep her—the dryads bolster their numbers by taking and brainwashing young girls into their culture, as they had done to Braenn. Geralt meets Eithne and the two discuss destiny, which Eithne believes is a "doubled-edged sword".

Eithne allows Ciri to choose whether she wants to stay in the forest or leave with Geralt. She makes Ciri drink the water of Brokilon, which removes memories of a former life, but it doesn't affect Ciri. At the same time, drinking the water causes Geralt to realize that Ciri is "Cirilla, daughter of Pavetta and granddaughter to Queen Calanthe of Cintra, and Geralt's promised 'Child of Destiny' as per the Law of Surprise (which he enacted in "A Question of Price").

Ciri and Geralt awaken at the edge of Brokilon, released by Eithne. The two move towards Brugge to tell King Venzlav that Eithne refuses to concede land to him. They encounter Verden mercenaries, sent by King Ervyll, who have murdered a group of merchants and plan to use the incident to provoke war with the dryads. Geralt fights them while Ciri hides, and is helped by dryads and the druid Mousesack, who has been sent to bring Ciri to Cintra. As they journey to Cintra, Mousesack confides that Calanthe has canceled Ciri's arranged marriage to Kistrin, and Ervyll's dishonorable actions will reinforce her decision. Ciri and Mousesack urge Geralt to take Ciri with him, as expected under the Law of Surprise, but Geralt declines, and attempts to leave while Ciri is sleeping. Ciri wakes up and calls to Geralt, insisting that she is his destiny, but he walks away.

=== "Something More" ===
Coś więcej

Geralt saves the merchant Yurga from monsters that had toppled Yurga's cart, after exacting the Law of Surprise from him. Geralt defeats the monsters but is severely wounded. Yurga puts him in his cart and gives Geralt one of his healing potions, which knocks Geralt unconscious and causes him to dream of memories.

In the first, Geralt spends Beltane with Yennefer, who says that they can't stay together, which he accepts. In the next, Geralt visits Cintra six years after his visit in 'A Question of Price'. He notices children playing in the moat of the castle. Calanthe allows him to guess which child is Pavetta's, who died with Duny in a shipwreck, and take it, but will not tell him if he is correct. She has learned of the risks involved in training a child to become a witcher and is afraid of what will happen to her grandchild if taken. Geralt however had no intentions to call in his promise, wanting to look into the face of destiny and understand. Geralt explains that he was abandoned by his sorceress mother, not claimed by the witcher's Law of Surprise, and still doesn't believe in destiny. Believing Pavetta had a son, he claims the son isn't playing in the moat and leaves.

Geralt awakes and finds his mother Visenna healing him. Geralt wishes to look at her and know if destiny has led them back to each other, but Visenna refuses, saying that it won't change anything. The next day, Yurga tells Geralt about the battle of Sodden that drove back the Nilfgaardian forces, but killed fourteen sorcerers who fought there. There is a monument listing the dead sorcerers' names. Geralt goes there and remembers encounters with the sorcerers listed, before meeting Death in the form of a young woman. She reads him the last name on the monument, Yennefer of Vengerberg. Heartbroken, Geralt asks Death to take him but she refuses. Yurga later tells Geralt that he knows the names, and the last is not Yennefer. Geralt rescinds his Law of Surprise after Yurga offers one of his sons for witcher training.

Geralt recalls meeting Dandelion soon after Nilfgaard began marching across the continent. Geralt saves Dandelion and promises to help him cross the river after he goes to Cintra. Dandelion tells him that Cintra has fallen, with Calanthe throwing herself from the castle walls and all of the nobility committing suicide. Ciri is missing and assumed dead. Despondent, Geralt asks Dandelion if he believes in destiny, and claims that even if two people are destined to be together, there must be "something more" for that destiny to mean anything.

Finally, Geralt and Yurga arrive at the latter's house. Yurga's wife has a surprise: she has taken in a young girl orphaned in the attacks. The child is revealed to be Ciri, who escaped Cintra. Ciri and Geralt embrace and Ciri asks if she is his destiny, to which Geralt responds that she is "something more".

== Production ==
The first collection of Andrzej Sapkowski's short stories was simply titled The Witcher and published by Reporter in 1990. SuperNowa acquired the publishing rights to the series that same year and published Sword of Destiny in 1992 as their first entry. In 1993, they published The Last Wish to replace Reporter's collection as the first book in their official order. Chronologically speaking, the stories in The Last Wish take place before those in Sword of Destiny.

Sword of Destiny was translated into English translation by David French and published in the United Kingdom by Gollancz on May 21, 2015.

== Audiobook ==
In 2011, after the success of the audio play based on Sapkowski's Narrenturm, Fonopolis and audioteka.pl released the audio plays based on The Last Wish and Sword of Destiny. Sword of Destiny, lasting about 15 hours, was voiced by 49 actors, including Krzysztof Banaszyk as Geralt, Anna Dereszowska as Yennefer, Sławomir Pacek as Dandelion, Joanna Pach as Ciri, and Krzysztof Gosztyła as narrator.

== Reception ==
Sword of Destiny won the 2012 Tähtifantasia Award in Finland.

== Adaptations ==
- "The Bounds of Reason" was adapted into a comic book published by Prószyński i S-ka, part of their The Witcher series, and in The Witcher TV series episode "Rare Species" (1st season).
- "The Bounds of Reason" (as "The Dragon") and "A Shard of Ice" were adapted into episodes of The Hexer TV series, while it also used elements of "The Sword of Destiny" (in "Man – First Meeting" and "Jaskier") and "Something More" (in "Crossroads" and "Ciri").
- Elements of "Sword of Destiny" were adapted in The Witcher episode "Of Banquets, Bastards and Burials" (1st season).
- "A Shard of Ice", even though not directly adapted in The Witcher series, introduces Istredd who is one of the key figures in first two seasons of the show. Taken from the story, his first meeting with Geralt which reveals that both were involved with Yennefer is part of the plot line of the "Turn Your Back" episode of the 2nd season.
- While "Eternal Flame" has not been adapted anywhere, many of the characters, locations, and ideas that appear in the story serve as an important inspiration and are continued during the Novigrad section of The Witcher 3: Wild Hunt's main story line. These include the only significant appearance of city of Novigrad itself with its banks, pubs, and markets, as well as the idea that the city is controlled by the Church of the Eternal Fire. An important game subplot involving the changing treatment of mages and non-humans in Novigrad has its origins here. Four game characters make their only book appearance in this short story - the shape-shifting dopler characters Dudu and Chappelle, the dwarven banker Vimme Vivaldi, and a scorned former girlfriend of Dandelion named Vespula.
- "Something More" was adapted into the two episodes that ended season one of The Witcher: "Before a Fall" and "Much More".
- "A Little Sacrifice" was loosely adapted into an animated film The Witcher: Sirens of the Deep.
