= The Hexer (TV series) =

2002 Polish fantasy television series

- Wiedźmin
- Genre: Fantasy, Action, Drama
- Based on: The Witcher by Andrzej Sapkowski
- Written by: Michał Szczerbic
- Directed by: Marek Brodzki
- Starring: Michał Żebrowski; Zbigniew Zamachowski; Maciej Kozłowski; Grażyna Wolszczak
- Composer: Grzegorz Ciechowski
- Country of origin: Poland
- Original language: Polish
- No. of series: 1
- No. of episodes: 13

Production
- Executive producer: Michał Szczerbic
- Producers: Lew Rywin; Paweł Poppe; Sławomir Rogowski
- Cinematography: Bogdan Stachurski
- Running time: 45-53 minutes
- Production company: Heritage Films

Original release
- Network: Telewizja Polska
- Release: 22 September – 15 December 2002

Related
- The Hexer

Wiedźmin (The Hexer or The Witcher in English) is a Polish fantasy television series that aired in 2002. The story is based on the stories of The Witcher fantasy series (The Last Wish and Sword of Destiny collections), by Polish author Andrzej Sapkowski.

== Plot ==
The Hexer begins with the childhood of Geralt of Rivia (Michał Żebrowski), who is a traveling monster hunter. Vesemir collected the child while invoking the Law of Surprise. The series then follows him train at Kaer Morhen, develop his abilities, and mutate.

== Cast ==
- Michał Żebrowski as Geralt of Rivia
- Grażyna Wolszczak as Yennefer
- Marta Bitner as Ciri of Cintra
- Zbigniew Zamachowski as Jaskier / Dandelion
- Jerzy Nowak as Vesemir
- Wojciech Duryasz as Old Witcher
- Józef Para as Druid of Kaer Morhen
- Dariusz Jakubowski as Duny
- Aleksander Bednarz as Mousesack
- Ewa Wiśniewska as Calanthe
- Agata Buzek as Pavetta
- Olgierd Łukaszewicz as Stregobor
- Kinga Ilgner as Renfri
- Bronisław Wrocławski as Istredd
- Daniel Olbrychski as Filavandrel
- Małgorzata Zasztowt as Téa
- Julita Famulska as Véa
- Maciej Kozłowski as Falwick / Gwidon
- Anna Dymna as Nenneke
- Maria Peszek as Iola
- Jarosław Boberek as Yarpen Zigrin
- Michał Milowicz as Crach an Craite
- Ryszard Kotys as Centurion
- Marian Glinka as Boholt
- Edward Żentara as King Foltest
- Magdalena Górska as Adda the White
- Waldemar Kownacki as Korin
- Wiesław Chmielinski as Nohorn
- Rafał Mohr as Arthur Tailles
- Wladysław Baranski as Nimir
- Mariusz Jakus as Vyr
- Grzegorz Emanuel as Civril
- Janusz Rymkiewicz as Tavik
- Henryk Talar as Eldar de Casteberg
- Dorota Kamińska as Eithné
- Dariusz Biskupski as Ivo "Cykada" Mirce
- Arkadiusz Janiczek as Clovis
- Jarosław Nowikowski as Gascaden
- Mariusz Leszczyński as King Hereward
- Andrzej Hudziak as Baron Herm
- Andrzej Musiał as Haxo
- Jerzy Schejbal as Vissegerd
- Dariusz Siastacz as Bard Drogodar
- Andrzej Bryg as Niszczuka
- Jarosław Gruda as Yurga
- Jerzy Piwowarczyk as Eist Tuirseach
- Angelika Brykczyńska as Zlotolitka
- Rafał Królikowski as King Niedamir
- Tomasz Sapryk as Dermot Marranga
- Andrzej Chyra as Borch Three Jackdaws

== Episodes ==
No.	Polish title	English translation	Source stories
1	"Dzieciństwo"	"Childhood"	–
2	"Nauka"	"Training"	–
3	"Człowiek – pierwsze spotkanie"	"Man – First Meeting"	Incorporates minor elements of "The Lesser Evil" and "The Sword of Destiny"
4	"Smok"	"The Dragon"	"The Bounds of Reason"
5	"Okruch lodu"	"A Shard of Ice"	"A Shard of Ice "
6	"Calanthe"	"Calanthe"	"A Question of Price"
7	"Dolina Kwiatów"	"Dol Blathanna"	"Eternal Flame", "The Edge of the World"
8	"Rozdroże"	"Crossroads"	"The Witcher", "The Voice of Reason", "Something More"
9	"Świątynia Melitele"	"The Temple of Melitele"	"The Voice of Reason"
10	"Mniejsze zło"	"The Lesser Evil"	"The Lesser Evil"
11	"Jaskier"	"Dandelion"	Elements of "The Lesser Evil", "A Shard of Ice " and "The Sword of Destiny"
12	"Falwick"	"Falwick"	–
13	"Ciri"	"Ciri"	Contains elements of "Something More"

== Reception ==
The series has been described as better than the movie which preceded it, but the poor critical and fan reception of the movie, which was described as a glorified, incoherent trailer for the TV show, was cited as one of the reasons for the series cancellation after 13 episodes. Sapkowski has also criticized the television adaptation.
