= Marta Bitner =

Polish retired actress (born 1991)

- Born: 1991 (age 34–35)
- Occupation: Actress
- Years active: 2000–2012

Marta Bitner (Polish: [ˈmar.ta ˈbit.nɛr]; born 1991) is a Polish retired film and television actress. She appeared in films The Condemnation of Franciszek Kłos (2000), and The Hexer (2001), and television series Two Sides of the Coin (2007), Days of Honor (2008), Egzamin z życia (2008), Giraffe and Rhino Hotel (2008), Barwy szczęścia (2009, 2011), Licencja na wychowanie (2010–2011), and Medics (2012).

== Biography ==
Marta Bitner was born in 1991. As a child, she portrayed Wandzia in 2000 television war drama film The Condemnation of Franciszek Kłos, and Ciri of Cintra in 2001 fantasy film The Hexer. Her latter performance was badly reviewed by film critics, leading to her taking a break in her acting career. Later, she appeared in television series Two Sides of the Coin (2007), Days of Honor (2008), Egzamin z życia (2008), Giraffe and Rhino Hotel (2008), Barwy szczęścia (2009, 2011), Licencja na wychowanie (2010–2011), and Medics (2012).

== Filmography ==
=== Films ===
Year	Title	Role	Notes
2000	The Condemnation of Franciszek Kłos	Wandzia	Television film
2000	Moja córeczka	Young Mireczka	Television play
2001	The Hexer	Ciri of Cintra	Feature film

=== Television series ===
Year	Title	Role	Notes
2002	The Hexer	Ciri of Cintra	4 episodes
2007	Two Sides of the Coin	Ania Kowalska	9 episodes
2008	Days of Honor	Jadzia	2 episodes
2008	Egzamin z życia		Episode no. 106
2008	Giraffe and Rhino Hotel	Aleksandra Miłobędzka	13 episodes
2009	Barwy szczęścia	Ada's friend	3 episodes
2011	Barwy szczęścia	Klara's friend	Episode no. 618
2010–2011	Licencja na wychowanie	Wiktoria Leszczyńska	101 episodes
2012	Medics	Dancer	Episode: "Na rozdrożu" (no. 1)
