= Anna Dereszowska =

Polish actress and singer

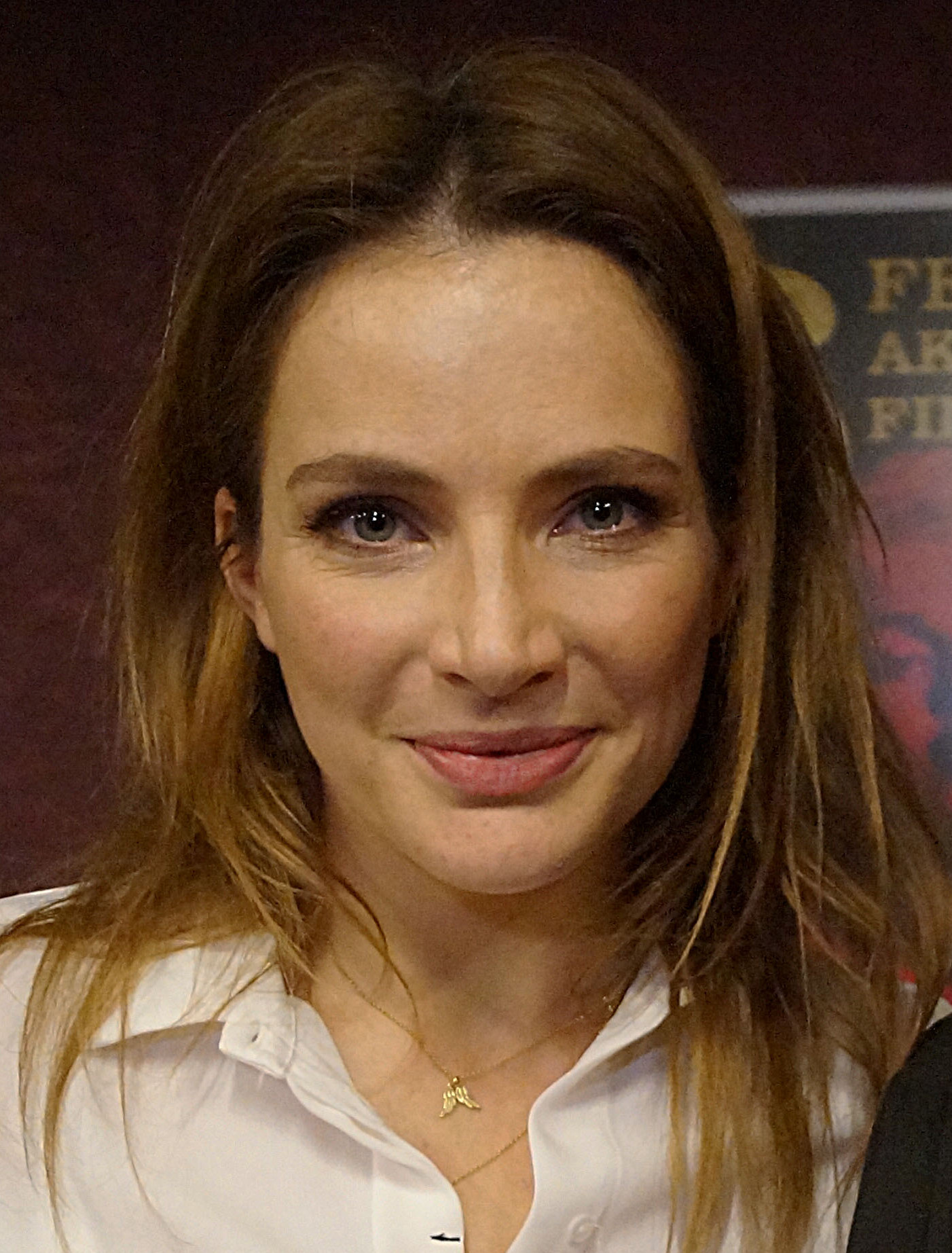
- Born: Anna Dagmara Dereszowska; 7 January 1981 (age 45); Mikołów, Katowice Voivodeship, Polish People's Republic
- Education: The Aleksander Zelwerowicz National Academy of Dramatic Art in Warsaw
- Occupations: Actress, singer
- Years active: 1996–present
- Partner: Piotr Grabowski (born 1972)
- Musical career
- Genres: Pop
- Instrument: Vocals
- Label: EMI Music Poland

Anna Dagmara Dereszowska (born 7 January 1981) is a Polish actress, Voice Actress and singer.

== Biography ==
She is the daughter of Krzysztof Dereszowski and Dagmara Kufieta-Dereszowska (1943–1990). She has an older brother Andrzej and a younger half-sister Julia. In 1999 she graduated from the Private Music School in Mikołów under the auspices of ISME in the piano class. She is also a graduate of the III Liceum Ogólnokształcące im. Adam Mickiewicz in Katowice. In 2003 she graduated from the Theater Academy in Warsaw.

== Personal life ==
From a relationship with actor Piotr Grabowski, she has a daughter, Lena (born in 2008). With photographer Daniel Duniak, she has two sons, Maksymilian (born 2015) and Aleksander (born 2021).

She is involved in social causes, supports the activities of the Foundation "Akogo?" and "Dreams Come True".

She has previously been an advertising ambassador for Philips feminine care and styling products.

== Discography ==
- Już Nie Zapomnisz Mnie (2011)

== Filmography ==
- 2012: Siła wyższa as Siostra Dorota
- 2011: Na dobre i na złe as Magda Soszyńska
- 2011: Miłość w sieci
- 2010: Sprawiedliwi as Ina Paloma
- 2010: Klub szalonych dziewic as Magda Mazurek
- 2010: Randka w ciemno as Kinga
- 2009: Nowa as Karina Sznajder
- 2009: Nigdy nie mów nigdy as Ama Bilska
- 2009: M jak miłość as Sandra Matuszewska
- 2009: Naznaczony as Milena Kral
- 2009: Tylko miłość as Karolina
- 2008: Hardcover as Ewa
- 2008: Lejdis as Korba
- 2007: Odwróceni as Laura
- 2007: Tajemnica twierdzy szyfrów as Anna Maria Solof
- 2007: Świadek koronny as Laura
- 2007: Testosterone
- 2005: Tango z aniołem as Wiktoria Adasiewicz
- 2003: Zróbmy sobie wnuka as Basia
- 2002: Złotopolscy as Kalina Fatalska

== Polish dubbing ==
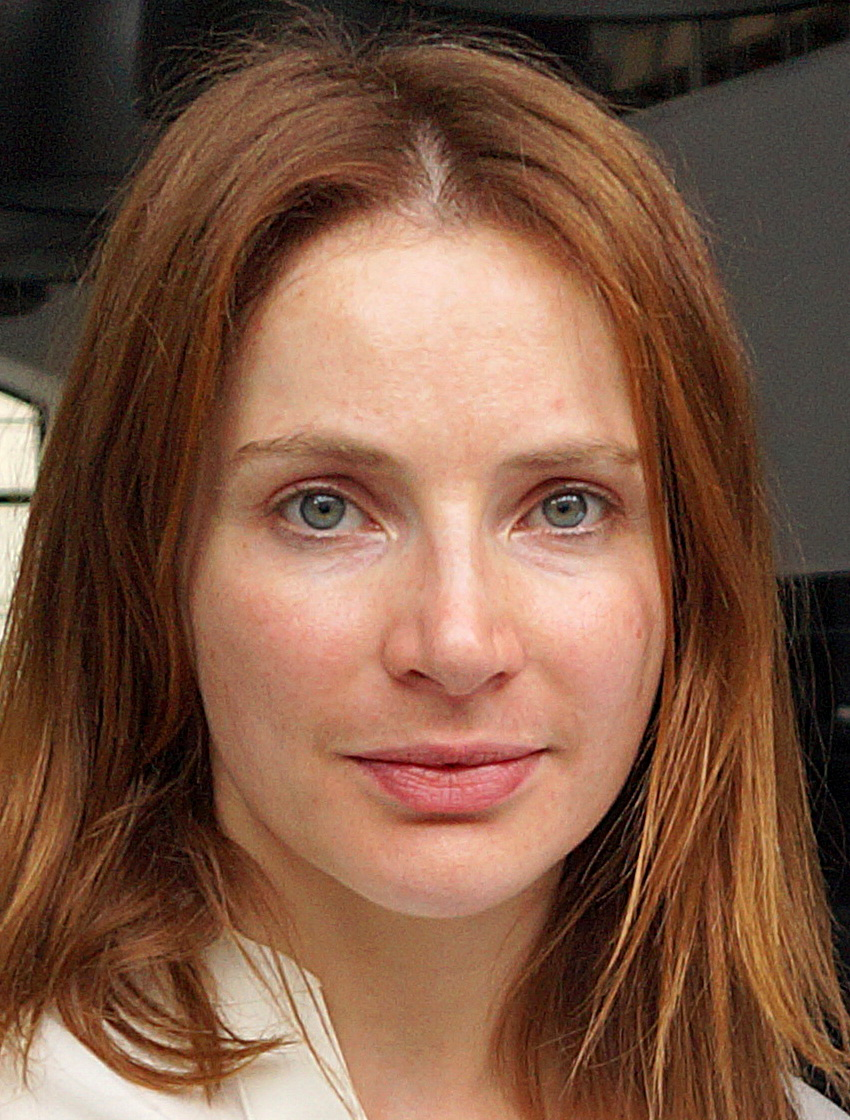
Anna Dereszowska, 2018

- 2017 Syberia 3 – Kate Walker
- 2011: Delfin Plum – manta ray "Oceania"
- 2011: LittleBigPlanet 2 – Eva
- 2011: Beverly Hills Chihuahua 2 (pol. Cziłała z Beverly Hills 2) – Rachel
- 2010: Camp Rock 2 – Connie Torres
- 2010: Cats & Dogs: The Revenge of Kitty Galore (pol. Psy i koty: Odwet Kitty) – Catherine
- 2010: Lilly the Witch: The Dragon and the Magic Book (pol. Czarodziejka Lili: Smok i magiczna księga) – Mother
- 2010: I'm in the Band (pol. Ja w kapeli) – Beth
- 2010: Nanny McPhee and the Big Bang (pol. Niania i wielkie bum) – Ms Green
- 2010: Alice in Wonderland (Alicja w Krainie Czarów)
- 2009: The Flight Before Christmas (pol. Renifer Niko ratuje święta) – Wilma
- 2009: A Christmas Carol (pol. Opowieść wigilijna) – Belle
- 2009: The Courageous Heart of Irena Sendler (pol. Dzieci Ireny Sendlerowej) – Ewa
- 2008: The Garfield Show (pol. Garfield) – Liz
- 2008: Bedtime Stories (pol. Opowieści na dobranoc) − Jill
- 2008: The Suite Life on Deck (pol. Suite Life: Nie ma to jak statek) – Carey Martin
- 2008: Beverly Hills Chihuahua (pol. Cziłała z Beverly Hills) − Rachel
- 2008: Camp Rock − Connie Torres
- 2007: The Last Wish (book) (pol. Ostatnie życzenie)
- 2007: Enchanted (pol. Zaczarowana) − Nancy
- 2007: The Golden Compass (pol. Złoty kompas) − Serafina Pekkala
- 2007: Happily N'Ever After (pol. Happy Wkręt) − Sister
- 2005: The Chronicles of Narnia: The Lion, the Witch and the Wardrobe (pol. Opowieści z Narnii: Lew, Czarownica i stara szafa)
- 2005: The Suite Life of Zack & Cody (Nie ma to jak hotel) – Carey Martin
- 2005: American Dragon Jake Long (pol. Amerykański smok Jake Long) – Rose (season I)
- 2004–2006: Justice League Unlimited (pol. Liga Sprawiedliwych Bez Granic)
- 2012 The Avengers as Maria Hill
