= Independent Publishing House NOWA =

The Independent Publishing House NOWA (Polish: Niezależna Oficyna Wydawnicza NOWA, meaning 'new' or 'nova') was the first underground publishing house in the Polish People's Republic (see samizdat). After opening in 1977, it soon became the largest independent publisher in Communist Poland. In 1989, after the fall of Communism and the change to a democratic political system, the publishing house changed its name to SuperNowa (meaning "supernew" or “supernova”) and became private in 1993. It continues to publish works to this day, including books by Andrzej Sapkowski.

== Beginning ==
In 1977, Students at John Paul II Catholic University of Lublin started an independent publishing house, creating their own magazine, Zapis, and the first two issues were published under that name. The name Nieocenzurowana Oficyna Wydawnicza (NOWA-Uncensored Publishing House) was suggested by Janusz Krupski, Piotr Jegliński and Wit Wójtowicz, and that summer, the Lublin students contacted Mirosław Chojecki, an activist for the Workers' Defense Committee, who agreed regarding the name. Under Chojecki's leadership, NOWA was moved to Warsaw, and in August 1977, its first book was issued, titled Pochodzenie Systemu (The Origin of the System). It was authored by Marek Tarniewski, whose real name was Jakub Karpiński, a sociologist, who had been expelled from Warsaw University in the late 1960s.

== Activity ==
From 1977 until 1989, NOWA published approximately 300 books, consisting of both Polish and foreign literature, as well as modern history. Average circulation ranged from several hundred to several thousand per title. NOWA also printed a number of underground magazines, including "Zapis", "Krytyka", "Puls", and "Tygodnik Mazowsze". It was organized along the lines of a professional publishing house and handled its own printing and distribution. Profits from book sales allowed NOWA to pay royalties to its writers and salaries to its translators, printers, and distributors. In the mid-1980s, NOWA began offering video and audio tapes.

== Selected publications ==
- Czarna księga cenzury PRL (Black Book of Censorship in Communist Poland), 1977,
- Tadeusz Konwicki, Kompleks polski (Polish Complex), 1977,
- Kazimierz Brandys, Nierzeczywistość (Unreality), 1977,
- Czesław Miłosz, Traktat poetycki. Traktat moralny (A treaty of Poetry. Moral Treaty), 1978,
- Bohumil Hrabal, Zbyt głośna samotność (Too Loud a Solitude), 1978,
- Jan Nowak-Jeziorański, Kurier z Warszawy (Courier from Warsaw), 1979,
- Joseph Brodsky, Poems, translated by Stanislaw Baranczak, 1979,
- Günter Grass, The Tin Drum, 1979,
- Witold Gombrowicz Trans-Atlantyk, 1979,
- Jerzy Andrzejewski, Miazga, 1979,
- Venedikt Yerofeyev, Moscow-Petushki, 1979,
- Tadeusz Konwicki Mała apokalipsa (A Minor Apocalypse), 1979,
- Arthur Koestler, Darkness at Noon, 1981,
- Tadeusz Korzeniewski W Polsce (In Poland), 1981,
- Karl Jaspers, The Question of German Guilt, 1982 (first book published during the Martial law in Poland),
- Marek Nowakowski, Raport o stanie wojennym (Report on the Martial Law), 1982,
- Stanisław Rembek, W polu (In the Field), 1982,
- Jan Józef Lipski KOR, 1984,
- Jarosław Marek Rymkiewicz, Rozmowy polskie latem 1983 (Polish Conversations in the Summer of 1983), 1984,
- Kurt Vonnegut, Mother Night, 1984,
- Viktor Suvorov, The Liberators, 1984,
- Yevgeny Zamyatin, We, 1985,
- Hannah Arendt, The Origins of Totalitarianism, 1988.

== Activists ==
In August 1980, NOWA was headed by Konrad Bieliński, Grzegorz Boguta, and Mirosław Chojecki. They were supported by Adam Michnik, Ewa Milewicz, Anatol Lawina, Jan Narożniak, and Ryszard Knauff. Printing and distribution were controlled by Marek Chimiak, Mieczysław Grudziński, and Piotr Szwajcer.

After creation of the Solidarity trade union in August 1980, NOWA was headed by Grzegorz Boguta, Marek Borowik, and Marek Chimiak. In December 1981 (see Martial law in Poland), NOWA was briefly managed by Paweł Bąkowski, as the previous managers were imprisoned by the Communist government. In autumn 1982, Boguta returned, supported by several other activists, such as Piotr Szwajcer, Przemyslaw Cieslak, Marek Borowik, Jan Walc, Marek Chimiak, Jan Kofman, Andrzej Paczkowski, Miroslaw Kowalski, Marek Kubin, Andrzej Werner, and Adam Widmanski.

== See also ==
- Polish underground press
- Censorship in the Soviet Union
- Eastern Bloc information dissemination
- Samizdat
