= The Rats: A Witcher Tale =

2026 film by Mairzee Almas

- Directed by: Mairzee Almas
- Screenplay by: Haily Hall; Lauren Schmidt Hissrich
- Produced by: Michelle Camp; Tera Ragan
- Starring: Christelle Elwin; Ben Radcliffe; Fabian McCallum; Aggy K. Adams; Connor Crawford; Juliette Alexandra; Dolph Lundgren
- Music by: Mateusz "Matheo" Schmidt
- Distributed by: Netflix
- Release date: October 30, 2025
- Running time: 83 minutes
- Language: English

The Rats: A Witcher Tale is a 2025 television special released by Netflix on October 30, 2025. It serves as a prequel to the television series The Witcher and was released on the same day as the fourth season of the series. It is set before the eponymous young gang of street criminals known as the Rats cross paths with Ciri at the end of The Witcher's third season.

== Plot ==
A group of six young outlaws called the Rats consists of Mistle, Giselher, Kayleigh, Iskra, Asse, and Reef. Before becoming an outlaw, Mistle belonged to a wealthy noble family and was romantically involved with her handmaiden, Juniper. Bert Brigden, a mercenary working for Emperor Emhyr of Nilfgaard, attacks their village. Though Mistle manages to escape, Juniper dies.

The Rats discover an opportunity to steal a large amount of money from a newly established fighting arena owned by Dominik Houvenaghel, whose arena is managed by Brigden. However, Dominik Houvenaghel's arena is guarded by a deadly monster called a Jalowick. To carry out the plan, they recruit Brehen, a washed-up Witcher from the School of the Cat. He initially has little interest in helping the Rats, but eventually agrees to assist them in exchange for money. Brehen's relationship with the Rats starts complicated as he is a reluctant partner, only doing this for money. However, he soon bonds with them and becomes a somewhat father figure to Mistle. Meanwhile, Houvenaghel hires Leo Bonhart, a ruthless bounty hunter, to guard the arena.

During the heist, the Rats discover that Brigden is secretly conducting horrific experiments to create monsters from humans using alchemy. They are shocked when the Jalowick turns out to be Juniper, Mistle's former lover. Brehen tries to prepare a potion that could reverse the transformation. However, Leo Bonhart arrives at that time and fights Brehen to kill him and collect his Witcher medallion, while the Jalowick becomes more dangerous. Ultimately, Mistle is forced to kill the Jalowick to save her friends. The situation becomes more complicated when Brigden arrives and fights Mistle; however, he is killed by Asse. Realising that he cannot save himself as well as the outlaws from Bonhart, Brehen locks himself inside the vault with Bonhart, allowing the Rats to escape. Brehen is ultimately fatally wounded by Bonhart, though before dying he uses an explosive device, destroying the arena. Bonhart, however, survives and takes Brehen's Witcher medallion as a trophy, and vows to find The Rats.

The Rats celebrate their victory, but also mourn the deaths of Brehen and Juniper. They raise a toast to Brehen, Juniper, and the possibility of a better future.

Some time later, Bonhart retells the story to a captured Ciri as he drives a cart to deliver Ciri to his employer, along with the severed heads of all the Rats.

== Cast ==
- Christelle Elwin as Mistle
- Ben Radcliffe as Giselher
- Fabian McCallum as Kayleigh
- Aggy K. Adams as Iskra
- Connor Crawford as Asse
- Juliette Alexandra as Reef
- Dolph Lundgren as Brehen
- Ben Robson as Bert Brigden
- Sharlto Copley as Leo Bonhart
- Freya Allan as Ciri
- Deoudoné Pretorius as Juniper

== Production ==
Principal photography reportedly took place in Cape Town, South Africa, after the third season of The Witcher had wrapped filming. The production involved South African production personnel and international creative teams. It was originally developed as a six-to-eight-episode limited series, however, Netflix scrapped the idea after only two months of filming. Reports indicate that high production costs and the poor reception of The Witcher: Blood Origin spinoff series led to the reconsideration.

== Release ==
It was released as a feature-length special on October 30, 2025, alongside the fourth season of The Witcher.
