= Michael Ostrowski (disambiguation) =

Michael Ostrowski is an Austrian actor and screenwriter.

Michael Ostrowski may also refer to:

- Michael C. Ostrowski, an American cancer biologist and geneticist
- Mike Ostrowski, an American television producer

== See also ==
- Michał Ostrowski
