= The Witcher (TV series) =

Fantasy drama television series

- Genre: Action adventure; Fantasy drama
- Created by: Lauren Schmidt Hissrich
- Based on: The Witcher by Andrzej Sapkowski
- Showrunner: Lauren Schmidt Hissrich
- Starring: Henry Cavill; Anya Chalotra; Freya Allan; Eamon Farren; Joey Batey; MyAnna Buring; Royce Pierreson; Mimî M. Khayisa; Wilson Mbomio; Anna Shaffer; Mahesh Jadu; Tom Canton; Mecia Simson; Kim Bodnia; Graham McTavish; Cassie Clare; Hugh Skinner; Bart Edwards; Liam Hemsworth; Meng'er Zhang; Danny Woodburn; Christelle Elwin; Ben Radcliffe; Fabian McCallum; Aggy K. Adams; Connor Crawford; Juliette Alexandra; Laurence Fishburne
- Composers: Sonya Belousova; Giona Ostinelli; Joseph Trapanese
- Countries of origin: United States; Poland
- Original language: English
- No. of seasons: 4
- No. of episodes: 32

Production
- Executive producers: Lauren Schmidt Hissrich; Simon Emanuel; Alik Sakharov; Tomek Bagiński; Jarosław Sawko; Piotr Sikora; Jason F. Brown; Sean Daniel; Steve Gaub; Matt O'Toole; Mike Ostrowski; Karol Żbikowski
- Producer: Beau DeMayo
- Production locations: Hungary (season 1); United Kingdom (seasons 2–3); Iceland (season 4)
- Cinematography: Jean-Philippe Gossart; Gavin Struthers
- Editors: Liana Del Giudice; Nick Arthurs; Jean-Daniel Fernandez-Qundez; Xavier Russell
- Camera setup: Single-camera
- Running time: 47–67 minutes
- Production companies: Little Schmidt Productions; Hivemind; Platige Image

Original release
- Network: Netflix
- Release: December 20, 2019 – present

Related
- The Witcher: Nightmare of the Wolf; The Witcher: Blood Origin; The Witcher: Sirens of the Deep; The Rats: A Witcher Tale

The Witcher is a fantasy drama television series created by Lauren Schmidt Hissrich for Netflix. It is based on the book series (Note: Original title of the book series in Polish: Wiedźmin. Previously the series has had a number of different translations, including Hexer and Witcher, but following the release of the video games the word Witcher was selected as the standard translation of Wiedźmin into English.) by Polish author Andrzej Sapkowski. Set on a fictional, medieval-inspired landmass known as the Continent, The Witcher explores the legend of Geralt of Rivia, Yennefer of Vengerberg, and Princess Ciri. It stars Henry Cavill and Liam Hemsworth as Geralt, with Anya Chalotra and Freya Allan.

The first season, consisting of eight episodes, was released on Netflix on December 20, 2019, starring Cavill in the lead role. It was based on The Last Wish and Sword of Destiny, which are collections of short stories that precede the main The Witcher saga. The second season, also consisting of eight episodes and based on the novel Blood of Elves, was released on December 17, 2021. The third season, which also consists of eight episodes and is based on the novel Time of Contempt, was released in two volumes on June 29 and July 27, 2023. Hemsworth took over the role of Geralt of Rivia in the fourth season, based on the novel Baptism of Fire, which was released on October 30, 2025, also with eight episodes. In April 2024, the series was renewed for its fifth and final season.

An animated origin story film, Nightmare of the Wolf, was released on August 23, 2021. A prequel miniseries, Blood Origin, was released on December 25, 2022. A second animated film, Sirens of the Deep, was released on February 11, 2025. A feature-length special, The Rats: A Witcher Tale, was released on October 30, 2025.

== Synopsis ==
The story begins with Geralt of Rivia, Crown Princess Cirilla of Cintra, and the quarter-elf sorceress Yennefer of Vengerberg at different points in time, exploring formative events that shape their characters throughout the first season, before eventually merging into a single timeline.

Geralt and Ciri are linked by destiny since before she was born when he unknowingly demanded her as a reward for his services by invoking "the Law of Surprise". After the two finally meet, Geralt becomes the princess's protector and must help her and fight against her various pursuers to prevent her Elder Blood and powerful magic from being used for malevolent purposes and keep Ciri and their world safe.

== Cast and characters ==
=== Main ===
- Henry Cavill (seasons 1–3) and Liam Hemsworth (season 4) as Geralt of Rivia, a magically enhanced monster hunter known as a "witcher". He is linked to the Cintran princess Ciri by "destiny".
- Anya Chalotra as Yennefer of Vengerberg, a quarter-elf sorceress and Geralt's closest ally
- Freya Allan as Ciri / "Falka", or Cirilla Fiona Elen Riannon, the crown princess of the kingdom of Cintra, who possesses the Elder Blood gene that is capable of granting her immense magical abilities
- Eamon Farren as Cahir Mawr Dyffryn aep Ceallach, nicknamed the "Black Knight", a Nilfgaardian army commander who leads the invasion of Cintra and the hunt for Ciri
- Joey Batey as Jaskier, a traveling bard who befriends Geralt and accompanies him on his journey
- MyAnna Buring as Tissaia de Vries (seasons 1–3; guest season 4), Yennefer's mentor and the Rectoress of Aretuza, the training academy for sorceresses
- Mimî M. Khayisa as Fringilla Vigo, a sorceress who trained alongside Yennefer and later aids the Nilfgaardian Empire
- Anna Shaffer as Triss Merigold, the court sorceress of the kingdom of Temeria
- Royce Pierreson as Istredd, an adept mage and historian who befriends Yennefer
- Wilson Mbomio as Dara (seasons 1–3), a refugee elf boy who befriends Ciri
- Mahesh Jadu as Vilgefortz of Roggeveen, a charismatic sorcerer who rallies the northern mages to halt the invading Nilfgaardian army. He later becomes the leader of the Brotherhood of Mages.
- Tom Canton as Filavandrel (seasons 2–3; guest season 1), the king of the elves and Francesca's husband
- Mecia Simson as Francesca Findabair (season 2–present), an elven sorceress, queen of the elves, and Filavandrel's wife, who has made it her mission to lead her people into freedom and independence
- Kim Bodnia (season 2) and Peter Mullan (guest season 4) as Vesemir, the oldest living witcher and Geralt's mentor and father figure
  - Theo James has a vocal cameo in the first season as a young Vesemir. He reprises his role in the animated prequel film The Witcher: Nightmare of the Wolf.
- Graham McTavish as Sigismund Dijkstra (season 3–present; recurring season 2), the head of Redanian Intelligence and advisor to the ruler of Redania. McTavish also voiced Deglan in the animated prequel Nightmare of the Wolf.
- Cassie Clare as Philippa Eilhart (season 3–present; guest season 2), the shapeshifting court sorceress of Redania and Dijkstra's ally
- Hugh Skinner as Prince Radovid (season 3–present), the prince of the kingdom of Redania and later Jaskier's lover
- Bart Edwards as Duny, the "Urcheon of Erlenwald" / Emperor Emhyr var Emreis (season 3–present; guest seasons 1–2), the ruler of the Nilfgaardian Empire and Ciri's father, who was once afflicted by a curse that transformed him into a hedgehog man until midnight
- Meng'er Zhang as Milva (season 4; guest season 3), a highly skilled archer and one of the only non-dryad inhabitants of the Brokilon Forest who joins Geralt on his journey
- Danny Woodburn as Zoltan Chivay (season 4), a dwarf warrior who befriends Geralt
- Christelle Elwin, Ben Radcliffe, Fabian McCallum, Aggy K. Adams, Connor Crawford, and Juliette Alexandra as Mistle, Giselher, Kayleigh, Iskra, Asse, and Reef (season 4; guest season 3), a young gang of street criminals known as the Rats who encounter Ciri
- Laurence Fishburne as Emiel Regis (season 4), a mysterious vampire and barber surgeon who accompanies Geralt

=== Recurring ===
- Lars Mikkelsen as Stregobor (seasons 1, 3; guest season 2), the resident mage in the town of Blaviken and the Rector of Ban Ard, the training academy for male mages
- Jodhi May as Queen Calanthe (season 1; guest seasons 2–3), the ruler of the kingdom of Cintra and Ciri's grandmother
- Björn Hlynur Haraldsson as King Eist Tuirseach (season 1), Calanthe's husband and the king consort of Cintra
- Adam Levy as Mousesack (season 1; guest season 2), the court druid of Cintra and Calanthe's advisor
- Therica Wilson-Read as Sabrina Glevissig (seasons 1, 3–4; guest season 2), a sorceress who trained alongside Yennefer and later the court sorceress of the kingdom of Kaedwin
- Judit Fekete as Vanielle of Brugge (season 1), a sorceress residing at Aretuza
- Terence Maynard as Artorius Vigo (seasons 2–3; guest season 1), a court mage from Toussaint and Fringilla's uncle
- Paul Bullion as Lambert (season 2; guest season 4), a witcher at Kaer Morhen who trained alongside Geralt
- Yasen Atour as Coën (season 2; guest season 4), a witcher at Kaer Morhen and friend of Geralt
- Nathanial Jacobs, Jota Castellano, and Chuey Okoye as Everard, Gwain, and Merek (season 2), witchers residing at Kaer Morhen
- Ania Marson as Voleth Meir (season 2), a demon who came to the Continent with the Conjunction of the Spheres and feeds on pain
- Kaine Zajaz as Gage Findabair (season 2; guest season 3), Francesca's younger brother
- Ed Birch as King Vizimir (seasons 2–3), the ruler of the kingdom of Redania
- Chris Fulton (season 2) and Sam Woolf (season 3) as Rience, a renegade mage set on a hunt for Ciri
- Aisha Fabienne Ross as Lydia van Bredevoort (seasons 2–3), a disfigured sorceress allied with Vilgefortz who frees Rience from prison
- Robbie Amell as Gallatin (season 3), the commander of the Scoia'tael elves, who is vying for leadership over his people
- Safiyya Ingar as Keira Metz (season 3; guest season 4), a Temerian sorceress who runs a business specializing in magic portals
- Frances Pooley as Teryn (seasons 3–4), a half-elf girl with a strong resemblance to Ciri who was magically brainwashed into believing that she is someone else
- Cal Watson as Eva (seasons 3–4), an assassin posing as a handmaiden at the Redanian court and Philippa's lover
- Rochelle Rose as Margarita Laux-Antille (seasons 3–4), a sorceress and the new Rectoress of Aretuza
- Philip Philmar as Gerhart of Aelle (season 3), the oldest living member of the Brotherhood of Mages
- Ryan Hayes as Artaud Terranova (season 3), a mage and associate of Vilgefortz
- Jeremy Crawford as Yarpen Zigrin (season 4; guest seasons 1–3), the leader of a gang of dwarven mercenaries and a friend of Geralt
- James Purefoy as Stefan Skellen (season 4), a Nilfgaardian spymaster and Emhyr's fixer
- Linden Porco as Percival Schuttenbach (season 4), a gnome jeweler and Zoltan's traveling companion
- Audrey Kattan as Beata (season 4), a young refugee traveling with Zoltan and Percival
- Simon Paisley Day as Xarthisius (season 4), a Nilfgaardian mage and Emhyr's advisor
- Edmund Kingsley as Jocephus of Muroc (season 4), a mage who acts as Vilgefortz's lieutenant
- Ricky Champ and Miles Jovian as Toothless and Cloggy (season 4), a pair of cowardly villagers seeking to claim a bounty
- Sharlto Copley as Leo Bonhart (season 4), a ruthless bounty hunter hired to find Ciri
- Luisa Guerreiro as Ximer (season 4), a dwarven sorceress who answers Yennefer's call for help
- Su Douglas as Assire Var Anahid (season 4), an elderly witch who answers Yennefer's call for help
- Joelle Rae as Ida Emean Aep Sivney (season 4), an elven sorceress who answers Yennefer's call for help

=== Notable guest stars ===
==== Introduced in season 1 ====
- Emma Appleton as Renfri of Creyden, a princess-turned-bandit who leads a gang of brigands and has a bloody grudge against Stregobor
- Packy Lee as Nohorn, a bandit and member of Renfri's gang
- Mia McKenna-Bruce as Marilka, the daughter of the alderman of Blaviken
- Maciej Musiał as Sir Lazlo, a Cintran knight charged with protecting Ciri
- Tobi Bamtefa as Sir Danek, the commander of the Cintran royal guard
- Natasha Culzac as Toruviel, an elven warrior serving under Filavandrel
- Amit Shah as Torque, a sylvan ("horned devil") working for Filavandrel
- Shaun Dooley as King Foltest (seasons 1–2, 4), the ruler of the kingdom of Temeria, whose incestuous relationship with his sister created a daughter
- Jade Croot as Adda the White, Foltest's daughter, who suffers from a curse that turned her into a striga
- Julian Rhind-Tutt as Giltine, the enchanter of Aretuza
- Josette Simon (season 1) and Lorna Brown (season 3) as Eithne, the queen of the dryads of Brokilon Forest
- Blair Kincaid (season 1) and Jóhannes Haukur Jóhannesson (season 3) as Crach an Craite, a nobleman from the Skellige Isles and Eist's nephew
- Gaia Mondadori as Princess Pavetta (seasons 1–3), Calanthe's daughter and Ciri's mother
- Marcin Czarnik as the Ronin Mage, an assassin sent to murder the queen of Lyria and her infant daughter
- Lucas Englander as Chireadan, an elven healer from the city of Rinde
- Jordan Renzo as Eyck of Denesle, a virtuous yet pompous knight
- Steve Wall as Boholt, the leader of the Crinfrid Reavers, a group of dragon hunters
- Ron Cook as Borch Three Jackdaws, the golden dragon Villentretenmerth who disguises himself as a human
- Adele Oni and Colette Dalal Tchantcho as Téa and Véa, Borch's Zerrikanian bodyguards
- Ella-Rae Smith as Fola, a sorceress acolyte at Aretuza
- Francis Magee as Yurga, a travelling merchant who is rescued from monsters by Geralt
- Anna-Louise Plowman as Zola, Yurga's wife, who offers Ciri sanctuary
- Frida Gustavsson as Visenna, a sorceress healer and Geralt's mother
- Jack Bandeira as Caldemeyn, the young alderman of Blaviken

==== Introduced in season 2 ====
- Kristofer Hivju as Nivellen, an aristocrat who was transformed into a beast through a curse
- Agnes Born as Vereena, a bruxa and Nivellen's lover
- Basil Eidenbenz as Eskel, a witcher at Kaer Morhen who trained alongside Geralt
- Rebecca Hanssen as Queen Meve (seasons 2, 4), the ruler of the kingdom of Lyria and Rivia
- Luke Cy as King Ethain, the ruler of the kingdom of Cidaris
- Richard Tirado (season 2) and Vinny Moli (season 4) as King Demavend, the ruler of the kingdom of Aedirn
- Edward Rowe as King Henselt (seasons 2, 4), the ruler of the kingdom of Kaedwen
- Antony Byrne as General Hake, a political opponent to Fringilla Vigo
- Kevin Doyle as Ba'lian, an elf seeking refuge in the most unexpected of places
- Niamh McCormack as Lara Dorren, a powerful, ancient elven sorceress who fell in love with a human mage, Ciri's ancestor
- Simon Callow and Liz Carr as Ellis Codringher and Fenn (seasons 2–3), a pair of investigators who help Istredd with finding information
- Adjoa Andoh as Nenneke, the high priestess at the Temple of Melitele, who is acquainted with Geralt
- Sam Hazeldine as Eredin (seasons 2–3), an ancient elf and king of the legendary Wild Hunt

==== Introduced in season 3 ====
- Beau Holland as Vespula, Jaskier's on-and-off lover
- Tracy-Ann Oberman as Queen Hedwig, Vizimir's wife and the queen consort of Redania
- Catherine McCormack as Anika, a druid healer and old acquaintance of Geralt
- Dempsey Bovell as Otto Dussart, a werewolf who Geralt once spared and Anika's ally
- Giuseppe Lentini as Molnar Giancardi (seasons 3–4), a dwarven banker and owner of the Giancardi Bank
- Stuart Thompson as Fabio Sachs, an employee at the Giancardi Bank
- Michalina Olszańska as Marti Södergren, a sorceress and skilled healer
- Nathan Laryea as Valdo Marx (seasons 3–4), a bard and Jaskier's rival
- Josh Weller as Boris, one of Valdo's bandmates
- Hiftu Quasem as Falka, a half-elven rebel princess who was burned at the stake and appears in Ciri's visions

==== Introduced in season 4 ====
- Clive Russell as Stribog, an old storyteller who entertains children with the legend of Geralt
- Sha Dessi as Nimue, a young storyteller seeking her destiny
- Mei Mac as Burnita, a sorceress sent to kill Yennefer
- Eve Austin as Lady Gilda, a baron's daughter who is robbed by the Rats
- Ben Castle-Gibb as Hotspurn, an influential merchant who works with the Rats
- Isabel Mackinson as Talver, Beata's sister who is accused of witchcraft
- Gary Oliver as Vissegerd, a Cintran marshal who previously served under Calanthe

== Episodes ==
Season	Episodes		Originally released
1	8		December 20, 2019
2	8		December 17, 2021
3	8	5	June 29, 2023
3	8	3	July 27, 2023
4	8		October 30, 2025

=== Season 1 (2019) ===
The first season is based on The Last Wish and Sword of Destiny. A website with timelines for the show, along with in-depth summaries of events, was later created by Netflix.

No. overall	No. in season	Title	Directed by	Written by	Original release date
1	1	"The End's Beginning"	Alik Sakharov	Lauren Schmidt Hissrich	December 20, 2019
Following Geralt of Rivia's battle with a kikimora in 1231, he enters the town of Blaviken and meets Renfri, a cursed princess-turned-bandit. She is hunted by the wizard Stregobor, who believes her evil for being born during an eclipse. Stregobor lures Geralt to his hideout, seeking to hire him to kill Renfri, but Geralt refuses. Renfri later offers Geralt a counterproposal, but Geralt refuses, issuing an ultimatum: leave or die. Renfri feigns agreement with the ultimatum, but upon waking up the next morning, Geralt realizes Renfri will not stop until Stregobor is dead, and he rushes to stop her. After killing her men, he fights and fatally wounds Renfri, whose dying words tell of a girl in the forest who is his eternal destiny. Stregobor arrives to take Renfri's body for autopsy. When Geralt opposes, the townsfolk force him to leave, urged on by Stregobor. In 1263, Nilfgaard conquers the northern kingdom of Cintra. Princess Cirilla, also known as Ciri, is sent away by her grandmother, Queen Calanthe, to escape and find Geralt. Cahir, a Nilfgaardian officer, captures Cirilla, but when she sees the burning city and castle, her powers are triggered, allowing her to escape. Based on "The Lesser Evil" from The Last Wish.
2	2	"Four Marks"	Alik Sakharov	Jenny Klein	December 20, 2019
In 1206, hunchback Yennefer from Vengerberg of Aedirn is sold to Tissaia de Vries by her father. She is taken to Aretuza for training in magic, but finds the practice difficult. She forms a friendship with Istredd, even revealing her quarter-elf heritage, which caused her deformity. Unbeknownst to either, Tissaia and Stregobor were using Yennefer and Istredd, respectively, to spy on each other. Later, Yennefer witnesses Tissaia turn three students into eels to serve as conduits for magic to power Aretuza. In 1240, Geralt is hired to investigate grain thefts in Posada, and is followed by Jaskier the bard. They encounter a Sylvan named Torque, who knocks them unconscious and takes them to his mountain cave. There, Geralt meets Filavandrel, the elven king, and urges him to lead his people to better lands after being banished by the humans. Instead of killing them, Filavandrel frees Geralt and Jaskier, taking the witcher's words to heart. In 1263, Cirilla encounters Dara, a boy in the woods, who guides her to a refugee camp. Dara returns to save her when Cahir's forces attack the camp; she later realizes Dara is an elf. Based on "The Edge of the World" from The Last Wish.
3	3	"Betrayer Moon"	Alex García López	Beau DeMayo	December 20, 2019
In 1210, Yennefer and Istredd become lovers while finishing their training. While Yennefer has the chance to transform her body into her ideal image during graduation, the Brotherhood of Sorcerers discusses assigning their newly initiated to their respective kingdoms. Through Stregobor's scheming, Yennefer is assigned to Nilfgaard rather than her preferred Aedirn because of her elven blood. Yennefer angrily breaks off her relationship with Istredd, knowing only he could have told Stregobor about her heritage. Having missed graduation, Yennefer undergoes the painful transformation to be beautiful at the cost of her fertility. With her new body, Yennefer charms Aedirn's King Virfuril into taking her as advisor, sending Fringilla to Nilfgaard instead. In 1243, Geralt enters the kingdom of Temeria to investigate a monster, assisted by Triss Merigold, King Foltest's sorceress advisor. He identifies the monster as a strzyga, a creature born of a curse he later learns was placed by the courtier Ostrit, who learned of the incestual affair between Foltest and his sister, Princess Adda. Using Ostrit as bait, Geralt fights to contain the strzyga until dawn, when the curse is lifted. In 1263, Cirilla enters a dense forest in a trance as Dara follows to help. Based on "The Witcher" from The Last Wish.
4	4	"Of Banquets, Bastards and Burials"	Alex García López	Declan de Barra	December 20, 2019
In 1240, having served Aedirn for thirty years, Yennefer, along with Queen Kalis of Lyria, is ambushed by an assassin. In the ensuing chase, Yennefer flees, unable to save Kalis and her newborn daughter from the assassin. In 1249, Geralt accompanies Jaskier to the betrothal feast of Princess Pavetta, Queen Calanthe's daughter. Urcheon of Erlenwald (also named Duny) interrupts to demand Pavetta's hand through the Law of Surprise, having saved her father's life several years earlier. Urcheon suffers from a curse that has transformed him into a humanoid hedgehog. Despite Pavetta's acceptance, Calanthe refuses, and a brawl ensues. When Calanthe tries to kill Urcheon, Pavetta activates her power, unleashing a maelstrom until Geralt and Mousesack intervene. Wanting her daughter to be happy, Calanthe marries Duny and Pavetta, which lifts his curse. Duny, thankful for Geralt's aid, insists that he take a reward. Geralt jokingly invokes the Law of Surprise for something Duny has but does not yet know. The crowd then immediately learns Pavetta is pregnant. In 1263, Nilfgaard's forces resume their pursuit of Cirilla, Pavetta's daughter, with Mousesack as their prisoner. Meanwhile, Cirilla and Dara encounter the dryad queen Eithne in Brokilon Forest, while Cahir and Fringilla track Ciri's location. Based on "A Question of Price" from The Last Wish, and "Sword of Destiny" from Sword of Destiny.
5	5	"Bottled Appetites"	Charlotte Brändström	Sneha Koorse	December 20, 2019
In 1256, seven years after Pavetta's betrothal, Geralt and Jaskier discover a djinn and accidentally release it. Initially, it seems that Jaskier is the djinn 'master', but then he falls seriously ill. Geralt seeks help from the nearest healer, the elf Chireadan, but since they need a mage to heal Jaskier, Chireadan reluctantly refers them to Yennefer. Although Yennefer cures Jaskier, her plan is to use him to capture the djinn and force it to grant her her wish of regaining her fertility. As Jaskier uses his last wish, nothing happens, and it is revealed that Geralt, not Jaskier, has actually gained the wishes. Geralt realizes the djinn will kill Yennefer, so he uses his third and final wish to save her (but the wish itself is not revealed). The djinn leaves. Now free and safe, Yennefer asks what his third wish was, but Geralt falls asleep after they have sex without answering. In 1263, Cahir hires a doppler to assume the identity of Mousesack; the doppler copies his physical form and memories, then kills him. Later, Eithne allows Ciri to stay in Brokilon, but "Mousesack" arrives and requests that Ciri and Dara leave with him. Based on "The Last Wish" from The Last Wish.
6	6	"Rare Species"	Charlotte Brändström	Haily Hall	December 20, 2019
In 1262, Geralt, Jaskier, Yennefer, and a group of monster hunters are invited on a dragon hunt by Borch and his bodyguards, along with a band of dwarves. After camping overnight, they find the Reavers have left. On their way, the bridge collapses, and Borch's group sacrifices themselves to save the rest. Geralt and Yennefer reconcile before finding a dead dragon in its den, guarded by the bodyguards. Borch, revealed as a golden dragon, explains that he protected the dragon's egg as he knew the group wouldn't harm it. They defend the egg from the Reavers, and Borch rewards the dwarves with dragon teeth. Geralt reveals his third wish to Yennefer, linking their fates together. Feeling that her emotions are insincere, Yennefer ends their relationship and departs. This leaves Geralt angry and hurt; he blames Jaskier for his misfortunes before leaving him. Ciri quickly deduces that "Mousesack" is an impostor and escapes, but Dara has had enough and leaves her. Based on "The Bounds of Reason" from Sword of Destiny.
7	7	"Before a Fall"	Alik Sakharov & Marc Jobst	Mike Ostrowski	December 20, 2019
In 1263, with Nilfgaard poised to invade Cintra, Geralt decides to invoke his Law of Surprise and claim Ciri to protect her, but Calanthe, unwilling to give up the last remaining strand of her daughter's life, offers a different young girl in Ciri's place. After realising the deception, Geralt confronts Calanthe and is then imprisoned by Eist. After visiting Istredd and failing to reignite their relationship, Yennefer returns to Aretuza with the sorcerer Vilgefortz. When he announces his intention to rally mages to oppose Nilfgaard, she declines. The Brotherhood votes to remain neutral, but Tissaia, Vilgefortz, Triss, and other mages resolve to fight. Tissaia convinces Yennefer to join. Nilfgaard invades Cintra, sacking the city and breaching the castle. Calanthe tries to send Ciri away with Geralt, but he has escaped his cell and is nowhere to be found. Ciri fends for herself after escaping Cintra, stealing a horse from a woman who offers her shelter. Later, she is discovered by her old friends, who suddenly turn on her, and her powers activate. Based on "Something More" from Sword of Destiny.
8	8	"Much More"	Marc Jobst	Lauren Schmidt Hissrich	December 20, 2019
Having escaped from Cintra, Geralt defends a merchant from undead monsters, but is wounded and loses consciousness. Yennefer and the mages reinforce the keep of Sodden Hill, aiming to prevent Nilfgaardian forces from invading the remaining Northern Kingdoms. The Nilfgaardians launch their attack, and a battle starts. Tissaia attempts to talk down Fringilla, but Fringilla disables her. Vilgefortz fights Cahir, but loses and is thrown down a hill. When Vilgefortz wakes up, he kills a Northern sorcerer, revealing himself to be a turncoat. Nilfgaardian soldiers begin to overrun the fort, but Yennefer channels a massive stream of fire, annihilating much of the army before seemingly disappearing. Ciri is awakened by the woman she stole the horse from earlier, and discovers the dead bodies around her. The woman takes her to her farm. Geralt dreams about his mother, Visenna, who abandoned him as a child to be made into a witcher, then wakes to find himself on the merchant's cart. When they arrive at the merchant's farm, he hears the woman talk to the man about Ciri. He heads into the forest, where Ciri and Geralt finally meet and embrace. She asks Geralt who Yennefer is. Based on "Something More" from Sword of Destiny.

=== Season 2 (2021) ===
The second season is based on "A Grain of Truth" from The Last Wish, Blood of Elves, and the beginning of Time of Contempt.

No. overall	No. in season	Title	Directed by	Written by	Original release date
9	1	"A Grain of Truth"	Stephen Surjik	Declan de Barra	December 17, 2021
On the battlefield after the victory of the Northern Kingdoms, Geralt and Ciri encounter Tissaia, who tells them that Yennefer is dead. Traveling with Ciri, Geralt stops to visit his friend Nivellen and discovers that he has been cursed into a beast by a priestess for vandalizing a temple. Geralt investigates the nearby village and determines that a Bruxa—a vampire—caused the villagers to flee. He returns and sees the Bruxa drinking Nivellen's blood. Geralt fights and kills it, which lifts Nivellen's curse. Nivellen reveals that he loved the Bruxa and did nothing to stop her from attacking the village, and that his curse stemmed from his raping the priestess. Nivellen begs Geralt to kill him, but Geralt refuses. In Aretuza, Tissaia tortures Cahir for information on Nilfgaard. Fringilla has taken Yennefer captive and is heading towards Cintra, but their party is ambushed on the road. Based on "A Grain of Truth" from The Last Wish.
10	2	"Kaer Morhen"	Stephen Surjik	Beau DeMayo	December 17, 2021
Yennefer and Fringilla are captured by elves, who are digging near a ruined monolith. Their leader, sorceress Francesca Findabair, is having visions of a white-robed figure she believes to be the elven prophet Ithlinne. Yennefer and Fringilla also dream of robed figures, red and black, respectively. The three sorceresses find a hidden passage leading to a magic hut. There, they meet the Deathless Mother, a mysterious being who takes on a different form for each – Yennefer sees a younger Tissaia, Fringilla sees Emperor Emhyr, and Francesca sees Ithlinne – and reveals the path each must take to achieve their greatest desire. The sorceresses are released. Fringilla joins Francesca to form an elven-Nilfgaardian alliance; Yennefer calls them fools and discovers she has lost her magic. Geralt and Ciri join the remaining witchers at Kaer Morhen. Eskel arrives late, after hunting a leshy. The witchers are partying when their medallions start vibrating, indicating a monster is near. Geralt discovers Eskel was infected by the leshy and has been transformed into one. Unable to control his leshy side, Eskel attacks Vesemir, forcing Geralt to kill him. Realizing Kaer Morhen is not safe, Geralt agrees to train Ciri in combat.
11	3	"What Is Lost"	Sarah O'Gorman	Teleplay by : Lauren Schmidt Hissrich & Clare Higgins; Story by : Clare Higgins	December 17, 2021
Ciri continues to train in swordsmanship, fitness, and agility. Vesemir investigates the mutated leshy. Yennefer makes her way to Aretuza; Tissaia informs her that her absence has aroused suspicions regarding her allegiance among the Brotherhood, and implores her to lie low. Stregobor interrogates Yennefer until Tissaia intervenes. She later reveals to Yennefer that she knows that she lost her magic. The Council of the Brotherhood decrees that to prove her loyalty, Yennefer must execute Cahir. During the execution ceremony, in front of an audience of the Brotherhood and the Northern monarchs, Yennefer releases Cahir and the two escape. A pregnant Francesca and the elves settle in Cintra under the protection of Nilfgaard. In Kaer Morhen, Geralt reveals to Ciri that she may have inherited magical powers from her mother. They track down the leshy. During the battle, a centipede-like monster—a myriapod—appears, kills the leshy, and pursues Ciri. Geralt kills the myriapod.
12	4	"Redanian Intelligence"	Sarah O'Gorman	Sneha Koorse	December 17, 2021
Triss arrives at Kaer Morhen, having been invited by Geralt to help Ciri in magical training. Geralt, Ciri, and Triss investigate the origins of the myriapod and leshy, finding that they are connected to monoliths. Ciri confesses that she toppled a monolith in Cintra. Triss portals Geralt to Istredd, who is known for studying monoliths. Vesemir discovers that Ciri has Elder blood, long thought extinct and rumored to be an ingredient in mutagens used to create more witchers, but the art had been lost a long time ago. Now wanted, Yennefer and Cahir escape to the city of Oxenfurt in the North, where a pogrom against elves is taking place. In Redania, Sigismund Dijkstra and Philippa Eilhart, spymaster and court mage, respectively, to King Vizimir, began plotting the seizure of Cintra. They recruit the imprisoned elf Dara as an informant. Meanwhile, Yennefer and Cahir discover that a figure called The Sandpiper, revealed to be Jaskier, is smuggling elves to Cintra. With Jaskier's help, Yennefer, Cahir, and Dara board the ship bound for Cintra. After Jaskier leaves, Yennefer finds that he has gotten into trouble.
13	5	"Turn Your Back"	Ed Bazalgette	Haily Hall	December 17, 2021
Rience, a fire mage, is freed from prison and tasked to find Ciri by the sorceress Lydia, who is serving an unknown master. Geralt and Istredd travel to the fallen monolith outside Cintra. Yennefer, having disembarked from the ship, rescues Jaskier from Rience; they are then separated and captured by city guards. Vesemir reveals his plan to create new witchers to Ciri. Ciri agrees but insists on being the first candidate. Investigating the ruins of the monolith, Geralt and Istredd hypothesize that the monoliths are gateways that, when activated, allow monsters to enter their world. Geralt learns from Istredd that Yennefer is alive. Triss, attempting to dissuade Ciri, conducts a ritual to discover Ciri's source of power. They uncover Ithlinne's prophecy, which predicts that a child of the Elder blood will destroy the world. Ciri's powers activate the Cintra monolith, causing a Chernobog to appear, which then flies away. Geralt portals back to Kaer Morhen, stopping Ciri from taking part in the conversion. Cahir arrives at Cintra. Yennefer summons the Deathless Mother and disappears; she is tasked with delivering Ciri to a location outside Cintra.
14	6	"Dear Friend"	Louise Hooper	Matthew D'Ambrosio	December 17, 2021
Geralt and Ciri are attacked by a Chernobog. Geralt kills it, but Roach, his horse, is fatally wounded. At Kaer Morhen, Rience steals mutagens and escapes after ambushing Vesemir and Triss. Geralt puts Roach out of her misery. He and Ciri head to the Temple of Melitele. Yennefer arrives, realizing Ciri's significance for restoring her magic. Francesca gives birth to the first full elf in years. Cahir reveals Emhyr's visit to Cintra. Istredd discovers a connection between Ciri and Lara Dorren, a legendary elven warrior. Yennefer warns Geralt about Jaskier's trouble. Rience, the fire mage, hunts for Ciri. Rience appears at the temple with the Michelet Brothers. Geralt holds him off as Yennefer teaches Ciri to open a portal. Rience escapes, and Yennefer and Ciri disappear through the portal. Triss tells Tissaia about Ciri's Elder blood.
15	7	"Voleth Meir"	Louise Hooper	Mike Ostrowski	December 17, 2021
Yennefer and Ciri portal to the home of the woman who took Ciri in and discover the family was murdered by Rience. Meanwhile, Geralt frees Jaskier from prison. Jaskier tells him about Yennefer's lost magic and her muttered incantation. Recognizing the incantation, Geralt realizes Yennefer is in league with Voleth Meir (the Deathless Mother), a demon that feeds on pain. The birth of Francesca's baby causes the elves to focus on rebuilding instead of fighting for Nilfgaard. Frustrated with her slipping grasp on power, Fringilla assassinates four of the White Flame's generals and intimidates Cahir into vouching for her to the emperor. Tissaia tells Vilgefortz about Ciri, betraying Triss. Dara quits spying for Dijkstra. Ciri inadvertently reads Yennefer's mind and sees her betrayal. Upset, she has an outburst that alerts a nearby Nilfgaardian patrol, but Geralt and Jaskier, aided by Yarpen Zigrin's dwarven crew, arrive in time to defeat them. Geralt draws his blade on Yennefer while Yarpen and Jaskier take Ciri to Kaer Morhen. In the castle, Francesca and Filavandrel awaken to find their baby murdered, and Francesca's outburst of pain gives Voleth Meir the strength to break free and possess Ciri.
16	8	"Family"	Ed Bazalgette	Lauren Schmidt Hissrich	December 17, 2021
At Kaer Morhen, Voleth Meir, possessing Ciri's body, murders several witchers. Geralt, Vesemir, and the remaining witchers are unable to contain her, but Yennefer offers herself as a host to Voleth Meir, freeing Ciri from her control. Ciri teleports herself, Geralt, and Yennefer to an unknown world where Voleth Meir leaves Yennefer's body, recreates her own, and rejoins the Wild Hunt, who threaten to abduct Ciri before she teleports them back to Kaer Morhen. There, Yennefer discovers her powers have returned, and Geralt decides they must leave as Ciri's power and right to the throne of Cintra will make her a target. Meanwhile, the Northern monarchs meet with Tissaia and put a bounty on Ciri. In Redania, Francesca, who blames the Northern kingdoms for the loss of her baby, kills human babies in retaliation. Later, she learns of Ciri's Elder blood and resolves to seek her out as the hope of the elvenkind. Emperor Emhyr, revealed to be Ciri's father, Duny, arrives in Cintra, reveals that he killed Francesca's newborn, and takes action against Fringilla and Cahir.

=== Season 3 (2023) ===
The third season is based on Time of Contempt and details from Blood of Elves and parts of Baptism of Fire.

No. overall	No. in season	Title	Directed by	Written by	Original release date
Volume 1
17	1	"Shaerrawedd"	Stephen Surjik	Mike Ostrowski	June 29, 2023
Having left Kaer Morhen, Geralt, Yennefer, and Ciri are on the run from bounty hunters while continuing Ciri's training in fighting and sorcery. After six months, they settle into a home provided by Yarpen Zigrin, but when a jackapace attacks on Rience's orders, the trio decides to lure Rience into a trap to deal with him once and for all. Francesca Findabair's Scoia'tael are looking for Ciri, whom they see as the destined savior of the elves. In Redania, King Vizimir is disillusioned with his spymaster, Dijkstra, and his court mage, Philippa Eilhart, for failing to capture Ciri, whom he intended to marry, so he entrusts the task to his brother, Radovid. Redanians secretly negotiate with Jaskier about Ciri, whom they supported in his altruistic actions as the Sandpiper. At the elven ruins of Shaerrawedd, Geralt, Yennefer, Ciri, Jaskier, and Yarpen's party are confronted by both Rience's men and the Scoia'tael. A three-way battle ensues, and Yennefer learns Rience acts on behalf of an unknown, powerful mage, suggesting they seek help from Tissaia de Vries. Jaskier tells Philippa and Radovid he will help them get Ciri, but they need to win her trust by taking out Rience.
18	2	"Unbound"	Stephen Surjik	Tania Lotia	June 29, 2023
Yennefer and Ciri travel incognito to Aretuza, but Ciri's uncontrolled magic hinders and compromises them, causing conflict between the two until they reconcile over their similar backgrounds. At Aretuza, Triss Merigold, now a teacher, discovers several students are missing. In Nilfgaard-controlled Cintra, a demoted Fringilla escapes imprisonment, and Cahir is saved from attackers by Gallatin, his elf friend and member of the Scoia'tael. Geralt and Jaskier visit Codringher and Fenn for information on Rience, and the investigators reveal that Rience and his mastermind's base of operations is a Redanian castle called Vuilpanne. Later, Rience interrogates Codringher and Fenn about Geralt before murdering them, spied on by Philippa. At Vuilpanne, Geralt slays a monster, who turns out to be three women transformed by mutagenic sorcery, and he also saves a distraught half-elven girl from the fortress. After getting to safety, the girl recognizes Geralt and claims to be Ciri.
19	3	"Reunion"	Gandja Monteiro	Haily Hall	June 29, 2023
Geralt brings the half-elven girl to his friend Anika, a druidess, who learns that the girl's name is Teryn and she was subjected to mind-control magic. Geralt tries to extract information from Teryn, but an unknown mage possesses her and attacks everyone. Later, an injured Anika reveals to Geralt that her old friend, Visenna, has passed away. In Gors Velen, Yennefer meets Tissaia de Vries while Ciri causes mayhem in the city, drawing attention to herself once more when she exposes a con artist thanks to her witcher knowledge. After slaying a runaway wyvern, she is robbed, and while pursuing the thief, she encounters Yennefer and other sorceresses who take her to a bathhouse. Disillusioned and frustrated with their behavior, Ciri runs away after a fight with Yennefer. Istredd is looking for the Book of Monoliths, a tome of ancient and dangerous elven magic. Philippa and Dijkstra have the Queen Mother of Redania killed to gain control of her son. After learning of Francesca's actions, Emperor Emhyr instructs Cahir to prove his loyalty. This leads Cahir to murder Gallatin. On the run from Gors Velen, Ciri is ambushed by the Wild Hunt before being saved by Geralt.
20	4	"The Invitation"	Gandja Monteiro	Rae Benjamin	June 29, 2023
Emperor Emhyr commands Cahir to assassinate Francesca. Upon reaching her and the Scoia'tael, Cahir persuades her to join forces in their search for Ciri. Fringilla enjoys her newfound freedom. Aboard a ship to Aretuza, Geralt, Ciri, Jaskier, and the rest of the crew are attacked by an aeschna, which Geralt and Ciri kill. At Aretuza, Yennefer convinces the Brotherhood of Sorcerers to host a conclave for mages to strengthen the unity of the North against Nilfgaard. Later, Yennefer visits the Redanian court to invite Philippa Eilhart and to try to win the support of King Vizimir, who orders not only Philippa but also Dijkstra and Radovid to attend. On her way back, Yennefer is ambushed. Meanwhile, Triss and Istredd investigate the missing Aretuzan students and the Book of Monoliths, respectively. Similarly to Yennefer and Geralt, they conclude that Stregobor is the mastermind behind those events and Rience's actions. Ciri and Jaskier are kept in a safe haven outside of Aretuza. There, Jaskier is approached by Radovid, who confesses their romantic feelings for one another, and they kiss. Geralt, Yennefer, and the Northern mages gather at Aretuza to begin the conclave with a banquet.
21	5	"The Art of Illusion"	Loni Peristere	Clare Higgins	June 29, 2023
Once the banquet is over, Geralt and Yennefer discuss the night's events in retrospective. Despite his disdain, Geralt socializes with the reveling sorcerers as Yennefer reminds him they need to lie low in order to expose Stregobor during the following conclave. Their plans change, however, when Yennefer is alerted by Istredd and Triss about Stregobor's possession of the Book of Monoliths. Geralt and Istredd pretend a fight to cover for Yennefer as she breaks into Stregobor's study, where they discover the book, as well as apparent evidence of kidnapping half-elven students. Stregobor is arrested by Tissaia, Vilgefortz, and Artorius, and the banquet is deemed a diplomatic success. Once Yennefer and Geralt put all the pieces of the night together, however, they realize the mastermind behind Rience's actions and the kidnappings is Vilgefortz, who only framed Stregobor. Scouting the halls to clear their path, Geralt is distracted by the sounds of a distant fight and ambushed at knife-point by Dijkstra.
Volume 2
22	6	"Everybody Has a Plan 'til They Get Punched in the Face"	Loni Peristere	Javier Grillo-Marxuach	July 27, 2023
Dijkstra takes Geralt prisoner. Redanian soldiers led by Philippa, along with Northern mages, strike a coup and arrest mages who collaborated with Nilfgaard under Vilgefortz. Disbelieving the accusation, Tissaia frees the apprehended mages only for Vilgefortz to reveal himself as the traitor and flee Aretuza to capture Ciri. Before that, he allows Nilfgaardian and Scoia'tael forces led by Cahir and Francesca to invade Aretuza. This starts a battle between them and the Northern mages. Radovid seemingly tries to kidnap Ciri, but is caught red-handed by Jaskier. Geralt, Ciri, and Yennefer are ambushed by Rience, but kill him together. Yennefer then decides to join the battle, which leaves Aretuza in ruins as many die on both sides, including Filavandrel and Stregobor. Geralt and Ciri are saved from the Scoia'tael by Cahir, who has a change of heart, but they are soon encountered by Vilgefortz. Geralt commands Ciri to run and fights Vilgefortz, who defeats him and follows Ciri. Grievously wounded, Geralt is found by Triss, who takes him to Brokilon. Before being captured at the tower of Tor Lara, Ciri taps into a monolith's power, unleashing an explosion that destroys the tower.
23	7	"Out of the Fire, Into the Frying Pan"	Bola Ogun	Matthew D'Ambrosio	July 27, 2023
At Aretuza, Jaskier confronts Radovid about his attempt to capture Ciri for Redania, and the two part ways. Jaskier also reunites with Yennefer, who reveals that Ciri is missing. In Brokilon, dryads led by Queen Eithné take care of the wounded Geralt. Teleported through a portal at Tor Lara, Ciri appears in the wasteland of the Korath desert. Struggling to find water or food, she is encountered by a unicorn she names "Little Horse", who keeps her company. Wandering the desert for days, Ciri is tormented by visions of the past and future, her loved ones, and Falka, a half-elven princess burnt at the stake for her crimes. A desert monster wounds Little Horse and attacks Ciri, who is persuaded by the vision of Falka to use fire magic to heal the unicorn. As she does, a fiery vision nearly consumes her before she relinquishes her magic and loses consciousness, waking up surrounded by bounty hunters. Jaskier visits Brokilon and learns that the forest has become a refuge for people fleeing the war between the North and Nilfgaard. As he finds a recovering Geralt, he informs him of rumors about Ciri being on her way to Nilfgaard.
24	8	"The Cost of Chaos"	Bola Ogun	Mike Ostrowski & Troy Dangerfield	July 27, 2023
Searching for Ciri, Yennefer meets with Crach an Craite, who heard that Ciri is going to Nilfgaard. Yennefer and other mages raid Vilgefortz's fortress, but find it empty save for the corpses of kidnapped Aretuzan students. Later, they encounter Philippa, who blames Tissaia for the tragic outcome of the Thanedd Coup. Guilt-ridden, Tissaia commits suicide in Aretuza. With the old Brotherhood of Sorcerers gone, the remaining mages decide to take over and stop Vilgefortz. In Redania, King Vizimir orders Dijkstra to murder Philippa as a scapegoat for the failed coup, but Philippa, forewarned, orchestrates Vizimir's assassination and crowns Radovid. Geralt, healed by Yennefer, sets out to save Ciri from Emhyr, accompanied by Jaskier and young archer Milva. Fringilla and Francesca arrive in Nilfgaard, plotting against Emhyr, but when Fringilla accidentally reveals the truth about Nilfgaard's part in the murder of her baby, Francesca leaves, swearing revenge. Later, Emhyr welcomes Ciri to the Nilfgaardian court, but, seemingly unbeknownst to him, she turns out to be Teryn posing as Ciri. Captured by bounty hunters, Ciri is saved by the Rats, a bandit group who encourage her to kill her kidnapper. When they ask her name, Ciri introduces herself as "Falka".

=== Season 4 (2025) ===
The fourth season is based on the rest of Baptism of Fire and The Tower of the Swallow.

No. overall	No. in season	Title	Directed by	Written by	Original release date
25	1	"What Doesn't Kill You Makes You Stronger"	Sergio Mimica-Gezzan	Lauren Schmidt Hissrich	October 30, 2025
On their way to Nilfgaard, Geralt, Jaskier, and Milva save Cahir from Nilfgaardian soldiers but leave him behind, with Geralt threatening to kill him for his previous pursuit of Ciri. The group later joins up with the dwarf smith Zoltan and his gnome friend Percival who are escorting war refugees. Cahir secretly follows the group despite Geralt's threats. Meanwhile, Yennefer is trying to track down Vilgefortz who is gathering a legion of loyalists and reinforcing public hatred towards mages post-Thanedd Coup. After an angry mob kills Keira, Yennefer and her allies begin gathering an army against Vilgefortz and his forces. In Redania, Philippa faces distrust in court, and she is forced to flee as Dijkstra threatens to reveal to Radovid that she murdered Vizimir. Ciri joins the Rats and forms an intimate bond with one of their members, Mistle.
26	2	"Dream of a Wish Fulfilled"	Sergio Mimica-Gezzan	Tania Lotia	October 30, 2025
Ciri aids the Rats during a robbery, saves them from being captured by the city watch and later earns them gratitude of the local commonfolk, upon which the Rats formally accept her as one of them. Meanwhile, Emhyr has grown suspicious of Teryn who is posing as Ciri. Realizing she is an impostor, Emhyr commands Skellen, his spymaster, to find the real Ciri, as he needs to marry her and father a child to fulfill a prophecy. Yennefer recruits Philippa and Fringilla, with the former providing her castle Montecalvo as a headquarters for the resistance and the latter infiltrating the Stygga Castle, Vilgefortz's hideout, to spy on him. Vilgefortz is revealed to be holding Istredd captive, using him to tamper with the monoliths to block other mages than his own from using portals. Geralt and his party encounter Regis, a mysterious barber-surgeon, who gives them shelter, heals Geralt's wounded leg and joins them on their journey toward Nilfgaard.
27	3	"Trial by Ordeal"	Tricia Brock	Rae Benjamin	October 30, 2025
At Montecalvo, sorceresses from across the Continent meet and join the resistance, among them Francesca, whom Yennefer kidnapped and who reveals Ciri's Elder blood to the others. After making contact with Fringilla, the sorceresses realize that they need to bait Vilgefortz into attacking Montecalvo. Ciri and the Rats rob a noblewoman, leading them to become wanted persons, and Ciri becomes increasingly ingrained with the Rats despite the suspicions of Kayleigh, one of the members. Emhyr confronts Vilgefortz about his betrayal and the two part ways. Tasked with finding Ciri for Emhyr, Skellen is secretly plotting against his emperor. Geralt and his group are joined by Yarpen before saving Beata, one of the refugees, and her sister Talva in a refugee camp from being falsely burned at the stake as witches by a priest. The camp is soon attacked by Nilfgaardian soldiers. Beata is killed, Talva flees, and Geralt is knocked unconscious. Skellen tasks a feared bounty hunter Leo Bonhart, who has a history with the Rats, with finding and killing them, including Ciri.
28	4	"A Sermon of Survival"	Tricia Brock	Troy Dangerfield	October 30, 2025
Geralt and Jaskier are captured by troops belonging to the Northern Kingdoms. Dijkstra finds them and tortures Geralt to create a rift between Jaskier and Radovid so that Radovid will focus on his royal duties rather than his personal issues. The scheme is successful after Jaskier chooses his friendship with Geralt over his feelings for Radovid. Triss brings Vesemir and his Witchers to Montecalvo to help defend against Vilgefortz, and the sorceresses are trained in armed combat. Ciri learns that The Rats have a history with Leo Bonhart, but they are unaware that he is pursuing them. Ciri also opens up to Mistle about her background, revealing that she knew Geralt of Rivia, though she doesn't reveal her identity. As Radovid assumes control over his army, he also exiles Dijkstra, unwilling to be manipulated by him any longer, as Eva takes him away. Geralt and Jaskier are saved by Regis before parting ways with the group. Geralt tells Jaskier that Regis is a vampire. The camp soon comes under attack as Milva, Yarpen, Zoltan, and Percival arrive to save Geralt and Jaskier. Geralt encounters Cahir and spares his life as he helps them escape when Jaskier is wounded.
29	5	"The Joy of Cooking"	Alex García López	Matthew D'Ambrosio	October 30, 2025
Geralt and his group tell each other stories from their lives as they wait to cross a river: Zoltan and Yarpen tell of how Zoltan went into exile after being falsely accused of selling dwarven weapons to humans. Jaskier tells of how his songs were stolen by the rival bard Valdo Marx in a musical flashback. Milva describes her abusive upbringing and attempts to save elven refugees from persecution while living with druids after killing her abusive stepfather. Regis rejoins the group and tells of how he swore off consuming blood after losing the love of his life as the flashback is depicted in animated form. Cahir tells of how he took care of Emhyr when the latter lived in the forest as the Urcheon, making Geralt realize that Emhyr is Ciri's father Duny and that he wishes to marry his own daughter to fulfil Ithlinne's prophecy. Meanwhile, Fringilla discovers the captured Istredd, but is quickly captured herself and tortured for information. She manages to warn Yennefer as Vilgefortz prepares to attack Montecalvo.
30	6	"Twilight of the Wolf"	Alex García López	Javier Grillo-Marxuach	October 30, 2025
Vilgefortz and his forces attack Montecalvo. A battle ensues and both Margarita and Vesemir are killed in the fighting. Fringilla frees Istredd, who sacrifices himself to destroy Vilgefortz's control over the network of portals which allows Yennefer and her surviving allies to outmaneuver and kill Vilgefortz's legion of mages, forcing Vilgefortz himself to flee. Meanwhile, Ciri and the Rats kidnap a young boy, whom they claim is part of a ransom scheme. Ciri saves them from city guards yet again, and word of her fighting prowess and savagery spreads, alarming Mistle and reaching Bonhart's ear, who interrogates and kills the surviving guard for information on Ciri. He later takes a doll from a girl that Ciri gifted the doll to. A furious Yennefer teleports to Emhyr's palace in Nilfgaard, hoping to free Ciri.
31	7	"What I Love I Do Not Carry"	Jeremy Webb	Clare Higgins	October 30, 2025
Milva reveals to the group that she is pregnant after an encounter with an elf in Brokilon before she joined the group. Geralt and the party later cross a swamp, but are derailed by two spirits, known as Rusalka, who kidnap several members of the party. Geralt successfully defeats them, and the party then meets up with Yennefer, who informs them that the Ciri in Nilfgaard is a fake. Geralt and his party decide to instead travel to a group of druids who Regis believes can track the real Ciri's whereabouts. Yarpen and Percival decide to leave the party and return to the dwarven capital, while Yennefer returns to Montecalvo. Emhyr, furious that the word of Teryn being the fake Ciri has gotten out, threatens to kill Skellen, but spares him as Skellen points out that Geralt, also being connected to Ciri by destiny, is a threat to Emhyr's prophecy. The Rats sell the boy they kidnapped to the merchant Hotspurn, who informs them of Bonhart's whereabouts. Furious, Ciri leaves The Rats to save the child, even as Mistle figures out she is Ciri and begs her to stay. Ciri easily dispatches Hotspurn outside the city, where he reveals to her that Bonhart is laying a trap for The Rats in order to kill them.
32	8	"Baptism of Fire"	Jeremy Webb	Mike Ostrowski	October 30, 2025
Geralt and his party commandeer a ferry to cross the river Yaruga only to be caught between Nilfgaardian and Northern soldiers on both sides of the river. Milva has a miscarriage and the group is forced to make landfall under a bridge. Geralt, Cahir, and Zoltan lead the Northern forces in defeating the Nilfgaardians and a monster as Regis and Jaskier care for Milva. After the battle, Geralt is knighted by Queen Meve of Lyria and Rivia, which makes him honour-bound to serve her. Yennefer inspires the surviving sorceresses to create their own Lodge before leaving in pursuit of Vilgefortz, tracking him through a portal that leads her into the middle of the ocean near a maelstrom. Vilgefortz kills his surviving followers for their cowardice. The Rats attempt to kill Bonhart, but he effortlessly butchers all of them. Arriving too late to save them, Ciri faces off against Bonhart but is defeated. Bonhart then decapitates the corpses of the Rats and takes Ciri captive. Desperate for Geralt's death to eliminate the threat to his prophecy, Emhyr procures a monster to find and kill him.

=== Season 5 ===
The episodes of the fifth season were written by:

1. Javier Grillo-Marxuach
2. Tera Vale Ragan
3. Troy Dangerfield
4. Clare Higgins & Rae Benjamin
5. Matthew D'Ambrosio
6. Tania Lotia
7. Mike Ostrowski
8. Lauren Schmidt Hissrich

== Production ==
=== Background ===
The Witcher book series by Andrzej Sapkowski was previously being developed as a live-action feature film by Platige Films and the Sean Daniel Company. Announced in November 2015, the film was intended to be directed by Tomasz Bagiński and written by Thania St. John, with a planned 2017 theatrical release. The film was to be based on elements from the short stories "The Witcher" and "The Lesser Evil" from The Last Wish, and was intended to serve as an introduction to the Witcher world and the beginning of a potential series of films. Bagiński hoped to shoot the film in Poland and/or Eastern Europe, with the project's budget estimated at between $20 and $30 million. In 2017, the feature-film project was reworked into an English-language television series after Platige Films and the Sean Daniel Company entered into discussions with Netflix. Bagiński later explained that the film project had gradually evolved into a television series, with Lauren Schmidt Hissrich joining the project and bringing ideas for adapting the material for television.

=== Development ===
In May 2017, Netflix announced the start of production on an English-language drama TV series based on the books. In December 2017, it was reported that Lauren Schmidt Hissrich would serve as showrunner on the show. In April 2018, Schmidt Hissrich revealed that the script for the pilot episode was finished and that the first season would be eight episodes long. In 2017, it was reported that Andrzej Sapkowski would serve as a creative consultant on the show, but in January 2018, Sapkowski denied any direct involvement. However, he met with Schmidt Hissrich in April 2018, and in May 2018, she stated that Sapkowski was on the creative team of the project. In August, Andrew Laws was revealed as production designer. In December, Radio Times reported directors Alik Sakharov and Charlotte Brändström had joined the project. Showrunner Lauren Schmidt Hissrich emphasized that the adaptation would remain faithful to Sapkowski's novels while introducing changes to structure for something that suited television storytelling better. This included the use of a nonlinear timeline within the first season to introduce Geralt, Yennefer, and Ciri. The first season adapts Sapkowski's short story collections, The Last Wish and Sword of Destiny, using them to world build and make foundations of characters before transitioning into the main saga.

Netflix announced a second season on November 13, 2019, under the working title "Mysterious Monsters", with production set to begin in London in early 2020, for a planned release in 2021. In April 2021, Netflix's co-chief executive officer and chief content officer, Ted Sarandos, confirmed that the second season was expected to premiere in Q4 2021. In July 2021, it was announced that the second season would premiere on December 17, 2021. On September 25, 2021, Netflix announced that the series had been renewed for a third season. In April 2023, it was announced that the third season would be split into two volumes, to be released on June 29 and July 27, 2023, respectively. In the midst of filming the fourth season, Netflix renewed the series for a fifth and final season in April 2024.

Due to the success of the main series, Netflix expanded the franchise with the animated film Nightmare of the Wolf (2021), centered on Vesemir, and the live-action prequel miniseries Blood Origin (2022), set over a thousand years before Geralt's time.

=== Writing ===
The first season was told in a non-linear manner, spanning different time periods. Schmidt Hissrich said this was inspired by Christopher Nolan's 2017 film Dunkirk. She pointed out that Yennefer's story covers around 70 years and Ciri's only about 2 weeks. Schmidt Hissrich also said that Yennefer and Cirilla were given more prominence to allow the viewers to understand them better. By showing their backstories, along with Geralt's, "we get down to the soul of the story. It's the story of a broken family. It's a story of three people who are on their own in the world, really orphans all living in the margins of society who are determined to not need anyone, and yet of course they do."

Schmidt Hissrich said the story for the second season will build on the foundations of the first season, becoming more focused; the characters will interact with each other more frequently. "When I talk about The Witcher, I always talk about how these three characters coming together — Geralt, Ciri, and Yennefer — they come together as a family. It's the most important part of the series for me," Schmidt Hissrich said. "And when you start to imagine someone's family, you also need to understand their family of origin. For Geralt, it's his brothers, it's the brotherhood of the witchers. So I'm really excited to get back in and meet Vesemir, his father figure, for the first time and all of these men that he was raised with since he was seven years old."

=== Casting ===
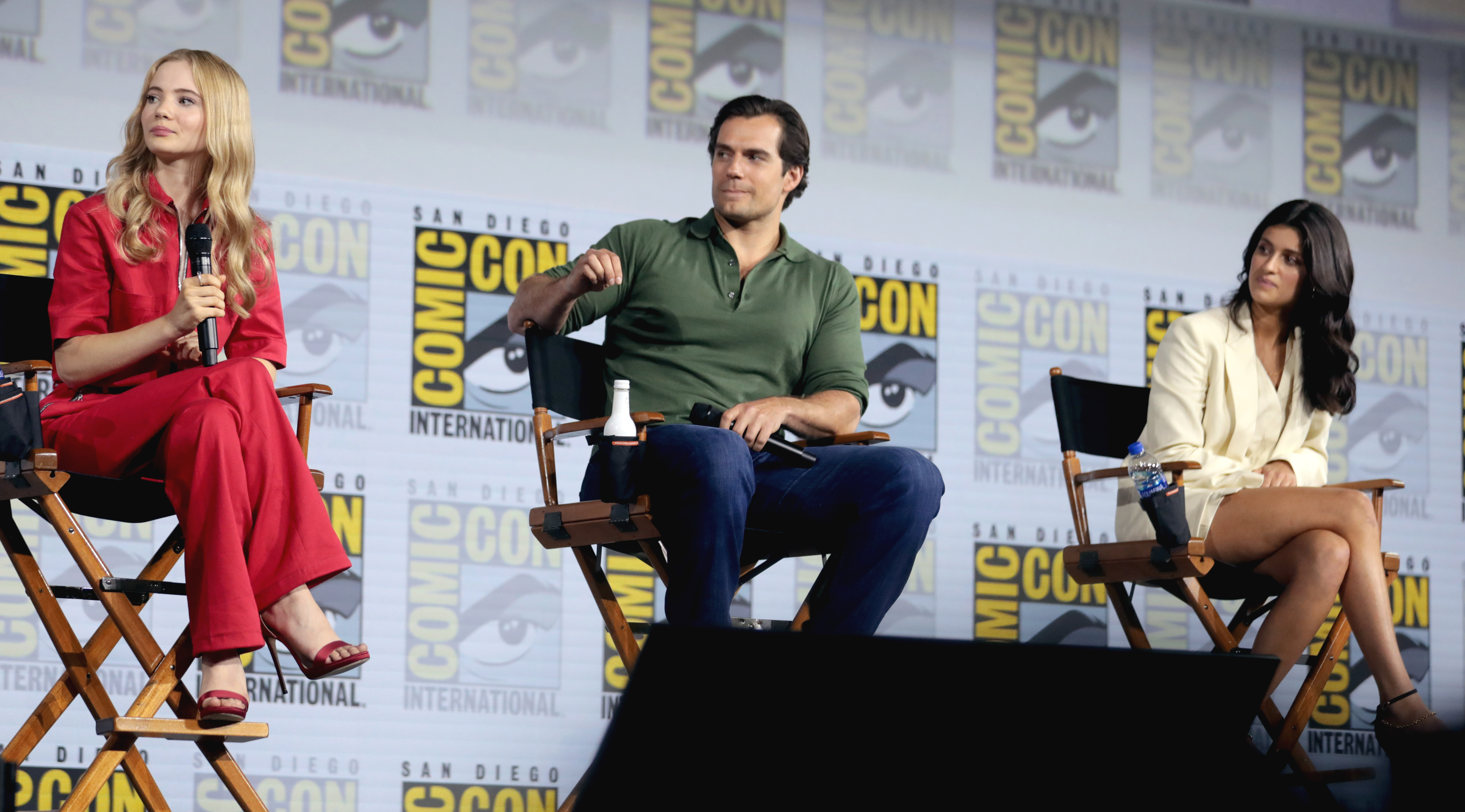
Freya Allan, Henry Cavill and Anya Chalotra at the 2019 San Diego Convention for The Witcher

In September 2018, Netflix announced that Henry Cavill would play Geralt of Rivia. He was selected from more than 200 actors; Cavill actively campaigned for the role, being a long-time fan of the video game adaptations, specifically The Witcher 3: Wild Hunt, though he read the books upon taking the role. In October 2018, Freya Allan and Anya Chalotra were cast as Princess Cirilla and Yennefer of Vengerberg respectively, while Jodhi May, Björn Hlynur Haraldsson, Adam Levy, MyAnna Buring, Mimi Ndiweni, and Therica Wilson-Read also joined. More casting was announced later that month, including Eamon Farren, Joey Batey, Lars Mikkelsen, Royce Pierreson, Maciej Musiał, Wilson Radjou-Pujalte, and Anna Shaffer.

In February 2020, Netflix announced Kim Bodnia had been cast as Vesemir, an experienced witcher and a mentor to Geralt. Other additions included Kristofer Hivju, Yasen Atour, Agnes Born, Paul Bullion, Thue Ersted Rasmussen, Aisha Fabienne Ross, and Mecia Simson. In September 2020, it was announced that Basil Eidenbenz would replace Rasmussen in the role of Eskel. In November 2020, Rebecca Hanssen was announced for the role of Queen Meve.

In March 2021, Kevin Doyle was cast as Ba'Lian, an original character who does not appear in the novels. Cassie Clare, Adjoa Andoh, Liz Carr, Simon Callow, Graham McTavish, and Chris Fulton were cast as Philippa Eilhart, Nenneke, Fenn, Codringher, Dijkstra, and Rience, respectively.

In April 2022, Robbie Amell, Meng'er Zhang, Hugh Skinner, and Christelle Elwin joined the cast in the third season with recurring roles. In July 2022, Michalina Olszańska, Ryan Hayes, Kate Winter, Martyn Ellis, Harvey Quinn, and Poppy Almond were cast.

In October 2022, Netflix announced that Liam Hemsworth would be replacing Henry Cavill as Geralt of Rivia from the fourth season onwards. In January 2024 it was announced that Laurence Fishburne was cast as Regis. Other actors joining the fourth season include Sharlto Copley, James Purefoy, Danny Woodburn, Linden Porco, Eve Ridley and Clive Russell.

The series' casting director is Sophie Holland.

=== Filming ===
In April 2018, Schmidt Hissrich revealed that the show would be filmed in Central and Eastern Europe.

Principal photography for the first season began on October 31, 2018, in Hungary. Much of the series was filmed at Mafilm Studios near Budapest; the outdoor set included the exterior of wizard Stregobor's household. The hall in Cintra was constructed at Origo Studios on the outskirts of Budapest. Fort Monostor (Monostori Erőd) and the nearby forest was used for some exterior scenes in Cintra. The Battle of Marnadal was filmed in the hills of a village in Hungary, Csákberény. The village that was Yennefer's original home was filmed at the Skanzen Village Museum, an open-air site near Szentendre some 30 kilometres (20 mi) north of Budapest; this location was also used in scenes with Ciri in an area with a windmill. The production used the exteriors of Burg Kreuzenstein, a castle near Leobendorf, Austria, for the abandoned fictional castle Vizima, but the interiors were filmed at Origo Studios.

In March 2019, production commenced on Gran Canaria, in the Canary Islands, Spain. Some scenes were to be shot on the islands of La Palma and La Gomera, as well. Scenes of the Sorcerers' Aretuza Academy (Tower of the Gull) were shot on Roque de Santo Domingo in Garafía, an islet, and enhanced with CGI. The interiors, however, used for the graduation ball were at the Kiscelli Museum in Óbuda. The museum was a monastery in the 18th century. This location was also used for the conclave of the Northern Mages. The Barranco de Fataga area on Gran Canaria island was used for some scenes of arid landscapes. Scenes of Ciri traveling in the desert were filmed in the Natural Dune Reserve of Maspalomas on Gran Canaria. Most of episode six was filmed on La Palma island.

Filming of the first season concluded in Ogrodzieniec Castle in Poland. The ruins of this medieval castle, dating from the 1300s, were the backdrop for scenes including the fictional Vilgefortz of Roggeveen and Triss Merigold. The ruins were also included when shooting the Battle of Sodden Hill in the final episode of Season 1. Filming for the first season wrapped in May 2019.

Filming for the second season began in Arborfield Studios, Berkshire, in early 2020 but was halted for two weeks in March due to concerns over the COVID-19 pandemic and actor Kristofer Hivju's confirmation that he had tested positive for COVID-19. Then, in May 2020, film and television productions that were filming in the UK were given permission to resume filming, including season two of The Witcher. The show resumed preproduction in July and officially resumed filming on August 12, 2020, with filming for the second season expected to extend into early 2021. On November 7, 2020, production was halted again after a number of crew members had tested positive for COVID-19. Production resumed two weeks later on November 24, 2020, and continued in December despite Cavill's on-set injury. Filming for the second season wrapped on April 2, 2021.

Filming locations for the second season were all in the UK and included Cathedral Cave and Hodge Close Quarry in the Lake District, Low Force Waterfall in the North Pennines, and Bourne Wood in Farnham.

Filming for the third season began on April 4, 2022, and wrapped in September. Part of the season was filmed at the Krk island in Croatia, with the help of the Croatian Audiovisual Centre (HAVC). Some of the scenes were filmed at the Fusine Lakes in Tarvisio, Italy, and at Predjama Castle and Nanos, both located in Slovenia.

The fourth season began filming in April 2024 at Longcross Studios in the UK and wrapped by the end of October.

The fifth season began filming by March 2025 in Cape Town, South Africa and wrapped in October.

=== Music ===
Sonya Belousova and Giona Ostinelli composed the soundtrack for the first season. The duo collaborated with several soloists and artists; the soundtrack features many medieval instruments to match the medieval-inspired setting of the series. More than 60 different instruments from around the world were used to create the soundtrack. The original song "Toss a Coin to Your Witcher", composed by Belousova and Ostinelli and sung by Batey in the second episode, became a viral hit shortly after the series's release. Users have created mods to patch the song into the video game adaptions of The Witcher. All violin solos for the series were performed by Lindsay Deutsch. In October 2021, it was confirmed that Joseph Trapanese would be scoring the soundtrack for the second season. Trapanese, having previously collaborated with Netflix as the composer for Shadow & Bone, replaced Belousova and Ostinelli. Showrunner Lauren Schmidt Hissrich also revealed that new songs performed by Batey would be featured on the soundtrack.

In June 2022, it was confirmed Trapanese would return to score the soundtrack for the third season. Besides new songs performed by Joey Batey, the score features a new song "A Little Sacrifice" performed by Freya Allan and inspired by a short story of the same name from The Sword of Destiny. Many songs also feature the Polish folk metal band Percival Schuttenbach who previously worked on the soundtrack for The Witcher 3: Wild Hunt.

== Marketing ==
Netflix released the first teaser for the series at San Diego Comic-Con on panel July 19, 2019. This teaser was hosted by Henry Cavill and showrunner Lauren Schmidt Hissrich. This promotion was also assisted by large-scale billboards in major cities, branded merchandise and interactive pieces like an immersive photo experience. The first full trailer was revealed at Lucca Comics & Games on October 31, 2019. Netflix released a final trailer on December 12, 2019. On October 29, 2021, Netflix released the official trailer for season 2. Season 3 was promoted through promotional material depicting Henry Cavill to create an emotional hook due to it being his last season in the show.

== Release ==
In April 2019, Netflix's Ted Sarandos told investors in an earnings call that the series would be released in late 2019. The series premiered on December 20, 2019. The second season premiered on December 17, 2021. The third season was released in two volumes, with the first five episodes premiering on June 29 and the last three episodes on July 27, 2023, respectively. The fourth season was released on October 30, 2025.

=== Specials ===
On August 26, 2020, a making-of about the first season of the show titled Making The Witcher was released on Netflix. On September 2, 2020, the making-of series The Witcher: A Look Inside the Episodes premiered on Netflix.

With the release of the second season, Netflix released on December 17, 2021, Making The Witcher: Season 2, The Witcher Bestiary Season 1, Part 1, The Witcher Bestiary Season 1, Part 2, The Characters of the Continent, and The Witcher: Fireplace.

On July 27, 2023, along with the third season's second-part premiere, Netflix released the making-of special Making The Witcher: Season 3.

== Reception ==
=== Critical reception ===
Critical response of The Witcher
Season	Rotten Tomatoes	Metacritic
1	68% (92 reviews)	54 (18 reviews)
2	95% (64 reviews)	69 (23 reviews)
3	79% (47 reviews)	71 (14 reviews) 65 (7 reviews)
4	59% (27 reviews)	59 (15 reviews)

==== Season 1 ====
Rotten Tomatoes collected 91 reviews of the first season and identified 68% of them as positive, with an average rating of 6.26/10. The website's critics’ consensus reads: "Though the world of The Witcher at times feels only half-formed, Henry Cavill brings brawny charisma to a series teeming with subversive fantasy elements and dark humor." Metacritic calculated a weighted-average score of 54 out of 100 based on reviews by 17 critics, indicating "mixed or average reviews".

In a positive review of the first season, Erik Kain of Forbes wrote, "If you're looking for an original dark fantasy with some horror elements, some bare skin and plenty of blood and gore (and monsters), look no further", while James Whitbrook of io9 wrote, "if you are willing to sit through those trudging opening episodes, punctuated by a cool fight here or an intriguing character scene there, The Witcher slowly but surely finds itself a fantastical slice of bloody, schlocky fun." Conversely, Entertainment Weekly critic Darren Franich wrote, "My destiny is to never watch this borefest ever again", awarding the first season an F rating. Franich drew criticism when he admitted to having watched only the first, second, and fifth episodes. Raisa Bruner of Time gave the show a positive review, commenting, "Each episode gets stronger as the season progresses, and ultimately satisfies the fantasy itch." Scott Bryan, of the BBC, was more negative towards the show, criticizing it for relying too much on the gameplays, and for not knowing how to properly adapt the novels’ material for television. Critic William Hughes of The A.V. Club commented, in a positive review, "The Witcher is by no means perfect; even ignoring the earlier structural flaws, its efforts at comedy often come off sounding a bit too modern for the rest of its setting, and the characters' tendency to monologue to any unspeaking object or person they can find—horses, mute companions, literal dead babies—verges on comedic. But when the worst thing you can say about a series is that every episode ends up being better than the one that preceded it, that leaves an exciting amount of room to grow."

The Witcher author Andrzej Sapkowski commented favorably about the show, writing, "I was more than happy with Henry Cavill's appearance as the Witcher. He's a real professional. Just as Viggo Mortensen gave his face to Aragorn (in The Lord of the Rings), so Henry gave his to Geralt — and it shall be forever so." Sapkowski added, "I shall be happy if the viewers — and readers — take anything away, anything that shall enrich them in some way. Also, I sincerely hope to leave the viewers — and readers — hot. In every sense. Not tepid, not lukewarm." Author Tom Long from The Detroit News praised the series for its action sequences and performances, and gave the show a B rating. Matthew Aguilar, of ComicBook.com, had a positive response, rating the show a 4 out of 5: "The Witcher brings the world's rich characters, sharp wit, and stylish action to life in a truly delightful way, and whether you're a fan of the novels or the games, you're going to find something to love." Critic Daniel D'Addario was more negative about the show, writing, "This is a show with moments of drama and of gruesome violence cut through with a glancing humor that too often feels tossed-off and out-of-place in the world the show has created."

==== Season 2 ====
The second season received positive reviews. Rotten Tomatoes reports a 95% approval rating with an average rating of 7.9/10, based on 62 reviews. The website's critical consensus reads, "The Witcher's second season expands on its first in all the best ways—and most importantly, it remains a whole lot of fun." Metacritic calculated a weighted average score of 69 out of 100 based on 23 critics, indicating "generally favorable reviews".

Critic Sheena Scott from Forbes favorably commented: "Throughout the episodes, characters repeatedly point out their resemblance—a similar attitude, the same hairstyle—to keep on reminding the viewers of their daughter-father bond. But as the ending of Season 2 indicates, it looks like it is this very bond that may be put into jeopardy in the next season." Angie Han from The Hollywood Reporter, praised the series for being an improvement over its previous season, although it may not be perfect. She commented: "In its second outing, The Witcher feels confident enough to open itself up to that whole array of feelings." In a more negative review, Roxana Hadadi from Vulture stated, "In its second season, The Witcher is most engaging when exploring the alliances and allegiances between Geralt, Yennefer, and Ciri and when using those three to consider Nivellen's insistence that 'Monsters are born of deeds alone. Unforgivable ones.' But in its attempt to build a bigger world, the series falls prey to more fantasy tropes than it masters." Author Leigh Butler deemed the second season an improvement over its previous season, praising its deeper themes, better storyline, performances, and finally approaching its potential, and stated, "Season 2 (so far) is better, and working its way toward potentially great. When it comes down to it, there is really only one thing any story needs to accomplish, and The Witcher has accomplished it."

James Whitbrook from io9 said, "The new focus on character-building might mean less focus on specific short stories from Sapkowski's collection of Witcher tales, but it makes the show's world feel more expansive and nuanced in ways it didn't until late in the show's first season, while still keeping things centered on the characters as the sense of scale expands." Nick Schagerw stated in a negative review, "Even by typical fantasy-genre standards, the show indulges in so much make-believe terminology, and at such an incessant clip, that it quickly proves easier to give up trying to make heads or tails of every detail and instead just go with the wonky narrative flow", while Allison Keene from Paste commented in a positive review, "More than anything though, The Witcher's excellent Season 2 is a deeper dive into a rich world that shines in its focus on Ciri and Geralt's relationship, and how that connection influences everything around them. Though there are plenty of things to quibble over from book to screen (or from videogame screen, although the show is expressly pulled from the page), The Witcher is perhaps best viewed and accepted as a fresh translation of an old fable." Critic Carly Lane from Collider gave positive feedback: "By comparison, Season 2 is finally settling into its stride and has an even better sense of what works while discarding more of what didn't — although there are still the occasional unannounced time-jumps forward, or surprise character introductions, that demand attentiveness rather than any distracted background viewing."

==== Season 3 ====
For the third season, Rotten Tomatoes reports a 79% approval rating with an average rating of 7.1/10, based on 47 reviews. The website's critical consensus reads, "Capably shouldered by Henry Cavill's gruff charm, The Witcher's plotty third season pays a fittingly fond farewell to this particular Geralt of Rivia." Metacritic calculated a weighted average score of 71 out of 100 based on 14 critics for the first five episodes and a score of 65 out of 100 based on 7 critics for the last three, both indicating "generally favorable reviews".

==== Season 4 ====
For the fourth season, Rotten Tomatoes reports a 59% approval rating based on 27 reviews. The website's critical consensus reads, "While Geralt of Rivia gets a new face, The Witcher overall is beginning to grow stale in a fourth season that dutifully sets up the series' endgame without having enough fun along the way." Metacritic calculated a weighted-average score of 59 out of 100 based on reviews by 15 critics, indicating "mixed or average reviews".

=== Audience viewership ===
According to Parrot Analytics, The Witcher, in its US debut, was the third most "in demand" original streaming series, behind Stranger Things and The Mandalorian. Parrot's process measures "demand expressions", which is their "globally standardized TV-demand measurement unit that reflects the desire, engagement, and viewership of a series weighted by importance." On December 31, 2019, Parrot Analytics reported that The Witcher became the most-in-demand TV series in the world, across all platforms.

On December 30, 2019, Netflix issued a number of official lists, including the Most Popular TV Shows of 2019. The series was among the most viewed in the U.S. market, where The Witcher was ranked second among series. On January 21, 2020, Netflix announced that the first season had been viewed by over 76 million viewers on its service within its first month of release. Netflix had recently changed its viewership metric, from 70% of an episode under the previous metric, down to two minutes under the new metric. The new metric gives viewing figures 35% higher on average than the previous one. The 76 million views in its first month based on the new metric (at least two minutes or more) is the largest for a Netflix series launch since the introduction of the new viewership metric.

The Witcher was, until the release of Bridgerton and Squid Game, Netflix's most watched original series launch at the time, with 541 million hours viewed in the first 28 days of release, and season two achieved 484 million hours watched.

Upon the release of the first batch of episodes for the third season, it was reported that the show had experienced a 30% drop in viewership compared to the previous season that finished airing about 1.5 years earlier.

PlumResearch data reported by Media Play News showed that season three of The Witcher drew approximately 5.7 million unique viewers and 15.1 million hours watched on Netflix during the week of 26 June to 2 July 2023.

Sales of The Witcher 3: Wild Hunt in December 2019 were 554% greater than those from December 2018, attributed to renewed interest in the series due to the show.

=== Accolades ===
Year	Award	Category	Nominee(s)	Result	Ref.
2020	British Society of Cinematographers	Best Cinematography in a Television Drama	Gavin Struthers	Nominated	
2020	Dragon Awards	Best Science Fiction or Fantasy TV Series	Lauren Schmidt Hissrich	Nominated	
2020	Webby Awards	Video – Trailer People's Voice	Lucy Bond, Jed Finkelstein, Oleg Loginov, and Rebecca Salt	Won	
2021	BMI Film & TV Awards	BMI Streaming Series Award	Sonya Belousova	Won	
2021	Hollywood Music In Media Awards	Best Main Title Theme – TV Show/Limited Series	Sonya Belousova and Giona Ostinelli	Nominated	
2021	Hollywood Music In Media Awards	Best Original Song in a TV Show/Limited Series	Sonya Belousova, Giona Ostinelli, and Jenny Klein	Nominated	
2021	Saturn Awards	Best Fantasy Television Series	The Witcher	Nominated	
2021	Saturn Awards	Best Actor on Television	Henry Cavill	Nominated	
2021	Saturn Awards	Best Performance by a Younger Actor in a Television Series	Freya Allan	Nominated	
2022	Art Directors Guild Awards	Excellence in Production Design for a One-Hour Period or Fantasy Single-Camera Series	Andrew Laws (for "A Grain of Truth")	Nominated	
2022	British Academy Television Craft Awards	Best Make-Up & Hair Design	Barrie Gower, Sarah Gower and Deb Watson	Won	
2022	British Academy Television Craft Awards	Best Sound: Fiction	James Bain, Robert Farr, Matthew Collinge, Matt Davies, Alyn Sclosa, and Rob Prynne	Nominated	
2022	British Academy Television Craft Awards	Best Special, Visual & Graphic Effects	Oliver Cubbage, Dadi Einarsson, Jet Omoshebi, Aleksandar Pejic, Stefano Pepin, and Gavin Round	Won	
2022	Costume Designers Guild Awards	Excellence in Sci-Fi/Fantasy Television	Lucinda Wright (for "Family")	Nominated	
2022	Critics' Choice Super Awards	Best Science Fiction/Fantasy Series	The Witcher	Nominated	
2022	Critics' Choice Super Awards	Best Actor in a Science Fiction/Fantasy Series	Henry Cavill	Nominated	
2022	Golden Reel Awards	Outstanding Achievement in Sound Editing – Series 1 Hour – Comedy or Drama – Sound Effects and Foley	Matthew Collinge, Rob Turner, Alyn Sclosa, Rob Prynne, Adam Oakley, Rob Weatherall, Zoe Freed, and Rebecca Heathcote (for "A Grain of Truth")	Won	
2022	Golden Reel Awards	Outstanding Achievement in Sound Editing – Series 1 Hour – Comedy or Drama – Music	Arabella Winter (for "A Grain of Truth")	Nominated	
2022	Hollywood Critics Association TV Awards	Best Actor in a Streaming Series, Drama	Henry Cavill	Nominated	
2022	Make-Up Artists and Hair Stylists Guild Awards	Best Special Makeup Effects in Television, Limited/Miniseries, or New Media Series	Barrie Gower and Deb Watson	Nominated	
2022	Primetime Creative Arts Emmy Awards	Outstanding Fantasy/Sci-Fi Costumes	Lucinda Wright and Rebecca Jempson (for "Family")	Nominated	
2022	Primetime Creative Arts Emmy Awards	Outstanding Special Visual Effects in a Season or a Movie	Dadi Einarsson, Gavin Round, Bruno Baron, Matthias Bjarnason, Sebastien Francoeur, Aleksandar Pejic, Oliver Cubbage, Mateusz Tokarz, and Stefano Pepin	Nominated	
2022	Primetime Creative Arts Emmy Awards	Outstanding Stunt Coordination for a Drama Series, Limited or Anthology Series or Movie	Adam Horton	Nominated	
2022	Saturn Awards	Best Fantasy Series (Streaming)	The Witcher	Nominated	
2022	Visual Effects Society Awards	Outstanding Animated Character in an Episode or Real-Time Project	Hannes Faupel, Stéphane Paccolat, Ivan Cadena Ayala, and Laurent Fortin (for " Leshy Eskel; Tree Branch Creature")	Nominated	
2022	Visual Effects Society Awards	Outstanding Animated Character in an Episode or Real-Time Project	Marko Chulev, Rasely Ma, Mike Beaulieu, and Robin Witzsche (for "Nivellen the Cursed Man")	Won	
2024	British Academy Television Craft Awards	Best Sound: Fiction	Matthew Collinge, James Bain, Robert Farr, Tom Melling, Matt Davies, Alyn Sclosa	Nominated	
2024	British Academy Television Craft Awards	Best Special, Visual and Graphic Effects	Tim Crosbie, Caimin Bourne, Jet Omoshebi, Dan Weir, Cinesite, David Stephens	Won	

== Spin-offs ==
=== Films ===
In January 2020, Netflix announced an animated spin-off film titled The Witcher: Nightmare of the Wolf, focusing on the origin story of Geralt's mentor and fellow witcher Vesemir. Lauren Schmidt Hissrich and Beau DeMayo worked on the film, with production by Studio Mir. It was released on August 23, 2021.

On September 25, 2021, a second animated feature film was announced. In November 2023, it was announced that the film would be titled The Witcher: Sirens of the Deep and would be based on the short story "A Little Sacrifice" from Sword of Destiny. Studio Mir will return to produce the film, which will be written by series writers Mike Ostrowski and Rae Benjamin, produced by Lauren Schmidt Hissrich, and directed by Kang Hei Chul who served as a storyboard artist on Nightmare of the Wolf. It was released on February 11, 2025.

A feature-length special titled The Rats: A Witcher Tale was released alongside the fourth season of The Witcher on October 30, 2025. It focuses on the eponymous young gang of street criminals undertaking a dangerous heist prior to them encountering Ciri during their first appearance in the third season. While those who portrayed the Rats, Freya Allan, and Sharlto Copley reprise their roles, the character of Brehen is portrayed by Dolph Lundgren.

=== Series ===
A live-action prequel limited series, The Witcher: Blood Origin, was announced by Netflix in July 2020. Set 1200 years before Geralt's time, it shows the origin of the Witchers. Schmidt Hissrich developed the prequel as executive producer, and Declan de Barra served as showrunner. In July 2021, Michelle Yeoh and Sophia Brown joined the cast. Filming began in August 2021 in the United Kingdom, with Lenny Henry, Mirren Mack, Nathaniel Curtis, Dylan Moran, Jacob Collins-Levy, Lizzie Annis, Huw Novelli, Francesca Mills, Amy Murray, Zach Wyatt, Minnie Driver, Aidan O'Callaghan and Mark Rowley joining the cast. The series premiered on December 25, 2022, and consists of four episodes.
