= Paloceras =

Eyewear brand founded in 2022

- Type: Private
- Industry: Eyewear
- Founded: 2022
- Founders: Mika Matikainen; Alexis Perron-Corriveau
- Headquarters: Helsinki, Finland
- Number of locations: Lisbon (design studio); London (atelier)
- Products: Eyewear; sunglasses; optical frames; silk scarves; accessories

Paloceras is an independent European eyewear brand founded in 2022 by Finnish designer Mika Matikainen and Canadian designer Alexis Perron-Corriveau. The company is headquartered in Helsinki, with a design studio in Lisbon and an atelier in London.

== History ==
Originating in the Geneva region and later headquartered in Helsinki, the company was founded in 2022 after Matikainen and Perron-Corriveau met while studying at ECAL in Switzerland.

In 2025, the brand opened a MicroFactory in Helsinki for 3D-printed eyewear production, supported by a grant from the Finnish government. The facility combines digital design, 3D printing and hand finishing.

In 2025, Paloceras was featured in fashion and design media including Numéro Switzerland, Vogue Portugal and the Financial Times. In January 2026, Paloceras designed eyewear for Robert Wun's Spring–Summer 2026 haute couture presentation in Paris. Vogue Italia noted that the brand was involved from the early creative stages of the collection, with the eyewear conceived as an integral part of the looks. The pieces were also documented in runway coverage by WWD.In March 2026, the brand won the Best Sun Style – Independent category at the NOW Awards during Vision Expo in Orlando, Florida.

== Collections ==
The first collection, Pebble, featured rounded acetate frames noted for their inflated contours and colour compositions reminiscent of sculpted glass.

In 2025, Paloceras collaborated with former French international footballer Djibril Cissé on Marble Spectacle, a limited edition of 40 pairs per colourway in marbled acetate. A second collaboration, Leopard Lace, followed in January 2026 as a numbered limited edition of 90 pieces per model.

Also in 2025, the brand unveiled Hydroceras, a 3D-printed design described by Œ Magazine as "liquid frozen in time."

In January 2026, Paloceras released Nouvelle Fiction, a collection of lightweight optical frames adapted from the sculptural design language of the Pebble line.

== Reception ==
Paloceras has received coverage in international fashion, lifestyle and design publications. The Financial Times profiled co-founder Mika Matikainen and his Helsinki studio in 2025. Harper's Bazaar included the Pebble model in its selection of best sunglasses for women, and Marie Claire featured the brand in a 2025 fashion editorial. The brand has also been featured in Rolling Stone UK, Vogue Italia, Vogue Portugal, Vanity Fair Italia, Numéro Switzerland, Town & Country, Refinery29, InStyle, NYLON and Esquire, as well as trade outlets including Eyestylist, Optical Journal and Vision Monday.

Paloceras eyewear has appeared in editorial shoots with actor Ben Radcliffe for LE MILE Magazine and singer Cian Ducrot for Square Mile.

== Founders ==
Mika Matikainen is a Finnish designer whose Helsinki home and studio were profiled by the Financial Times in 2025. Alexis Perron-Corriveau is a Canadian eyewear designer. Both studied at ECAL's Master of Advanced Studies in Design for Luxury and Craftsmanship programme.

== See also ==
- List of eyewear brands
