= The Witcher: Nightmare of the Wolf =

2021 film by Kwang Il Han

- Official release poster
- Directed by: Kwang Il Han
- Screenplay by: Beau DeMayo
- Based on: The Witcher by Andrzej Sapkowski
- Produced by: Lauren Schmidt Hissrich
- Starring: Theo James; Lara Pulver; Mary McDonnell; Graham McTavish
- Music by: Brian D'Oliveira
- Production companies: Studio Mir; Little Schmidt Productions; Platige Image; Hivemind
- Distributed by: Netflix
- Release date: August 23, 2021
- Running time: 83 minutes
- Countries: South Korea; United States; Poland
- Language: English

The Witcher: Nightmare of the Wolf is a 2021 adult animated dark fantasy film for Netflix, produced by Lauren Schmidt Hissrich, and starring Theo James, Lara Pulver, Graham McTavish, and Mary McDonnell. The film serves as a spin-off of the Netflix series The Witcher. It focuses on the origin story of Geralt's mentor and fellow witcher Vesemir. The film premiered on August 23, 2021.

== Plot ==
In 1165, the witcher Vesemir saves a child from a leshen in the forests of Kaedwen. Before dying, the creature says something in an archaic elven dialect to Vesemir, leading him to suspect that it was under someone's control. Vesemir is visited by the elf Filavandrel, who thinks the leshen was controlled by Kitsu, one of many elven girls who have gone missing. Meanwhile, the sorceress Tetra Gilcrest, an advisor to the Kaedwen king, argues that witchers should be outlawed and hunted down, but the elderly courtier Lady Zerbst is sympathetic to the witchers and speaks in their favor.

Vesemir reminisces about his youth when he, along with his best friend Illyana, were servants for a noble whose mistress was saved from a mahr by a witcher named Deglan with Vesemir's help. Enticed by promises of fortune and desiring to make a name for himself, Vesemir traveled to Kaer Morhen and underwent the training and mutations to become a witcher.

In the present day, Vesemir and his fellow witcher, Luka, are arrested for killing two Kaedwani knights in a bar fight. Lady Zerbst persuades the king to send Vesemir, accompanied by Tetra to rid the forest of Kitsu. She personally delivers the mission order to Vesemir, who recognizes her as Illyana. Vesemir and Tetra set out and she tells him the story of a young sorceress wrongfully killed by a witcher as part of a con, an act which convinced her that witchers are too powerful and cannot be trusted. They find Kitsu, mutated and now able to cast powerful illusions, and fight her basilisk. They kill the monster, but Kitsu escapes.

Following Kitsu, the pair come across an old and abandoned elven school where they find the bodies of the other missing female elves. They rescue the captured Filavandrel, who explains that Kitsu tried to replicate the experiments that were done on her, and they come to the conclusion that corrupt witchers are responsible, wanting to terrorize the locals into hiring them. Vesemir surmises that the monsters he encountered were probably created in Kaer Morhen and leaves to confront Deglan, who has risen to a high position of leadership. As he departs, Tetra destroys Kitsu's den, finds Kitsu later surveying the destruction, and blames the witchers. Back at court, she reveals the witchers' culpability, and is granted use of the Kaedwani army to lay siege to Kaer Morhen. Illyana sees a captured Luka being put to death and flees to warn Vesemir.

Deglan admits to Vesemir to creating the monsters, including Kitsu, to protect their way of life and are alerted by Illyana of Tetra's assault, which is assisted by Kitsu's monsters. Illyana helps the witcher recruits flee into the mountains. Vesemir confronts Tetra, who has captured the order's mages and is holding them hostage. Kitsu arrives and traps him in an illusion where he never became a witcher, instead having a family with Illyana. However, Vesemir is able to break out of the illusion and engages in a fierce battle with Tetra and her forces. He seemingly kills Tetra and Kitsu, only to realize that Tetra had deceived him with another illusion, killing the mages to destroy the knowledge of creating witchers and mortally wounding Illyana.

Tetra reveals she is the daughter of the sorceress killed by the witcher from her story before the dying Deglan strikes her down. Knowing that the recruits are still alive, he urges Vesemir to guide and watch over them as the new leader. At the behest of Illyana, Vesemir allows Kitsu to flee with her life. Vesemir takes Illyana to a lake, where she always dreamed of living. The two share a brief moment before she peacefully passes away. He then sets out and catches up to the recruits, including a young Geralt, with the understanding that they are the last of their kind.

== Voice cast ==
- Theo James as Vesemir
  - David Errigo Jr. as Young Vesemir
- Mary McDonnell as Lady Illyana Zerbst
  - Jennifer Hale as Young Illyana
- Lara Pulver as Tetra Gilcrest
- Graham McTavish as Deglan
- Tom Canton as Filavandrel
- Kari Wahlgren as Kitsu
- Matt Yang King as Luka, Skogar
  - Jennie Kwan as Young Luka
- Darryl Kurylo as Sven, Nobleman
  - A.J. LoCascio as Young Sven
- Keith Ferguson as Lord Carlisle, Reidrich
- Michaela Dietz as Tomas
- Harry Hissrich as Young Geralt
- Adam Croasdell as King Dagread, Nobleman
- Nolan North as Handsome Knight, Vendor, Bevin
- Samia Mounts as Midwife, Priestess
- Luke Youngblood as Sugo
- Steve Blum as Leshy
- Dee Bradley Baker as Assorted Creatures

Additional voices by Sara Cravens, JP Karliak, Andrew Morgado, Fred Tatasciore, Courtenay Taylor, and Abby Trott.

== Production ==
In January 2020, Netflix announced that an animated film adaptation of The Witcher was in the works from Korean animation studio Studio Mir. Writer Beau DeMayo explained that the team chose to make the film animated rather than live-action because it presented them with some "exciting" storytelling possibilities. The film uses a mix of both traditional and computer-generated animation. When designing Vesemir, animation director Han Kwang Il believed he "shouldn't be too handsome, but he had to be quite good-looking and appealing because he's the main character". For a majority of the character designs, the team aimed for a "European/American style", with the exception of Tetra, whose design fell in more closely with a "Japanese style".

== Release ==
During the virtual WitcherCon event in July 2021, a "Date Announcement" teaser was released. A teaser trailer was released on July 21, followed by the full trailer on August 9. The film was released on August 23, 2021.

== Reception ==
On the review aggregator website Rotten Tomatoes, 100% of 27 critics' reviews are positive, with an average rating of 7.1/10. The website's consensus reads: "Focusing on the adventures of a strapping young Vesemir, Nightmare of the Wolf is a fluidly animated addendum to the Witcher story that will delight fans with its swashbuckling action." Metacritic, which uses a weighted average, assigned the film a score of 67 out of 100, based on 5 critics, indicating "generally favorable" reviews.

The film was nominated for Best Animated Special Production at the 49th Annie Awards.

== See also ==
- The Witcher: Nightmare of the Wolf (soundtrack)
