= Fackham Hall =

- Theatrical release poster
- Directed by: Jim O'Hanlon
- Written by: Steve Dawson Andrew Dawson Tim Inman; Jimmy Carr; Patrick Carr
- Produced by: Danny Perkins; Kris Thykier; Mila Cottray
- Starring: Thomasin McKenzie; Ben Radcliffe; Katherine Waterston; Emma Laird; Tom Goodman-Hill; Anna Maxwell Martin; Sue Johnston; Tom Felton; Damian Lewis
- Cinematography: Philipp Blaubach
- Edited by: Colin Fair
- Music by: David Arnold; Oli Julian
- Production companies: Elysian Film Group; Archery Pictures; Two & Two Pictures
- Distributed by: Bleecker Street (United States); Entertainment Film Distributors (United Kingdom)
- Release dates: December 5, 2025 (United States); December 12, 2025 (United Kingdom)
- Running time: 97 minutes
- Countries: United Kingdom; United States
- Language: English
- Box office: $4.8 million

Fackham Hall is a 2025 period comedy film directed by Jim O'Hanlon and co-written by Jimmy Carr, Patrick Carr, and the Dawson Brothers. The film stars Thomasin McKenzie, Ben Radcliffe, Katherine Waterston, Emma Laird, Tom Goodman-Hill, Anna Maxwell Martin, Sue Johnston, Tom Felton, and Damian Lewis.

Fackham Hall was released in the United States by Bleecker Street on 5 December 2025, and in the United Kingdom by Entertainment Film Distributors on 12 December 2025.

== Plot ==
The Davenports have been owners of the large manor house known as Fackham Hall for generations, but patriarch Lord Humphrey Davenport has no surviving male heir. The Davenports' younger daughter Poppy is due to marry her paternal first cousin, Archibald, which will keep the Hall in the family. Thief and orphan Eric Noone is given a message to deliver to Lord Davenport, but when he arrives he is presumed to be an applicant for a hall boy position and takes the job, forgetting about the letter. At the wedding between Poppy and Archibald, the vicar displays a habit of poorly timed punctuations in his sermons. Suddenly, Poppy flees the church, declaring her love for local manure salesman, Lionel. Lady Davenport pushes her other daughter Rose to marry Archibald, but she is repulsed by his chauvinistic manner and is instead attracted to Eric, and the two spend the night together.

Lord Davenport is found dead in the morning. Inspector Watt arrives and determines that one of the wedding guests in the house likely committed the crime. Eric is accused after he is discovered to have robbed Lord Davenport's desk, but he refuses to use Rose as his alibi. He is arrested and thrown in jail, while Rose reluctantly agrees to marry Archibald to save Fackham Hall.

In jail, Eric re-discovers the letter previously given to him and reads it, learning that he is the long-lost child of Lord Davenport's brother, thus a cousin of the Davenports and the rightful heir to Fackham Hall. He escapes confinement, intending to head to the church to stop Rose's wedding to Archibald, but is stopped by Mrs McAllister, Fackham Hall's housekeeper, who reveals that she framed Eric for the murder. She was having an affair with Lord Davenport, and during an argument about him firing their manservants/illegitimate children and replacing them with Eric, Lord Davenport had accidentally stabbed himself with his penknife, leading to Mrs McAllister trying to shoot the penknife (with Lord Davenport accidentally drinking poison by mistake, believing it to be ‘liquid courage’), pouring acid onto his chest to dissolve the bullets and strangling him in an attempt to save his life. Inspector Watt overhears the confession and arrests Mrs McAllister, and Eric reveals his true parentage. Though Archibald attempts to shoot his long-lost elder brother, he misses and is taken away, and Eric and Rose marry instead.

The epilogue reveals that Archibald tried to commit suicide by shooting himself in the head but missed; Poppy, breaking family tradition, married her second cousin after rejecting 22 grooms; Lady Davenport spent the rest of her life campaigning for the repealing of women's right to vote; the vicar died in a bunker in Berlin in April 1945; Eric and Rose went on honeymoon in Blackpool; and Lord Davenport remained dead.

== Cast ==
- Thomasin McKenzie as Rose Davenport
- Hayley Mills as Narrator/Rose Davenport-Noone
- Ben Radcliffe as Eric Noone/Nathaniel Davenport
- Damian Lewis as Humphrey, Lord Davenport
- Katherine Waterston as Prudence, Lady Davenport
- Emma Laird as Poppy Davenport
- Lizzie Hopley as Phyllis Davenport
- Tom Felton as Archibald Davenport
- Tom Goodman-Hill as Inspector Watt
- Anna Maxwell Martin as Mrs Edna McAllister
- Sue Johnston as Great Aunt Bonaparte
- Jason Done as J. R. R. Tolkien
- Tim McMullan as Cyril
- Ramon Tikaram as Darvesh Khalid
- John Thomson as Bill Bobaggins
- Ian Bartholomew as Austin Blaine
- Karen Henthorn as Sister Jude
- Jimmy Carr as Vicar
- Adam Woodward as Bert Chester
- Nathan McMullen as Alexander
- Erin Austen as Mary and Constance Bechdel
- Lily Knight as Fifi Valentine
- Magdalena Sverlander as Rose Seller
- Laurie Ogden as Patricia
- Paula Wharton as Mrs Kitchen
- Gemma Wardle as Gladys
- Shaun Mason as Army Officer

== Production ==
Fackham Hall is a parody of traditional period dramas like Downton Abbey (2010) and Gosford Park (2001). Comedian and screenwriter Jimmy Carr said Fackham Hall was a mashup of period drama and comedy.

Principal photography began in Yorkshire in November 2024 and was completed in late 2024. Additional cast members announced were Damian Lewis, Ben Radcliffe and Tom Felton. Additional filming was done at Knowsley Hall in Liverpool and Thornton Hough, Wirral.

David Arnold was hired to compose two original songs and the score. Arnold also received a "music by" credit in the film, while Oli Julian is credited as a "composer".

== Release ==
Fackham Hall was released in the United States by Bleecker Street on 5 December 2025, and in the United Kingdom by Entertainment Film Distributors on 12 December.

It was released on HBO Max in the US on 2 March 2026, and immediately went to number one on the streaming service

It began streaming on Amazon Prime in the UK on 12 September 2026 and went straight to number two across all movies.

== Critical reception ==
The film is Certified Fresh on Rotten Tomatoes.

On the review aggregator website Rotten Tomatoes, 74% of 62 critics' reviews are positive, with an average rating of 5.9/10. The website's consensus reads: "With a gleefully affectionate tone, Fackham Hall barrels through a dizzying amount of story and nonstop gags, occasionally overwhelming itself but ultimately winning out through its fearless comic spirit." Metacritic, which uses a weighted average, assigned the film a score of 54 out of 100, based on 11 critics, indicating "mixed or average" reviews.
