= Csákberény =

- Location of Csákberény
- Coordinates: 47.34588°N 18.33004°E
- Country: Hungary
- County: Fejér

Area
  - Total: 41.37 km^{2} (15.97 sq mi)

Population (2001)
  - Total: 1,242
  - Density: 30.02/km^{2} (77.8/sq mi)
- Time zone: UTC+1 (CET)
  - Summer (DST): UTC+2 (CEST)
- Postal code: 8072
- Area code: 22
- Website: www.csakbereny.hu

Csákberény is a village in Fejér County, Hungary.

Some outdoor scenes for The Witcher TV series, particularly the fictional Battle of Marnadal, were filmed in the hills of this village. Since around 2016, the village has been home to a decommissioned Soviet Ev/A metro car, which was painted by the sculptor Ildikó Zsemlye.

== Film ==
- Dune: Messiah: Filmed on the dolomite hills of Csákberény, where the striking terrain perfectly captures the otherworldly, monumental landscape of the planet Arrakis.
- Halo (Sci-Fi series, Season 2): Shot at the foot of the Csákberény hills.
- The Witcher (Season 1): The Battle of Marnadal was filmed across the hills and rolling slopes surrounding Csákberény.
- Asterix & Obelix: God Save Britannia: The battle scene of this comedy feature was also filmed in Csákberény.
