= Steve Gaub =

American TV Film Producer

Steve Gaub is an American television and film producer. He is an active member of the Producers Guild of America. He is an Executive Producer of the television series The Witcher.

== Life and career ==
Steve graduated from the University of Minnesota Carlson School of Management with BS degrees in Marketing and Operations Management Systems.

He began his film career working in Minneapolis and Los Angeles in the independent film industry, as an Assistant Director and Production Manager. He moved into Script Development at Outlaw Productions in 1999. Following a brief stint at the independent production company Intermedia Films, he ventured into freelance work, starting as a Production Supervisor on a number of feature films. Since then, he has gone on to serve as a Co-Producer on many feature films, including TRON: Legacy and Walt Disney's live action remake of Beauty And The Beast and Christopher Robin. Since 2018, Steve has been working as a Producer in episodic television series The Witcher.

== Filmography ==
Year	Film/TV
2019-2022	The Witcher
2019	The Thing Before The Thing
2018	Christopher Robin
2017	Beauty and the Beast
2014	Unbroken
2013	Oblivion
2011	The Paul Reiser Show (TV)
2010	TRON: Legacy
2009	Terminator Salvation
2008	Traitor
2007	Atlanta (TV) Balls of Fury
2006	The Return
2005	When Do We Eat
2004	Mindhunters
2002	If Only
