= Nathaniel Curtis =

British actor

- Born: 29 December 1990 (age 35)
- Education: East 15 Acting School
- Occupation: Actor
- Years active: 2019–present

Nathaniel Curtis (born 29 December 1990) is a British actor. He is best known for his role as Ash Mukherjee in the Channel 4 drama It's a Sin (2021).

== Early life and education ==
Curtis grew up just outside Bournemouth to an English mother and an Indian father. He completed his acting degree at East 15 Acting School in Loughton, Essex in 2014.

== Career ==
After graduating, Curtis went five years without an acting job. One of his first acting roles was as Romeo in Romeo and Juliet for Fuller's Brewery's Shakespeare in the Garden theatre series, run by Open Bar Theatre in 2019 which was nominated for the 2019 Offie. He later played Ferdinand, Alonso, and Trinculo in the following year's production of The Tempest.

Curtis played Ash Mukherjee in It's a Sin, the British television series developed by Russell T Davies that premiered in early 2021 on Channel 4 in the UK and on HBO Max in the United States. Curtis was named the winner of the 2021 Great British Bake Off Christmas Special after competing in baking challenges with other members of the cast of It's a Sin.

In the summer of 2022, Curtis returned to the stage to play the title role in Britannicus at the Lyric Theatre, Hammersmith.

He played the role of Brian in The Witcher: Blood Origin, a Netflix miniseries that serves as a prequel to The Witcher and was released on 25 December 2022.

Following his performance in the world premiere of Andrew Stein's play, Disruption, at the Park Theatre in London in the summer of 2023, Curtisr joined the cast of 2:22 A Ghost Story.

In December 2023, he had a brief appearance as Sir Isaac Newton in the Doctor Who 60th anniversary special "Wild Blue Yonder".

In 2024, Curtis portrayed the character Zaid in The Real Ones at Bush Theatre in London.

== Personal life ==
Curtis identifies as queer and stands 6'5" tall. He has an older sister.

== Stage and screen credits ==
=== Television ===
Year	Title	Role	Network	Notes	Ref
2021	It's a Sin	Ash Mukherjee	Channel 4 (UK); HBO Max (US)	5 episodes	
2021	The Great Christmas Bake Off	Himself	Channel 4	2021 Winner	
2022	The Witcher: Blood Origin	Brian	Netflix		
2023	Captain Laserhawk: A Blood Dragon Remix	Dolph Laserhawk	Netflix	Lead voice role	
2023	Doctor Who	Isaac Newton	BBC One	Episode: "Wild Blue Yonder"	
2026	Lynley	Prof Hamish Milne	BBC One	Episode: "With No-One as a Witness"	

=== Theatre ===
Year	Title	Role	Notes	Ref
2013	Pride and Prejudice	Ensemble	Regent's Park Open Air Theatre, London	
2019	Romeo and Juliet	Romeo	Fuller's Shakespeare in the Garden	
2020	The Tempest	Ferdinand	Fuller's Shakespeare in the Garden	
2022	Britannicus	Britannicus	Lyric Hammersmith Theatre, London	
2023	Disruption	Ben	Park Theatre (London), London	
2023	2:22 A Ghost Story	Sam	UK Tour	
2024	The Real Ones by Waleed Akhtar	Zaid	Bush Theatre, London	

=== Audio ===
Year	Title	Role	Notes
2021	Torchwood	Lancelyn Green	Episode: "The Five People You Kill in Middlesbrough"

== Awards and nominations ==
Year	Award	Category	Work	Result	Ref
2022	BPG Awards	Breakthrough Award (Note: Shared.)	It's a Sin	Nominated	
