= The Witcher: Nightmare of the Wolf (soundtrack) =

The Witcher: Nightmare of the Wolf (Music from the Netflix Anime Film)

Soundtrack album by Brian D'Olivera
- Released: August 27, 2021
- Recorded: 2021
- Genre: Film score
- Length: 72:20
- Label: Milan
- Producer: Brian D'Olivera

The Witcher: Nightmare of the Wolf (Music from the Netflix Anime Film) is the soundtrack album to the 2021 film The Witcher: Nightmare of the Wolf. The film score is composed by Brian D'Olivera and released through Milan Records on August 27, 2021.

== Development ==
Brian D'Olivera composed the film score. D'Olivera spent six months with writer Beau DeMayo to ascertain the musical sound world and the character themes as a singular cohesive musical voice which felt familiar and uniquely distinctive. He decided to explore the darker and deeper side the continental sound in the most "unusual way", which led him to his extensive knowledge of medieval and baroque music which blended with other musical traditions all over the world. His learnings and experience with Indian classical music became the foundation for the musical aesthetics. With all of this work, D'Olivera was able to deliver rapidly during the production process by recording all of the scores one track at a time, emulating the performances so it gets a feeling of how classic anime scores were composed.

With his extensive research in the field, D'Olivera had custom-developed his own recording techniques and virtual musical instruments based on this technology. This gave him the ability to extremely pitch and manipulate recorded sounds while retaining the full spectral resolution allowing him to access sounds and textures that humans would never normally hear by conventional means. He considered it as an invaluable toolset to bring out the magical and otherworldly qualities of the universe and was able to achieve the sonic representations of the mutations and dark magic elements that penetrated the storyline.

Citing an example of a scene, where Vesemir discovered the lab that creating Chimeras, the main instrument was a medieval bowed viol pitched down several octaves and sounded like "an ancient dark, and almost voice-like instrument" which did not exist but perfectly fitted the mood and storytelling. Vesemir's "Trial Of The Grasses" served as one of the key moments where D'Olivera dwelled into the extremes of Vesemir's flamboyant personality juxtaposed with the violence and his pain. He considered it the first piece he composed that becoming the foundation of the rest of the score in terms of aesthetic and intensity through the music, melody and texture.

== Release ==
Milan Records released the score on August 27, 2021, four days after the film's release.

== Reception ==
Erik Kain of Forbes wrote "the music, composed by Brian D'Oliveira (whose past work is mostly in video games) is quite lovely as well". Caroline Cao of Den of Geek called the score "artistic". Divya Kala Bhavani of The Hindu wrote "The score from Brian D'Oliveira enhances the tones of the film, through string-heavy compositions. D'Oliveira, who also penned the music for the much-loved Resident Evil: Village video game, has certainly brought his musical chops here." Angie Han of The Hollywood Reporter called the score "fantastic". Samantha Nelson of IGN wrote "Brian D'Oliveira's music gives chills, especially during the climactic battle scene."

== Track listing ==
No.	Title	Artist(s)	Length
1.	"There'll Always Be Another Monster"	Brian D'Oliveira; Blánid	2:44
2.	"Tetra's Wrath"	Brian D'Oliveira; Blánid; Regina Reichherzer	3:06
3.	"Monstrum's Lullaby"	Brian D'Oliveira; Luke Youngblood	1:42
4.	"March of the Monsters"		1:33
5.	"The Red Swamp"		3:09
6.	"Goodbye Illyana"		3:24
7.	"Exorcism"		1:38
8.	"Vesemir's Trial"		2:26
9.	"A Witcher"		3:56
10.	"Ruins of a Past Age"		3:47
11.	"Battle for the Bridge"		2:41
12.	"Strength in Unity"		2:31
13.	"An Unraveling Lie"		1:02
14.	"Kitsu's Illusion"		3:44
15.	"A Life of Coin"		2:36
16.	"Jesting Around"		1:46
17.	"The Long Road Ahead"		2:10
18.	"Illyana's Theme"		3:14
19.	"Enter the Bestiary"		2:49
20.	"It's Just an Illusion"		3:27
21.	"Sugo's Lamentation"		1:00
22.	"Foul Sorcery"		1:22
23.	"Cautionary Tale"		1:17
24.	"A Stranger"		1:25
25.	"A Fate's Hesitation"		2:00
26.	"A Lucrative Business"		1:40
27.	"Deglan's Deception"		2:17
28.	"I Choose My Own Fate"		1:49
29.	"Last Stand"		2:14
30.	"End of an Age"	Brian D'Oliveira; Blánid	3:51
