= Lauren Schmidt Hissrich =

American television producer and screenwriter

Lauren Schmidt-Hissrich
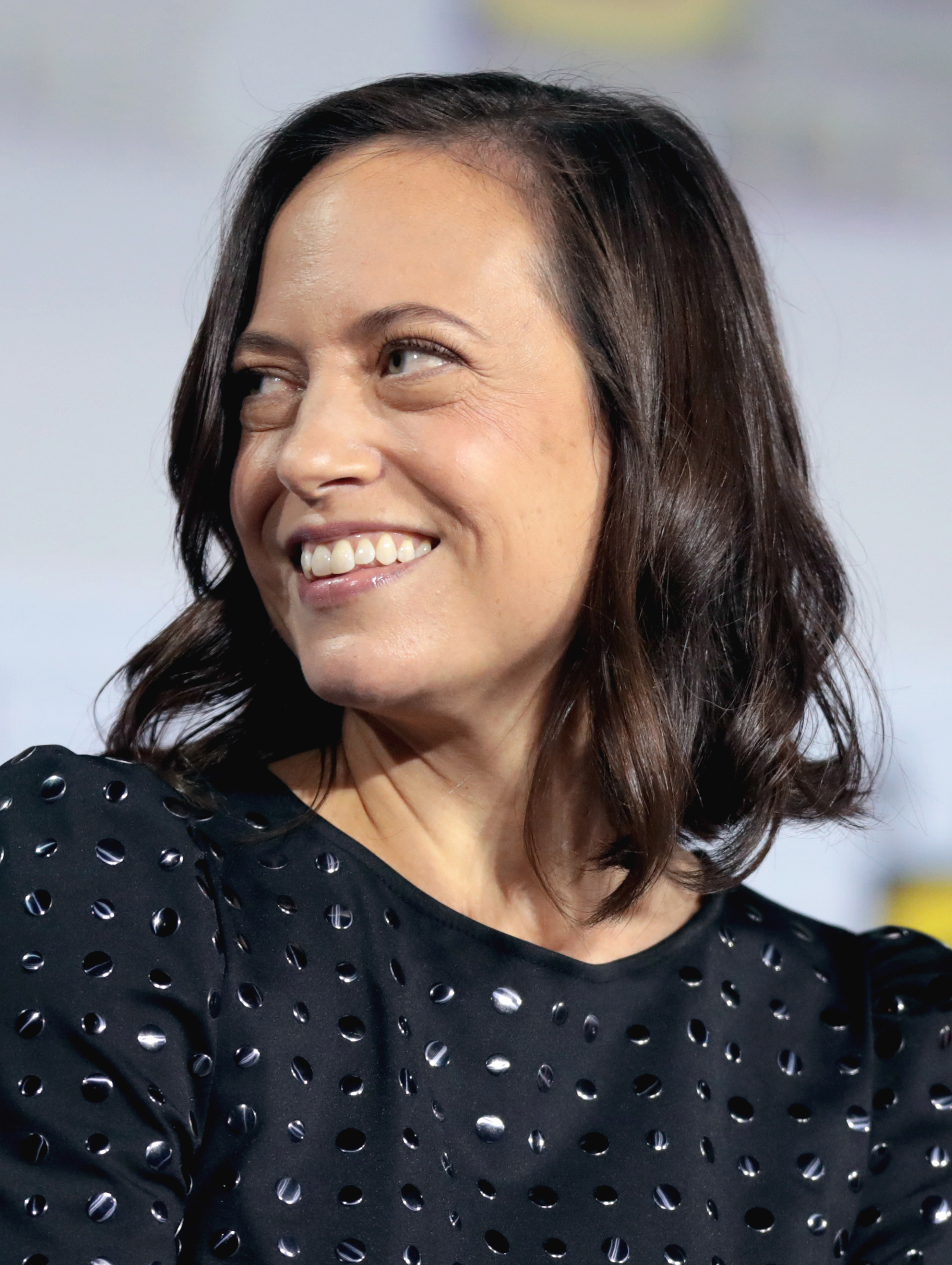
- Schmidt Hissrich at the 2019 San Diego Comic-Con
- Born: Lauren Schmidt; August 1, 1978 (age 48); Westerville, Ohio, United States
- Education: Wittenberg University (BA)
- Occupations: Television producer, screenwriter
- Years active: 2002–present
- Children: 2

Lauren Schmidt-Hissrich (/ˈhɪsrɪk/ HIS-rik) (born August 1, 1978) is an American television producer and screenwriter. She is the show runner for The Witcher.

== Early life ==
She was raised in Westerville, Ohio, and graduated from Wittenberg University in Springfield, Ohio, in 2000 with a BA in English literature and creative writing.

== Career ==
She has written scripts for television series The West Wing and Justice, as well as written and produced shows such as Parenthood, Do No Harm, Private Practice, Daredevil, The Defenders and The Umbrella Academy. She is the show runner and executive producer of The Witcher, a Netflix original series loosely based on the book series by Andrzej Sapkowski.

In 2021, it was reported that she had signed an overall deal with Netflix.

== Filmography ==
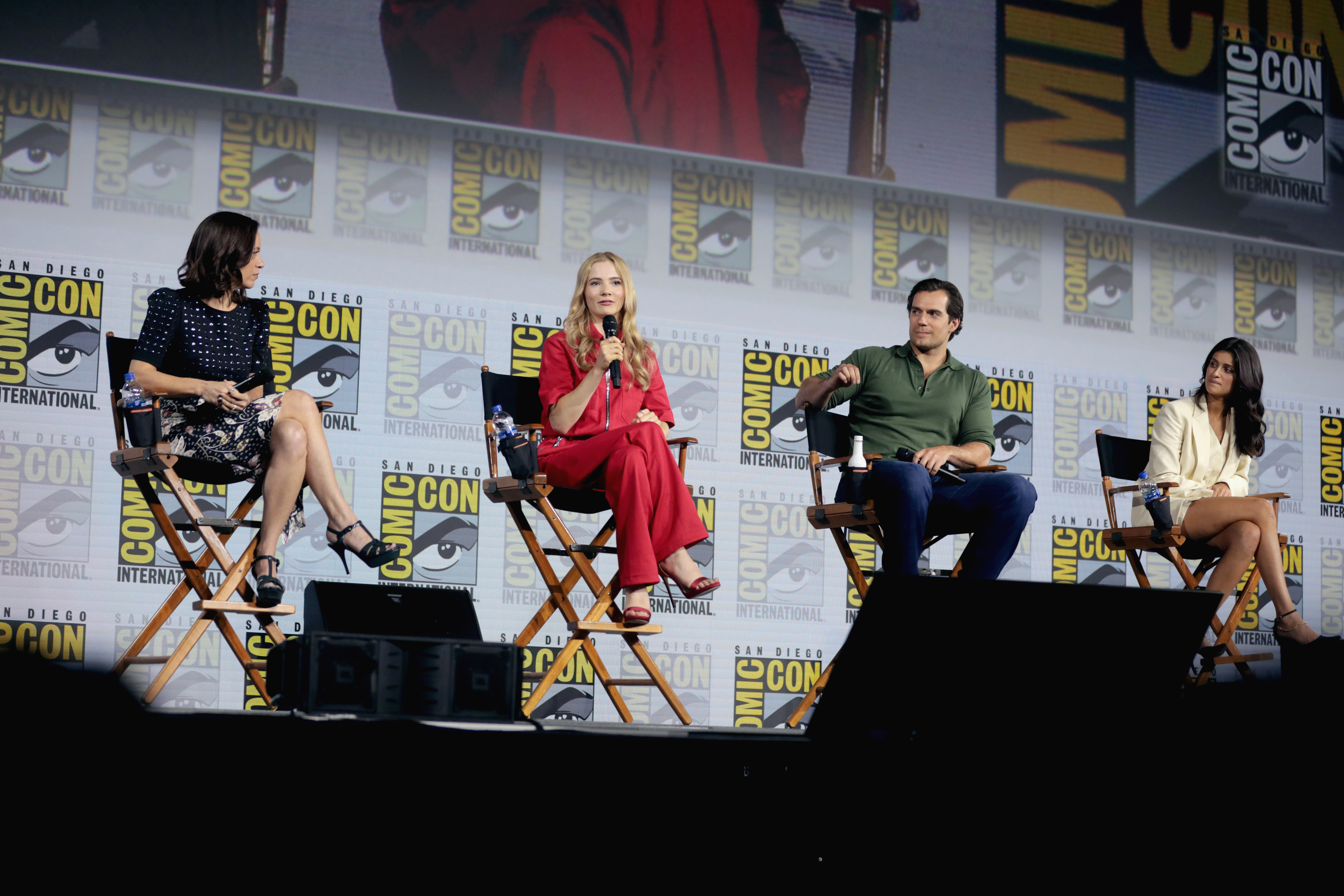
Lauren Schmidt Hissrich with The Witcher cast at the 2019 San Diego Comic-Con

=== Television ===
Year(s)	Title	Credited as			Notes
Year(s)	Title	Writer	Executive producer	Other	Notes
2002–2006	The West Wing	Yes	No	Yes	Story editor, researcher
2006–2007	Justice	Yes	No	Yes	Story editor
2007	Drive	Yes	No	Yes	Story editor
2007–2009	Private Practice	Yes	Yes	No	
2010	Parenthood	Yes	Yes	No	
2013	Do No Harm	Yes	Yes	No	
2014	Power	Yes	No	No	
2016	Daredevil	Yes	No	No	
2017	The Defenders	Yes	No	No	
2019	The Umbrella Academy	Yes	No	No	
2019–present	The Witcher	Yes	Yes	Yes	Showrunner
2021	The Witcher: Nightmare of the Wolf	No	No	Yes	Producer, Animated film
2022	The Witcher: Blood Origin	Yes	Yes	Yes	
2025	The Witcher: Sirens of the Deep	No	No	Yes	Producer, Animated film

== Personal life ==
She lives in Los Angeles with her husband—also a television producer—and two sons.
