= Mike Ostrowski =

American television producer and writer

Michael Ostrowski is an American television producer and screenwriter, best known for his work on serial drama Jericho and CSI spin-off CSI: Miami, both of which he has worked on as a producer and screenwriter. He has served as co-executive producer on NBC's The Blacklist and The Player, and on USA's Colony. He is currently a co-executive producer on Netflix's hit show The Witcher.

As a producer, he has worked on the series Jericho, E-Ring and CSI: Miami, serving as supervising producer, producer and co-producer respectively. His writing credits are again for CSI: Miami and Jericho, and also for Private Practice and The District.
