= Jacob Collins-Levy =

British-Australian actor (born 1992)

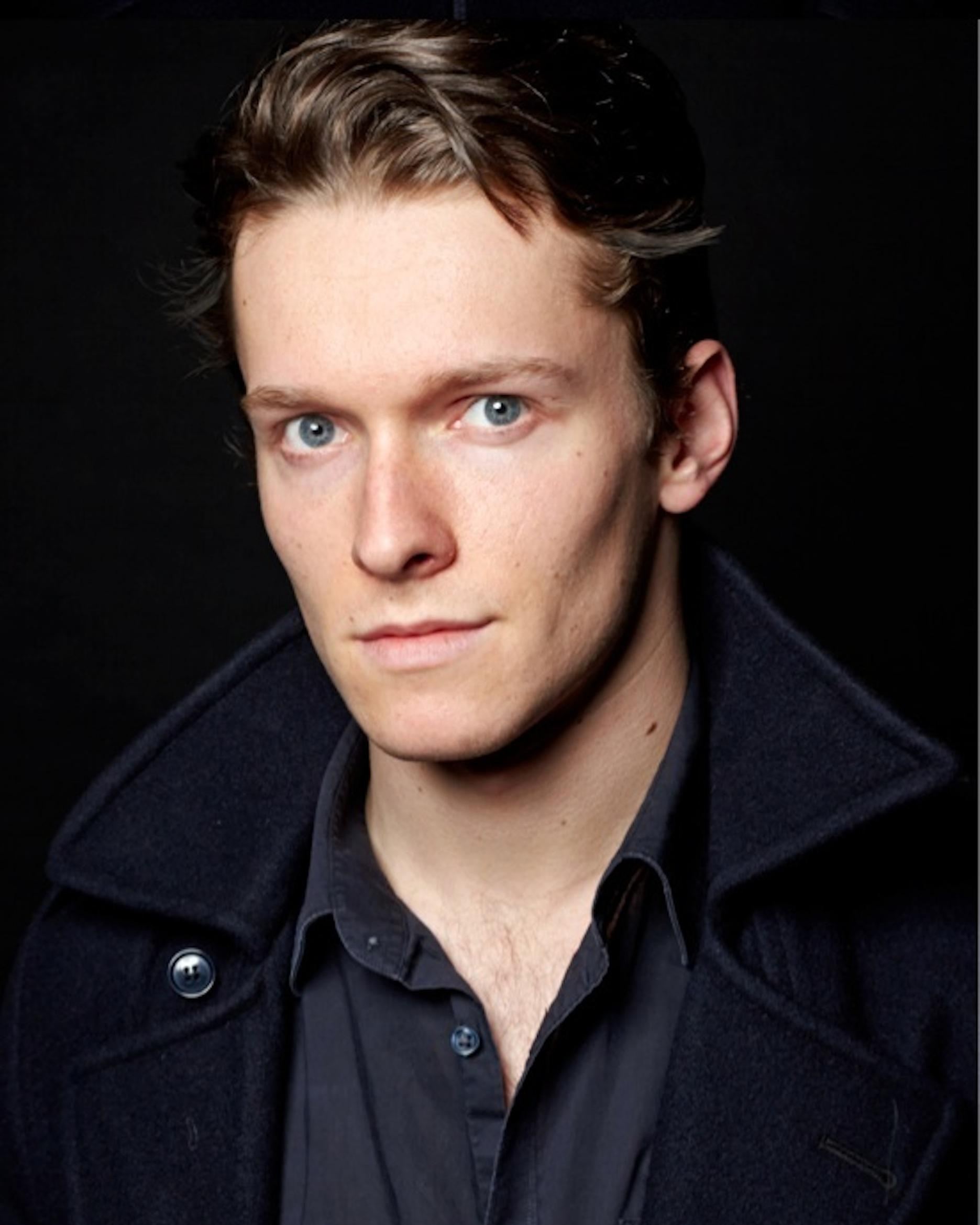
- Born: 18 March 1992 (age 34); Melbourne, Australia
- Occupation: Actor
- Years active: 2015–present

Jacob Collins-Levy (born 18 March 1992) is an Australian actor. On television, he is known for his role in the Starz series The White Princess (2017), and the Netflix series Young Wallander (2020) and The Witcher: Blood Origin (2022). His films include True History of the Kelly Gang (2019).

== Early life and education ==
Jacob Collins-Levy was born in Melbourne, to an Australian mother and an English father. He has one younger brother.

In 2012 and 2013, he took classes at the 16th Street Actors Studio in Melbourne.

== Career ==
After brief appearances in 2015, in Holding the Man and Glitch, Collins-Levy's first major appearance on the big screen came in 2016, as the heartless drug dealer 'Saul' in the film Joe Cinque's Consolation, which was selected for the 41st Toronto International Film Festival. Collins-Levy played Henry VII of England in the Starz television series The White Princess, set in the aftermath of the Wars of the Roses, with co-star Jodie Comer as his wife Elizabeth of York.

In 2019, Collins-Levy appeared in Justin Kurzel's film True History of the Kelly Gang. He played Karl-Axel Munck in the first season of the 2020 Netflix crime drama Young Wallander, and guest starred as Lord Byron in the Doctor Who series 12 episode "The Haunting of Villa Diodati".

In 2022, he appeared in the Netflix series The Witcher: Blood Origin where he played the villain, Eredin, in a cast which included Mirren Mack, Lenny Henry, and Michelle Yeoh. The same year, he was cast in the Disney+ series Nautilus as Captain Youngblood.

Collins-Levy performs on stage in his hometown of Melbourne. In 2021, he appeared in a performance of Lanford Wilson's Burn This at fortyfivedownstairs, and in 2023 he portrayed Count Orlok in the Malthouse Theatre stage adaptation of Nosferatu. In 2024, he played the title role in Hamlet. A portrait of him in the role was a finalist for the 2026 Archibald Prize, winning the Packing Room Prize.

== Filmography ==
=== Film ===
Year	Title	Role	Notes
2015	Holding the Man	Andrew	
2016	Joe Cinque's Consolation	Saul	
2019	True History of the Kelly Gang	Thomas Curnow	
2025	Leviathan	Chris	Post-Production

=== Television ===
Year	Title	Role	Notes
2015	Gallipoli	Young ANZAC	Episode: "The Breakout"
2015	Glitch	Rory Fitzgerald	3 episodes
2017	Barracuda	Clyde	Episode: "2000"
2017	The White Princess	Henry VII of England	Main role
2019	Bloom	Young Herb	Episodes: "The Kick Inside" and "Little Miracle"
2019	Pure	Benji	1 episode
2020	Doctor Who	Lord Byron	Episode: "The Haunting of Villa Diodati"
2020	Young Wallander	Karl-Axel Munck	5 episodes
2020	The Liberator	Corporal Tucker	Episodes: "The Enemy" and "Home"
2021	Ms Fisher's Modern Murder Mysteries	Laurence Osborn	Episode: "Blood Wedding"
2022	The Witcher: Blood Origin	Eredin	Main role
2024	Prosper	Jed Quinn	8 episodes
2024	Nautilus	Captain Youngblood	10 episodes

=== Theatre ===
Year	Title	Role	Venue
2021	Burn This	Burton	fortyfivedownstairs, Melbourne
2023	Nosferatu	Count Orlok	Malthouse Theatre, Melbourne
2024	Hamlet	Hamlet	fortyfivedownstairs with Melbourne Shakespeare Company

=== Video games ===
Year	Title	Role	Notes
2022	The Diofield Chronicle	Isarion Colchester	English version, voice
