= Michael C. Ostrowski =

American cancer biologist and geneticist

Michael C. Ostrowski is an American cancer biologist and geneticist currently is the WH Folk Endowed Professor at Hollings Cancer Center, Medical University of South Carolina and an Elected Fellow at the American Association for the Advancement of Science. His interests are cancer cells and genes.

== Education ==
He earned his B.S. at Illinois Benedictine College in 1975 and Ph.D at University of South Carolina.

== Academic Positions ==
2017–Present WH Folk Endowed Professor of Experimental Oncology https://medicine.musc.edu/departments/biochemistry Department of Biochemistry and Molecular Biology, Medical University of South Carolina, Charleston SC

2017–Present Senior Advisor to the Director, Hollings Cancer Center, Medical University of South Carolina, Charleston SC

2014-2017 Professor and Vice-Chair, Cancer Biology & Genetics Department, Ohio State University Medical Center, Columbus, OH

2010-2016 Co-Director, Solid Tumor Biology Program, Ohio State University Comprehensive Cancer Center

2006-2014 Professor & Chair, Molecular & Cellular Biochemistry Department, Ohio State University Medical Center, Columbus, OH

1999-2017 Co-Director, Molecular Biology & Cancer Genetics Program, Ohio State University Comprehensive Cancer Center

1999-2006 Professor, Molecular Genetics Department, Ohio State University, Columbus, OH

1995-1999 Associate Professor, Molecular Genetics Department, Ohio State University, Columbus, OH

1985-1995 Assistant Professor, Department of Microbiology & Immunology, Duke University Medical Center, Durham, NC

1983-1985 Senior Staff Fellow, Lab of Tumor Virus Genetics, National Cancer Institute, Bethesda, MD

== Publications ==
https://www.ncbi.nlm.nih.gov/myncbi/michael.ostrowski.2/bibliography/public/

https://scholar.google.com/citations?user=xdIRtREAAAAJ&hl=en

https://orcid.org/0000-0003-2948-6297
