= The Witcher: Blood Origin =

American drama miniseries

- Genre: Action; Adventure; Drama; Fantasy
- Created by: Declan de Barra; Lauren Schmidt Hissrich
- Based on: The Witcher by Andrzej Sapkowski
- Showrunner: Declan de Barra
- Starring: Sophia Brown; Laurence O'Fuarain; Mirren Mack; Lenny Henry; Jacob Collins Levy; Joey Batey; Zach Wyatt; Lizzie Annis; Huw Novelli; Francesca Mills; Amy Murray; Minnie Driver; Michelle Yeoh; Dylan Moran
- Narrated by: Minnie Driver
- Composer: Bear McCreary
- Countries of origin: United States; Poland
- Original language: English
- No. of episodes: 4

Production
- Executive producers: Declan de Barra; Sean Daniel; Jason Brown; Tomasz Bagiński; Jarosław Sawko; Lauren Schmidt Hissrich; Matt O'Toole
- Running time: 43–64 minutes
- Production companies: Hivemind; Platige Image

Original release
- Network: Netflix
- Release: December 25, 2022

Related
- The Witcher

The Witcher: Blood Origin is a fantasy television miniseries created by Declan de Barra and Lauren Schmidt Hissrich and loosely adapted from the Witcher book series by Andrzej Sapkowski. It serves as a prequel to The Witcher. The series premiered on Netflix on December 25, 2022, and consists of four episodes. It received largely negative reviews from critics, although the action sequences did receive some praise.

== Premise ==
Set 1,200 years before the events of The Witcher television series, Blood Origin depicts the creation of the first Witcher, as well as the events leading to the "Conjunction of the Spheres". It also explores the ancient Elven civilization Xin'trea before its demise. Geralt of Rivia's bard ally Jaskier is saved from a war by the mysterious elf Seanchai where she has him write down the untold legend of seven warriors who went up against the forces of Xin'trea following its coup d'état.

== Cast and characters ==
=== Main ===
- Sophia Brown as Éile, a warrior of the Queen's guard and member of the Raven Clan who leaves to become a traveling musician
  - Minee Mais as young Éile
- Laurence O'Fuarain as Fjall, an elf born into a clan of warriors called the Dog Clan sworn to protect a king, but instead sets out in need of vengeance after the Empress betrays his clan.
- Mirren Mack as Merwyn, the history-obsessed Princess of Xin'trea whose life is controlled by her brother King Alvatir, but who seeks to forge her own path
- Lenny Henry as Chief Druid Balor, a mage who has learned how to open gates to other worlds and has a plan of his own
- Jacob Collins-Levy as Eredin, the commander of the Xin'trean army, but with several secrets
- Joey Batey as Jaskier, a bard who once traveled with Geralt of Rivia and who is saved from likely death by the mysterious Seanchai
- Zach Wyatt as Syndril, the elfin mage who has discovered how to open gates between worlds
- Lizzie Annis as Zacaré, an elfin mage who is Syndril's celestial twin
- Huw Novelli as Callan "Brother Death", a retired sellsword who tracks down Éile, Fjall and Scían
- Francesca Mills as Meldof, a dwarf on a quest of revenge who wields a war hammer named after her late wife Gwen who was raped and killed by Xin'trean soldiers
- Amy Murray as Fenrik, Balor's druid apprentice who is deaf
- Minnie Driver as Seanchai, a mysterious figure who rescues Jaskier because she wants him to tell a tale about the "Conjunction of the Spheres"
- Michelle Yeoh as Scían, the last member of a nomadic tribe of sword-elves called the Ghost Clan who is on a mission to retrieve a blade stolen from her people
- Dylan Moran as Uthrok One-Nut, a sellsword colleague of Scían's

=== Supporting ===
- Mark Rowley as Alvatir, the King of Xin'trea and brother of Merwynn who tried to unify the clans
- Hiftu Quasem as Voice of Light, an unknown being who Balor interacts with in another world.
- Ella Schrey-Yeats as Ithlinne, a young girl with powers of vision with whom Eile becomes friends
- Ozioma Whenu as Níamh, the sister of Eile
- Kim Adis as Ket, the servant of Merwynn
- Kerri Quinn as Aevenien, the mother of Ithlinne
- Karlina Grace-Paseda as Cethlenn, the chief of Raven Clan and the mother of Eile and Níamh
  - Shanika Ocean as young Cethlenn
- Tomisin Ajani as Captain Olyf
- Samuel Blenkin as Avallac'h, a young mage who rescues Merwynn and becomes her protector
- Nathaniel Curtis as Brían, an elf marchand and Eredin's lover, the commander-in-chief of the Golden Empire army, since relationships between lower classes were prohibited.
- Aidan O'Callaghan as Kareg, the deceased brother of Fjall. Being the eldest son of the clan's leader, Osfar Stoneheart, it was expected that Kareg would inherit his father's position. For his part, Kareg lived up to this expectation, fiercely fighting in numerous battles in his kingdom's name. However, this all came to an abrupt end during the Battle of Brokilon, where he was killed by a member of the Raven Clan.
- Zachary Hart as Leifur
- Hebe Beardsall as Catrin, a villager who leads the revolt

== Episodes ==
No.	Title	Directed by	Written by	Original release date
1	"Of Ballads, Brawlers, and Bloodied Blades"	Sarah O'Gorman; Vicky Jewson	Declan de Barra	December 25, 2022
Jaskier is about to be killed in battle when time freezes around him and Seanchai appears to tell him the story of seven heroes against an empire, during which humans and monsters came into the world and the first witcher was created. First to be introduced is Eile, a bard who sings of the lowborn elves rebelling against their masters. Second is Fjall, a royal guard who is exiled for having sex with Princess Merwyn of Xin'trea (later Cintra). Merwyn's brother King Alvidir hopes to marry her off to the ruler of a rival kingdom to forestall war, but his advisor Balor summons a monster to the peace meeting to kill both leaders. Balor had hoped to treat Merwyn as a puppet empress of the newly combined kingdoms, but she's resistant to his direction. Eile and Fjall's rival clans are no more, and they come together to avenge the old order. Third of the seven to be introduced is Scian, who speaks of a poisoned king and a sacred sword.
2	"Of Dreams, Defiance, and Desperate Deeds"	Vicky Jewson	Alex Meenehan and Aaron Stewart-Ahn	December 25, 2022
Eile, Fjall, and Scian attempt to rob a bank, but it's an ambush and Scian's wounded by a poisoned blade. The three flee to the woods where they meet Callan, or Brother Death, a reformed killer who joins them and leads them to the healer Zacare and mystic Syndril, who worked with Balor to raise the monoliths that permit monsters to enter the world but who escaped and now explains that they must destroy the master monolith in Xin’trea to save the world. The six try to use a monolith to reach Xin'trea but end up on another world fighting a gigantic centipede-like monster. Meanwhile, Merwyn's saved by the scholar Avallac'h from an assassination attempt and holds on to him as an ally not beholden to Balor. She then leaves the castle in disguise to learn that the people are starving and Balor’s co-conspirator Eredin has a secret lower-class lover, which Balor would not allow, permitting Merwyn to bring Eredin to her side to steal Balor’s book to operate the monolith. Separately, dwarf Meldof kills an elf for raping and murdering her lover Gwen, and names her hammer Gwen.
3	"Of Warriors, Wakes, and Wondrous Worlds"	Vicky Jewson; Sarah O'Gorman	Tania Lotia and Kiersten Van Horne	December 25, 2022
The six caught on the other world escape through the portal and close it to cut the creature in half, after which Meldof makes six into seven. The seven decide to use elixirs, magic, and herbs with the corpse of the centipede creature to empower one of them to fight Balor’s creature. Eile insists it should be her, and asks for a wake in advance. Eile and Fjall make love afterward. Eile awakens to find that Fjall has already taken the concoction that has made him the first witcher. Meanwhile, Avallac’h fails to draw upon the power of the monolith, so Merwyn frees Balor on condition he help her. Scian offers to betray Eile and Fjall to Merwyn, who gives her troops to bring them in but whom Scian leads into the seven’s ambush so that they will have Xin’trean armor to get past the gates, after which they plan to incite a grain riot to produce enough chaos for them to destroy the monolith and stop Merwyn.
4	"Of Mages, Malice, and Monstrous Mayhem"	Sarah O'Gorman	Declan de Barra & Tasha Huo	December 25, 2022
Merwyn is now using the monoliths to invade other worlds to find food for her empire, but Balor soon unsurprisingly betrays her to absorb chaos magic to empower himself. Eile raises the commoners with song. Fjall fights Balor’s monster using his witcher abilities. Eile confronts Merwyn, who may have wanted to wipe out the kingdoms and clans but who is now, per Eile, “just another boot looking for more necks,” and kills her. Fjall defeats the monster but can’t restrain himself from attacking Brother Death, and Eile’s forced to kill him. Syndril stops Balor by magical means, destroying the monolith and unleashing the Conjunction of the Spheres. Eile is pregnant with Fjall’s baby, whom the prophet Ithlinne says will have a descendent who will “sing the last”.

== Production ==
It was announced in July 2020 that Netflix had green-lit a six-part miniseries prequel to its television series adaptation of the Andrzej Sapkowski novels. Declan de Barra was hired to serve as showrunner. In January 2021, Jodie Turner-Smith was cast to star in the series. Laurence O’Fuarain would join the cast in March, but by April, Turner-Smith had to exit due to scheduling conflicts. In July, Michelle Yeoh was added, with Sophia Brown taking over the role vacated by Turner-Smith.

Filming on the series began in August 2021 in the United Kingdom, with additional castings including Lenny Henry, Mirren Mack, Nathaniel Curtis and Dylan Moran announced. De Bara announced it had finished filming and went into post-production in November 2021.

== Reception ==
On the review aggregator website Rotten Tomatoes, 28% of 39 critics' reviews are positive, with an average rating of 5.2/10. The website's consensus reads: "A shallow excavation of ancient lore from Andrzej Sapkowski's fantasy series, Blood Origin shares ancestral DNA with The Witcher but little of what makes the mothership series memorable." On Metacritic, which uses a weighted average, the series has received a score of 45 out of 100 based on 15 critic reviews, indicating "mixed or average reviews".

David Griffin reviewing it for IGN praised it for special effects, action scenes, and the "engaging band of misfits" as protagonists, but noted that the story villains were not very interesting. Zosha Millman reviewing the series for Polygon criticized it for being mundane, writing that the show "has no time for consideration of what makes the Witcher universe unique or meaningful at all, leaving it as just a muddled, reckless attempt to get more Witcher stuff out the door". Andrew Webster writing for The Verge likewise argued that without the titular Witcher (Geralt of Rivia) or another memorable lead, the series lacks something special to make it stand on its own. Therese Lacson writing for the Collider criticized the series for its "slapdash storylines" and "half-baked" villains, and noted that too often the show "slips into either complete camp, cringe, or melodrama". Darren Mooney reviewing the show for The Escapist called it a "bloody mess" and a "spectacular misfire", criticizing its characters as uninteresting, and "editorial tinkering" as clumsy and ineffective. In Slant Magazine, Niv M. Sultan wrote that "the series proves too hurried and scattered to penetrate much beyond the surface of its universe and characters." Vicky Jessop in the London Evening Standard said that "it's hard to feel invested in the fate of the characters". David Opie writing for Digital Spy likewise criticized the cast, noting that "Most of these characters, and therefore Blood Origin itself, remain frustratingly limited".
