= Ben Radcliffe (actor) =

English actor

- Radcliffe at the 2026 BFI London Film Festival
- Born: 25 April 1998 (age 28); Leeds, England
- Occupation: Actor
- Years active: 2005–present

Ben Radcliffe (born 25 April 1998) is an English actor. He began his career on stage and in the film Cuban Fury (2014). His films since include Fackham Hall (2025). On television, he is known for his roles in the Disney Channel series The Evermoor Chronicles (2017), the CW series Pandora (2019–2020) and the Netflix series The Witcher (2023).

== Early life ==
Radcliffe was born in Leeds and grew up in the Little Preston suburb. His father John sold fruit machines, while his mother Vicky was a dancer. He and his older sister Charlotte took classes at Armley Dance Studios. Radcliffe earned scholarships to attend Sylvia Young Theatre School as a boarding student and then Hurtwood House.

== Career ==
Circa 2005, Radcliffe had his first professional role at age 7 on the UK tour of the musical Chitty Chitty Bang Bang. This was followed by the Oliver tour in 2009. He made his West End debut in the 2012 Children of Eden concert at the Prince of Wales Theatre.

In 2014, Radcliffe made his feature film debut in Cuban Fury, portraying the young version of the lead character Bruce Garrett. In 2017, he made his television debut when he joined the main cast of the Disney Channel series The Evermoor Chronicles for its second series as Iggi. From 2019 to 2020, he had a main role as Ralen in the CW science fiction series Pandora.

Radcliffe portrayed a young version of Rupert Friend's character in the 2022 Netflix miniseries Anatomy of a Scandal. In 2023, he featured in the third season of The Witcher as Giselher, a member of The Rats. He appeared in the 2024 Apple TV+ miniseries Masters of the Air as Capt. John D. Brady. Radcliffe starred in the 2025 period comedy film Fackham Hall.

== Personal life ==
As of 2022, Radcliffe was based in Earls Court.

== Filmography ==
=== Film ===
Year	Title	Role	Notes	Ref.
2014	Cuban Fury	Young Bruce		
2023	The Shepherd	Freddie Hooke	Short film	
2025	Red Sonja	Daix		
2025	Fackham Hall	Eric Noone/Nathaniel Davenport		
2026	The Face of Horror	Roger		

=== Television ===
Year	Title	Role	Notes	Ref.
2017	The Evermoor Chronicles	Iggi	Main role, 11 episodes	
2017	The Lodge	Max	1 episode	
2018	Ransom	Henry Cummings	1 episode	
2018	Hetty Feather	Robert Grenford	4 episodes	
2019–2020	Pandora	Ralen	Main role, 23 episodes	
2022	Anatomy of a Scandal	Young James Whitehouse	Miniseries, 6 episodes	
2023–present	The Witcher	Giselher	Main role, 8 episodes	
2024	Masters of the Air	Capt. John D. Brady	Miniseries, 6 episodes	
2025	The Rats: A Witcher Tale	Giselher	Netflix Television special	
2027	The Age of Innocence †	Newland Archer	Upcoming miniseries	
