= Brodsky =

Brodsky or Brodskyy (feminine: Brodskaya or Brodska; Ukrainian: Бродський, Russian: Бродский) is a toponymic surname derived from Brody, a town in Ukraine. The name is common among Ashkenazi Jews. It is also an Anglicized and Germanized form of the Czech surname Brodský. Notable people with the surname include:

- Adam Brodsky, American singer
- Adolph Brodsky (1851–1929), Russian violinist and music teacher
- Alexander Brodsky (born 1955), Russian architect and sculptor
- Chuck Brodsky (born 1960), American musician
- G. W. Stephen Brodsky (born 1933), Canadian literary research scholar and author
- Gail Brodsky (born 1991), American tennis player
- Hyman Brodsky (1852–1937), Russian-American rabbi
- Isaac Brodsky (1884–1939), Soviet painter
- Jascha Brodsky (1907–1997), Ukrainian-American violinist
- Joel Brodsky (1939–2007), photographer
- Joseph Brodsky (1940–1996), Russian poet and Nobel Prize winner
- Joseph R. Brodsky, American lawyer
- Julian A. Brodsky (born 1933), American businessman
- Lazar Brodsky (1848–1904), Ukrainian businessman and philanthropist
- Louis Daniel Brodsky (1941–2014), American poet
- Mel Brodsky, American basketball player and coach
- Michael Brodsky (born 1948), American novelist and playwright
- Mykhaylo Brodskyy (born 1959), Ukrainian politician and businessman
- Nina Brodskaya (born 1947/1949), Soviet singer
- Richard Brodsky (1946–2020), American politician and lawyer
- Sol Brodsky (1923–1984), American comic book artist
- Stanley Brodsky (born 1940), American physicist
- Stephen Brodsky (born 1979), American rock musician
- Vadim Brodsky (born 1950), Ukrainian-Polish violinist
- Yulia Brodskaya (born 1983), Russian artist and illustrator

== See also ==
- Brodsky Quartet
- Brodzki
