= Brodzki =

Brodzic coat of arms used by some of Brodzki family

Brodzki (feminine: Brodzka, plural: Brodzcy) is a Polish surname. Some of them use Brodzic, Łodzia or Nałęcz coat of arms. Notable people with the surname include:

- Constantin Brodzki (1924–2021), Polish-Italian Belgian architect
- Ewa Brodzka (born 1959), Polish film-maker
- Marek Brodzki (born 1960), Polish film director and television director

== See also ==
- Horace Brodzky (1885–1969), Australian-born artist of Polish Jewish descent
- Nicholas Brodszky (1905–1958) Ukraininan-American composer and songwriter
- Bródzki
- Brodsky
- Brodský
- Brodzik
