= Wiedźmin (disambiguation) =

The Witcher (Polish: Wiedźmin) is a fantasy series of novels by Andrzej Sapkowski, and the first story in the series (1990).

Wiedźmin may also refer to:

== Media ==
- The original title for The Witcher (video game), 2007
- The original title for The Hexer, a 2002 TV series based on the novels
  - The original title for The Hexer, the shorter 2001 film version
  - Wiedźmin (album), a 2001 music album with the music from The Hexer

== Biology ==
- Wiedźmin (tree), one of the largest elms in Europe, located in Poland
