= Lew Rywin =

Polish film producer

- Born: 10 November 1945 (age 79); Nizhnyeye Alkeyevo, Tatar ASSR, USSR
- Occupation: film producer

Lew Rywin (born 10 November 1945 in a Nizhnyeye Alkeyevo, USSR) is a Polish film producer associated with Heritage Films (est. 1991). He has also been a member of the State Council of Radio and Television and worked in an agency, Poltel, and producing for Polish state-run TV.

He participated in producing films such as Steven Spielberg's Schindler's List, Roman Polański's The Pianist, Jan Jakub Kolski's Pornografia and Marek Brodzki's The Hexer, based on The Witcher books by Andrzej Sapkowski. His last film was never produced. It was about the life of Holocaust survivor Herman Rosenblat (with producers Harris Salomon and Abi Sirokh). The film was titled Love is a Survivor and was later changed to The Flower of the Fence. Altogether, he has served in a producer role in the making of 27 movies.

In 2002, he was a key figure in the Rywin affair, a major corruption scandal in Poland.

== Filmography ==
- 1990: Europa Europa
- 1993: Schindler's List
- 1993: Uprowadzenie Agaty
- 1995: Tato (film)
- 1995: Holy Week (film)
- 1996: Matka swojej matki
- 1996: Wirus (film)
- 1997: An Air So Pure (Executive Producer)
- 1997: Sara
- 1997: Bastard
- 1997–2000: 13 posterunek
- 1998: Złoto dezerterów
- 1999: Prawo ojca
- 1999: Aimée & Jaguar
- 1999: Voyages
- 1999: Jakob the Liar
- 1999: Sir Thaddeus
- 2000: Proof of Life
- 2001: The Hexer
- 2001: Pamiętam
- 2002: The Pianist
- 2003: Pornografia

Source.

== See also ==
- Rywin affair
