= Wiedźmin (album) =

2001 album by Grzegorz Ciechowski

Wiedźmin is a 2001 album with music of Grzegorz Ciechowski for the film The Hexer, directed by Marek Brodzki, which was an adaptation of the collection of short stories by Andrzej Sapkowski of the same title. The album contains 22 compositions. In 2002, Ciechowski received (posthumously) the Polish Film Awards for the album in the "Best Score" category.

The album has been certified "gold" by the Polish Society of the Phonographic Industry.

== Artists involved ==
- Grzegorz Ciechowski
- Zbigniew Krzywański
- Alicja Węgorzewska-Whiskerd
- Michael Jones
- Zbigniew Zamachowski
- Robert Gawliński
- Sławomir Ciesielski
- Choir Kairos

== Song list ==
1. Wiedźmin
2. Pocałunek Yennefer
3. Zew wilka
4. Pierwsza rada Jaskra
5. Oniria
6. Lawina
7. Sen Yen
8. Druga rada Jaskra
9. Odnajdę cię, Ciri
10. Uciekajcie!
11. Trzecia rada Jaskra
12. Koniec z bandą Renfri
13. Jak gwiazdy nad traktem
14. Śmierć Renfri
15. Bajka dla małej driady
16. Leczenie ran
17. Karczma w Blaviken
18. Zapachniało jesienią
19. Ballada dla Yen
20. Czwarta rada Jaskra
21. Ratuj, Wiedźminie
22. Nie Pokonasz Miłości
