= Kasia Kowalska =

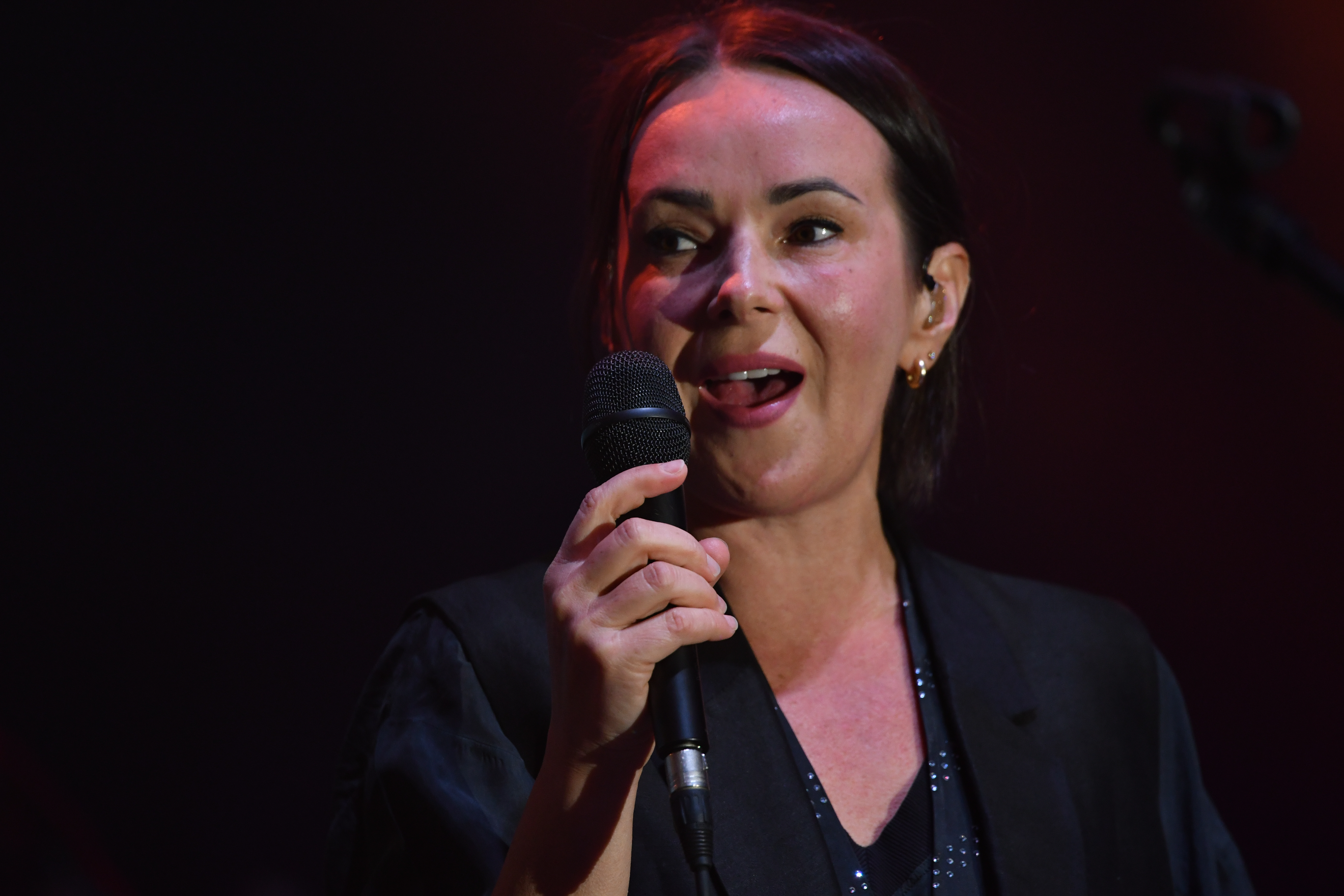
- Kasia Kowalska in Wrocław, 2023
- Born: Katarzyna Kowalska; 13 June 1973 (age 53); Sulejówek, Poland
- Occupations: Singer, actress
- Musical career
- Instruments: pop rock, pop
- Years active: 1992–present
- Labels: PolyGram Poland, Universal Music Poland
- Website: www.kasiakowalska.pl

Katarzyna "Kasia" Kowalska (Polish pronunciation: [ˈkaɕa kɔˈvalska]; born 13 June 1973) is a Polish singer, songwriter, producer, and actress.

She belongs to the top rung of most frequently broadcast Polish rock artists. Kowalska is one of the best-known Polish vocalists. The estimated sale of all her albums is over one million copies, which puts her among the Polish artists with the largest number of music publishers sold in Poland.

== Biography ==
Her musical experience began in the 1980s when she sang as a female vocalist for numerous Polish bands, including Human, Fatum and Talking Pictures. She began her musical career with the release of her debut album, titled Gemini, back in 1994. The LP has turned Triple Platinum (around half million copies sold). The album is said to represent her complex personality with the name following her zodiac sign. It is one of the most outstanding albums of Polish rock. In the same year she performed as a support act for Bob Dylan during his two concerts in Poland.

A year later, Kasia went on a tour called "Koncert Inaczej" which consisted of live performances of songs from the "Gemini" album in slightly different versions and jazz recitals during which she performed her favorite jazz standards of Billy Joel, Barbra Streisand etc. The concerts were recorded and realised on an album which had the same title as the tour – Koncert Inaczej (which means a concert differently). In the same year, she took part in the Sopot Festival, where she won Grand Prix. One of the judges was Malcolm McLaren.

In 1996, she represented Poland in the Eurovision Song Contest 1996 with a song called "Chcę znać swój grzech..." and finished 15th out of 23 and received 31 points (including 7 from three countries (Turkey, Greece, and Bosnia and Herzegovina but very few from the other ones). Afterwards, she starred in a movie called Nocne Graffiti and recorded a song for soundtrack of the movie. She also recorded a song to the soundtrack of a Disney movie, The Hunchback of Notre Dame – the prayer of Esmeralda.

Soon after that, she started working on some songs for a third album (second studio album). With the many changes in her life, a touch of optimism appeared in the new material. The first song which promoted Czekajac na… (Waiting for..) was called "Cos optymistycznego" (Something optimistic) and it showed a side of Kasia that nobody ever knew existed. The song was very much on the pop-funk side although the album itself was a combination of rock, funk and jazz and a touch of pop only in a few songs. This new style and an image that came with it made Kasia the most popular female polish singer in that year. The large tour for Czekajac na… gathered fans from around the country. It was so big, that some people compared it to the Beatles concerts because fans often fainted from excitement. By the end of the tour Kasia announced that she is pregnant (the father is a composer of a lot of songs on Czekajac na... and a known musician- Kostek Yoriadis).

In 1997 premiere has movie Nocne graffiti (Night graffiti). Kasia played an 18-year-old drug addict.

On 2 May 1997 she gave birth to her daughter Aleksandra Julia Kowalska.

Summer of 1998 was a time for Kasia's big comeback. She was ready to come back on stage again with the new material. The album Pelna obaw (Full of doubts) was a great surprise for Kasia's fans. After some experimenting with funk and jazz, she came back to her rock roots. The lyrics are rather personal. The themes : violence in the world and anger towards man. Kasia often said that Jagged Little Pill of Alanis Morissette really inspired her to record an album filled with feminist views. Kasia also produced this album by herself.

The next year and a half was spent on touring and coming up with material for a new album. In 2000 the album 5 came out. On 5 the sound is still based on rock music, except that it's enriched with loops and other electronic sounds.

In 2001, she won the MTV Europe Music Award for "Best Polish Artist" and she was invited to sing on a Tribute album to a racing car driver – Ayrton Senna who died tragically in 1994. She wrote the song "Bezpowrotnie" (Irrevocably).

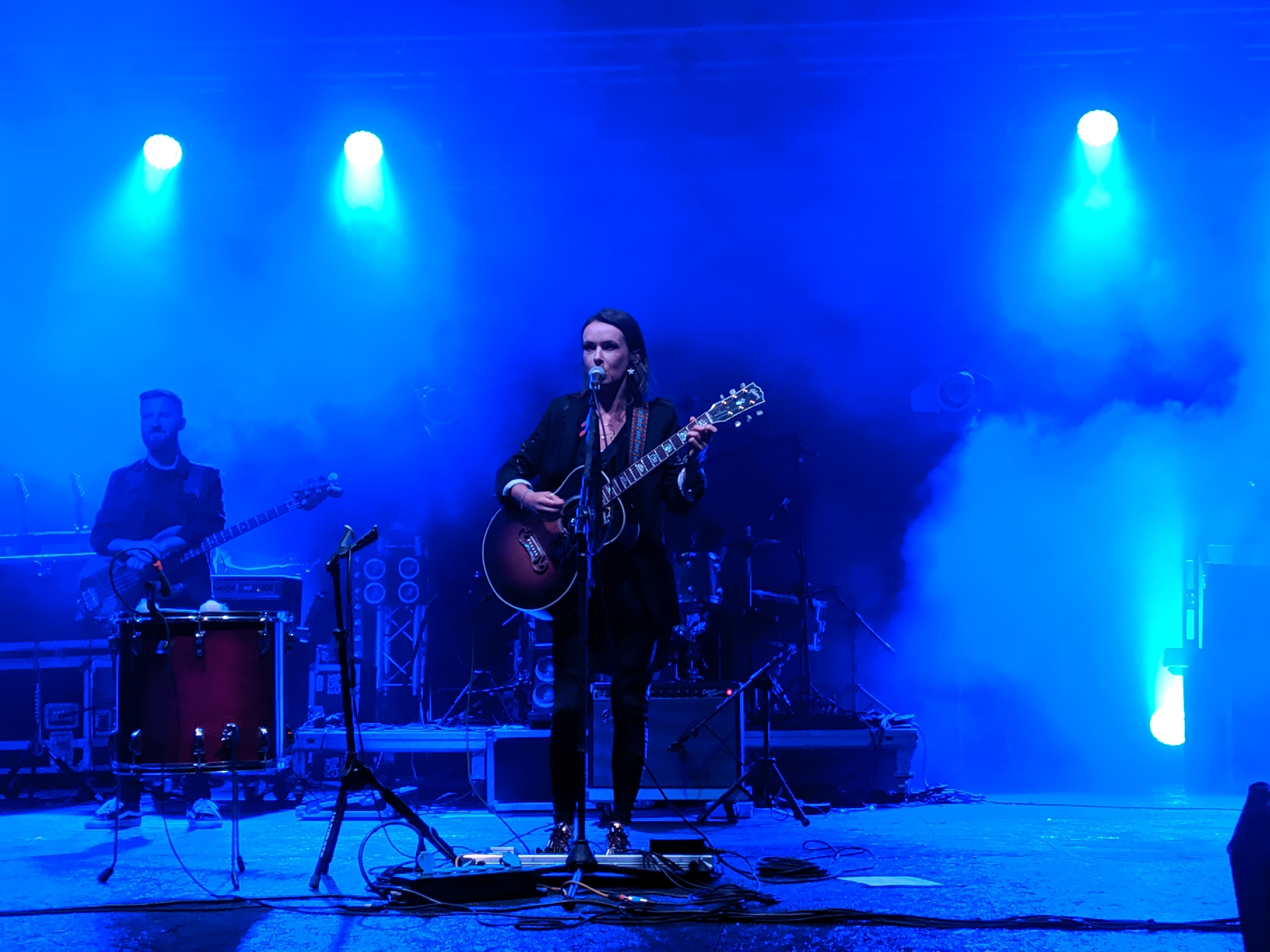
Kasia Kowalska in 2019

Kasia spent the summer on recording a new album which came out in November 2002, Antidotum (Antidote). This time Kasia worked on it with some of her good friends, respected musicians like Michal Grymuza who was also the producer of the album and Wojtek Pilichowski amongst others. The album was a motley in the rock style with a touch of electronic music here and there. It was more dynamic than the previous album. The year 2004 marks 10 years on stage for Kasia Kowalska. Instead of putting out a "best of" package, she recorded an entirely new album called Samotna w wielkim miescie (Lonely in a big city).

On 23 June 2008 she gave birth to her second child, son Ignacy Ułanowski.

In November 2008 she released album Antepenultimate promoted by the single "A Ty Czego Chcesz" ("And What Do You Want").

On 7 November 2010, together with an accompanying band, she played a concert in the studio of Agnieszka Osiecka, in which she presented her own interpretations of works by Grzegorz Ciechowski, leader of the Republika band, as well as the producer of her debut album and her musical mentor. Recordings recorded during the concert were released on the album Ciechowski. My blood.

On 12 June 2010 she unveiled the star in the Avenue of Stars at the Polish Song Festival in Opole.

At the 20th Woodstock Festival in 2014, Kasia Kowalska celebrated the 20th anniversary of her debut album. During a night concert at the Academy of Fine Arts (before the official start of the festival), she and the guests presented the most beautiful songs from the first two albums (primarily from the album Gemini) and covers of artists who inspired her over the years. It was the first "own" concert of Kasia Kowalska at the Woodstock Festival. Earlier Kasia sang on the Woodstock stage as a guest: in 2009 (in a special project Woodstock '69), as a guest of Juliette Lewis at her concert, and a year later she took part in the project "Przystanek Republika". On 27 July 2015 Kasia released the album Przystanek Woodstock 2014 (CD/DVD) which is a record of a concert from 2014.

On 16 August 2018 she performed as part of the Top of the Top Sopot Festival, performing a short recital on the occasion of the 25th anniversary of her artistic work. During the concert, she received the "Top of the Top" award for lifetime achievement.

Her fans had been waiting for 10 years for her last album Aya. It includes a song "Somewhere Inside" written by Canadian singer Alannah Myles, known for her hit "Black Velvet".

On 25 October 2019 Kasia released album MTV Unplugged, which is a record of a legendary series concert that took place on 8 May 2019 at the Shakespeare Theater in Gdańsk.

== Discography ==
Title	Album details	Peak chart positions	Sales	Certifications
Title	Album details	POL	Sales	Certifications
Gemini	Released: 18 September 1994; Label: PolyGram Poland; Formats: CD, digital download	—	POL: 400,000+	POL: 2× Platinum
Koncert inaczej	Released: 20 November 1995; Label: PolyGram Poland; Formats: CD, digital download	—	POL: 400,000+	POL: 2× Platinum
Czekając na...	Released: 30 September 1996; Label: PolyGram Poland; Formats: CD	—	POL: 200,000+	POL: Platinum
Pełna obaw	Released: 8 June 1998; Label: PolyGram Poland; Formats: CD, digital download	—	POL: 50,000+	POL: Gold
5	Released: 13 November 2000; Label: Universal Music Poland; Formats: CD, digital download	3	POL: 50,000+	POL: Gold
Antidotum	Released: 14 October 2002; Label: Universal Music Poland; Formats: CD, digital download	1	POL: 70,000+	POL: Platinum
Samotna w wielkim mieście	Released: 13 September 2004; Label: Universal Music Poland; Formats: CD, digital download	1	POL: 35,000+	POL: Gold
Antepenultimate	Released: 10 November 2008; Label: Universal Music Poland; Formats: CD, digital download	2	POL: 15,000+	POL: Gold
Ciechowski. Moja krew	Released: 29 November 2010; Label: Universal Music Poland; Formats: CD, digital download	17	POL: 30,000+	POL: Platinum
Przystanek Woodstock 2014	Released: 27 July 2015; Label: Zloty Melon	38		
AYA	Released: 22 June 2018; Label: Universal Music Poland	2	POL: 15,000+	POL: Gold
MTV Unplugged	Released: 25 October 2019; Label: Agora S.A.	11		

== Singles ==
Year	Title	positions		Album
Year	Title	POL (Airplay)	POL (NEW)	Album
1994	"Wyznanie”	–	–	Gemini
1994	"Jak rzecz”	1	–	Gemini
1995	"Kto może to dać”	–	–	Gemini
1995	"Oto ja”	2	–	Gemini
1995	"A to, co mam...”	1	–	Koncert inaczej
1996	"Chcę znać swój grzech...”	1	–	Czekając na...
1996	"Coś optymistycznego”	2	–	Czekając na...
1996	"Tak mi ciebie brak”	6	–	Czekając na...
1997	"Straciłam swój rozsądek”	3	–	Nocne graffiti
1997	"I będziesz znów kochać”	29	–	–
1998	"Co może przynieść nowy dzień”	1	–	Pełna obaw
1998	"Wyrzuć ten gniew”	18	–	Pełna obaw
1998	"Pełni obaw”	32	–	Pełna obaw
1998	"Jesteś odrobiną szczęścia”	40	–	Pełna obaw
1999	"To, co może przyjść”	39	–	Pełna obaw
2000	"Nobody”	1	–	5
2000	"Być tak blisko”	5	–	5
2001	"Będę jak”	10	–	5
2001	"Żyję raz”	–	–	5
2001	"Starczy słów”	12	–	Antidotum
2002	"Bezpowrotnie”	7	–	Antidotum
2002	"Antidotum”	4	5	Antidotum
2003	"Pieprz i sól”	4	3	Antidotum
2003	"Widzę twoją twarz”	15	–	RMF FM – Moja i twoja muzyka
2004	"To co dobre”	1	–	Samotna w wielkim mieście
2004	"Prowadź mnie”	2	–	Samotna w wielkim mieście
2005	"Domek z kart”	–	–	Samotna w wielkim mieście
2005	"Magia tych świąt”	–	–	Samotna w wielkim mieście
2007	"Dlaczego nie!”	2	–	Antepenultimate
2008	"A ty, czego chcesz?”	1	–	Antepenultimate
2009	"Miłość, trzeźwość i pokora”	35	–	Antepenultimate
2009	"Spowiedź”	1	–	Antepenultimate
2009	"Maskarada”	8	–	Antepenultimate
2010	"Baby blues”	5	–	Antepenultimate
2010	"Telefony”	–	–	Ciechowski. Moja krew
2012	"Kwiaty we włosach”	–	–	Klenczon Legenda
2016	"Aya"	–	–	AYA
2018	"Alannah (tak niewiele chcę)"	19	2	AYA
2018	"Teraz kiedy czuję”	–	–	AYA
2019	"Przebaczenia akt"	–	–	AYA
2019	"Dla Taty”	–	–	AYA
2019	"Tolerancja/na miły Bóg" (feat. Stanisław Sojka)	–	–	MTV Unplugged

== Videoclips ==
Title	Year	Album
"Wyznanie”	1994	Gemini
"Jak rzecz”	1994	Gemini
"Kto może to dać”	1994	Gemini
"Oto ja”	1995	Gemini
"A to co mam...”	1995	Koncert inaczej
"Chcę znać swój grzech”	1996	Czekając na...
"Coś optymistycznego”	1996	Czekając na...
"Tak mi ciebie brak”	1996	Czekając na...
"Straciłam swój rozsądek”	1997	Nocne graffiti (ścieżka dźwiękowa)
"Co może przynieść nowy dzień”	1998	Pełna obaw
"Wyrzuć ten gniew”	1998	Pełna obaw
"Nobody”	2000	5
"Być tak blisko”	2000	5
"Żyję raz”	2000	5
"Będę jak”	2001	5
"Starczy słów”	2001	Antidotum
"Bezpowrotnie”	2002	Antidotum
"Antidotum”	2002	Antidotum
"Pieprz i sól”	2002	Antidotum
"Widzę twoją twarz”	2003	RMF FM – moja i twoja muzyka
"To co dobre”	2004	Samotna w wielkim mieście
"Prowadź mnie”	2004	Samotna w wielkim mieście
"Dlaczego nie!”	2007	Antepenultimate
"A Ty, czego chcesz?”	2008	Antepenultimate
"Spowiedź”	2009	Antepenultimate
"Telefony”	2010	Ciechowski. Moja krew
"Kwiaty we włosach”	2012	Klenczon Legenda (ścieżka dźwiękowa)
"Aya”	2016	AYA
"Alannah (tak niewiele chcę)”	2018	AYA
"Teraz kiedy czuję”	2018	AYA
"Dla Taty”	2019	AYA
"Tolerancja/na miły Bóg”	2019	MTV Unplugged

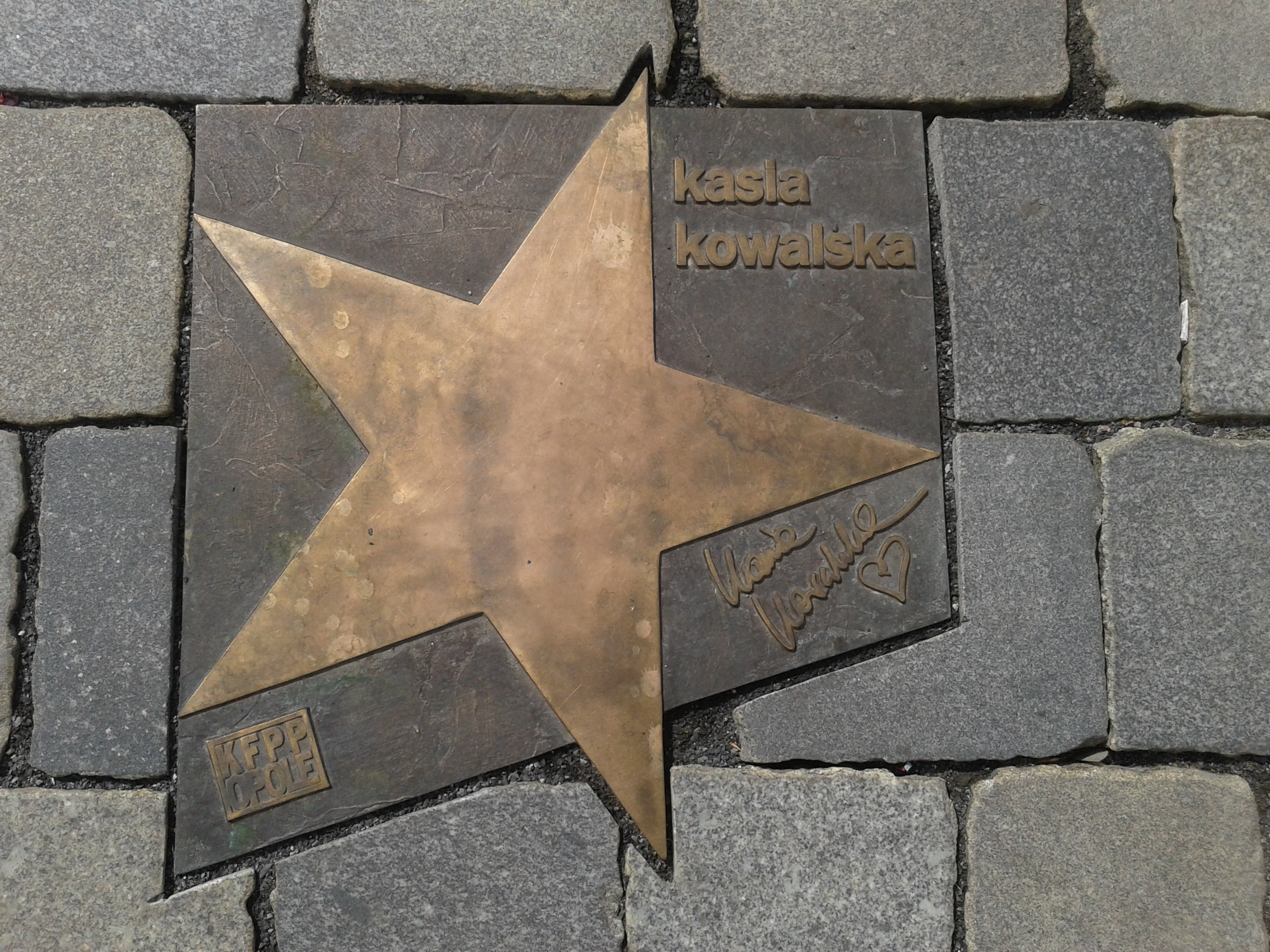

== Other videoclips ==
- 1994 – Edyta Bartosiewicz Koziorożec
- 1997 – Kasia Nosowska i Kazik Zoil
- 2005 – Krzysztof Kiljański i Kayah Prócz ciebie nic
- 2012 – Hey Wilk vs kot (impresja Marcina Żabiełowicza)

== Other singles and projects ==
- 1992 – "Hearts" from Genoside Flood and Field (For the Common Man)
- 1992 – "The Road", "Epiloque", "Tears for Sorrow", "Song for You" from Talking Pictures Talking Pictures
- 1993 – "Demon", "Moja modlitwa", "E-77", "Krzyczę", "Deszczowa piosenka" from Fatum Demon
- 1994 – "No Woman No Cry" from Hetman Co jest Grane !?
- 1994 – "Gdybyś kochał hej", "Umówiłem się z nim na dziewiątą" from Piersi i przyjaciele 60/70
- 1995 – "Modlitwa III – pozwól mi" from Dżem List do R. na 12 głosów vol. 2
- 1995 – "Ave Maria”
- 1995 – "Zgubiony dom" – Awantura o Basię
- 1996 – "Modlitwa Esmeraldy" – Dzwonnik z Notre Dame
- 1999 – "Mniejsze zło" from Lato Przyjaźń Coca-Cola
- 1999 – "Powiedz ile" z from Energy Energy
- 1999 – "Chcę zatrzymać ten czas"
- 1999 – "Cicha noc”
- 2000 – "Jak w taki dzień deszczowy", "Radość najpiękniejszych lat" from Tyle słońca
- 2001 – "Żyć coraz pewniej" from Claudia – miłość rozkwita latem
- 2001 – "Goo Goo", "Masz odwagę" from Wojciech Pilichowski Pi
- 2002 – "Pomóż mi”
- 2009 – "Gdybyś kochał, hej!", "Poszłabym za tobą", "W co mam wierzyć" from Breakout Festiwal 2007 – Wysłuchaj mojej pieśni Panie
- 2009 – "Proud Mary", "Whom The Bells Tolls"from 40 lat Woodstock
- 2010 – "Twój czas"
- 2011 – "Tak, tak... to ja!", "Nie pytaj o Polskę" from Projekt Republika – Przystanek Woodstock 2011
- 2012 – "Kwiaty we włosach" from Klenczon Legenda
- 2012 – "Dni, których nie znamy" from PR3, Święta bez granic
- 2012 – "Ikar"
- 2013 – "Niezłomni" from Panny wyklęte
- 2014 – "Wstań i walcz" from Panny wyklęte: wygnane vol. 1
- 2017 – "Straciłam swój rozsądek (live)" from Wojciech Pilichowski – 25 Lat Koncert W Trójce
- 2018 – "Zamki na piasku", "Mniej niż zero" from LP1 Lady Pank i goście
- 2018 – "Trawnik" Tulia

== Filmography ==
- 1997 – Nocne graffiti

Awards and achievements
Preceded by Justyna with "Sama"	Poland in the Eurovision Song Contest; 1996	Succeeded by Anna Maria Jopek with "Ale jestem"
