= Zofia Chomętowska =

Polish photographer

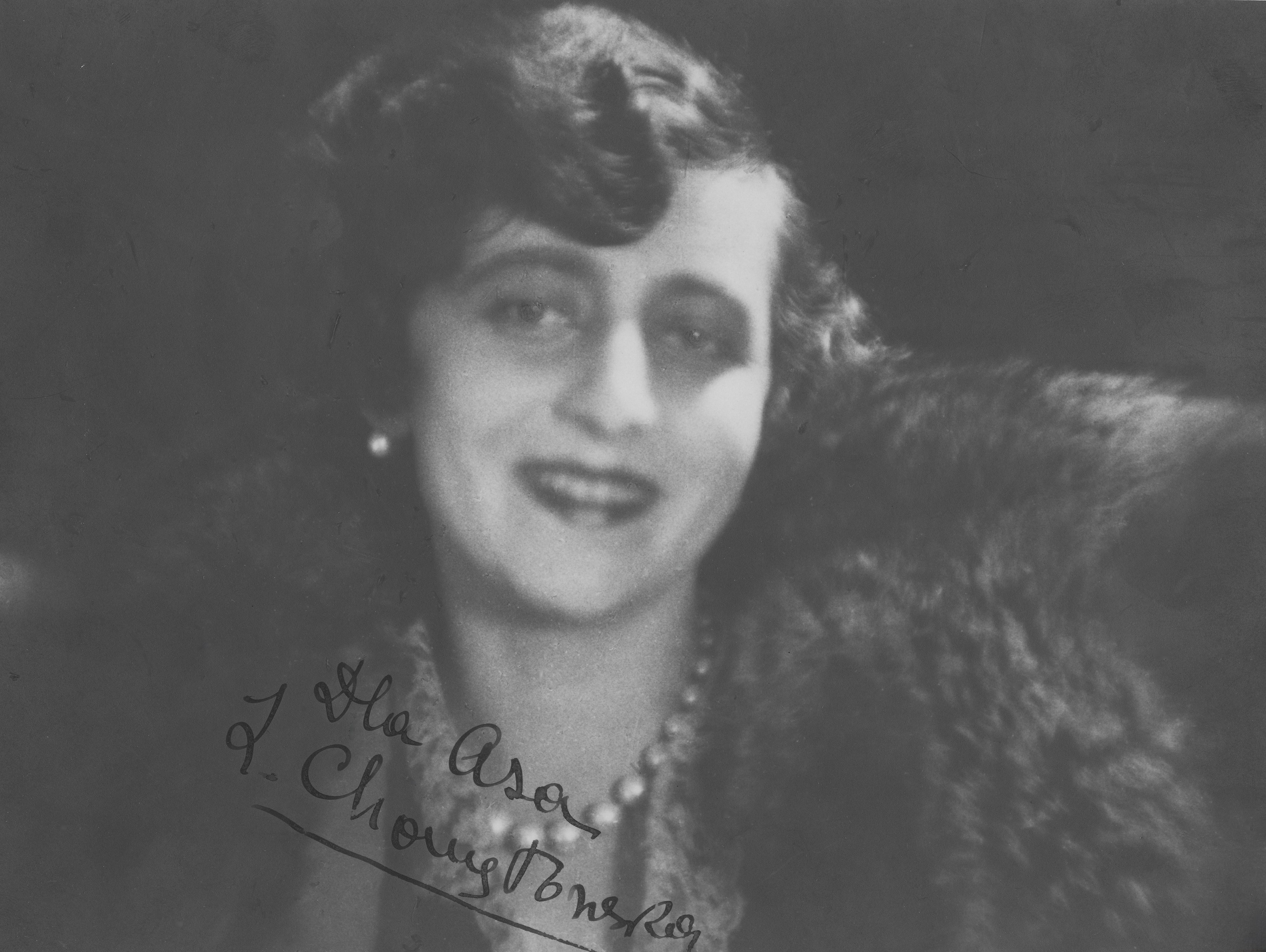
Zofia Chomętowska in 1925

Zofia Katarzyna Chomętowska (née Drucka-Lubecka; first marriage Czechowicz-Lachowicka; second marriage Chomętowska; born 8 December 1902 in Parochońsk near Pińsk; died 20 May 1991 in Buenos Aires) was a Polish photographer.

== Biography ==
Chomętowska was born into the aristocratic Drucki-Lubecki family, the daughter of Feliks Drucki-Lubecki and Bronisława Buchowiecka. She grew up on the family estate in Parochońsk in the Polesie region. She completed French secondary school in Saint Petersburg.

From 1928 she worked with a 35 mm Leica camera. In 1937 she was admitted as a member of the Polish Photoclub, and between 1938 and 1939 she was also a member of the Warsaw Photoclub. She was a member of the Polish Photographic Society and in 1939 was elected to its final board before the outbreak of World War II.

Her documentary photographs were presented at the exhibition Warsaw Yesterday, Today and Tomorrow, organised in 1939 at the National Museum in Warsaw by the city’s mayor Stefan Starzyński. Her work was published in periodicals including the weekly magazine Świat and exhibited in Poland and abroad.

Together with Tadeusz Przypkowski, Chomętowska served as a photographic contributor to the exhibition Warsaw Accuses (1945), the first post-war Polish photographic exhibition. It was shown at the National Museum in Warsaw, in other Polish cities, and internationally, documenting the destruction of Warsaw during the Second World War and the return of its inhabitants. Several of these prints documenting everyday life in post-war Warsaw are held and described by the Museum of Warsaw.

Negatives salvaged from the Warsaw Uprising were donated by the photographer to the Museum of Warsaw. After the war, approximately 5,000 negatives dating from 1923–1939 and 1945–1947 entered the museum’s collection. Negatives depicting primarily the eastern borderlands were given to Emilia Borecka, organiser of the first post-war exhibition Half a Century of Warsaw in the Photography of Zofia Chomętowska.

In 1947 Chomętowska emigrated to Argentina. She returned to Warsaw for a visit in 1971. She was buried at Powązki Cemetery in Warsaw. In 2010, her photographic archive was repatriated to Poland.

== Personal life ==
On 3 September 1919, she married Władysław Czechowicz-Lachowicki (of the Ostoja coat of arms). After the annulment of this marriage, on 25 September 1929 she married Jakub Chomętowski (of the Lis coat of arms), from whom she divorced in 1939.
