= American nationalism =

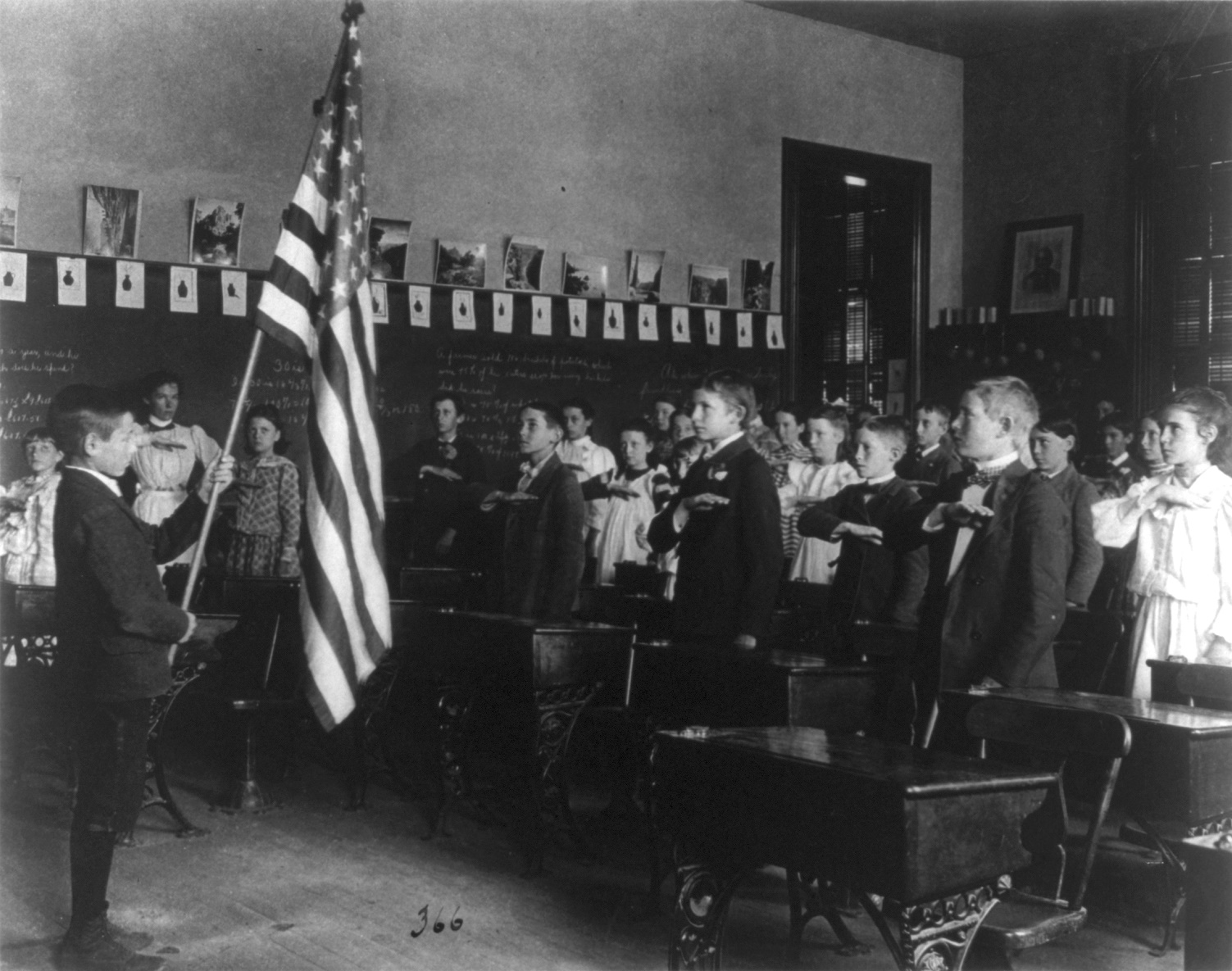
Schoolchildren in the United States reciting the Pledge of Allegiance in 1899

American nationalism is a form of nationalism in the United States that, as a movement or ideology, views Americans as a nation that should be congruent with and represented by the government of the United States, and it supports what it perceives to be the interests of that nation. It can be subject to civic, cultural, or economic influences. Essentially, it indicates the aspects that characterize and distinguish the United States as an autonomous political community. The term often explains efforts to reinforce its national identity and self-determination within its national and international affairs.

American nationalism has found expression throughout American history. The first Naturalization Act of 1790 passed by Congress and signed into law by George Washington defined American identity and citizenship on racial lines, declaring that only "free white men of good character" could become citizens, and denying citizenship to enslaved black people and anyone of non-European stock; thus it was a form of ethnic nationalism. Some American scholars have argued that the United States government institutionalized a civic nationalism founded upon legal and rational concepts of citizenship, being based on common language and cultural traditions, and that the Founding Fathers of the United States established the country upon liberal and individualist principles.

== History ==
=== Colonial ===
The United States traces its origins to the Thirteen Colonies founded by Britain in the 17th and early 18th century. Residents identified with Britain until the mid-18th century when the first sense of being "American" emerged. The Albany Plan proposed a union between the colonies in 1754. Although unsuccessful, it served as a reference for future discussions of independence.

John Trumbull's Declaration of Independence is often identified as a depiction of the signing of the Declaration, but it actually shows the five person drafting committee presenting its work to the Second Continental Congress.

=== American Revolution ===
Soon afterward, the colonies faced several common grievances over acts passed by the British Parliament, including taxation without representation. Americans were in general agreement that only their own colonial legislatures—and not Parliament in London—could pass internal taxes. Parliament vigorously insisted otherwise and no compromise was found. The London government punished Boston for the Boston Tea Party, and the Thirteen Colonies united and formed the Continental Congress, which lasted from 1774 to 1789. Fighting broke out in 1775 and the sentiment swung to independence in early 1776, influenced significantly by the appeal to American nationalism by Thomas Paine. His pamphlet Common Sense was a runaway best seller in 1776, read aloud in taverns and coffee houses. Congress unanimously issued a Declaration of Independence announcing a new nation of independent states had formed, the United States of America. American Patriots won the American Revolutionary War and received generous peace terms from Britain in 1783. The minority of Loyalists (loyal to King George III) could remain or leave, but about 80% remained and became full American citizens. Frequent parades along with new rituals and ceremonies—and a new flag—provided popular occasions for expressing a spirit of American nationalism.

The new nation operated under the very weak national government set up by the Articles of Confederation, and most Americans prioritized their state over the nation. Nationalists led by George Washington, Alexander Hamilton, and James Madison had Congress call a constitutional convention in 1787. It produced the Constitution for a strong national government which was debated in every state and unanimously adopted. It went into effect in 1789 as the first modern constitutional liberal democracy based on the consent of the governed, with Washington as the first President.

=== Westward Expansion ===
In an 1858 speech, future President Abraham Lincoln alluded to a form of American civic nationalism originating from the tenets of the Declaration of Independence as a force for national unity in the United States, stating that it was a method for uniting diverse peoples of different ethnic ancestries into a common nationality:

If they look back through this history to trace their connection with those days by blood, they find they have none, they cannot carry themselves back into that glorious epoch and make themselves feel that they are part of us, but when they look through that old Declaration of Independence they find that those old men say that "We hold these truths to be self-evident, that all men are created equal", and then they feel that moral sentiment taught in that day evidences their relation to those men, that it is the father of all moral principle in them, and that they have a right to claim it as though they were blood of the blood, and flesh of the flesh of the men who wrote the Declaration, and so they are. That is the electric cord in that Declaration that links the hearts of patriotic and liberty-loving men together, that will link those patriotic hearts as long as the love of freedom exists in the minds of men throughout the world.

— Abraham Lincoln, address to Chicagoan voters, July 10, 1858

=== American Civil War ===
White Northerners increasingly felt alienated; they saw themselves as becoming second-class citizens as aggressive slaveholders (and their Northern allies) tried to block their access to the fast-growing western territories. Meanwhile, Southerners questioned whether their loyalty to the nation trumped their commitment to their state and their way of life since it was so intimately bound up with slavery and whether they could enslave people. A sense of Southern nationalism was starting to emerge; however, it was rudimentary as late as 1860 when the election of Lincoln was a signal for most of the slave states in the South to secede and form a new nation. The Confederate government insisted the nationalism was real and imposed increasing burdens on the population in the name of independence and nationalism. The fierce combat record of the Confederates demonstrates their commitment to the death for independence. The government and army refused to compromise and were militarily overwhelmed in 1865. By the 1890s, the white South felt vindicated through its belief in the newly constructed memory of the Lost Cause of the Confederacy. The North came to accept or at least tolerate racial segregation and disfranchisement of black voters in the South. The spirit of American nationalism had returned to Dixie.

=== Reconstruction, Gilded Age and Progressive Era ===
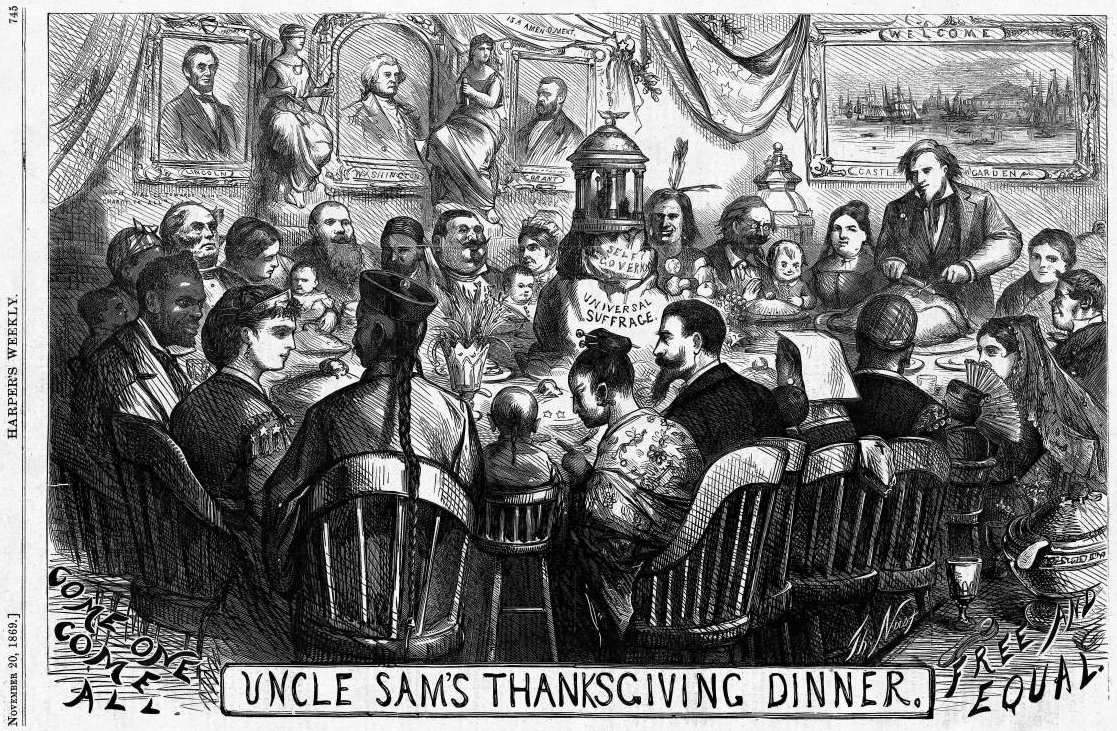
An 1869 Thomas Nast cartoon espousing American exceptionalism shows Americans of different ancestries and ethnic backgrounds sit together at a dinner table with Columbia to enjoy a Thanksgiving meal as equal members of the American citizenry while Uncle Sam prepares and sets the table, thus espousing an inclusive form of American nationalism that is civic, where membership in the nation is not dependent upon ethnicity.

The North's triumph in the American Civil War marked a significant transition in American national identity. The ratification of the Fourteenth Amendment settled the fundamental question of national identity, such as the criteria for becoming a citizen of the United States. Everyone born in the territorial boundaries of the United States or those areas and subject to its jurisdiction was an American citizen, regardless of ethnicity or social status (indigenous people on reservations became citizens in 1924, while indigenous people off reservations had always been citizens).

In the early 20th century, one of the highest-profile advocates for American nationalism was Theodore Roosevelt. Roosevelt's policies both at home and abroad, which came to be known as the New Nationalism, included an element of a strong national identity. He insisted that one had to be 100% American, not a hyphenated American who juggled multiple loyalties.

With a fast-growing industrial economy, immigrants were welcome from Europe, Canada, Mexico, and Cuba, and millions came. Becoming a full citizen was easy, requiring the completion of paperwork over five years. However, new Asian arrivals were not welcome. The U.S. imposed restrictions on most Chinese immigrants in the 1880s and informal restrictions on most Japanese in 1907. By 1924, it was difficult for any Asian to enter the United States, but children born in the United States to Asian parents were full citizens. The restrictions were ended on the Chinese in the 1940s and on other Asians in 1965.

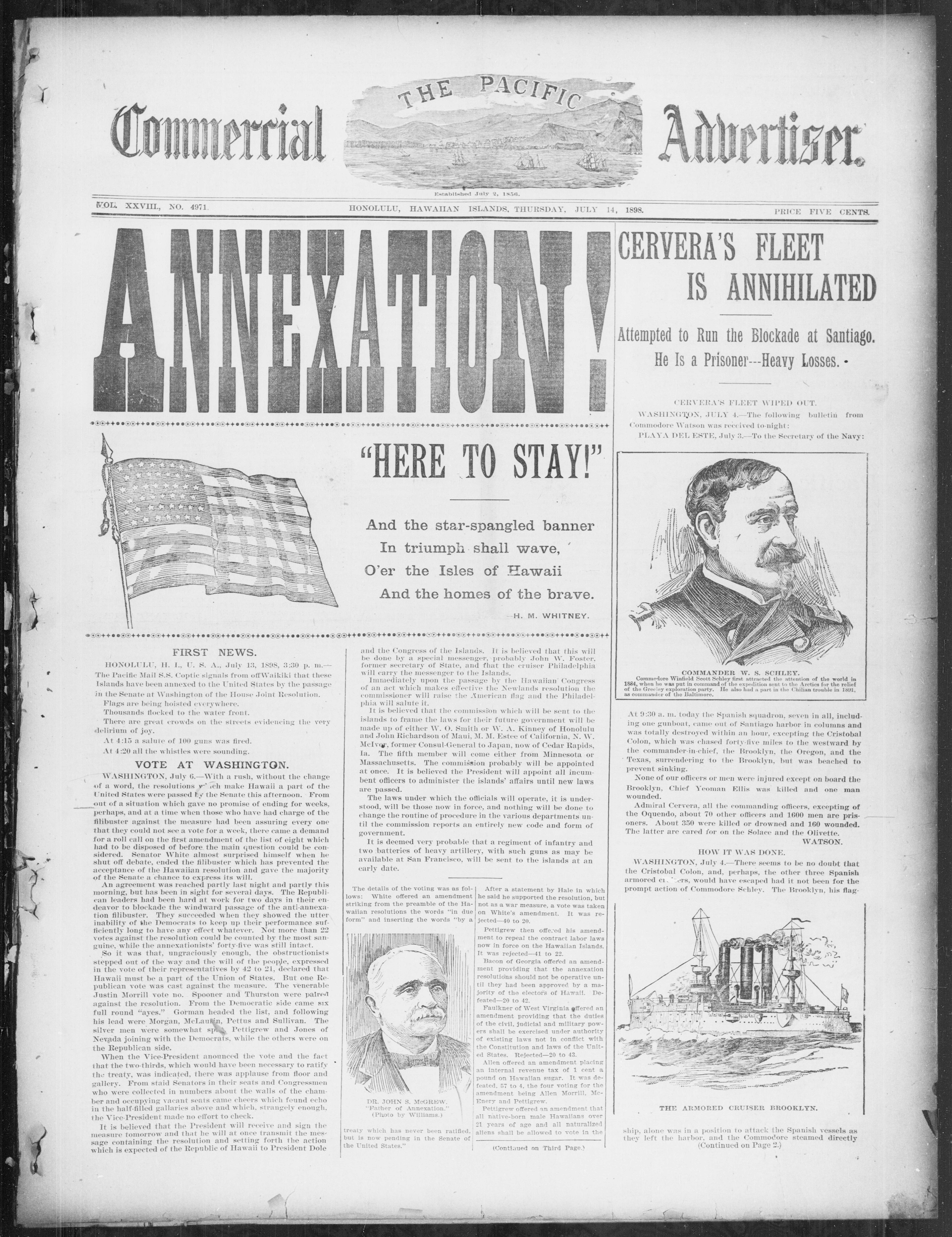
Newspaper reporting the annexation of the Republic of Hawaii in 1898

=== World Wars and interwar period ===
After the United States entered World War I, nationalism surged. Americans enlisted in the military en masse, motivated by propaganda and war films. There was very little resistance to conscription.

By the First World War, many native-born Protestants were skeptical of recent immigrants to the United States, who were often Catholic or Jewish and spoke languages other than English in their daily lives. There was a strong belief among many in favor of "one hundred percent Americanism", in contrast to "hyphenated Americanism". This was exemplified by the film The Birth of a Nation in 1915 and the rise of the Ku Klux Klan in the 1910s and 20s. In the early- to-mid 20th century, public school education became compulsory in many jurisdictions, with parochial schools being restricted or outlawed. The school day typically began with the Pledge of Allegiance. It was in this milieu that the Immigration Act of 1924 was passed to regulate immigration from Southern and Eastern Europe. However, during this period, citizenship was also extended to Native Americans, both on- and off-reservation, for the first time.

World War II led to unprecedented nationalism in the United States. After the 1941 Attack on Pearl Harbor, many Americans enlisted in the military. During the war, much of American life centered on contributing to the war effort, mainly through volunteer efforts, entry into the labor force, rationing, price controls, and income saving. Citizens willingly accepted these sacrifices out of a sense of nationalism, feeling they were for the greater good. Even members of anti-war groups like the pacifist churches, anti-war movement, and conscientious objectors abandoned their pacifism for the sake of the war, feeling that World War II was a just war.

=== Cold War ===
Following World War II and beginning with the Cold War, the United States emerged as a world superpower and abandoned its traditional policy of isolationism in favor of interventionism. With this, nationalism took on a new form in the U.S., as Americans began to view their country as a world police with the ultimate goal of eradicating communism from the world. This nationalist fervor was fueled by US involvement in the Korean War, Vietnam War, Bay of Pigs Invasion, and many other conflicts.

=== Modern era ===
The September 11 attacks of 2001 led to a wave of nationalist expression in the United States. The start of the war on terror was accompanied by a rise in military enlistment that included not only lower-income Americans but also middle-class and upper-class citizens. This nationalism continued long into the War in Afghanistan and Iraq War.

== Contemporary United States ==
Nationalism and Americanism remain topics in the modern United States. Political scientist Paul McCartney, for instance, argues that as a nation defined by a creed and sense of mission, Americans tend to equate their interests with those of humanity, which informs their global posture. In some instances, it may be considered a form of ethnocentrism and American exceptionalism.

Due to the distinctive circumstances involved throughout history in American politics, its nationalism has developed concerning loyalty to a set of liberal, universal political ideals and perceived accountability to propagate those principles globally. Acknowledging the conception of the United States as accountable for spreading liberal change and promoting democracy throughout the world's politics and governance has defined practically all of American foreign policy. Therefore, democracy promotion is not just another measure of foreign policy, but it is instead the fundamental characteristic of their national identity and political determination.

== Varieties of American nationalism ==
In a 2016 paper in the American Sociological Review, "Varieties of American Popular Nationalism", sociologists Bart Bonikowski and Paul DiMaggio report on research findings supporting the existence of at least four kinds of American nationalists, including, groups which range from the smallest to the largest: (1) the disengaged, (2) creedal or civic nationalists, (3) ardent nationalists, and (4) restrictive nationalists.

Bonikowski and Dimaggio's analysis of these four groups found that ardent nationalists made up about 24% of their study, and they comprised the largest of the two groups Bonikowski and Dimaggio consider "extreme". Members of this group closely identified with the United States, were very proud of their country and strongly associated themselves with factors of national hubris. They felt that a "true American" must speak English and live in the U.S. for most of their life. Fewer, but 75%, believe that a "true American" must be a Christian, and 86% believe a "true American" must be born in the country. Further, ardent nationalists thought that Jews, Muslims, agnostics and naturalized citizens were something less than genuinely American. The second class, Bonikowski and DiMaggio considered "extreme", was the smallest of the four classes because its members comprised 17% of their respondents. The disengaged showed low pride in the government institutions, and they did not fully identify with the United States. Their lack of pride extended to American democracy, American history, political equality in the U.S., and the country's political influence. This group was the least nationalistic of all of the four groups which they identified.

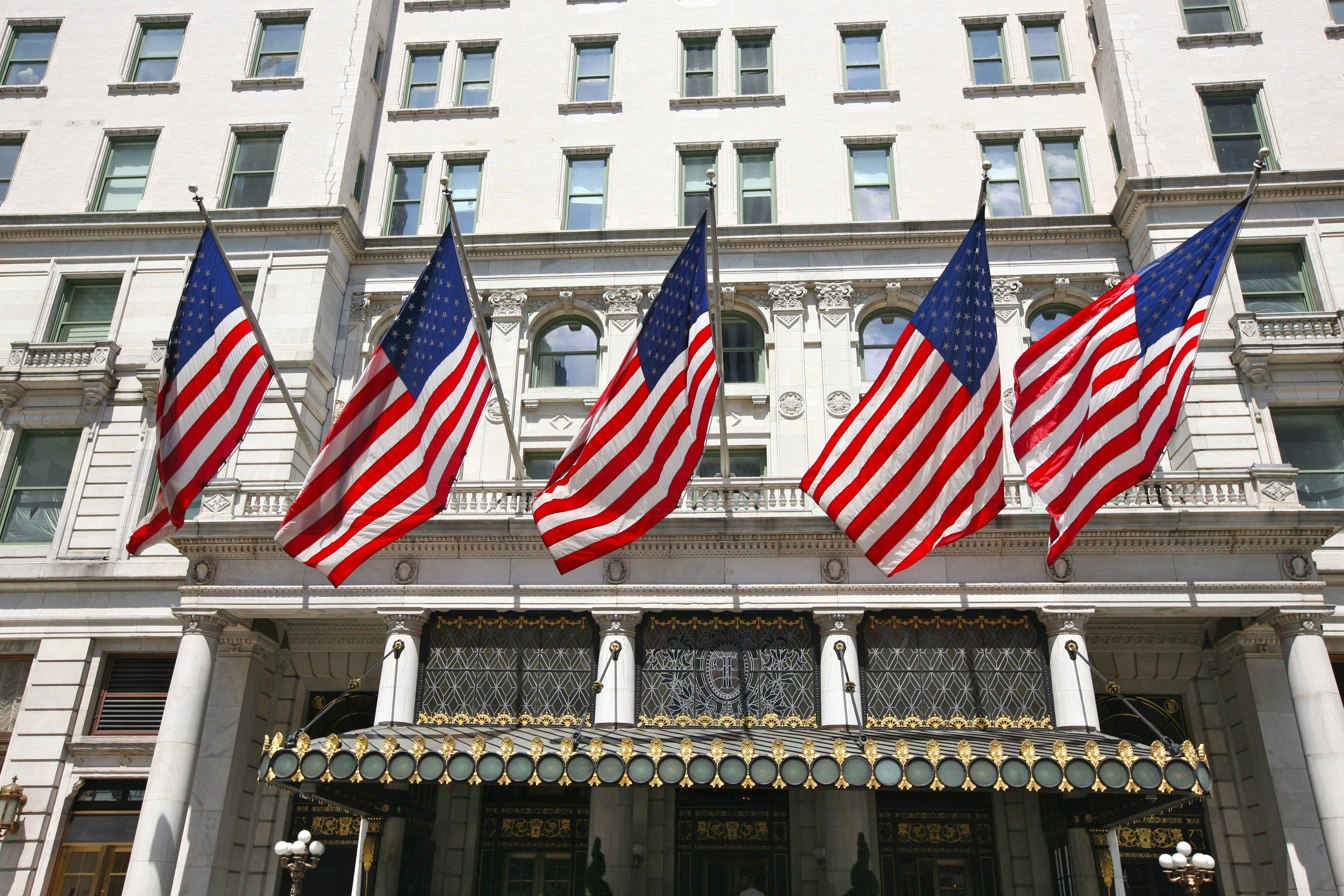
Studies supported the idea that the American flag increased nationalism.

The two remaining classes were less homogeneous in their responses than the ardent nationalists and disengaged were. Restrictive nationalists had low levels of pride in America and its institutions, but they defined a "true American" in ways that were markedly "exclusionary". This group was the largest of the four because its members comprised 38% of the study's respondents. While their levels of national identification and pride were moderate, they espoused beliefs that caused them to hold restrictive definitions of "true Americans"; for instance, their definitions excluded non-Christians."

The final group to be identified was creedal nationalists (also known as civic nationalists), whose members made up 22% of the study's respondents who were studied. This group believed in liberal values, was proud of the United States, and its members held the fewest restrictions on who could be considered a true American. They closely identified with their country, which they felt "very close" to, and were proud of its achievements. Bonikowski and Dimaggio dubbed the group "creedal" because their beliefs most closely approximated the precepts of what is widely considered the American creed.

As part of their findings, the authors report that the connection between big money, religious belief, and national identity is significant. The belief that being a Christian is an integral part of what it means to be a "true American" is the most significant factor which separates the creedal nationalists and the disengaged from the restrictive and ardent nationalists. They also determined that their groupings cut across partisan boundaries, and they also help to explain what they perceive is the recent success of populist, nativist, and racist rhetoric in American politics.

According to a 2021 American Journal of Sociology study by Bart Bonikowski, Yuval Feinstein, and Sean Bock, competing understandings of American nationhood had emerged in the United States in the prior two decades. They find, "nationalism has become sorted by party, as Republican identifiers have come to define America in more exclusionary and critical terms and Democrats have increasingly endorsed inclusive and positive conceptions of nationhood."

=== Cultural nationalism ===
Cultural nationalism has historically been an integral element of American nationalism. Such cultural nationalists form group allegiances based on a common cultural heritage rather than race or political party. This heritage may include culture (Culture of the United States), language (English language), religion (Christianity), history (History of the United States), ideology (Democracy), and symbols (National symbols of the United States). Cultural nationalism is distinct from ethnic nationalism, in which race and ethnicity are emphasized over culture and language.

Nationalism gained a cultural character beginning in the late 18th century. Multiple historical ideas have shaped modern cultural nationalism in the U.S., including the concept of the nation state, the fusion of nationalism and religion into religious nationalism, and identity politics.

=== Civic nationalism ===
American nationalism sometimes takes the form of Civic nationalism, a liberal form of nationalism based on values such as freedom, equality, and individual rights. Civic nationalists view nationhood as a political identity. They argue that liberal democratic principles and loyalty define a civic nation. Membership is open to every citizen, regardless of culture, ethnicity, or language, as long as they believe in these values.

=== Christian nationalism ===
Christian nationalism is a belief that asserts that the United States was founded strictly by and for Christians and therefore should prioritize their interests in all social and political spheres. Christian nationalists in the United States advocate "a fusion of identitarian Christian identity and cultural conservatism with American civic belonging". This "pervasive ideology" is supported by ideological values and historical narratives that center on preserving and "restoring" such beliefs to preeminence within America. It has been noted to bear overlap with white supremacy, Christian supremacy, the Seven Mountain Mandate movement, and dominionism. Most researchers have described Christian nationalism as "authoritarian" and "boundary-enforcing", but recent research has focused on how libertarian, small-government ideology and neoliberal political economics have become part of the American Christian nationalist political identity.

=== Trump era ===
President Donald Trump was described as a nationalist, and he embraced the term himself. Researchers describe the Republican Party in the 21st century as becoming right-wing populist and nationalist, more specifically classified as neo-nationalist, (Note: The GOP is classified as populist-nationalist, more specifically neo-nationalist.) with strongly anti-pluralist, white nationalist and ethnonationalist themes. Several officials within his administration were described as representing a "nationalist wing" within the federal government, including former White House Chief Strategist Steve Bannon, Senior Advisor to the President Stephen Miller, Director of the National Trade Council Peter Navarro, former Deputy Assistant to the President Sebastian Gorka, Special Assistant to the President Julia Hahn, former Deputy Assistant to the President for Strategic Communications Michael Anton, Secretary of State Mike Pompeo, Secretary of Commerce Wilbur Ross, Trade Representative Robert Lighthizer, former acting Director of National Intelligence Richard Grenell, former National Security Advisor John R. Bolton and former National Security Advisor Michael Flynn.

In a February 2017 article in The Atlantic, journalist Uri Friedman described "populist economic nationalist" as a new nationalist movement "modeled on the 'populism' of the 19th-century U.S. President Andrew Jackson" which was introduced in Trump's remarks to the Republican National Convention in a speech written by Stephen Miller and Steve Bannon. Miller had adopted Senator Jeff Sessions' form of "nation-state populism" while working as his aide. By September 2017, The Washington Post journalist Greg Sargent observed that "Trump's nationalism" as "defined" by Bannon, Breitbart, Miller and "the rest of the 'populist economic nationalist' contingent around Trump" was beginning to have wavering support among Trump voters. Some Republican members of Congress were also described as nationalists during the Trump era, such as Representative Steve King, Representative Matt Gaetz, Senator Tom Cotton and Senator Josh Hawley.

During the Trump era, commonly identified American nationalist political commentators included Rush Limbaugh, Ann Coulter, Michelle Malkin, Lou Dobbs, Alex Jones, Charlie Kirk, Laura Ingraham, Candace Owens, Michael Savage, Tucker Carlson, Mike Cernovich, and Nick Fuentes.

== See also ==
- American ancestry
- American conservatism
- American exceptionalism
- American literary nationalism
- American nativism
- American nationalism and sport
- American neo-nationalism
- American patriotism
- Americanism
- Americanization
- Americentrism
- Christian Patriot
- Melting Pot
- National symbols of the United States
- Paleoconservatism
- Patriot movement
- Propaganda in the United States
- Pax Americana
- Salad bowl (cultural idea)
- United States militarism
- United States non-interventionism
- White nationalism in the United States

=== Historical movements ===
- Manifest Destiny
- New Nationalism (Theodore Roosevelt)
- American nationalist poets Walt Whitman and Langston Hughes

=== Laws ===
- Emergency Quota Act
- Immigration Act of 1924
