= Brodzik =

Brodzic coat of arms used by some of Brodzik family

Brodzik is a Polish surname.

Archaic feminine forms are Brodzikowa (by husband), Brodzikówna (by father); they still can be used colloquially. Some of them use Brodzic coat of arms.

Notable people with this surname include the following:

- Elwira Mejk, born Elwira Smilgin-Brodzik, Polish disco polo singer
- Joanna Brodzik (born 1973), Polish actress
- Martyna Brodzik (born 2001), Polish footballer

== See also ==
- Brodzikowo, a settlement in Mrągowo County, Warmian-Masurian Voivodeship, northern Poland
- Brodziak
- Brodzki
