= Bońkowski =

Brodzic coat of arms used by some of Bońkowski family

Bońkowski (feminine: Bońkowska) is a Polish surname. It may be transliterated as Bonkowsky, Bonkovsky, Bonkovski, Bonikowski or Bonkowski (Russian: Баньковский, Russian: Боньковский). Some of them use Brodzic, Gryf, Korab or Prus coat of arms. Notable people with the surname include:

- Bart Bonikowski, American sociologist
- Basia Bonkowski (died 2022) also known as Basia Rendall, Australian television presenter, television producer and author
- Charles Bonkowski (1841–1905), Ottoman chemist and physician of Polish heritage
- Denys Fedorovych Bonkovsky
- Hieronim Napoleon Bońkowski (1807–1886), Polish insurgent, emigrant, historian, researcher of Slavic studies
- Ignacy Bonawentura Bońkowski of the Korab coat of arms (1798–1884), Polish lawyer, civil servant, civil governor of Płock, member of the Senate, state councilor
- Joe Bonikowski (born 1941), American former baseball pitcher
- Józef Bońkowski (died 1809) – Polish nobleman, member of Sejm, Knight of the Order of Saint Stanislaus
- Michael Bonkowski, German herpetologist
- Robert Bońkowski, Polish Slavic linguist, professor at the University of Silesia in Katowice
- Ronald L. Bonkowski (1938–2000), American politician, Mayor of Warren, Michigan
- Szczepan Bońkowski (1879–1956), Polish educator and educational activist[2].
- Waldemar Bonkowski (born 1959), Polish politician, member of the Senate
- Władysław Bońkowski(died 1965), Polish Righteous Among the Nations

== Other ==
- Bonkowski's gecko, species of lizard
- Bonkowski's slender gecko
