= Rywin affair =

Corruption scandal in Poland

The Rywin affair (Polish: afera Rywina), also known as the Rywingate, was a corruption scandal in Poland, which began in late 2002 while the post-communist government of the SLD (Democratic Left Alliance) was in power. It is named after Polish film producer Lew Rywin, who was a key figure.

== Chain of events ==
On 22 July 2002, Lew Rywin called at the office of Adam Michnik, editor of Poland's largest daily newspaper, Gazeta Wyborcza. Rywin sought a bribe of 17.5 million USD to arrange a change to a draft law aimed at limiting the print media's influence on radio and television, which would have been in Michnik's favour; the original draft would have prevented the paper's publishing house, Agora S.A. from taking over the private TV station Polsat or the second channel of Poland's public TV broadcaster Telewizja Polska. Rywin said he was acting on behalf of what he called a "group in power" which wanted to remain anonymous but possibly included then prime minister Leszek Miller of the post-communist Alliance of the Democratic Left.

Michnik secretly recorded the conversation and started investigations to establish the identity of the "group in power". He also arranged a meeting between Miller, Rywin, and himself in Miller's office. When Miller denied any involvement in the deal Rywin had put forward, according to the others present, Rywin lost his composure and even spoke of committing suicide. Rywin himself later claimed to have been under the influence of alcohol.

Only after Gazeta Wyborcza's investigations had remained inconclusive, on 27 December 2002 – six months after the incident, which cast some doubts on the real role of the newspaper in the affair – the paper printed the partial record of Michnik's conversation with Rywin, igniting the scandal. However, other papers had reported parts of the story earlier (e.g. weekly magazine Wprost)

In January 2003, the Polish parliament (Sejm) created a special committee to conduct an investigation into the circumstances of the affair. A separate penal prosecution resulted in Rywin being sentenced to two years in prison and a 100,000 złoty fine on 26 April 2004 for fraud, as the court concluded that the "group in power" did not exist and Rywin had been acting on his own initiative. On 10 December 2004, the Warsaw court of appeals repealed this sentence, sentencing Rywin to a reduced term of two years for "paid protection" on behalf of a still anonymous group.

== Contradictory conclusions ==
In the meantime, the protracted hearings of the Sejm's special committee continued. On April 5, 2004 the committee officially finished proceedings. With a majority vote supported by the SLD and Samoobrona deputies to the committee, it came to the same conclusion as the penal court, according to which Rywin had been acting completely on his own.

However, the dissenting minority, including committee chairman Tomasz Nałęcz, refused to back the report and began to compile minority reports. The Sejm then had to decide whether to accept the committee's official final report or one of the various minority reports as the outcome of the investigation. On September 24, 2004, the Sejm unexpectedly voted to accept the minority report that most radically departed from the majority report, and named the following people as the masterminds behind Rywin's mission:

- prime minister Leszek Miller (stepped down in May 2004)
- Aleksandra Jakubowska, deputy minister of culture in Miller's government, who was also in charge of the amendment of the law that could have benefited Agora S.A.
- Włodzimierz Czarzasty, another high-ranking SLD media policy-maker
- Robert Kwiatkowski, head of the Polish national public TV broadcaster Telewizja Polska, the second channel of which was proposed to be privatized and a possible target for an Agora S.A. takeover
- Lech Nikolski, Miller's Chief of Cabinet, later in charge of the Polish EU membership referendum as minister without portfolio.

== Long-term impact on political culture ==
Former dissident Adam Michnik's reputation was damaged, as he was suspected to be more deeply entangled in the scandal, although in what way remains unclear. His friendly relations with members of the former communist political establishment were exposed. This increased the numbers of Poles who are convinced that politicians and opinion-leaders are involved with the large-scale shadow economy.

The right-wing party Law and Justice, whose defining themes are the fight against crime and corruption, benefited from the affair, which raised its public profile. The party's deputy Zbigniew Ziobro authored the radical minority report which the Sejm passed.

The scandal was a major factor in the SLD's severe defeat at the 2005 elections. It declined to the point that it was swept out of the Sejm altogether in 2015. The party returned to the legislature four years later, and has since renamed itself New Left. The party would not return to government until 2023, when it became a junior partner in a broad pro-European coalition headed by Donald Tusk.
