= Ewa Brodzka =

Polish film director

- Born: 15 January 1959 (age 67)
- Occupation: Film Maker

Ewa Brodzka is a Polish film maker, production manager, assistant director, second unit director, television director, and casting director. She has worked on many Polish feature films and television series. Notable is her working relationship as first assistant director and production manager with Academy Award winning director Andrzej Wajda. She has worked on many international productions made in Poland including Roman Polanski's The Pianist and Steven Spielberg's Schindler's List.

She is married to film director Marek Brodzki.

== Selected filmography ==
Feature films:

- 2009 Tatarak - with director Andrzej Wajda - Production Manager, Casting Director
- 2007 Katyń - Academy Award nominated film with director Andrzej Wajda - Second Unit Director, Casting Director
- 2007 Jutro Idziemy Do Kina - award-winning film with director Michał Kwieciński - Second Unit Director, Casting Director
- 2006 Strike (Strajk) - with director Volker Schlöndorff - Casting Director
- 2003 The Revenge (Zemsta) - with director Andrzej Wajda - Asst. Director
- 2002 The Pianist - with director Roman Polanski - Second Asst. Director
- 2001 Wiedźmin (The Hexer) - Casting Director
- 1999 Pan Tadeusz - with director Andrzej Wajda - Second Unit Director
- 1988 And the Violins Stopped Playing - with director Alexander Ramati - Production Organizer

Television:

- 2008 Teraz Albo Nigdy - series - Casting Director, Second Unit Director
- 2008 Czas Honoru - series - Casting Director, Second Unit Director
- 2007 Twarzą w Twarz - series - Casting Director, Second Unit Director
- 2005-2007 Magda M. - series - Casting Director
- 2002 Wiedźmin (The Hexer) - series - Casting Director
