= Grzegorz Ciechowski =

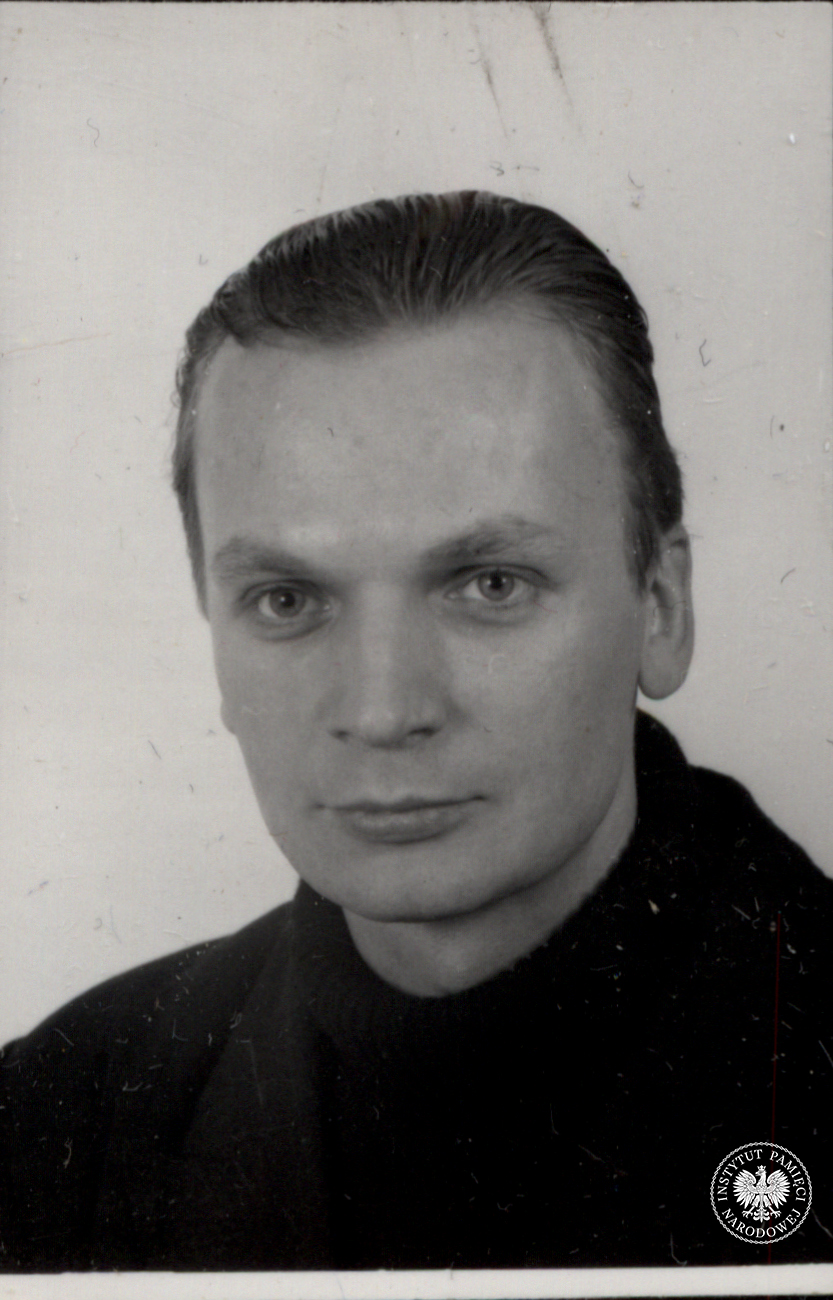
- Ciechowski's passport photo. From the IPN's archives
- Born: 29 August 1957; Tczew, Poland
- Died: 22 December 2001 (aged 44); Warsaw, Poland
- Education: Nicolaus Copernicus University in Toruń
- Occupations: Musician, singer, composer, poet
- Spouse(s): 1. Jolanta Muchlińska (divorced); 2. Anna Wędrowska (until his death)
- Partner: Małgorzata Potocka
- Children: 4 (3 daughters, 1 son)
- Musical career
- Also known as: Obywatel G.C., Ewa Omernik, Grzegorz z Ciechowa
- Genres: Rock, post punk, new wave, art rock
- Instruments: Keyboards, flute
- Years active: 1976-2001
- Label: Pomaton EMI
- Formerly of: Republika

Grzegorz Zbigniew Ciechowski (29 August 1957 – 22 December 2001) was a Polish rock musician and film music composer.

Ciechowski was born in Tczew. He was the founder and frontman of the band Republika, which was one of Poland's most popular rock groups. In the mid-1980s, Ciechowski took a break from the group and formed a new band called Obywatel GC (Citizen GC), again with considerable commercial success. At least a seven-song eponymous vinyl record, Obywatel G.C. exists, released by Tonpress KAW, copyright 1986. In 1991, Republika was revived, and Ciechowski was involved with a number of other ensembles. In 1996, as Grzegorz z Ciechowa, he recorded the album ojDADAna.

Ciechowski also composed for other artists such as Kasia Kowalska and Justyna Steczkowska and produced an album for German vocalist Mona Mur. He composed scores for the films Stan Strachu by Janusz Kijowski and The Hexer by Marek Brodzki; for the latter he received a Polish Film Award in 2001. Additionally, he wrote music for the German television show Schloß Pompon Rouge.

Ciechowski won ten Fryderyk Awards for his music, more than any other musician.

Ciechowski had four children. He died of a heart attack in Warsaw after undergoing emergency surgery for a heart aneurysm, at the age of 44. His ashes were buried at Powązki Military Cemetery on 4 January 2002.
