= Radzimiński =

Lis coat of arms used by some of Radzimiński family

The Radzimiński family (feminine: Radzimińska) was an old Polish noble family. Some lines of the family used Brodzic, Lis or Lubicz coat of arms. It is also a Polish surname.

== Notable people ==
- Andrzej Radzimiński (born 1958), Polish historian, professor and rector of the Nicolaus Copernicus University in Toruń
- Jerzy Frąckiewicz Radzimiński (1580–1629), Polish royal secretary, marshal of the Supreme Tribunal of the Grand Duchy of Lithuania, land judge of Lida
- Józef Radzimiński (died in 1820), Polish voivode of Gniezno, senator-castellan, senator-voivode of the Duchy of Warsaw
- Richard Radziminski (born 1951), Australian rules footballer
- Stanisław Radzimiński (died 1591), Polish voivode of Podlaskie, castellan of Czersk, Zakroczym, starost of Liw, Kamieniec
- Zygmunt Radzimiński (1843–1928), Polish archaeologist, historian, heraldist and genealogist
