= Obywatel GC =

Obywatel G.C.
- Origin: Poland
- Genres: Rock, art rock, new wave
- Years active: 1986–1992
- Past members: Grzegorz Ciechowski; Jan Borysewicz; Wojciech Karolak; Krzysztof Ścierański; José Torres

Obywatel G.C. was a Polish supergroup band created by Polish rock musician Grzegorz Ciechowski. The band was formed in 1986, after Ciechowski attempted to pursue a solo career after breaking up with another band called Republika. The group had different musicians from different genres, chosen by Ciechowski as the best jazz men and rockers in Poland. These people were Jan Borysewicz, one of the founders of Lady Pank, Wojciech Karolak, a notable jazz and blues musician, Krzysztof Ścierański, bass guitarist, and José Torres, a Cuban-Polish drummer. In total, they have had a total of 5 LPs and several singles. The band became notable in 1988 with the album Tak! Tak!, which had at the most 300,000 copies circulating and was awarded a gold disc. The band was disbanded in 1992, when Ciechowski reentered Republika.

== Discography ==
=== Studio albums ===
- 1986 – Obywatel G.C., Tonpress
- 1988 – Tak! Tak!, Polskie Nagrania Muza
- 1989 – Stan strachu (made for the Janusz Kijowski film Stan strachu, Polskie Nagrania Muza)
- 1992 – Obywatel świata (made for the film/play Obywatel świata, Arston)

=== Compilation albums ===
- 1993 – Selekcja, Sonic
- 2007 – Gwiazdy polskiej muzyki lat 80., TMM Polska / Planeta Marketing

=== EP ===
- 1989 – Citizen G.C. (EP), ZPR Records

=== Box ===
- 2004 – Kolekcja (box), EMI Music Poland – antologia zawierająca albumy Obywatela G.C.

=== Single ===
- 1986 – single "Spoza linii świata" / "Mówca", Tonpress
- 1986 – single "Paryż – Moskwa 17:15" / "Odmiana przez osoby", Tonpress

=== Music Charts ===
Year	Title	Item on the list
Year	Title	LP3
1986	Błagam, nie odmawiaj	5
1987	Paryż-Moskwa 17.15	1
1987	Kaspar Hauser	9
1987	Spoza linii świata	25
1988	Przyznaję się do winy	3
1988	Nie pytaj o Polskę	1
1988	Tak... tak... to ja!	1
1988	Podróż do ciepłych krajów	9
1989	Ja Kain, ty Abel	8
1991	Piosenka dla Weroniki	3
1992	Zasypiasz sama	26
1992	Umarła klasa	21
