= José Torres (percussionist) =

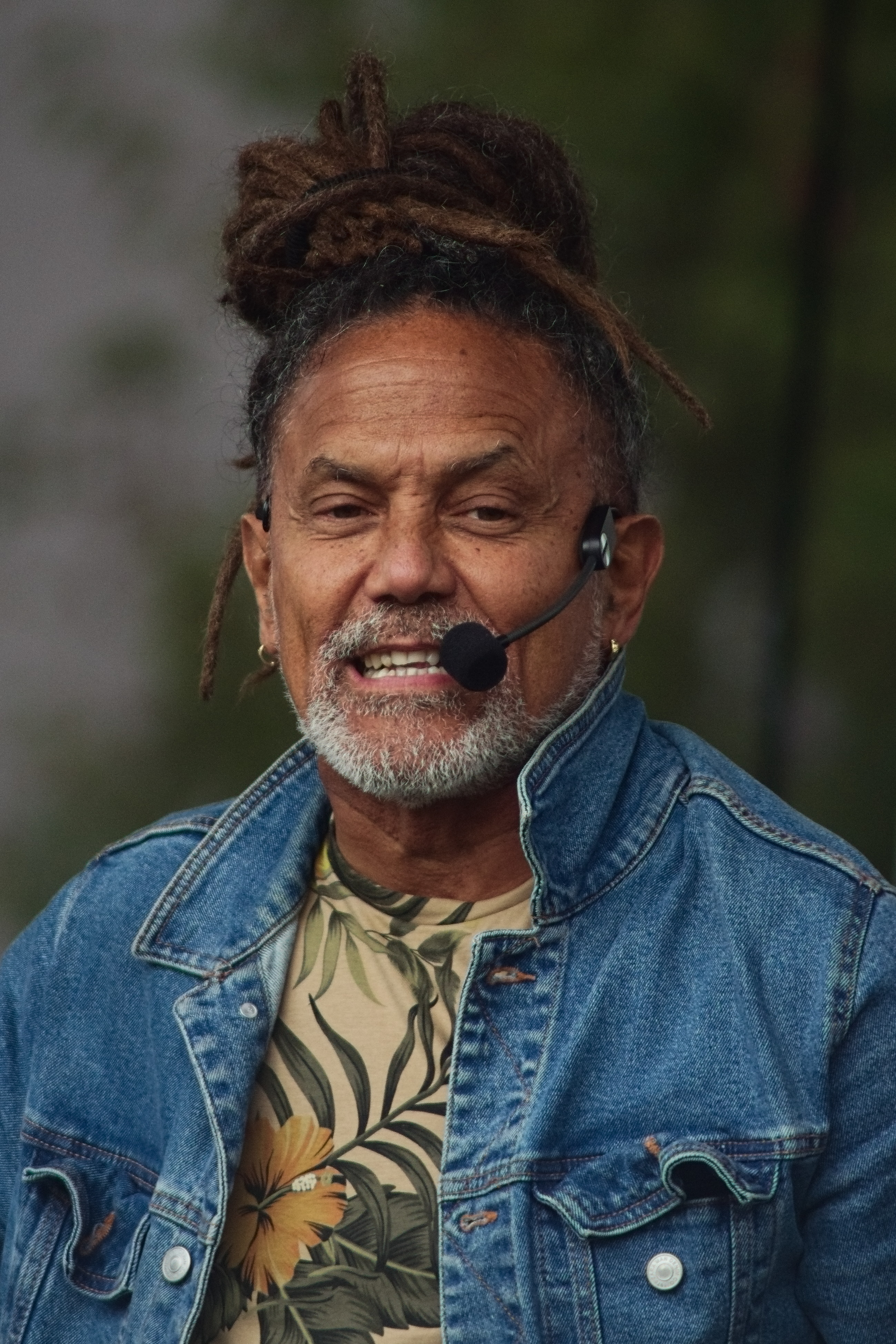
- José Torres in 2023

Background information
- Born: 19 September 1958 (age 67); Havana, Cuba
- Years active: 1982 – present
- Website: www.torres.com.pl

José Torres (born 19 September 1958, Havana, Cuba) is a Cuban-Polish musician and percussionist.

A graduate of the Karol Lipiński Academy of Music, Torres was a founder of the first Polish salsa orchestra under the name José Torres y Salsa Tropical. From the very beginning of his stay in Poland (except for a period of several years), he has lived in Wrocław. He has a wife Iza and sons Tomasz (drummer for Afromental) and Filip. He authored an autobiography: Salsa na wolności (ISBN 8373845941, Wydawnictwo Dolnośląskie, 2006).

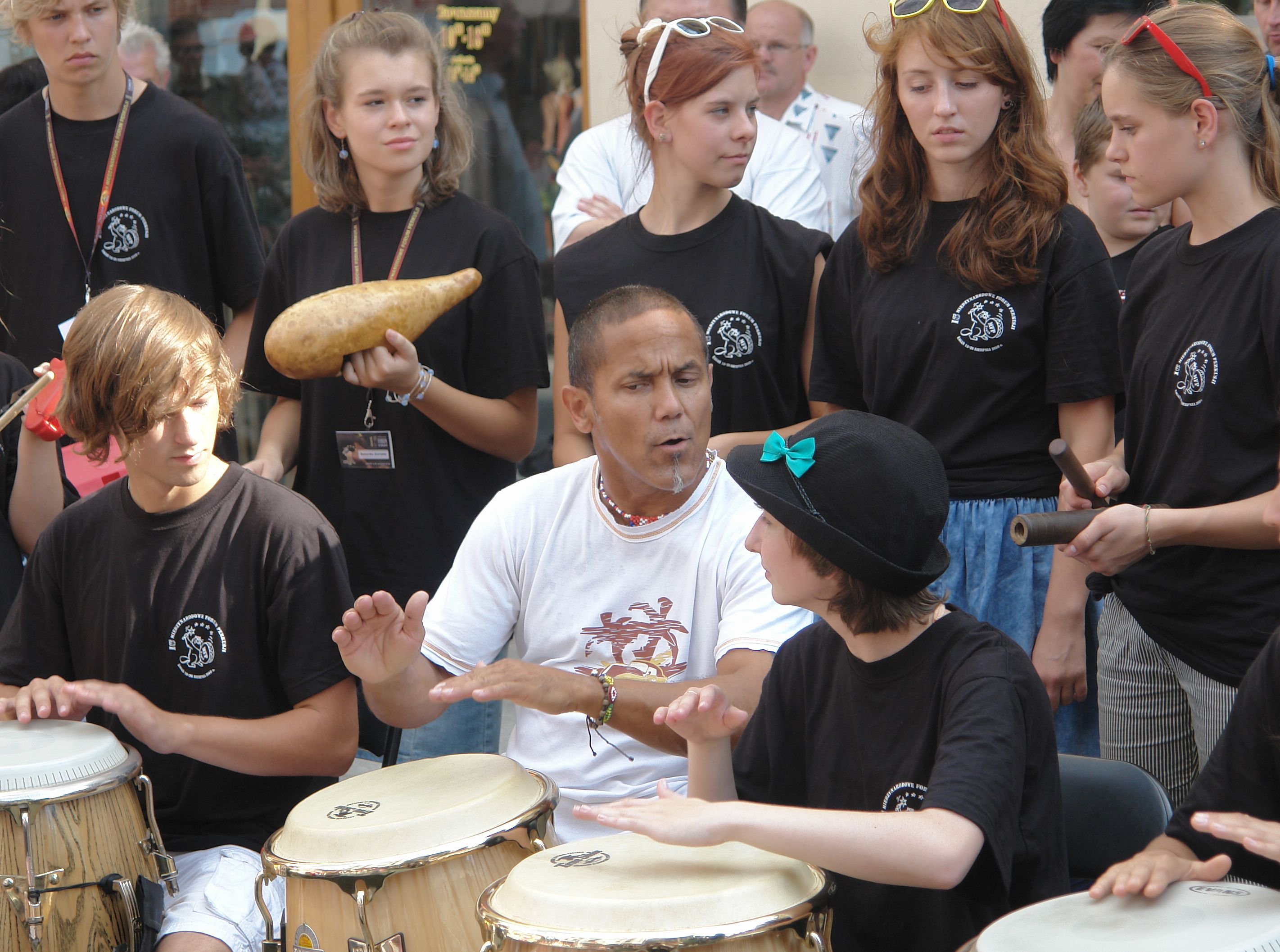
Performing with young musicians in Żagań, August 2010

== Discography ==
- 1982: John Porter – China Disco (PolJazz/Pronit)
- 1983: Tomasz Stańko – C.O.C.X. (PolJazz/Pronit)
- 1983: Sławomir Kulpowicz – Prasad in Mangalore/Three Etudes (PolJazz)
- 1983: Maanam – Nocny Patrol (Jako)
- 1983: Crash – Something Beautiful But Not Expensive (JA&RO)
- 1983: Zbigniew Lewandowski – Zbigniew Lewandowski (PolJazz)
- 1983: String Connection – New Romantic Expectation (PolJazz)
- 1985: Alex Band – Hit Of The World (Polskie Nagrania Muza)
- 1986: Lewandowski Torres – Partnership (PolJazz)
- 1986: Obywatel GC – Obywatel G.C. (Tonpress)
- 1986: Michał Bajor – Michał Bajor Live (Muza)
- 1987: Zbigniew Namysłowski – Open (Muza)
- (1987-1988) Zbigniew Lewandowski – Golden Lady (Muza)
- 1988: Extra Ball – Akumulla-Torres (PolJazz)
- 1988: Obywatel GC – Tak! Tak! (Muza)
- 1989: Walk Away – Walk Away (Muza)
- 1991: Kukla Band – Szczęśliwej drogi... (ZPR)
- 1992: Obywatel GC – Obywatel świata (MMPP)
- 1993: In Spector – We Are The Party (Agrofar)
- 1994: Maryla Rodowicz – Marysia biesiadna (Produktion)
- 1995: Nocna Zmiana Bluesa – Blues mieszka w Polsce (Hammer Music)
- 1995: Stanisław Soyka – Sonety Shakespeare (Pomaton EMI)
- 1995: Maseli Ścierański Torres – Music Painters (Govi Records)
- 1996: Graża T. – Świerszcze (Pomaton EMI)
- 1996: Amirian – Bardzo Niebieskie Migdały (Poligram)
- 1996: Marek Raduli – Meksykański symbol szczęścia (New Abra)
- 1996: Urszula – Akustycznie (Govi Records)
- (1996-1997) Ryszard Rynkowski – Jawa (Pomaton EMI 0724385615627)
- 1997: Music Painters – Inna bajka (Govi Records)
- 1997: Zbigniew Namysłowski – Dances (Polonia Records)
- 1997: Michał Lorenc – Blood & Wine (picture soundtrack)
- 1997: Michał Lorenc – Bandyta (picture soundtrack)
- 1997: Kayah – Kamień (Zic Zac)
- 1997: Majka Jeżowska – Kochaj czworonogi
- (1997-1998: Beata Bednarz – Co jest grane (YAKO)
- 1998: Kayah – Zebra (Zic Zac)
- 1998: Marek Kościkiewicz – Tylko błękit (BMG Poland)
- 1998: Stare Dobre Małżeństwo – Miejska strona Księżyca (New Abra)
- 1998: Budka Suflera – Budka Suflera Akustycznie (New Abra)
- 1998: Raz Dwa Trzy – Niecud (Pomaton EMI)
- 1998: Marek Kościkiewicz – Tylko błękit (Zic Zac)
- 1999: Kostek Joriadis – Przebudzenie (BMG)
- 1999: Mietek Jurecki – 12 sprawiedliwych (New Abra)
- 1999: Marcin Pospieszalski – Prawo ojca
- 2000: Maryla Rodowicz – Karnawał 2000
- 2000: Stonehenge – Echo Wyspy (RMF FM Kraków)
- 2000: Mietek Szcześniak – Spoza nas
- 2001: José Torres y Salsa Tropical – José Torres y Salsa Tropical (RMF FM Kraków)
- 2002: PH Connection (Budapeszt)
- 2006: Blue Café – Ovosho (EMI Music Poland)
- 2010: José Torres y Salsa Tropical – Torres Salsa Carnaval
- 2011: Afromental – The B.O.M.B. (EMI Music Poland)

== Filmography ==
- "Moja Kuba, moja Polska" (2007, film dokumentalny, reżyseria: Maria Zmarz-Koczanowicz)
