= Brodzic coat of arms =

Polish coat of arms

Brodzic
- Battle cry: Brodzic
- Alternative names: Broda, Brodzicz, Brodzik, Trzy Krzyże
- Earliest mention: 1414
- Towns: Stare Żochy, Gmina Ojrzeń
- Families: Baranowski, Bartoszewicz, Bilina, Blum, Bońkowski, Bonisławski, Boniuszko, Bońkowski, Borodzic, Borodzicz, Brodzic, Brodzicki, Brodzicz, Brodzik, Brodziński, Brodzki, Brzezieński, Brzeziński, Bunin, Ciołko, Dąbrówka, Dobrzycki, Dobszewicz, Dolanowski, Dubowski, Dybowski, Dybek, Dylewski, Frąckiewicz, Fronckiewicz, Gąsiorowski, Janczewski, Jeżewski, Kapleński, Kapliński, Kazanowicz, Kliczewski, Kluczewski, Koniecki, Kosianowicz, Krzynowłocki, Krzynowłoski, Kuczkrajowski, Kulwicki, Kulwiec, Kunecki, Kuniecki, Kurządkowski, Kurzątkowski, Kuszelewski, Lewandowski, Lipiński, Łącki, Łoski, Majewski, Milański, Milkint, Miłocki, Modelski, Mojecki, Mojek, Mrokowski, Noiszewski, Nojszewski, Noyszewski, Olszewski, Ostrzykowski, Padewski, Pilitowski, Pilityński, Piltowski, Piński, Podhorski, Pogorzelski, Pokutyński, Politowski, Poluchowski, Przetak, Przetakiewicz, Przewłocki, Radomiski, Radomski, Radzanowski, Radzimiński, Radzymiński, Regulski, Rzym, Rzymski, Siermoski, Sieromski, Sinciłło, Sinciło, Siromski, Siuciłło, Siwicki, Socha, Suroż, Suskrajowski, Suskrojowski, Szczutowski, Talibski, Talipski, Tyborowski, Wosiński, Wroczeński, Wroczyński, Zaborski, Zachajżewicz, Zacharkiewicz, Zawacki, Zawadzki, Zawałowski, Zochowski, Żochowski, Żublewski.

Brodzic is a Polish coat of arms. It was used by several szlachta families in the times of the Polish–Lithuanian Commonwealth.

== Blazon ==
The coat of arms is composed of three gold crosses, placed on a gold circle in the crotches. The crest with five ostrich feathers, all on a field of red.

== Notable bearers ==
Notable bearers of this coat of arms include:

- Stanisław Żochowski
- Kyprian Zochovskyj (Polish: Cyprian Żochowski)
- Vyacheslav Lypynsky (Polish: Wacław Lipiński)

== See also ==
- Polish heraldry
- Heraldic family
- List of Polish nobility coats of arms

== Bibliography ==
- Tadeusz Gajl: Herbarz polski od średniowiecza do XX wieku : ponad 4500 herbów szlacheckich 37 tysięcy nazwisk 55 tysięcy rodów. L&L, 2007. ISBN 978-83-60597-10-1.
- Elżbieta Sączys: Szlachta wylegitymowana w Królestwie Polskim w latach 1836-1861. DiG, 2007. ISBN 8371811454
