= Lis coat of arms =

Polish coat of arms

Lis
- Battle cry: Lis, Orzy Orzy, Strzępacz
- Alternative names: Bzura, Sikora, Strępaca, Lisy, Murza, Vulpis
- Earliest mention: 1306 (seal)
- Cities: Jędrzejów, Rydzyna
- Families: 265 names Abrek, Bachcicki, Bartłomiejewicz, Bechcicki, Bechczycki, Beglewski, Beglowski, Benet, Bianki, Biegłowski, Biskupski, Blazevicius, Bolesraszycki, Bolestraszycki, Borowski, Bucela, Bucell, Buchczycki, Bukcicki, Bukczycki, Bzura, Bzurski, Chomętowski (Chomutowski, Chomątowski), Chomiński, Chrapkowski, Chrzelowski, Cieszowski, Czarnecki, Czarnocki, Czarnowski, Czyż, Czyżogórski, Długokęcki, Doraszkiewicz, Doroszek, Doroszkiewicz, Doroszko, Doroszkowski, Drobisz, Elzbut, Filipowicz, Foland, Fulko, Fułko, Gatardowicz, Gawecki, Gawęcki, Gawianowski, Gertut, Giebułtowski, Gielbutowski, Gieniusz, Glikowski, Gliński, Gniewecki, Gniewięcki, Gołuchowski, Gomuński, Gordziejowicz, Gotardowicz, Gotartowski, Gottart, Goworski, Grajbner, Grodowski, Grudowski, Grzegorzewski, Grzywa, Holenczyński, Homentowski Pieczynoga, Hukowski, Irząd, Iwasieńcowicz, Iwaszeńcewicz, Iwaszeńcowicz, Jarnicki, Jerlicz, Jęczyński, Jodko, Jonczyński, Jurjewicz, Kanigłowski, Kanigowski, Kantur, Karnysz, Kasicki, Kęsztort, Kieysztor, Kirkiłło, Klimuntowski, Kniehenicki, Kolesiński, Komoński, Komuński, Konstantynowicz, Kontrym, Kończa, Kosman, Kosmowski, Kostrzewski, Kozakowski, Kozłowski, Koźniński, Kroiński, Kuszczycki, Kutyłowski, Kwetko, Kwileński, Kwiliński, Latecki, Letecki, Lipicki, Lis, Lisański, Lisiak, Lisiański, Lisicki, Lisiecki, Lisowiecki, Lisowski, Lissowski, Łącki, Macowicz, Majkut, Makarewicz, Makarowicz, Malużeński, Malużyński, Małuszeński, Małużeński, Marchel, Medeksza, Metra, Michajłowicz, Michałowicz, Michałowski, Michayłowicz, Michniewicz, Miechorzewski, Miechorzowski, Mieszkowski, Mikołajczewski, Mikołajewski, Mikołajski, Mikorski, Mikuczewski, Miroński, Mnichowski, Moneta, Mytko, Nacewicz, Nacowicz, Naczowicz, Narbut, Narkiewicz, Niecikowski, Nieczycki, Niestojkowicz, Nieszycki, Nietecki, Nieznanowski, Nowkuński, Ochab, Ochap, Olszewski, Ołtarzewski, Omeluta, Osendowski, Osędowski, Ossendowski, Paśmieski, Petraszkowicz, Petrowicz, Piaseczyński, Piasocki, Pieczenga, Pieczęga, Pieczonka, Pieczynga, Pietkiewicz, Pohowicz, Pohozy, Postrumieński, Princewicz, Proszczowicz, Przędziński, Radzimiński, Radzymiński, Rappold, Reynhard, Roszczyc, Roszczyna, Rosznicki, Rościsz, Roźnicki, Rożnicki, Rożniecki, Rudnicki, Ruszczeński, Ruszczyc, Ruszczyński, Ruszel, Ruściński, Rymwid, Samsonowicz, Sangayło, Sapieha, Saułukowicz, Sikora, Sikorski, Sipowicz, Słowik, Słupski, Sokora, Spirydynow, Spirydynowicz, Spiżarny, Stanisławowicz, Starzeński, Starzyński, Strażyński, Strzeblewski, Strzelbowski, Sudyk, Sumigajło, Sungayło, Szkudliski, Szweger, Śmieciński, Światopełk, Światopełkowicz, Świrski, Tałatowicz, Tausz, Tausza, Trzonoski, Tymiński, Uchorowski, Uliński, Wankowicz, Wańkowicz, Wańkowski, Wasiencowicz, Werbski, Wereszczaka, Wichorowski, Wiereszczaka, Wierzbski, Wieźliński, Wieżliński, Wilkanowski, Wojtechowicz, Wolan, Wolski, Wołotkowicz, Woronowicz, Worowski, Wroniewski, Wróblewski, Wysocki, Zabeło, Zabiełło, Zadambrowski, Zadąbrowski, Zając, Zaleski, Zawadzki, Zbiełło, Zbieło, Zdan, Żarno

Lis (Polish for "Fox") is a Polish coat of arms. It was used by many noble families of Clan Lis.

== Legend ==
In 1058 Duke Casimir I the Restorer while chasing the pagan Lithuanians and Yotvingians who devastated Polish lands, came to Sochaczew. He sent a knight of the Lis Clan (Fox Clan) to scout the region for enemies. When the knight came across a river he met a strong enemy unit. Unable to attack them alone, he decided immediately to shoot a lighted arrow into the air to call for reinforcements. Help arrived soon and defeated the enemies. A grateful Casimir granted the brave knight a new coat of arms with an arrow in the escutcheon and his former sign - the fox - was placed in the crest.

== Notable bearers ==
Notable bearers of this coat of arms have included:

- Krystyn z Kozichgłów
- Jaksa z Targowiska
- Mikołaj z Kozłowa
- Ferdynand Antoni Ossendowski
- Stanisław Chomętowski
- Sapieha Family
  - Adam Stefan Sapieha
  - Aleksander Michał Sapieha
  - Aleksander Paweł Sapieha
  - Jan Sapieha
  - Kazimierz Sapieha
  - Kazimierz Jan Paweł Sapieha
  - Lew Sapieha
  - Paweł Jan Sapieha
  - Kazimierz Nestor Sapieha
- Szymon Rudnicki, Bishop of Warmia
- Melchior Wańkowicz
- Henryk Samsonowicz
- Ferdynand Ruszczyc
- Alexander Prince Świrski
- Andrzej Prince Świrski-Jarnicki
- Mateusz Prince Cichocki-Lis-Jarnicki
- Marian Prince Lis-Jarnicki
- Roman Prince Świrski
- Eric Prince Świrski
- Yuri Lisyansky

== Gallery ==
Bianki (odm.)

Jerlicz (odm.)

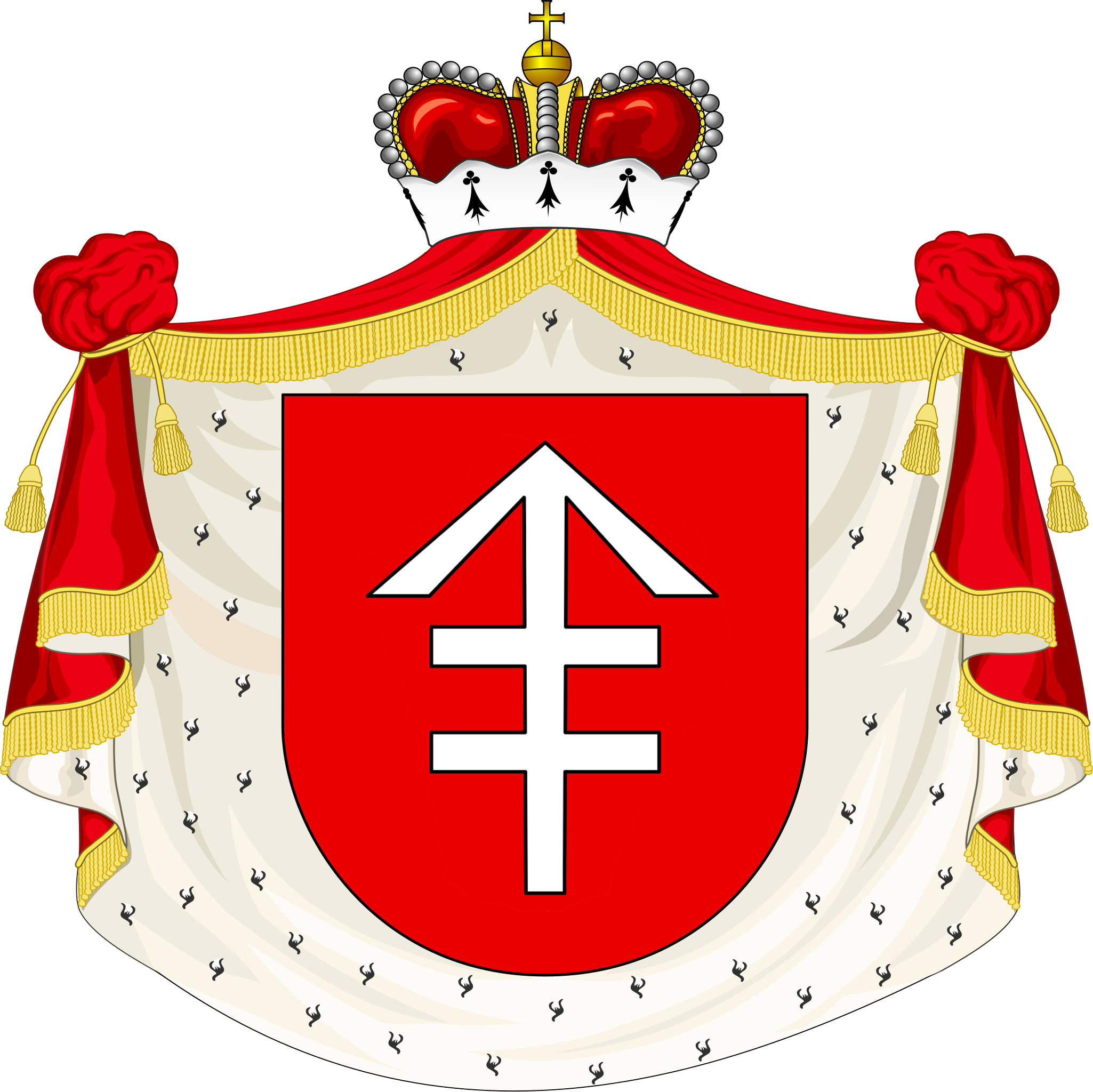
Coat of Arms of Princes Sapieha

Coat of Arms of Princes Sapieha (1858-1859)

== See also ==
- Polish heraldry
- Heraldic family
- List of Polish nobility coats of arms

== Bibliography ==
- Andrzej Kulikowski: Wielki herbarz rodów polskich. Warszawa: Świat Książki, 2005, s. 238-240. ISBN 83-7391-523-0.
- Jan Długosz: Jana Długosza kanonika krakowskiego Dziejów polskich ksiąg dwanaście, ks. IX. Kraków: 1867-1870, s. 264.
- Tadeusz Gajl: Herbarz polski od średniowiecza do XX wieku : ponad 4500 herbów szlacheckich 37 tysięcy nazwisk 55 tysięcy rodów. L&L, 2007. ISBN 978-83-60597-10-1.
