= Republika (band) =

Polish rock band

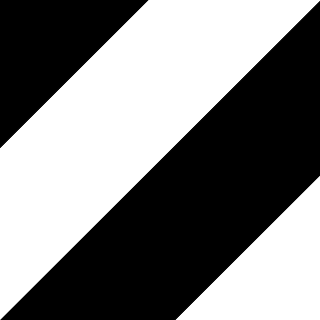

Background information
- Origin: Toruń, Poland
- Genres: Rock, new wave, post-punk, art rock, experimental rock, electronic rock, trip hop, folktronica
- Years active: 1981–1986; 1990–2002
- Labels: Sonic, Pomaton EMI, Polton, Arston, Sound-Pol, Polskie Radio Łódź, Złoty Melon
- Past members: Grzegorz Ciechowski (deceased); Sławomir Ciesielski; Zbigniew Krzywański; Paweł Kuczyński; Leszek Biolik; Jacek Rodziewicz; José Torres

Republika was a Polish rock band which began in 1978 in Toruń, Poland. Originally, the band was founded and fronted by Jann Castor under the name Res Publica. (See the links and notes below). The name took its origin from "Rzecz Pospolita" (Res Publica), but under the communist regime at the time the name was censored and not allowed. The band name was invented by Kris Caputa (Polish) currently residing in Victoria BC, Canada, who for the last thirty years worked in various fields of applied science, including astronomical instrumentation and numerical electrodynamics. One of the most notable member was the brother of Jann Castor, Zbigniew Ruciński, who was a guitar virtuoso - and it was him, who brought Grzegorz Ciechowski into the whole picture. The original art (black & white) was created by Ina Koneczna, an artist from Torun, which was later transformed (but based on her art) into black and white stripes that became the band's logo. Republika became one of the most original European bands thanks to their specific anti-mainstream rock & roll songs and black-and-white performance motif. Their new wave-inspired music and lyrics, both catchy and poetic, forged a path into the Polish rock pantheon. Republika debuted at a new wave band concert in Torun in November 1981.

In June 1982 the band, consisting of Paweł Kuczyński (bass), Zbigniew Krzywański (guitar), Sławomir Ciesielski (drums), and Grzegorz Ciechowski (vocal, piano, flute) began a three-month recording session, which resulted in the classic 1983 album Nowe sytuacje (eng. New Situations). Within a year, Republika recorded Nieustanne tango (eng. Permanent Tango), which was a logical expansion of the anti-regime musical ideas they'd established in their debut. The band also released an English-language album, the Orwellian bell-ringer entitled 1984. Due to artistic quarrels, Republika disbanded in the summer of 1986. Grzegorz Ciechowski kicked off a solo career under as Obywatel G.C. (Citizen G.C); Kuczyński, Krzywański and Ciesielski, along with vocalist Robert Gawliński founded the band, Opera. Using unreleased Republika song sketches, Ciechowski released a solo album, Obywatel G.C., in 1986. His debut was an artistic success rather than a commercial one; however his 1988 sophomore effort, Tak! Tak! was a blockbuster. In 1990, a concert in Opole acted as a catalyst for Republika's reunion. Only Kuczyński refused the proposition, so as a trio, the band issued their comeback album, 1991, which was a compilation of their well-known but rearranged songs. Kuczyński was replaced by Leszek Biolik, with whom Ciechowski, Krzywański, and Ciesielski finished recording the final Obywatel G.C. album titled Obywatel Świata (Citizen of the World) .

In 1993, the first live unplugged album Bez Prądu (Unplugged, lit. Without current) was released. The same year Republika recorded the classic album Siódma Pieczęć (eng. The Seventh Seal), which presented a more acoustic countenance, with keyboards and samplers replaced by Hammond or Rhodes piano. In 1995, they released the rather pop-sounding album, Republika marzeń (eng. Republic of Dreams). The last studio album recorded by the band was Masakra (eng. Massacre), inspired by modern heavy rock and trip-hop. Grzegorz Ciechowski's sudden cardiac death on December 22, 2001 interrupted the production of the next Republika album. Four finished tracks along with 15 live songs comprised a double-CD simply titled Republika.

== Discography ==
=== Studio albums ===
Title	Album details
Nowe sytuacje	Released: July 4, 1983; Label: Polton; Formats: CD, CS, digital download
1984 (Note: English-language version of Nowe Sytuacje)	Released: January 30, 1984; Label: Mega Organisation; Formats: CD, CS, digital download
Nieustanne tango	Released: September 17, 1984; Label: Polton; Formats: CD, CS, digital download
1991	Released: August 19, 1991; Label: Arston; Formats: CD, CS
Siódma pieczęć	Released: August 16, 1993; Label: Sound-Pol; Formats: CD, CS, digital download
Republika marzeń	Released: September 11, 1995; Label: Pomaton EMI; Formats: CD, CS, digital download
Masakra	Released: December 14, 1998; Label: Pomaton EMI; Formats: CD, CS, digital download
Ostatnia płyta	Released: March 23, 2002; Label: Pomaton EMI; Formats: CD, CS

=== Live albums ===
Title	Album details	Peak chart positions
Title	Album details	POL
Bez prądu	Released: 1993; Label: Polskie Radio Łódź; Formats: CD	—
Republika	Released: March 23, 2002; Label: Pomaton EMI; Formats: CD, digital download	5
Największe przeboje - LIVE	Released: 2004; Label: Axel Springer Kontakt; Formats: CD	—
Trójka Live! aka Koncerty w Trójce vol. 13 - Republika	Released: November 7, 2007; Label: 3 SKY MEDIA; Formats: CD, digital download	38
"—" denotes a recording that did not chart or was not released in that territory.

=== Compilation albums ===
Title	Album details	Peak chart positions	Sales	Certifications
Title	Album details	POL	Sales	Certifications
'82-'85	Released: March 15, 1993; Label: Sonic; Formats: CD	48		
Biała flaga	Released: March 12, 1999; Label: Pomaton EMI; Formats: CD	34	POL: 50,000+	POL: Gold
Komplet	Released: November 15, 2003; Label: Pomaton EMI; Formats: CD	—		
Gwiazdy polskiej muzyki lat 80.	Released: June 26, 2007; Label: TMM Polska, Planeta Marketing; Formats: CD	—		
"—" denotes a recording that did not chart or was not released in that territory.

=== Video albums ===
Title	Video details	Sales	Certifications
Republika - Złote DVD	Released: November 23, 2002; Label: Pomaton EMI; Formats: DVD	POL: 5,000+	POL: Gold
Projekt Republika - Przystanek Woodstock 2011	Released: December 6, 2011; Label: Złoty Melon; Formats: DVD		

== In popular culture ==
- The song Psy Pawłowa was used during the closing credits for the 2016 video game SUPERHOT.
