= Brodziak =

Surname list

Brodziak is a surname. Notable people with the surname include:

- Kenn Brodziak (1913–1999), Australian entrepreneur, promoter, producer, and artist manager
- Kyle Brodziak (born 1984), Canadian ice hockey player
