= G. W. Stephen Brodsky =

Canadian academic and author (born 1933)

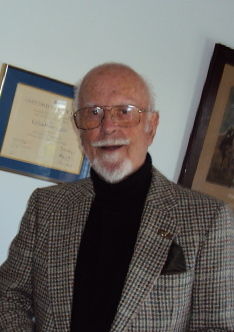
- Born: Gabriel Wilfrid Stephen Brodsky; 19 November 1933 (age 92); Brantford, Ontario, Canada
- Citizenship: Canadian, British
- Education: University of Victoria (M.A); University of York (D.Phil. (Ph.D.), D.Litt.)
- Occupations: Army, (retired), research scholar, author

Gabriel Wilfrid Stephen Brodsky (born 19 November 1933) is a Canadian research scholar and author in Literature of War and in Joseph Conrad studies.

== Life ==
G. W. Stephen Brodsky is a literary research scholar and author. Formerly a career soldier, he joined the Canadian Army Reserves in 1949, aged fifteen, as a boy drummer. He subsequently served 1951–83 in regular army paratroop and conventional units of the Canadian Infantry, retiring in the rank of major. He saw tours of duty with NATO in West Germany, as a UN Peacekeeper in Cyprus and Kashmir, and as an instructor of officers.

Brodsky holds a BA (Queen's University, Canada), MA (University of Victoria, Canada) in Renaissance Literature and Drama,, DPhil (PhD) and DLitt (University of York, UK) in Modern Literature with specialist studies in the works of Joseph Conrad. As a military professor on the academic faculty of Royal Roads Military College (RRMC), Victoria, Canada, he taught military ethics and Literature, and subsequently was a civilian Special Lecturer on Literature of War at RRMC.

A former trustee of the Joseph Conrad Society of America (2012–14), Brodsky writes and publishes literary criticism and reviews.

== Bibliography ==
- G. W. Stephen Brodsky, Joseph Conrad and Honor, Abingdon, Routledge, 2026. ISBN 978-1-041-35758-2.
- G. W. Stephen Brodsky, Gentlemen of the Blade: A Social and Literary History of the British Army Since 1660, Westport, Connecticut, Greenwood / Praeger, 1988. ISBN 9780313260674.
- William J. Patterson, A Regiment Worthy of Its Hire: The Canadian Guards 1953-1970. ed. G. W. Stephen Brodsky, The Canadian Guards Association,1991, ff. ISBN 0-9682355-0-6
- G. W. Stephen Brodsky, (1) "Conrad's Darkness Visible": Occidental Orientalism and the Exotic in the Malay Tales".(2) Elmar Schenkel, "Fusspuren", G. W. Stephen Brodsky, Trans. and Commentary, in Zwischen Ost und West: Joseph Conrad im Europaischen Gesprache, ed. Elmar Schenkel, Hans-Christian Trepte, Schriftenreihe der Societas Jablonoviana, vol. 2, Leipzig UP, 209-239, 2019.ISBN 978-3-86583-471-3.
- G. W. Stephen Brodsky, God's Dodger: The Story of a Front Line Chaplain, Sydney, Canada, Elysium, 1993, ISBN 0-9697009-0-3.
- G. W. Stephen Brodsky, Joseph Conrad's Polish Soul: Realms of Memory and Self, edited by George Z. Gasyna (Conrad: Eastern and Western Perspectives Series, vol. 25), Lublin, Maria Curie Skłodowska University Press / New York, Columbia University Press, 2016, 409 pp., ISBN 9788377847862.
- John R. Bishop with G. W. Stephen Brodsky (co-author, introd., ed.), The King's Bishop: A Canadian Corporal in Korea, 1950–51, Duncan, BC:Mossy Knoll, 2000. ISBN 0-9687825-0-7.
- G. W. Stephen Brodsky, ″Intimations of Joseph Conrad: A Century of Sightings and Citings of Conrad's Presences in Print, Crafts, Media and Monuments″. Ed. Mark Larabee. London/New York: Palgrave Macmillan, 2024. 232 pp. HC:ISBN 3031679172; E-Book:ISBN 978-3031679179
