= Adam Brodsky =

American singer

Adam Brodsky is an American, locally popular anti-folk singer, from Philadelphia, Pennsylvania, United States. In 2003, he attained the Guinness World Record for the Fastest Tour by Solo Performer with 50 shows in 50 states in 50 days.

== Background ==
Brodsky frequently refers to himself as "the Dork", or "Dorkboy". To highlight this, he has a tattoo, similar to Robert Indiana's sculpture, portrayed in Philadelphia's LOVE Park, proclaiming him a DORK. His songs typically feature self-deprecation, religion (especially Judaism), suicide, and rejection. His albums often include banter made between sets during performances.

His self-owned label is Permanent Records, which he started in the mid-1990s. Among the artists who have recorded under it are Todd Young, Butch Ross, EDO, Greg Simon, Pete Chambers and Steph Hayes.

In 2000, he was named the Best Folk Performer in the Philadelphia City Paper Music Awards. That year, he also developed a side project called, "A Brief History of Folk Music." Contrary to his raucous shows, it was primarily aimed at children.

Between August 3, 2003, and September 21, 2003, Brodsky set the Guinness World Record for the Fastest Tour by Solo Performer with 50 shows in 50 states in 50 days, and then performed in Washington DC the following night.

Brodsky allows audience members to record his live performances. In 2003, Mary Krause of Permanent Records gave permission for fan-made recordings of Brodsky's shows to be hosted on the Internet Archive.

Adam removed himself a self-imposed "hibernation" and went back on the road in April 2008 with shows in Hoboken, NJ; Boston, MA; Schenectady, NY and Ithaca, NY, with Steph Hayes from Steph Hayes and The Good Problems.

== Discography ==
- Deeply Flawed
- Dork Radio EP
- Dork (1997)
- Folk Remedy (2000)
- Hookers, Hicks, and Heebs (2003)
- Under the Covers (promotional)
- "No More Luxuries", hidden track on the Jim Carroll Band Tribute, Put Your Tongue to the Rail (1999)
