= Brodský =

Brodský (feminine: Brodská) is a Czech surname, derived from the word brod (meaning 'ford'). It originated as a name for a person who lives near a ford or near a place called Brod. Notable people with the surname include:

- Tereza Brodská (born 1968), Czech actress
- Vlastimil Brodský (1920–2002), Czech actor

== See also ==
- Brodsky
