= Szymon Rudnicki =

Polish historian (born 1938)

Szymon Rudnicki (born 8 February 1938 in Wilno) is a Polish historian. He specializes in the history of the Second Polish Republic, right-wing political movements of that era, and Polish-Jewish relations.

He lectured at the Institute of History of the University of Warsaw, from 1973 to 1987, he was its deputy director. In November 1996 he received a degree of professor. Rudnicki focuses mostly on the ideology and activities of Polish interwar right-wing movements. He also focuses on the Jewish question in Poland and Polish-Jewish relations in interwar Poland. His book Żydzi w parlamencie II Rzeczypospolitej (Jews in the Parliament of the Second Republic), published in 2003, won the KLIO Prize (Nagroda KLIO) in 2004 for the best scientific monography. Rudnicki is also a member of the Jewish Historical Institute (Żydowski Instytut Historyczny), where he co-edited their bulletin as the Kwartalnik Historii Żydów (Jewish History Quarterly).

In 2008 he was awarded the Jan Karski and Pola Nireńska Award by the YIVO Institute for Jewish Research for his achievements in the areas of contemporary Polish political history and the history of Polish Jews.

== Works ==
- Narodowa Demokracja w Warszawie, 1918–1939 (National Democracy in Warsaw, 1918–1939) (1972)
- Działalność polityczna konserwatystów polskich, 1918–1926 (Political Activity of Polish Conservatists, 1918–1926) (1981)
- Obóz Narodowo-Radykalny. Geneza i działalność (National Radical Camp. Genesis and Activity) (1985)
- Ziemiaństwo polskie w XX wieku (Polish Gentry in the 20th century) (1996)
- Roman Rybarski - o narodzie, ustroju i gospodarce (Roman Rybarski on Nation, System and Economy) (1997)
- Żydzi w parlamencie II Rzeczypospolitej (Jews in the Parliament of the Second Republic) (2003)
- Równi, ale niezupełnie (Equal, but not Completely) (2008)
