= Yulia Brodskaya =

Russian graphic designer

Yulia Brodskaya (Russian: Юлия Бродская, romanized: Yuliya Brodskaya, born in 1983, Moscow) is an artist and illustrator known for her elegant handmade and detailed paper illustrations.

== Biography ==
In 2004 Brodskaya moved from Moscow to UK where she continued her education in art, at the University of Hertfordshire. She was graduated with a master of art in graphics communication degree in 2006. Brodskaya started working as a freelance graphic designer, but she very quickly switched to the illustration field and became known for her innovative method of working with edge-glued strips of paper. However, the graphic design background has an influence on her artwork as most of the initial pieces have a strong typographic focus: “Typography is my second love, after paper and I’m really happy that I’ve found a way of combining the two. Having said that, I don’t want to exclude non-typobased designs, I’d like to work on different projects.”.

Much of Brodskaya’s work uses an old technique called Quilling, in which ribbons of paper are used to create intricate designs. She has swiftly earned an international reputation for her innovative paper illustrations and was named the ‘breakthrough star’ of the 2009 by Creative Review. Paper quilling has seen a resurgence over the last few years, and it’s arguably thanks to the handiwork of Brodskaya Brodskaya. When describing her paper art works Brodskaya says she is drawing with paper instead of on it.

Her work for g2 (The Guardian) was included in D&AD Annual for 2009. She also designed one of the Google Chrome themes.

In 2015 Brodskaya designed an official poster for The Wimbledon Championships. The following year, she created a large paper artwork for the Wimbledon Clubhouse.

She created a Forever® stamp design for United States Postal Service for release during 2016. She also created a set of Christmas 2017 stamps for New Zealand Post.

She was featured among other leading UK-based artists in the BBC programme Making Art Work: First Idea to Final Piece.
