= Bart Bonikowski =

American sociologist

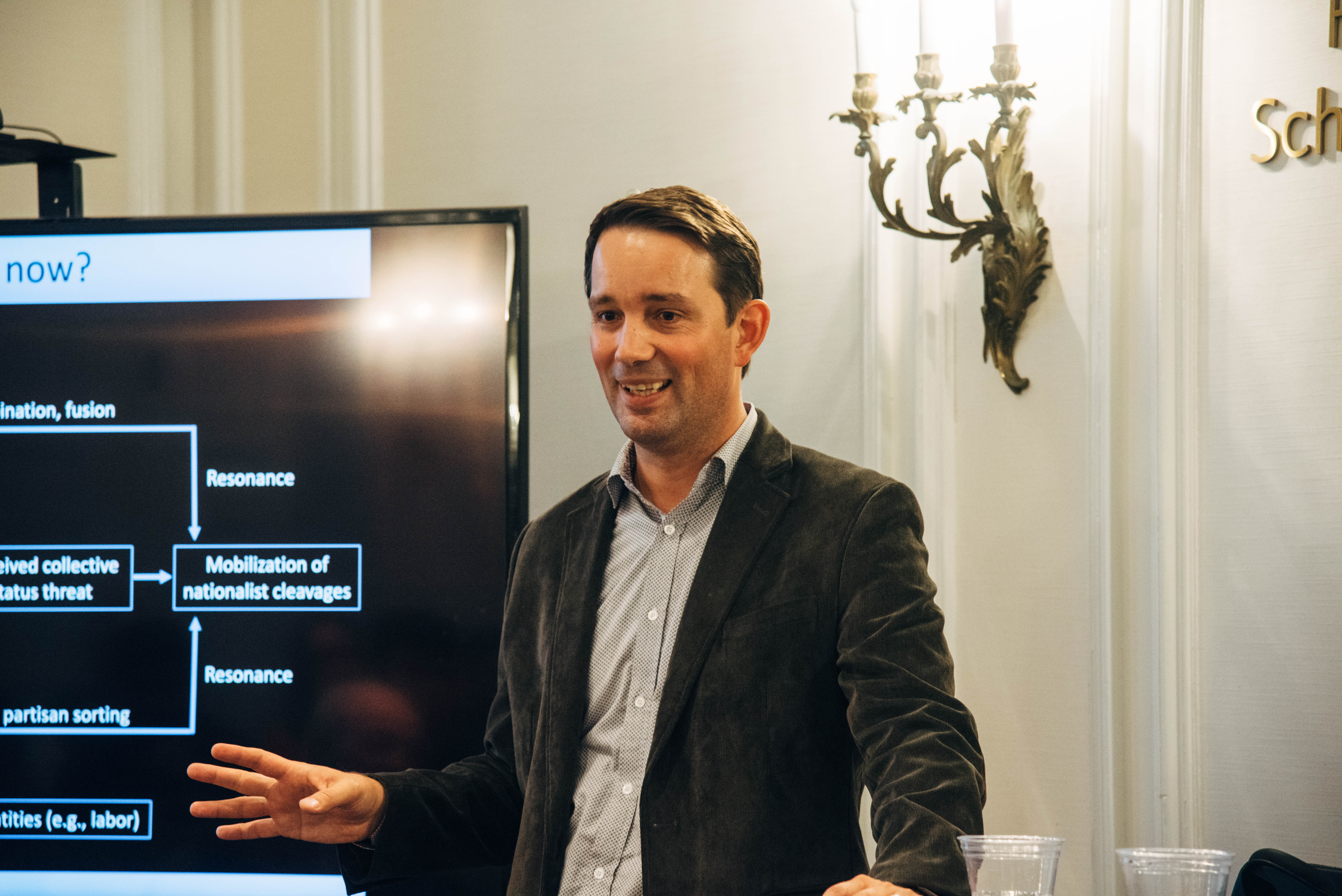
- Bonikowski in October 2019

Academic background
- Education: B.A., Sociology, 2003, Queen's University; M.A., Sociology, 2005, Duke University; M.A., Sociology, 2008, PhD., Sociology, 2011, Princeton University
- Thesis: Toward a theory of popular nationalism: shared representations of the nation-state in modern democracies (2011)

Bart Bonikowski is an American sociologist. Prior to joining the faculty at New York University (NYU), Bonikowski was an associate professor of sociology at Harvard University.

== Early life and education ==
Bonikowski earned his Bachelor of Arts degree in sociology from Queen's University and his first Master's degree from Duke University in 2005. While at Queens, he served as Vice President of Operations for the Alma Mater Society. Following Duke, he enrolled in Princeton University for his second Master's and PhD. His thesis, published in 2011, was titled Toward a Theory of Popular Nationalism: Shared Representations of the Nation-State in Modern Democracies.

== Career ==
Upon earning his PhD, Bonikowski joined the Department of Sociology at Harvard University as a faculty member. He also served as faculty associate at the Weatherhead Center for International Affairs and later as resident faculty at the Minda de Gunzburg Center for European Studies. In 2016, Bonikowski and sociologist Paul DiMaggio published a paper in the American Sociological Review titled "Varieties of American Popular Nationalism." Their research found supporting evidence that there were at least four kinds of American nationalists; (1) the disengaged, (2) creedal or civic nationalists, (3) ardent nationalists, and (4) restrictive nationalists.

In 2020, Bonikowski announced he was leaving Harvard to accept an associate professor position at New York University (NYU).
