= The Hexer (film) =

2001 film by Marek Brodzki

- Theatrical release poster
- Polish: Wiedźmin
- Directed by: Marek Brodzki
- Screenplay by: Michał Szczerbic
- Based on: The Witcher by Andrzej Sapkowski
- Produced by: Paweł Poppe; Lew Rywin
- Starring: Michał Żebrowski; Zbigniew Zamachowski; Maciej Kozłowski
- Cinematography: Bogdan Stachurski
- Edited by: Wanda Zeman
- Music by: Grzegorz Ciechowski
- Production company: Heritage Films
- Distributed by: Vision Film Distribution
- Release date: 9 November 2001
- Running time: 129 minutes
- Country: Poland
- Language: Polish
- Budget: zł 18,820,000 (US$4.6 million)

The Hexer (Note: The 2001 film and its accompanying series are rendered in English as Hexer.) or The Witcher (Note: Subsequently, the franchise changed its English name from Hexer to Witcher. For a discussion of Hexer versus Witcher as the English translation of the Polish term Wiedźmin, see here.) (Polish: Wiedźmin) is a 2001 Polish fantasy film directed by Marek Brodzki and written by Michał Szczerbic. It stars Michał Żebrowski as Geralt of Rivia. The story is based on the books and stories of The Witcher written by Polish author Andrzej Sapkowski.

The 13-episode television series came out the following year. The film has been described as essentially the then-unreleased television series condensed into a two-hour film, and received very poor reviews from both fans and critics. The film was the first attempt to adapt The Witcher universe to cinema.

== Premise ==
The television series and the film were loosely based on Andrzej Sapkowski's The Witcher (Wiedźmin) book series.

== Cast ==
- Michał Żebrowski as Geralt of Rivia
- Zbigniew Zamachowski as Dandelion
- Maciej Kozłowski as Falwick
- Tomasz Sapryk as Dermot Marranga
- Kinga Ilgner as Renfri
- Grażyna Wolszczak as Yennefer
- Ewa Wiśniewska as Calanthe
- Andrzej Chyra as Borch Three Jackdaws
- Anna Dymna as Nenneke
- Agata Buzek as Pavetta
- Jarosław Boberek as Yarpen Zigrin
- Dorota Kamińska as Eithne
- Wojciech Duryasz as Old Witcher
- Józef Para as Druid of Kaer Morhen
- Daniel Olbrychski as Filavandrel

== Production ==
The film had a budget of 19 million Polish zlotys, which was very high for contemporary Polish movies. Similarly, the film's marketing campaign had several times the budget of other Polish films of that time, in an attempt to imitate Hollywood's super-production. The film was aimed not just at science fiction and fantasy fans, but also at a general audience. To that end, its cast included many stars of Polish cinema, the music was composed by a well-known Polish composer, and the film was tied to a number of other promotional campaigns and related products inspired by the Witcher universe, such as toys and games, as well as the first official English translation of The Witcher.

The Hexer was the first film directed by Marek Brodzki. The final release was described as the third version of the film, rearranged and shortened. Some fans initially objected to the casting of several major roles. Their protests, reported in the press, led to a meeting between the producers and the cast and fans, which eventually appeased most of the protesters. Citing two major departures from his original script, screenwriter Michał Szczerbic demanded that his name not appear in the closing credits.

== Reception ==
The film received generally negative reviews after its release and since, with reviewers being generally positive in regard to actors and music, but critical of the plot and special effects.

Marcin Kamiński of Filmweb concluded that "it is not a good movie", noting that the plot was chaotic, mixing various adventures and scenes from the book series in a mostly random manner. Kamiński speculated that the film was intended as a glorified trailer for the subsequent television series. The montage of the scenes was considered so bad that it was said to evoke laughter in the audience, and the special effects were described as low-quality and obsolete. Kamiński did note that the film's saving grace was its actors, praising Michał Żebrowski, Zbigniew Zamachowski, Grażyna Wolszczak, and others.

Piotr Stasiak of gry-online praised the actors, scenography, costumes, and music, but criticized the fragmentary, incoherent plot, which was apparently due to the producers being unable to agree on the main plot and structure, and trying to summarize all of the key plot elements of the planned TV series episodes into one 2-hour movie.

Bartosz Kotarba of esensja criticized the plot, which "tries to tell too much and ends up telling too little", and the special effects, noting that the plastic dragon used for special effects was so lackluster that it resulted in salvos of laughter in the film audience. The reviewer was also critical of the unnecessary nudity and poor dialogue, though praised the actors for their efforts, as well as the music.

Sapkowski himself in several interviews laconically expressed his negative opinion about the film: "I can answer only with a single word, an obscene, albeit a short one". "I am a Polish Catholic, it is Lent now; I cannot utter swear words".

In a 2016 review, Barnaba Siegel of Gazeta.pl referred to the film as "the film we all want to forget". Siegel noted that while some actors were good, others acted as if in a story directed at children. Siegel also criticized some casting decisions, which portrayed then-popular comedy actors in serious roles, making it more difficult for audiences to treat the production as aimed at adults. Siegel was also critical of the plot, special effects, and costuming. He attributed the failures of the production to an inexperienced production crew, in particular director Marek Brodzki.

In a 2018 Gazeta Wyborcza retrospective, Maciej Grzenkowicz noted that the film has been "crushed by the reviewers and laughed out by fans".

Filmweb provides a score of 3.9/10.

The film has been subject to several analyses in academic research. In his 2015 article on The Hexer film and series, Robert Dudziński noted that both became in Poland "widely recognized examples of the weak level of Polish cinema's entertainment releases and a common butt of jokes of Polish science fiction and fantasy fans".

=== Awards ===
Despite its poor critical reception, the film received several award nominations in Poland related to its music score by Grzegorz Ciechowski. Ciechowski's music for The Hexer won the 2002 Polish Film Awards for the Best Film Music in 2001, as well as the Fryderyk award for the Best 2001 Original Soundtrack.

== See also ==
- Wiedźmin (album) – the film's soundtrack
- The Witcher – the fantasy series
- List of characters in The Witcher series
