= Marek Brodzki =

Polish film director and television director

- Born: 25 December 1960 (age 65)
- Occupations: Film and Television Director

Marek Brodzki (born 25 December 1960) is a Polish film director and television director. He directed the film and series versions of Wiedźmin aka The Hexer and the series Miasteczko. He has worked as First Assistant Director with top Polish directors Andrzej Wajda and Krzysztof Zanussi and has specialized as a Polish First Assistant Director and Second Unit Director on international productions made in Poland notably including Steven Spielberg's Schindler's List and has a long working relationship with German director Volker Schlöndorff. October 2015 he was awarded the Bronze Medal for Merit to Culture – Gloria Artis.

== Personal life ==
He is married to Production Manager, Casting Director, First Assistant Director Ewa Brodzka.

== Selected filmography ==
Feature films:

- 2010 Beyond the Steppes – with director Vanja d'Alcantara – Line Producer: Poland/Kazakhstan
- 2008 A Woman in Berlin (Anonyma – Eine Frau in Berlin) – with director Max Färberböck – Asst. Director: Poland
- 2006 Ulzhan – with director Volker Schlöndorff – First Asst. Director, Line Producer
- 2006 Strike (Strajk) – with director Volker Schlöndorff – First Asst. Director
- 2003 The Revenge (Zemsta) – with director Andrzej Wajda – First Asst. Director
- 2002 The Pianist – with director Roman Polanski – Crowd Marshall
- 1999 Pan Tadeusz – with director Andrzej Wajda – First Asst. Director
- 1999 Jakob the Liar – with director Peter Kassovitz – First Asst. Director: Poland
- 1999 Rider of the Flames (Feuerreiter) – with director Nina Grosse – Second Unit Director
- 1998 Ibangin – with director Moon Seung-wook – Second Unit Director, First Asst. Director
- 1997 Our God's Brother – with director Krzysztof Zanussi – First Asst. Director
- 1997 Un Air Si Pur – with director Yves Angelo – First Asst. Director
- 1996 L'Elève – with director Olivier Schatzky – First Asst. Director
- 1996 The Ogre (Der Unhold) – with director Volker Schlöndorff – First Asst. Director: Poland
- 1995 Les Milles – with director Sébastien Grall – First Asst. Director: Poland
- 1994 Le Colonel Chabert – with director Yves Angelo – First Asst. Director: Battle Scenes
- 1994 El Detective y la Muerte – with director Gonzalo Suárez – First Asst. Director: Poland
- 1993 Schindler's List – with director Steven Spielberg – Polish First Asst. Director
- 1993 La Petite Apocalypse – with director Costa-Gavras – Asst. Director
- 1992 The Silent Touch – with director Krzysztof Zanussi – Asst. Director
- 1991 Beltenebros – with director Pilar Miró – First Asst. Director: Poland
- 1991 Life for Life (Zycie Za Zycie) – with director Krzysztof Zanussi – First Asst. Director
- 1991 Eminent Domain – with director John Irvin – Asst. Director
- 1988 Wherever You Are... (Gdzieśkolwiek jest, jeśliś jest...) – with director Krzysztof Zanussi – Asst. Director

Television films:

- 2008 Stauffenberg – the True Story – German ZDF TV film
- 2007 Das Wunder von Mogadischu (Miracle of Mogadishu) – German ZDF TV film
- 2006 Die Hölle von Verdun – German ZDF TV film
- 2005 Das Drama von Dresden (the Drama of Dresden) – with director Sebastian Dehnhardt – Emmy Award for best documentary
- 2005 Wir Weltmeister – German ZDF TV film

Television series:

- 2004 Hitler's Managers – Germany
- 2002 Wiedźmin (The Hexer) – Poland
- 2000–01 Miasteczko – Poland

Internet TV series:

- 2009 Zobaczyć ciszę – Poland
  It was the first in Europe TV serial in sign language about a deaf family.
