= Narrenturm =

Narrenturm ('Tower of Fools') may refer to:

- The Tower of Fools, Polish original title Narrenturm, a 2002 historical fantasy novel by Andrzej Sapkowski
- Narrenturm (asylum), in Vienna, Austria
