= Maladie =

Maladie may refer to:

- Maladie, a character from the 2021 American science fiction drama TV series The Nevers
- Maladie (Sapkowski), a 1996 novelette by Andrzej Sapkowski

== See also ==
- Malady
