= Warriors of God =

2004 novel by Andrzej Sapkowski

- Author: Andrzej Sapkowski
- Original title: Boży bojownicy
- Translator: David French
- Language: Polish
- Series: Hussite Trilogy
- Genre: Historical fantasy
- Published: 2004 (superNOWA) (Polish); 2021 (Orbit) (English)
- Publication place: Poland
- Pages: 656 (UK/US)
- ISBN: 978-0-316-42371-7
- Preceded by: The Tower of Fools
- Followed by: Light Perpetual

Warriors of God (Polish: Boży bojownicy) is a historical novel with fantasy elements, written by Andrzej Sapkowski. It is the sequel to Narrenturm in the Hussite Trilogy. Its events take place in Bohemia and Silesia, during the time of Hussite Wars.

== Plot ==
The plot of the book Warriors of God follows the previous part of Sapkowski's trilogy, Narrenturm. Reinmar of Bielawa (known as Reynevan) after his escape from Silesia joined the Czech Hussites and became a member of the Hussite military group called the "Warriors of God".

Reinmar, went to northern Bohemia together with his friend Szarlej and Samson Miodek, taking orders from the Taborites' leader Prokop the Great.

It was there that they decided to look for the wizard Rupilius the Silesian, with whose help Samson Miodek would be able to return to his world. Reynevan, who was also being followed in Bohemia by the Silesian Inquisition and the servants of the bishop of Wrocław, was captured by his enemies in Trosky Castle, from where he was only able to escape with the help of the spirit of Rupilius. Other adventures follow, up to the 1428 Battle of Nysa in Silesia.

== Publications ==
English: Warriors of God, translated by David French, Orbit 2021, ISBN 0316593249

- Czech: Boží bojovníci. Leonardo Publishers, Ostrava 2005 ISBN 80-85951-43-6
- French: Les Guerriers de Dieu, 2004
- German: Gottesstreiter, Dtv, München 2006 ISBN 978-3-423-24571-5
- Slovak: Boží bojovníci, Slovart, 2005
- Russian: Божьи воины 2006 ISBN 978-5-17-035135-0
- Ukrainian: Божі воїни: Зелений Пес, 2006 ISBN 966-365-101-6
