= The Viper (novel) =

2009 historical novel with fantasy elements written by Polish writer A. Sapkowski

The Viper (Polish: Żmija) is a 2009 historical novel with elements of fantasy by the Polish writer Andrzej Sapkowski. It is set in the framework of the Soviet–Afghan War. The title refers to the golden viper which awakens the protagonist's suppressed paranormal abilities to see the past.The novel received mixed reviews, with critics complaining that the novel from a famous writer did not meet expectations.

== Elements of fantasy ==
The protagonist is a Soviet Army praporshchik of Polish descent, Paweł Lewart. Since the childhood he had paranormal abilities, but they were suppressed by a treatment in a psychiatric hospital. However he retained some abilities to see the future, which saved his life in Afghanistan several times. While at a remote outpost, he finds a golden viper and feeds it with a dead rat. He visited the crevice with the viper several times and each time he had visions of the memories of past defeated invaders of Afghanistan: the army of Alexander the Great and the British army during the Second Anglo-Afghan War.

== Awards ==
- 2010: Mir Fantastiki magazine award for the best foreign book
- 2011: FantLab's Book of the Year Award (Russia) for the novel Żmija (The Viper) in the Best Translated Novella or Short Story category
