= Light Perpetual =

Light Perpetual may refer to:

- Light Perpetual (Sapkowski novel), a 2006 historical novel by Andrzej Sapkowski
- Light Perpetual (Spufford novel), a 2021 novel by Francis Spufford
- Eternal Rest, a prayer
