= The Tower of the Swallow =

Fourth novel in the Witcher Saga

- First edition cover
- Author: Andrzej Sapkowski
- Original title: Wieża Jaskółki
- Language: Polish
- Series: The Witcher
- Genre: Fantasy
- Published: 1997 (superNOWA) (Polish); 2016 (Orbit)
- Publication place: Poland
- Media type: Paperback
- Pages: 464
- Preceded by: Baptism of Fire
- Followed by: The Lady of the Lake

The Tower of the Swallow, published as The Tower of Swallows in the United States (Polish: Wieża Jaskółki) is the fourth novel in the Witcher Saga written by Polish fantasy writer Andrzej Sapkowski, first published in Poland in 1997. It is a sequel to the third Witcher novel Baptism of Fire and is followed by the final entry in the series, The Lady of the Lake.

== Plot ==
Vysogota, an elderly philosopher living alone in the Pereplut swamp, comes upon an injured Ciri near his retreat and takes her in, caring for her. During her recovery, Ciri recounts the events of the last few months.

Ciri was content with life among "the Rats"; however, she hears that a "princess" with her name has been presented in Nilfgaard as the intended bride of the Emperor. Ciri decides to reclaim her birthright and expose the Emperor's lie, but hears that the Rats are being tracked by a notorious bounty hunter, Leo Bonhart. She rushes back to them, but finds that Bonhart has slaughtered them. Bonhart defeats and captures Ciri.

Nilfgaard's spymaster, Vattier de Rideaux, wants Ciri captured alive, but the Imperial coroner, Stefan Skellen, secretly hired Bonhart to kill her. Instead of doing so, Bonhart has her fight for her life in a gladiatorial arena, confirming for Bonhart her identity and training as a witcher.

Meanwhile, having saved Queen Meve of Rivia, Geralt and his party – the bard Dandelion, Milva the archer, higher vampire Regis, and former Nilfgaardian soldier, Cahir – travel with her army. Geralt seeks a group of druids whom he believes can locate Ciri. During their journey, they learn that a bounty has been placed on their heads by a half-elf and a group of criminals led by a man named Nightingale. Partnering up with the young woman Angoulême, a former member of this group, they decide to ambush the bandits and discover who hired them, whom Geralt suspects is the wizard Vilgefortz. Eventually, they stumble upon the half-elf, named Schirrú. A fight breaks out, in which Cahir is injured, forcing him and Geralt into hiding. During this time, the two reconcile. They reunite with the rest of the party, who have entered Toussaint, where the druids are. They attempt to locate the criminals, but are captured instead by the druids, who kill the criminals before Geralt can question them.

Meanwhile, Geralt meets the elven sage Avallac'h, who talks to him about Ithlinne's prophecy of the end of the world. Avallac'h tells Geralt that he must not seek out Ciri, since what is predestined will happen regardless. Geralt remains committed to finding Ciri.

The kingdom of Redania's spymaster, Sigismund Dijkstra, travels to the neutral nation of Kovir, seeking financing to rebuild Redania's army in anticipation of a Nilfgaardian invasion. He discovers that the magicians of the newly formed Sorceress' Lodge have begun to establish Kovir as a nation sympathetic to magic, under their control. Sorceresses under the leadership of Phillipa Eilhart gather information on the various nations and set their own plans in motion. Triss Merigold, a member of the Lodge, privately questioning its motives, searches for information on Yennefer of Vengerberg, who is believed to be dead.

It is revealed that Yennefer survived her escape from the Lodge and took refuge in Skellige, requesting aid from the jarl, Crach an Craite, to find Vilgefortz. During her time here, she has a vision of Ragh Nar Roog, the end of the world, and is urged by what appears to be the mythical Modron Freya to choose a side. She tracks Vilgefortz to a dangerous part of the sea beyond Skellige and travels there, but she is captured by him and Schirrú. They torture her to locate Ciri through their empathic connection. She refuses to break, but inadvertently reveals Geralt's location. Vilgefortz dispatches Schirrú to kill Geralt and explains the earlier ambush.

In Vysogota's lodge, Ciri explains how she escaped. Her account is intercut with an official inquest in Nilfgaard, as a psychic named Kenna is interrogated for charges of treason.

After the events in the arena, Bonhart is viewed by Stefan Skellen, who has come to kill her. With Kenna's help, Skellen's group learn they are being stalked by Rience. Skellen, Rience, and Bonhart meet, with Rience carrying a magical device that allows Vilgefortz to communicate with them. Vilgefortz guesses that Skellen is working for several Nilfgaardian nobles, who are angry that their daughters were rejected as the Emperor's bride in favor of the fake Ciri. Skellen admits this, but he himself believes that the Emperor must be overthrown in order to convert Nilfgaard into a democracy.

While the three talk, Ciri is freed by a traitor in Skellen's group, and her magical capabilities are restored when Kenna attempts to read her mind. With her powers, Ciri escapes, but her face is wounded by Skellen. Vysogota then reveals that there are agents of Skellen waiting in ambush in nearby towns, and Ciri leaves his hideout. Soon after, Vysogota dies from a heart attack in his shack, praying to the gods to protect Ciri.

With a pair of ice skates formerly belonging to Vysogota's daughter, Ciri lures her pursuers onto a frozen lake, then strikes out of the fog. Skellen's band panics and scatters, while Rience is killed. Bonhart hangs back on the shore of the lake, expecting to capture Ciri, but to his shock, the mythical Tower of the Swallow appears out of the fog and Ciri enters, transporting her to an alternate reality. Its elf-like inhabitants say they have been expecting her.

== Translations ==
- Bulgarian (InfoDar, 2010)
- Czech (Leonardo, 1998)
- Danish (Gyldendal, 2023)
- Finnish (WSOY, 2015)
- French (Bragelonne, 2010)
- German (DTV, 2010)
- Italian (Editrice Nord, 2015)
- Portuguese (WMF Martins Fontes, 2016)
- Russian (AST, 1999)
- Lithuanian (Eridanas, 2006)
- Serbian (Čarobna Knjiga, 2013)
- Spanish (Bibliopolis, 2006)
- Ukrainian (KSD, 2016)

An English translation was released in the United States by Orbit (titled The Tower of Swallows) in May 2016, and in the United Kingdom by Gollancz (titled The Tower of the Swallow) in 2017. The Polish title refers to a singular swallow, so The Tower of the Swallow used by Gollancz is the more accurate translation.
