= Blood of Elves =

First novel in the Witcher Saga

- First edition cover
- Author: Andrzej Sapkowski
- Original title: Krew elfów
- Language: Polish
- Series: The Witcher
- Release number: 3
- Genre: Fantasy
- Published: 1994 (superNOWA) (Polish); 2008 (Gollancz) (English)
- Publication place: Poland
- Media type: Print (hardback & paperback)
- Pages: 320
- ISBN: 978-0-575-08484-1
- Preceded by: Sword of Destiny
- Followed by: Time of Contempt

Blood of Elves (Polish: Krew elfów) is the first novel in The Witcher series written by the Polish fantasy writer Andrzej Sapkowski, first published in Poland in 1994. It is a sequel to the Witcher short stories collected in the books The Last Wish and Sword of Destiny and is followed by Time of Contempt. The book won the Janusz A. Zajdel Award in 1994 and the David Gemmell Legend Award in 2009. An English translation was published in the United Kingdom in 2008 (Gollancz) and in the United States in 2009 (Orbit).

== Plot ==
About a year before the beginning of the novel, the Empire of Nilfgaard attacks the Kingdom of Cintra. Queen Calanthe, mortally wounded, commits suicide and her granddaughter, Cirilla, nicknamed Ciri, flees from the burning capital city. Emhyr var Emreis, Emperor of Nilfgaard, sends his spies to find her, as, in addition to her royal lineage, Ciri has one quarter of elven blood, giving her immense magical potential. The war ends with Nilfgaard's defeat by a coalition of the Northern Kingdoms, though the Empire retains much of its power.

Almost two years after the armistice, the rulers of the Northern Kingdoms meet in secret to discuss the political situation. Peace with Nilfgaard is not what it was supposed to be – the Empire's financial clout is ruining the northern economy, Imperial emissaries agitate aristocrats and merchants against their monarchs, elves and dwarves have formed partisan groups called Scoia'tael and are conducting acts of terror against humans – and cultists are prophesying that the world will end, unless the Savior comes from the South. The kings decide to start a war, before the Empire weakens their countries further, and to regain Cintra. They are aware that the Emperor is looking for Ciri to marry her (morganatically), and thus legitimize his occupation of Cintra. To prevent this, the monarchs decide to find and kill Ciri.

Ciri is being protected by the Witcher Geralt of Rivia, a magically and genetically mutated monster-slayer-for-hire, who takes her to the witchers' keep, Kaer Morhen, to be trained by the few remaining witchers. The oldest witcher, Vesemir, asks the sorceress Triss Merigold to help with strange behavior he had seen in Ciri. Triss eventually realizes that Ciri is a "Source". As she is unable to control Ciri's talent, she advises Geralt to seek help from his former lover Yennefer, a more experienced sorceress.

At the same time, the wizard Rience is searching for Ciri, serving an unknown powerful mage. He captures Geralt's friend, Dandelion the bard, and tortures him for information about Ciri. Dandelion is saved by the arrival of Yennefer, who engages in a magic duel with Rience. Rience escapes with his master's help, but is scarred from the encounter.

In the spring, Geralt leaves Kaer Morhen with Triss and Ciri, to deliver Ciri to the Temple School in Ellander where she would receive a "normal" education from the priestess Nenneke. On the way, Triss falls ill, and they join Yarpen Zigrin's dwarven company, who is leading a caravan for King Henselt of Kaedwen. Geralt tells Ciri about the roses of Aelirenn, an elf who died leading elven youths to fight the humans in a hopeless attack. The caravan is attacked by the Scoia'tael, and it is revealed that the escort mission was a trap set by the kings who doubted Yarpen's loyalty.

Meanwhile, Geralt tracks Rience and his employer. With the help of Dandelion, the medical student Shani, and the sorceress Philippa Eilhart, he forces a confrontation with Rience, during which both are injured. Rience's master intervenes again, opening a portal for him, and Geralt is prevented from pursuing by Eilhart.

Some time in the future, Yennefer and Ciri are about to leave the Temple School in Ellander. Yennefer asks Ciri whether she did not like her at first. A series of flashbacks details Ciri's studies with Yennefer, from the day they were introduced and back to the present. Ciri's stay in Ellander had been haunted by disturbing dreams until Yennefer's arrival, who started educating her in magic. From an initial antagonism, their relationship developed into a mother-daughter bond. Ciri admits that she did not like Yennefer, at first, and they leave.

== Characters ==
- Geralt of Rivia. A Witcher, a human who has been transformed into a supernatural monster-slayer by the ingestion of various mutagens. Although Witchers rarely get involved in politics, Geralt takes under his charge a political refugee called Ciri, the granddaughter of the previous Queen of Cintra, a kingdom destroyed by Nilfgaardian invaders. He is the protagonist of tie-in videogames The Witcher, The Witcher 2: Assassins of Kings and The Witcher 3: Wild Hunt.
- Triss Merigold. A powerful sorceress and member of the Chapter of Wizards, Triss wields significant power and unclear motives.
- Cirilla, the Lion-Cub of Cintra, is the young granddaughter of the deceased and overthrown Queen Calanthe of Cintra. The blood of the elves flow through her veins, and she is hunted down for the mysterious yet dangerous power which she possesses.
- Dandelion. Geralt's best friend. A charming, famous poet who is also a spy for the King of Redania.
- Yennefer of Vengerberg. Another member of the Chapter of Wizards, and an on-again off-again lover of Geralt's. Considered more powerful than even Triss Merrigold, Yennefer is called upon to try and gain an understanding of Ciri's power.
- Philippa Eilhart. A senior sorceress of the Chapter of Wizards, and trusted advisor to the King of Redania, alongside royal spymaster Sigismund Dijkstra. She is one of the few mages that has mastered the rare art of magical polymorphy, enabling her to transform into an owl. She aids Geralt in tracking down the renegade mage Rience who is looking for Ciri on behalf of Nilfgaard and another more powerful mage, whom she does not want Geralt to be aware of.

== Production ==
With the positive reader reception to his The Witcher short stories, Andrzej Sapkowski decided to write a fantasy saga. He claimed that Polish publishers at the time believed only fantasy authors from Anglophone countries were worth publishing and that Polish writers of the genre were too risky. SuperNowa were the only publisher willing to take the risk, and "Now everybody envies" them. For the saga, the author expanded on the story he had used for "A Question of Price" and "Sword of Destiny"; the universally known fairy tale in which a monster or sorcerer saves somebody's life and then demands payment.

== Translations ==
Cover of the UK edition

- Bulgarian (InfoDAR/ИнфоДАР 2008) ISBN 978-954-761-332-4
- Croatian
- Danish (Gyldendal, 2019) ISBN 978-870-218-901-8
- Dutch (Luitingh-Sijthoff B.V., 2014) ISBN 978-90-245-6401-9
- English
  - UK (Victor Gollancz Ltd, 16 October 2008) ISBN 0-575-08318-2
  - US (Orbit, April 28, 2009), translated by Danusia Stok. ISBN 978-031-6-02919-3
- Estonian (Varrak, 2017), ISBN 9789985341742
- Finnish (WSOY, 2012) ISBN 978-951-0-39023-8
- French (Bragelonne, 2008)
- German (Deutscher Taschenbuch Verlag, 1 November 2008) ISBN 3-423-24700-2
- Greek (Σελίνι, 2019)ISBN 9786185049782
- Hungarian (PlayON, 2013) ISBN 9789634069256
- Italian (Editrice Nord, 2012) ISBN 978-88-429-1665-9
- Japanese (2010) ISBN 978-4-15-020514-0
- Turkish (Pegasus, 2017) ISBN 9786052992715
- Slovak (Lindeni, 2022)
- Ukrainian (КСД, 2016) ISBN 978-617-12-1037-0

== Adaptations ==
In 2014 a Polish audiobook was released. It features 79 actors, music, and special effects.

It forms the primary basis of the second season of Netflix's The Witcher series, which was released in 2021.

== Reception ==
Blood of Elves was the winner of the Polish Janusz A. Zajdel Award for Best Science Fiction or Fantasy Novel in 1994. In 2009 the book won the David Gemmell Legend Award in the United Kingdom.
