= Hussite Trilogy =

Historical fantasy novels by Sapkowski

- The Tower of Fools (2002); Warriors of God (book) (2004); Light Perpetual (2006)
- Author: Andrzej Sapkowski
- Original title: Trylogia husycka
- Translator: David French
- Country: Poland
- Language: Polish
- Genre: Historical fantasy
- Publisher: superNOWA; Published in English by Hachette: UK: Victor Gollancz Ltd; US: Orbit Books
- Published: 2002–2006
- No. of books: 3

The Hussite Trilogy (Polish: Trylogia husycka, Polish pronunciation: [trɨˈlɔɡʲ.ja xuˈsɨt͡s.ka]) is a historical fantasy series of novels by Polish author Andrzej Sapkowski. It consists of three books: The Tower of Fools, Warriors of God and Light Perpetual. It is set in the Lands of the Bohemian Crown (mostly Silesia and Bohemia) during the Hussite Wars (1419–1434).

== History ==
In addition to English, the series has been translated into numerous languages, including Czech, Lithuanian, Slovakian, Russian, Serbian, German, Ukrainian, French and Spanish. The trilogy was published by Orbit in the US and Gollancz in the UK with the translation being handled by David French, who had previously worked with Sapkowski on The Witcher series.

When asked about the creation of the trilogy, Sapkowski explained that he considered The Witcher saga of Geralt well-rounded and did not want to write any sequels. Therefore, he decided to write something completely different and chose the subgenre of historical fantasy. Further, he chose the setting of Bohemia and the Hussite Wars because, as he said, he frequently visited that area, and since the Hussite Wars is an important period in these lands, there are plenty of books on the subject. Also, the Hussite Wars are closely related to the Polish history of the period.

== Reynevan ==
The main protagonist of the series is Reinmar von Bielau (Polish: Reinmar z Bielawy, i.e., Reinmar of Bielawa), known as Reynevan. He is a doctor, a magician, and eventually, a spy for the Hussites. Of nationality, he defines himself as "Silesian". He studied in Prague.

Reynevan came from Bielawa. His father died during the Battle of Grunwald on 15 July 1410. He was fighting for the Teutonic Order. His mother's name was Boguszka. His grandfather was the illegitimate son of Margareta, daughter of Duke Henry VI the Good. His brother, Peterlin, owned a dyeing company in Powojowice. Reynevan could speak German, Polish and Czech languages. Of nationality, he defines himself as a Silesian. He studied medicine and wizardry in Prague, where he met Bolko V the Hussite, who later became the Duke of Głogówek and Prudnik.

In Chapter One (Note: Chapter One: In which the reader makes the acquaintance of Reinmar of Bielawa, called Reynevan, and of his better features, including his knowledge of the ars amandi, the arcana of horse-riding, and the Old Testament, though not necessarily in that order.) of the first book of the series, a 23-year old Reynevan (Note: Quote from The Tower of Fools: "Reynevan, incidentally, was twenty-three and quite lacking in worldly experience. He had known very few Czech women, even fewer Silesians and Germans, one Polish woman, one Romani, and had once been spurned by a Hungarian woman.) is interrupted from having sex with another man's wife, and as a result most of the first book he is pursued by many who want him punished, his pursuers including the Inquisition, due to him practicing magic. At the same time, he is aided by many. As a reviewer, James Tivendale, wrote, he is "an extremely interesting lead character. He’s good-looking, charming, intelligent, a physician, is sort of an apprentice-level mage, is often foolish, makes rash decisions, and has a major weakness when it comes to the opposite sex."

Reynevan is considerably different from Geralt of Rivia, Sapkowski's most popular character – unlike his predecessor, he is very naïve and often, through his own stupidity, gets himself into trouble. In the opinion of Tivendale, Reynevan is more like Sapkowski's Dandelion. (Note: "Reynevan" is a German name for a herb, tansy, a medicine and a spice.) A reviewer from The Unseen Library notes that Reynevan, despite being annoying due to his stupid acts, "does grow on you a bit as the book progresses".

Among the multitudes of secondary characters of the first book, Reynevan's two main companions are Schaley (Czech: Šarlej), a belligerent priest, a voice of caution for an impulsive Reynevan, and Samson, a giant and wise man, possibly possessed by a demon.

In Polish audiobooks of the Hussite Trilogy, his voice actor is Lesław Żurek.
