= The Tower of Fools =

2002 novel by Andrzej Sapkowski

- Cover of the UK edition of the book
- Author: Andrzej Sapkowski
- Audio read by: Peter Kenny (English)
- Original title: Narrenturm
- Translator: David French
- Language: Polish
- Series: Hussite Trilogy
- Genre: Historical fantasy
- Published: 2002 (superNOWA) (Polish); 2020 (Gollancz) (English)
- Publication place: Poland
- Pages: 432 (UK)
- ISBN: 978-1-4732-2612-8
- Followed by: Warriors of God

The Tower of Fools (Polish original title: Narrenturm) is the first historical fantasy novel in the Hussite Trilogy written by Polish fantasy writer Andrzej Sapkowski, first published in 2002 in Polish and in English in 2020. It is followed by Warriors of God (Boży bojownicy) and Light Perpetual (Lux perpetua).

It tells the story of Reinmar of Bielawa, also called Reynevan von Bielau. The action takes place in Silesia in 1425, at the time of the Hussite Wars.

The setting is mostly historical, with some historical characters and descriptions of particular locations. Fantasy elements include occasional magical feats, artifacts, and non-human characters. The German word Narrenturm means "the Tower of Fools", it is the name of the oldest building for the accommodation of psychiatric patients in continental Europe, built in Vienna in 1784.

The Tower of Fools has been translated to Lithuanian, Czech, Slovak, Russian, Serbian, German, Ukrainian, Romanian, Bulgarian, Hungarian, Finnish, French, Spanish, Croatian, European Portuguese and Brazilian Portuguese. Rights to the English translation of the trilogy have been acquired, and it has been published in 2020 by Orbit in the US, and Gollancz in the UK, with the translator being David French, translator of several Sapkowski's Witcher books.

== Plot ==
Reinmar from Bielawa, known as Reynevan, lives in Lower Silesia in 1425 in the middle of the Hussite Wars. The Stercz brothers find Reinmar in bed with Adela von Stercz, wife of Gelfrad von Stercz. During the hero's sudden escape, one of the brothers dies in an unfortunate accident. Since then, Gelfrad's brothers want to take revenge on Reinmar and hire thugs to capture him. Reinmar decides to run away to his brother Peterlin, and on the way meets the knight Zawisza the Black. When Reinmar reaches Powojowice, where his brother was overseeing the dyeing of dresses in a fulling mill, he learns that Peterlin has been murdered. Suspicion falls on the thugs sent by the Stercz brothers. Reynevan moves on, seeking revenge on the Stercz family and heading to Ziębice, where Adela is being held, in the desire to regain his beloved. On the way, he is rescued by the mysterious Nikoletta, and then he meets the retired Szarlej, who accompanies him on his way. They meet witches who predict Reinmar's future. Together with Szarlej, they go to the convent, where they perform exorcisms and meet the giant Samson Miodek.

When the three of them arrive at the knights' tournament in Ziębice, it turns out that Adela no longer has any feelings for Reinmar and is in relationship with Prince Jan Ziębice. Reinmar tries to sneak in to see Adela but is caught and is suspected of assassination. On the way to a prison, he is rescued by a friend from college. He happens to meet tax collector and Tybalt Raabe and travel with them for a while. Thinking that his friends could be in trouble he goes back to Ziębice but meet them on the way. Szarlej and Samson had made deal with robber knights to rescue Reinmar for helping them rob the tax collector. They soon find that they had already been robbed and killed. To avenge the people who died Reinmar helps the group to rob the robbers, but it turned out the carriage to contain two maidens, one of them Nikoletta instead of the money they were after. The robber knight decides to take Nikoletta for ransom.

The trio are able to rescue Nikoletta and escape them. Reinmar and Nikoletta sleep together and Reinmar fumbles about having regretted it. She leaves and he falls asleep. After that, he meets with the others but are captured by the inquisition when a friend betrays Reinmar, and imprisons him in the Narrenturm, The Tower of Fools.

The inquirer turns out to be a friend from college who reveals that his brother was working for Hussites and tries to recruit him as a spy under threat of torture. They are fortunately rescued by Hussites who believe that Reinmar has the tax collector's money and want it for themselves. They take part in a battle which is won by Hussites and in aftermath of the battle Reinmar meets a wounded Wolfher Stercz. Reinmar says that he didn't kill Nicolaus and believes that the Sterczas didn't kill Peterlin and lets him go.
