= Time of Contempt =

Second novel in the Witcher Saga

- First edition cover
- Author: Andrzej Sapkowski
- Original title: Czas pogardy
- Language: Polish
- Series: The Witcher
- Release number: 4
- Genre: Fantasy
- Published: 1995 (superNOWA) (Polish); 2013 (Gollancz, Orbit Books) (English)
- Publication place: Poland
- Media type: Print (Hardback & Paperback)
- Pages: 352
- ISBN: 978-0-575-09094-1
- Preceded by: Blood of Elves
- Followed by: Baptism of Fire

Time of Contempt (Polish: Czas pogardy) is the second novel in the Witcher Saga written by Polish fantasy writer Andrzej Sapkowski. The novel was first published 1995 in Polish, and 2013 in English (under the title The Time of Contempt in the US, but without the article in the UK). It is a sequel to the first Witcher novel, Blood of Elves, and is followed by Baptism of Fire.

== Plot ==
Following their secret conclave in Blood of Elves, the monarchs of the Northern Kingdoms are secretly preparing to create a pretext for war with Nilfgaard. Unbeknownst to them, the Emperor of Nilfgaard is aware of their plans and preparing his own.

Geralt consults with a lawyer, Codringher, to discover the identity of the unknown mage trying to capture Ciri. At the same time, Yennefer takes Ciri from the Temple in Ellander to Gors Velen. Yennefer plans to enroll Ciri at the Aretuza school of magic on Thanedd Island, while attending a conference of mages there. While Yennefer is talking business with a dwarven banker in Gors Velen, she allows Ciri to see the city, escorted by one of the banker's young employees. While viewing an exotic menagerie, Ciri inadvertently provokes a disturbance and escapes using a magic amulet Yennefer gave her in case of emergency. This draws the attention of the mages Tissaia de Vries and Margarita Laux-Antille, the former and current headmistresses of Aretuza, out hunting for truant students.

After reuniting, Yennefer, Tissaia and Margarita discuss Ciri's upcoming education at Aretuza. Ciri, unwilling to be "imprisoned" at school, steals a horse and rides to a nearby town where she heard Geralt is staying. Yennefer pursues her, leading to a reunion and reconciliation with Geralt. The three return to Thanedd Island together.

At an evening reception, Geralt meets several mages, including the mage Vilgefortz, who hints that a power struggle is imminent and that Geralt will have to choose sides. Vilgefortz wants Geralt on his side, but Geralt prefers to remain neutral. Dijkstra, the King of Redania's spymaster, also tries to recruit Geralt, without success.

Early in the morning, Geralt stumbles on an attempted coup. Dijkstra and Philippa Eilhart, a sorceress in Redania's court, have organized the coup, ambushing several mages, including Vilgefortz, who they intend to accuse of conspiring with Nilfgaard, before the enclave; Emperor Emhyr wants the Chapter of Mages broken apart, since their participation in the previous war led to the Empire's defeat. Tissaia, the most senior mage, is furious that Philippa and her other mages have abandoned their role as neutral advisors. Yennefer, also in attendance, has brought Ciri, who lapses into a clairvoyant trance and reveals that the war has already begun: the King of Redania was assassinated the night before, and the King of Aedirn has launched an attack on Nilfgaard. Tissaia releases Vilgefortz and the captured mages to allow them to defend themselves, and drops the field that inhibits the use of magic inside Aretuza. This proves disastrous when they attack Philippa and the other Northern mages, while a Scoia'tael commando working with Nilfgaard invades the compound.

Geralt disables Dijkstra and rushes in to rescue Yennefer and Ciri. In the ensuing chaos, Yennefer and Geralt fight off the Scoia'tael, while Ciri flees from the scene. She takes refuge at the Tower of Gulls, and when Geralt pursues her, Vilgefortz confronts Geralt. Vilgefortz again asks Geralt to join his side, but Geralt refuses. A fight ensues, in which Geralt is defeated and severely wounded. Vilgefortz enters the Tower, but Ciri escapes through an unstable magic portal, releasing a flare of energy that collapses the Tower and leaves Vilgefortz's face scarred. Tissaia, realizing her mistake, takes Geralt to safety with Triss Merigold's help before committing suicide.

Soon after the events at Thanedd Island, Dandelion finds Geralt recuperating in the forest of Brokilon, under the care of the dryads, and fills him in on recent events: Aedirn, Rivia, and Lyria fell quickly to the Nilfgaardian invaders, while King Foltest of Temeria made a pact with Emhyr and preserved his kingdom; the elven mage Francesca Findabair was made the client queen of Dol Blathanna, on the condition that she allow the Scoia'tael to remain under Emhyr's control. In Nilfgaard, a false Ciri is presented to Emhyr, who publicly announces his plans to marry her and legitimize his rule of Cintra while ordering his secret forces to find the real Ciri.

Ciri awakens in the Korath desert and barely survives, with the help of a unicorn. When the unicorn is wounded in a fight with a desert creature, Ciri awakens her latent magical powers to heal it. However, the power she taps into is so potent that she sees herself as an omnipotent witch, ravaging the entire continent. Horrified, she renounces the use of magic and is captured by bounty hunters in Nilfgaard's employ. She manages to escape them with the help of the Rats, a bandit group. She gains a sense of belonging among the Rats, who are refugees from the war, as she is. She identifies herself to them as Falka, a dreaded witch from history whom she saw in her vision. The story hints that Ciri, the last descendant of a Cintran royal line that carries elven blood, is the prophesied child who will destroy the old world and usher in a new age.

== Translations ==
- Arabic (Aasser alkotb, 2025)
- Brazilian Portuguese (WMF Martins Fontes, 2014) ISBN 978-85-7827-842-7
- Bulgarian (InfoDar, 2009)
- Croatian (EGMONT, 2019) ISBN 978-953-13-1861-7
- Czech (Leonardo, 1996)
- Danish (Gyldendal, 2020) ISBN 978-870-218-904-9
- English
  - UK (Gollancz, June 2013) ISBN 978-0-575-08508-4
  - US (Orbit, August 27, 2013)
- Finnish (WSOY, 2013) ISBN 978-951-0-39752-7
- French (Bragelonne, 2009)
- German (DTV, 2009)
- Hungarian (PlayON, 2013)
- Lithuanian (Eridanas, 2006)
- Russian (AST, 1997)
- Serbian (Čarobna knjiga, 2011) ISBN 978-86-7702-229-7
- Spanish (Bibliopolis, 2004)
- Simplified Chinese (Chongqing, 2016)
- Turkish (Nefret Çağı; Pegasus, 2018)
- Ukrainian (KSD, 2016)
- Greek (Selini, 2021)
- Slovak (Lindeni, 2022)

The English (UK) translation was delayed several times; initially planned for 2009, it was published by Gollancz in June 2013. The US edition of the novel, after several delays, was published by Orbit Books on August 27, 2013.

== Adaptations ==
In 2015, a Polish audiobook was released. It is a high-end audiobook, with dozens of actors, music and special effects.

The book's plot forms the basis of the third season of Netflix's The Witcher series, which was released in 2023.

== Reception ==
James Tivendale of Fantasy Book Review wrote that "the characters and the tales [in the book] are utterly addictive" and gave it 8 out of 10 score. Andrzej Sapkowski criticized the cover of the US edition of the book, saying that it is based on Witcher video game footage, and has little connection with the book contents; Sapkowski noted that he has no influence over the American publisher's choice of cover art, which he deemed highly unfortunate.

== See also ==
- Polish literature
- Science fiction and fantasy in Poland
