= Baptism of Fire (novel) =

Third novel in the Witcher Saga

- First edition cover
- Author: Andrzej Sapkowski
- Original title: Chrzest ognia
- Language: Polish
- Series: The Witcher
- Genre: Fantasy
- Published: 1996 (superNOWA) (Polish); 2014 (Gollancz) (English)
- Publication place: Poland
- Media type: Paperback
- Pages: 352
- ISBN: 978-0-575-09097-2
- Preceded by: Time of Contempt
- Followed by: The Tower of the Swallow

Baptism of Fire (Polish: Chrzest ognia) is the third novel in the Witcher Saga written by Polish fantasy writer Andrzej Sapkowski, first published in 1996 in Polish and in English in 2014. It is a sequel to the second Witcher novel Time of Contempt and is followed by The Tower of the Swallow.

== Plot ==
In the aftermath of the Thanedd incident, war is still raging between Nilfgaard and the Northern Kingdoms. The elf sorceress Francesca Findabair has been installed by Nilfgaardian Emperor Emhyr as client queen of Dol Blathanna. In exchange for her throne, however, she is obliged to withhold aid from the elven Scoia'tael commandos, who supported Nilfgaard's initial advance into the North, but now find themselves unsupported as the Northern Kingdoms retaliate.

Geralt of Rivia recovers in Brokilon Forest under the care of the dryads, but is intent on leaving and searching for Ciri. The dryads' queen introduces him to Milva, an expert archer who ranges outside the forest, guiding scattered bands of Scoia'tael to refuge in Brokilon. Despite not liking Geralt, she agrees to accompany him and his friend Dandelion.

Along their journey, they join a group of dwarves led by Zoltan Chivay, who are also shepherding refugees. They are also shadowed by Cahir, the "Black Rider", who featured prominently in Ciri's nightmares. Initially, the knight is captured by hawkers, and Geralt saves him, but wants nothing to do with him and leaves him to his own devices. Cahir continues to shadow the witcher and his entourage and joins them through Milva's intervention. Finally, the troupe is joined by Regis, a vampire with invaluable medical skills, whom Geralt befriends. Cahir also reveals that both he and Geralt have been having the same prophetic dreams about Ciri, which is evidence that she is not in Nilfgaard, and the young woman produced by Emhyr is an impostor.

As the group travels, Milva admits that she is pregnant, the result of a liaison with a group of elves she was escorting back to Brokilon. At first, she asks Regis for a potion to help her abort the child, but after a conversation with Geralt, she decides to keep her baby. Unfortunately, they are caught between the warring factions, leading them into the Battle for the Bridge on the Yaruga, where they save Queen Meve and Milva miscarries. Geralt had previously named himself "Geralt of Rivia" despite not actually being from there. However, after the battle, the queen knights Geralt, and his title "of Rivia" becomes official.

Meanwhile, Ciri, under the alias "Falka", has settled into life with a party of young outlaws, "the Rats". Experiencing killing regularly, she becomes obsessed with it.

Three months after the collapse of the Brotherhood of Sorcerers in the Thanedd incident, Philippa Eilhart gathers a group of sorceresses—including Yennefer, whom Francesca had transformed into a jade statuette to allow her to escape Thanedd. Philippa proposes the founding of a new organization, the Lodge of Sorceresses, claiming that, rather than act as advisors to various monarchs, their magical abilities make them best qualified to rule themselves. The only way the nobility of the Northern Kingdoms would accept such rule is if they were all unified under a single monarch, who possesses both royal blood and magical ability; for example, Ciri. Philippa asks Yennefer to help the lodge, as her knowledge is essential to finding Ciri, but a Nilfgaardian sorceress, Fringilla Vigo, helps Yennefer escape so she can find Ciri on her own. Unlike Geralt, Yennefer decides to track down the rogue mage Vilgefortz, who she believes has kidnapped Ciri and who is owed retribution for his actions on Thanedd Island.

== Translations ==
- Croatian (EGMONT, 2020)
- Czech (Leonardo, 1997)
- Danish (Gyldendal, 2022)
- English (Gollancz, 2014)
- Finnish (WSOY, 2014)
- French (Bragelonne, 2010)
- German (DTV, 2009)
- Hungarian (PlayOn, 2015)
- Lithuanian (Eridanas, 2006)
- Portuguese (WMF Martins Fontes, 2015)
- Russian (AST, 1997)
- Serbian (Čarobna Knjiga, 2011)
- Spanish (Bibliopolis, 2005)
- Ukrainian (KSD, 2016)

== Adaptations ==
In 2018, a Polish audiobook was released. It is a high-end audiobook, with dozens of actors, music and special effects.

A scene in Thronebreaker: The Witcher Tales 2018 game by CD Projekt RED adapts the finale of the novel where the battle for the bridge and knighting of Geralt of Rivia happens.

The book's plot forms the basis of the fourth season of Netflix's The Witcher series, which was released in 2025.
