= Manuscript Found in a Dragon's Cave =

Guide to fantasy literature by Andrzej Sapkowski

Book cover

Manuscript Discovered in a Dragon's Cave (Polish: Rękopis znaleziony w Smoczej Jaskini (Note: The title is similar to that of Rękopis znaleziony w Saragossie)) is a guide to fantasy literature. It was written in the form of an encyclopedia by Polish writer Andrzej Sapkowski, first published by Supernowa publishing house in 2001. The author discusses in it the history of the literary genre, well-known fantasy heroes, descriptions of magic terminology, fantasy features, fantastic bestiary, major fantasy writers and characters.

Several sections of the book discuss the essence and the limits of the genre as Sapkowski defines it, albeit rather broadly.

Polish literary critic Eryk Remiezowicz writes that the book "should become required reading for Polish educators and a model for writing textbooks on any topic. Lots of information, reasoning, well, sometimes shaky, but usually surprisingly coherent. The author rarely deviates from his enlightening course (unless he absolutely has to add that one great story), and everything is served in a thickly humorous glaze that makes digestion easier." From the very beginning the author presents the text as his subjective opinion, from the definition of the genre to sharp but witty criticism of what he does not like in it.

== The fantasy canon according to Sapkowski ==
The first edition of the book contained a list of "85 titles that every self-respecting fan of the genre should know", expanded in the 2011 edition to 100. The ten emboldened titles are works that Sapkowski views as "absolutną klasykę" ("absolute classics").

Nr	Title	Forma	Author	Year(s)
1	The Hobbit, or There and Back Again	novel	J.R.R. Tolkien	1937
2	Conan	short-story series	Robert E. Howard	1932–1936
3	Harold Shea	novella series	Fletcher Pratt, L. Sprague de Camp	1940–1954
4	The Chronicles of Narnia	novel series	C.S. Lewis	1950–1956
5	Silverlock	novel	John Myers Myers	1949
6	Dying Earth	short-story series	Jack Vance	1950
7	The Lord of the Rings	novel	J.R.R. Tolkien	1954–1955
8	Fafhrd and the Gray Mouser	series of novels and short stories	Fritz Leiber	1939–1988
9	The Broken Sword	novel	Poul Anderson	1954
10	The Once and Future King	series of novels	T.H. White	1938–1977
11	Three Hearts and Three Lions	novel	Poul Anderson	1961
12	Glory Road	novel	Robert A. Heinlein	1963
13	Witch World	series of novels	Andre Norton	1963–
14	Elric of Melniboné	series of novels and short stories	Michael Moorcock	1961–
15	The Last Unicorn	novel	Peter S. Beagle	1968
16	Earthsea	series of novels and short stories	Ursula K. Le Guin	1964–2018
17	Grendel	novel	John Gardner	1971
18	Jack of Shadows	novel	Roger Zelazny	1971
19	The Chronicles of Amber	series of novels and short stories	Roger Zelazny	1970–1991
20	Watership Down	novel	Richard Adams	1972
21	Deryni	series of novels and short stories	Katherine Kurtz	1970–
22	Birthgrave	trilogy	Tanith Lee	1975–1978
23	Dragon Knight	series of novels	Gordon R. Dickson	1976–2000
24	The Forgotten Beasts of Eld	novel	Patricia A. McKillip	1974
25	The Riddle-Master trilogy	trilogy	Patricia A. McKillip	1976–1979
26	The Morgaine Stories	tetralogy	C.J. Cherryh	1976–1988
27	Die unendliche Geschichte	novel	Michael Ende	1979
28	The Chronicles of Thomas Covenant	series of novels	Stephen R. Donaldson	1977–2013
29	The Land of Laughs	novel	Jonathan Carroll	1980
30	The Vampire Tapestry	novel	Suzy McKee Charnas	1980
31	Lord Valentine's Castle	novel	Robert Silverberg	1980
32	Ariosto	novel	Chelsea Quinn Yarbro	1980
33	Little, Big	novel	John Crowley	1981
34	The Book of the New Sun	series of novels	Gene Wolfe	1980–1987
35	The Chronicles of Tornor	trilogy	Elizabeth A. Lynn	1979–1980
36	Winter's Tale	novel	Mark Helprin	1983
37	Lyonesse	trilogy	Jack Vance	1983–1989
38	Spellsinger	series of novels	Alan Dean Foster	1983–2004
39	The Belgariad, The Malloreon	series of novels	David Eddings	1982–1984, 1987–1991
40	The Mists of Avalon	novel	Marion Zimmer Bradley	1983
41	The Anubis Gates	novel	Tim Powers	1983
42	Tea with the Black Dragon	novel	R.A. MacAvoy	1983
43	The True Game	series of novels	Sheri S. Tepper	1983–1986
44	The Witches of Eastwick	novel	John Updike	1984
45	Ryhope Wood	series of novels and short stories	Robert Holdstock	1984–2009
46	The Black Company	series of novels and short stories	Glen Cook	1984–
47	The Princess Bride	novel	William Goldman	1973
48	The Ladies of Mandrigyn	novel	Barbara Hambly	1984
49	Kedrigern	series of novels and short stories	John Morressy	1981–2003
50	The Fionavar Tapestry	trilogy	Guy Gavriel Kay	1984–1986
51	Xanth	series of novels	Piers Anthony	1977–
52	Magic Kingdom of Landover	series of novels	Terry Brooks	1986–
53	The Tales of Alvin Maker	series of novels and short stories	Orson Scott Card	1986–
54	Merlin	novel	Robert Nye	1978
55	Dragonsbane	novel	Barbara Hambly	1985
56	The Winter of the World	series of novels	Michael Scott Rohan	1986–2001
57	The Eyes of the Dragon	novel	Stephen King	1984
58	Soldier	novel and sequel	Gene Wolfe	1986–1989
59	Memory, Sorrow, and Thorn	trilogy	Tad Williams	1988–1993
60	Bones of the Moon, Sleeping in Flame, A Child Across the Sky	trilogy	Jonathan Carroll	1987–1989
61	Stalking the Unicorn	novel	Mike Resnick	1987
62	The Stress of Her Regard	novel	Tim Powers	1989
63	The Healer's War	novel	Elizabeth Ann Scarborough	1988
64	Knights of Dark Renown	novel	David Gemmell	1989
65	Tigana	novel	Guy Gavriel Kay	1990
66	The Wheel of Time	series of novels	Robert Jordan, Brandon Sanderson	1990–2013
67	Beauty	novel	Sheri S. Tepper	1991
68	Briar Rose	novel	Jane Yolen	1992
69	Last Call	novel	Tim Powers	1992
70	The Innkeeper's Song	novel	Peter S. Beagle	1993
71	The Iron Dragon’s Daughter	novel	Michael Swanwick	1993
72	Winter Rose	novel	Patricia A. McKillip	1996
73	The Moon and the Sun	novel	Vonda N. McIntyre	1997
74	Jack Faust	novel	Michael Swanwick	1997
75	Lord of the Two Lands	novel	Judith Tarr	1993
76	The Death of the Necromancer	novel	Martha Wells	1998
77	Harry Potter	series of novels	J.K. Rowling	1997–2007
78	Mockingbird	novel	Sean Stewart	1998
79	The Sarantine Mosaic	novel and sequel	Guy Gavriel Kay	1998–2000
80	Tamsin	novel	Peter S. Beagle	1999
81	Symphony of Ages	series of novels	Elizabeth Haydon	1999–2002
82	Stardust, Neverwhere	novels	Neil Gaiman	1997, 1996
83	A Song of Ice and Fire	series of novels	George R.R. Martin	1996–
84	The Snow Queen	novel	Eileen Kernaghan	2000
85	Thraxas	series of novels	Martin Scott	1999–2019
Items added in the 2011 second edition:
86	Interview with the Vampire	novel	Anne Rice	1976
87	Discworld	series of novels	Terry Pratchett	1983–2015
88	His Dark Materials	trilogy	Philip Pullman	1995–2000
89	American Gods	novel	Neil Gaiman	2001
90	Perdido Street Station	novel	China Miéville	2000
91	Castle	series of novels	Steph Swainston	2004–
92	The First Law	series of novels and short stories	Joe Abercrombie	2006–
93	Jonathan Strange & Mr Norrell	novel	Susanna Clarke	2004
94	Vellum	novel	Hal Duncan	2005
95	Anansi Boys	novel	Neil Gaiman	2005
96	Temeraire	series of novels	Naomi Novik	2006–
97	The Kingkiller Chronicle	series of novels	Patrick Rothfuss	2007–
98	The Graveyard Book	novel	Neil Gaiman	2008
99	Nostradamus / Venice trilogy	trilogy	Dave Duncan	2007–2009
100	Lavinia	novel	Ursula K. Le Guin	2008
