= Andrzej Sapkowski =

Polish fantasy writer

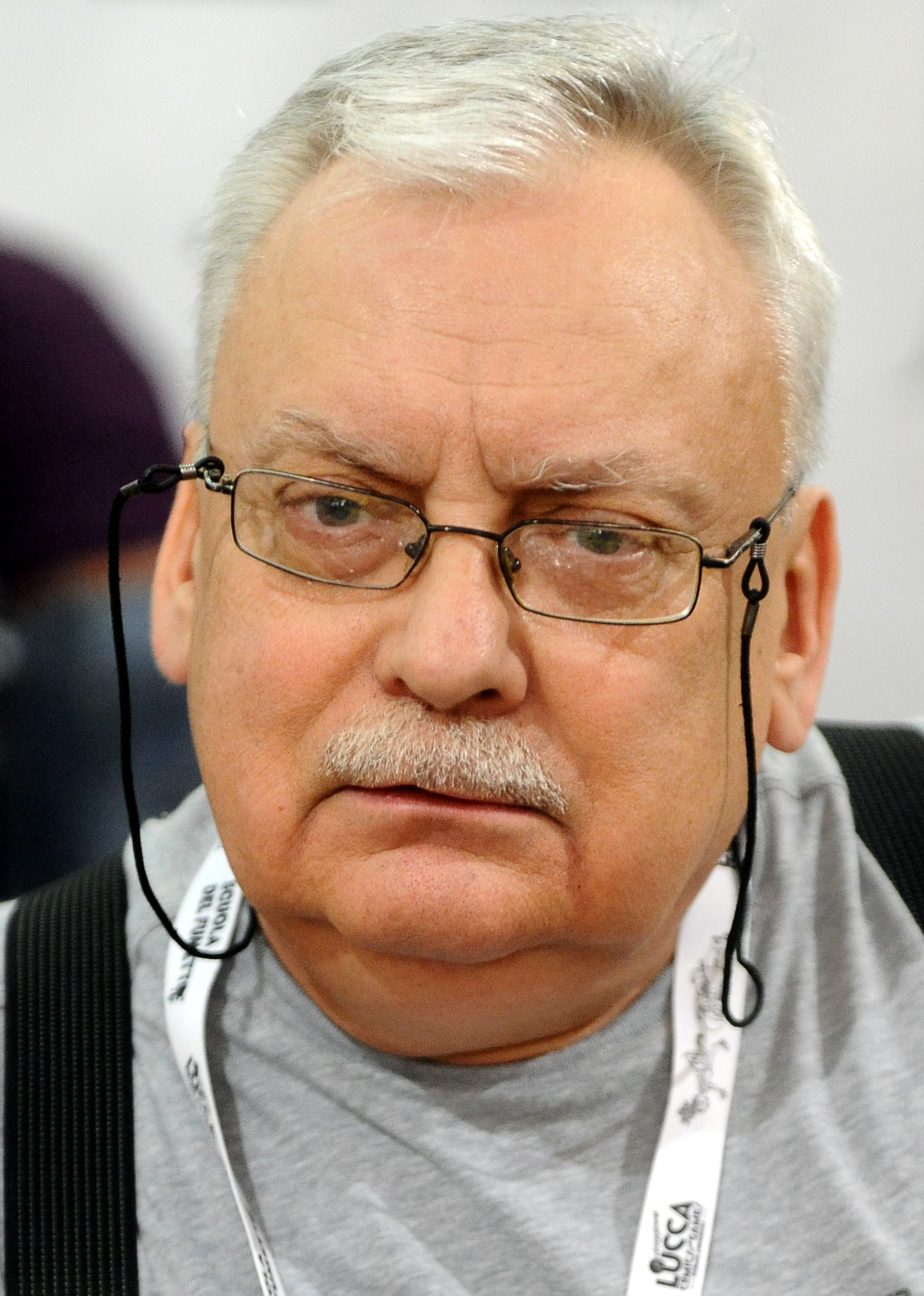
- Sapkowski at Lucca Comics & Games 2015
- Born: 21 June 1948 (age 78); Łódź, Poland
- Education: University of Łódź
- Occupations: Novelist, economist
- Writing career
- Period: 1986–present
- Genres: Fantasy, history
- Notable works: The Witcher; Hussite Trilogy
- Notable awards: Janusz A. Zajdel Award; Paszport Polityki; Medal for Merit to Culture - Gloria Artis; World Fantasy Award for Life Achievement; David Gemmell Legend Award; Ignotus Award; European Science Fiction Society Award

Andrzej Sapkowski (Polish: [ˈandʐɛj sapˈkɔfski]; born 21 June 1948) is a Polish fantasy writer. He is best known for his series of books The Witcher, which revolves around the eponymous monster hunter, or "witcher", Geralt of Rivia. The saga has been popularized through video games, television, stage, comic books and translated into 37 languages, making him the second most-translated Polish science fiction and fantasy writer after Stanisław Lem.

Described as the "Polish Tolkien", he has written multiple novels and short story collections, selling over 30 million copies worldwide. The influence of Slavic mythology is seen as a characteristic feature of many of his works. He is a six-time recipient of the Zajdel Award, Poland's most popular science fiction and fantasy prize, as well as many other awards and honors including David Gemmell Award, World Fantasy Life Achievement Award and the Gloria Artis Medal for Merit to Culture.

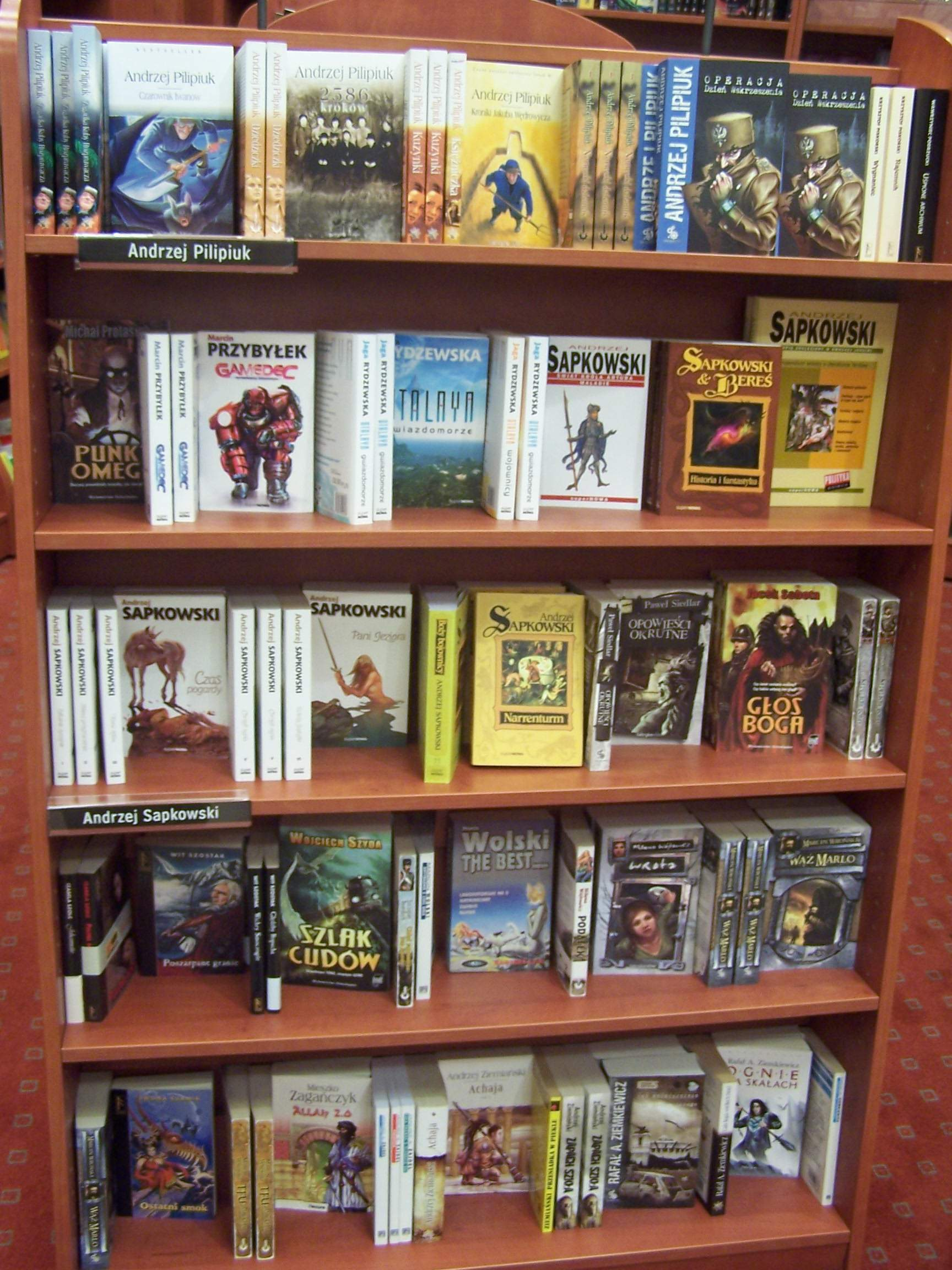
Sapkowski novels on display occupying two shelves at an Empik bookstore in Katowice, Poland

== Early life ==
Sapkowski was born on 21 June 1948 in Łódź, in central Poland. His father served in the Polish People's Army and participated in the Battle of Berlin. After the end of World War II, his parents lived near Nowa Sól before settling in Łódź. He attended the Bolesław Prus High School No. 21. He also studied economics at the University of Łódź, and before turning to writing, he had worked as a senior sales representative for a foreign trade company. He started his literary career as a translator, in particular, of science fiction. Among the first works translated by him was The Words of Guru by Cyril M. Kornbluth.

== Career ==
=== Major works ===
Sapkowski says he wrote his first short story, "The Witcher" (1986), ("Wiedźmin", also translated "The Hexer" or "Spellmaker"), on a whim, in order to enter a contest by Polish science fiction and fantasy magazine Fantastyka. In an interview, he said that being a businessman at the time and thus familiar with marketing, he knew how to sell, and indeed, he won third prize. The story was published in Fantastyka in 1986 and was enormously successful both with readers and critics. Sapkowski has created a cycle of tales based on the world of "The Witcher", comprising three collections of short stories and nine novels. This cycle and his other works have made him one of the best-known fantasy authors in Poland in the 1990s.

The main character of "The Witcher" is Geralt of Rivia, trained as a monster hunter since childhood. Geralt exists in a morally ambiguous universe, yet manages to maintain his own coherent code of ethics. At the same time cynical and noble, Geralt has been compared to Raymond Chandler's signature character Philip Marlowe. The world in which these adventures take place is heavily influenced by Slavic mythology.

In her review of Blood of Elves, Alice Wybrew of Total Sci-Fi writes that "Moving effortlessly between moments of wrought emotion and staggeringly effective action, to lengthy periods of political discussion and war stratagems, Sapkowski addresses every aspect of a good fantasy novel eloquently and with ease. His style reads as easily as David Gemmel, but hits harder and deeper than his late fantasy comrade. Creating a world that is both familiar and comfortable, it is through his inventive use of character manipulation that he generates a new and realistic experience". Alex Jay of Polygon further observes that within Sapkowski's fantasy tales, "there are parallels to the complicated history of ethnic strife and resistance to oppression in Central and Eastern Europe". The depictions of the disputes between nonhumans and humans "echo real-world disputes over territory and citizenship that draw dividing lines according to race, nationality, or ethnicity".

In 2001, he published the Manuscript Found in a Dragon's Cave, an original and personal guide to fantasy literature. It was written in the form of an encyclopaedia and the author discusses in it the history of the literary genre, well-known fantasy heroes, descriptions of magic terminology as well as major works of notable writers including J. R. R. Tolkien's The Hobbit and The Lord of the Rings, Robert E. Howard's Conan, C. S. Lewis's The Chronicles of Narnia, Ursula K. Le Guin's Earthsea, Roger Zelazny's The Chronicles of Amber, J. K. Rowling's Harry Potter, and George R. R. Martin's A Song of Ice and Fire.

Sapkowski's next book series was the Hussite Trilogy set in the 15th century at the time of the Hussite Wars with Reinmar of Bielawa as the main protagonist. Mariusz Czubaj writes:

Sapkowski's trilogy is a form of polemics with the Polish tradition of the historical novel, with let's say Kraszewski and Sienkiewicz, who wrote about cruel times while depriving them of that dose of atrocities and a most basic human dimension. Yet the author of The Witcher does not hide that his characters are not exactly subtle, but who nonetheless bask with delight in what the literature theoretician Mikhail Bakhtin once called "the material bodily lower stratum".

Although the Hussite Trilogy proved less popular compared to The Witcher, it has been described as the author's "magnum opus". Published between 2002 and 2006, the series was released as an audiobook in 2019. In August 2023, Sapkowski announced he was working on a new novel from The Witcher universe during an on-line meeting with his Ukrainian fans. He added that his work on the book "may take a year, but no longer" giving it a potential expected publication date at some point in 2024. The novel, titled Rozdroże Kruków, was published in Poland in November 2024, and released internationally as Crossroads of Ravens in September 2025.

=== Legal dispute with CD Projekt ===
In October 2018, he sent an open letter to CD Projekt demanding 60 million zloty ($16.1 million) in royalty payments from the company for using the Witcher universe in their computer games. The letter was written despite the fact that Sapkowski had sold the video game rights to the Witcher for a single sum, rather than through a royalties contract. Sapkowski and his lawyers based their claims on Article 44 of the Copyright and Related Rights Act.

CD Projekt released a statement claiming that the author's demands are groundless and that the company had legitimately and legally acquired copyright to Sapkowski's works. His decision was criticized by many commentators and gaming journalists including Dmitry Glukhovsky, the author of Metro 2033, who described him as "an old fool" and noted that without the gaming franchise, the Witcher series "would never get this crazy international readership" and would have remained popular only in Central and Eastern Europe. On 20 December 2019, the writer and the company resolved the dispute with an amicable settlement. The company stated this deal was made in an effort "to maintain good relations with authors of works which have inspired CD Projekt Red's own creations". The details of this arrangement were not made public.

== Personal life ==
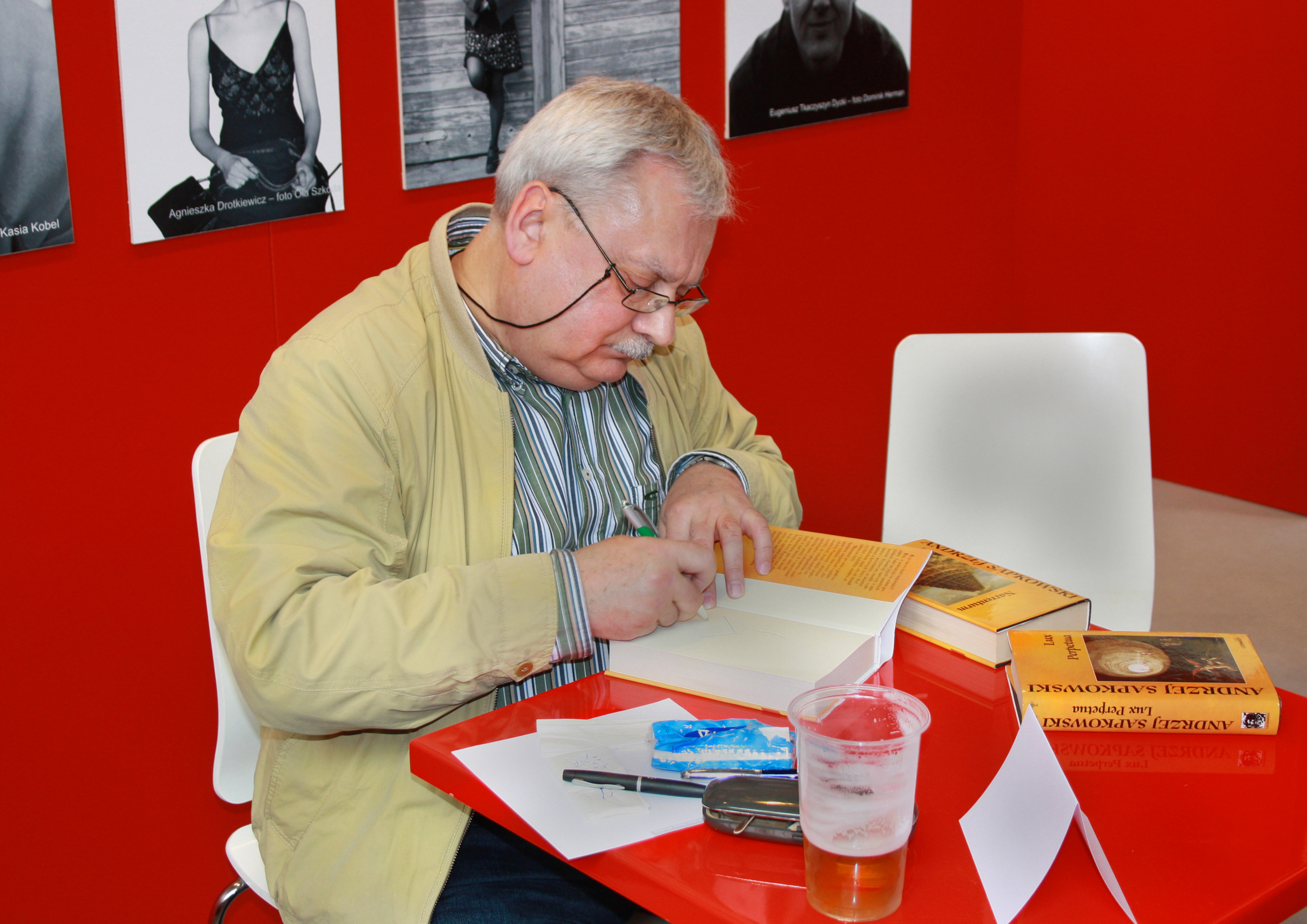
Andrzej Sapkowski at the 2010 World Book Fair in Prague, Czech Republic

Sapkowski resides in his hometown of Łódź in central Poland. He had a son named Krzysztof (1972–2019), who was an avid reader of the Polish Fantastyka magazine, and for whom he wrote the first Witcher story. Sapkowski is a member of the Polish Writers Association. In an interview, he mentioned that his favorite writers included Ernest Hemingway, Mikhail Bulgakov, Raymond Chandler and Umberto Eco. In 2005, Stanisław Bereś conducted a lengthy interview with Sapkowski that was eventually published in a book form as Historia i fantastyka.

== Translations and adaptations of Sapkowski's works ==
Sapkowski's books have been translated into Bulgarian, Chinese, Croatian, Czech, Dutch, English, Estonian, Finnish, French, Georgian, German, Greek, Hebrew, Hungarian, Italian, Japanese, Korean, Lithuanian, Norwegian, Persian, Portuguese, Romanian, Russian, Serbian, Slovak, Slovene, Spanish, Swedish, Turkish, and Ukrainian. In English, his official debut was a story from his The Witcher universe that was published in 2000 in a small press anthology Chosen by Fate. An English translation of The Last Wish short story collection was published by Gollancz in 2007. From 2008, the Witcher saga is published by Gollancz. The English translation of Sapkowski's novel Blood of Elves won the David Gemmell Legend Award in 2009.

In the years between 1993 and 1995, a six-issue comic book series entitled The Witcher was released in the Komiks magazine by Prószyński i S-ka publishing house. The comic was written by Maciej Parowski and illustrated by Bogusław Polch. The comics were the first attempt to portray the Witcher universe outside the novels. Since 2014, a comic book series The Witcher has been published by the American publisher Dark Horse Comics. The stories presented in the series are mostly originals, written not by Andrzej Sapkowski but by other writers; the exception being volume 2, Fox Children, which adapted a story from the anthology Season of Storms.

In 2001, a television series based on the Witcher cycle was released in Poland and internationally, entitled Wiedźmin (The Hexer). A film by the same title was compiled from excerpts of the television series but both have been critical and box office failures. In 2009, Russian heavy metal band Esse staged The Road with No Return, a rock opera based on the works by Sapkowski. Yevgeny Pronin is the author of the libretto and the composer of much of the opera's music. The premiere of the opera took place the same year in Rostov-on-Don and was subsequently released as a DVD in 2012.

The Polish game developer, CD Projekt Red, created a role-playing game series based on The Witcher universe. The first game, titled simply The Witcher, was first released in October 2007. The sequel, The Witcher 2: Assassins of Kings was released in 2011. The third game in the trilogy, The Witcher 3: Wild Hunt, which shipped over 40 million copies, making it one of the best selling video games of all time, was released in May 2015.

In May 2017, Netflix commissioned The Witcher, an English-language adaptation of the book series. The Witcher television series premiered on Netflix on 20 December 2019. Sapkowski served for a while as a creative consultant on the project. The popularity of the Netflix show led to Sapkowski topping Amazon's list of best-selling authors ahead of J.K. Rowling and Stephen King. An spin-off animated film, The Witcher: Nightmare of the Wolf, produced by Lauren Schmidt Hissrich, premiered in 2021. A second spinoff animation, The Witcher: Sirens of the Deep, was released on February 11 2025, adapting the short story "A Little Sacrifice" from the collection Sword of Destiny. In September 2017, a musical Wiedźmin (The Witcher) directed by Wojciech Kościelniak premiered at the Musical Theatre in Gdynia. The Witcher: Blood Origin is a fantasy miniseries created by Declan de Barra and Lauren Schmidt Hissrich adapted from The Witcher book series which serves as a prequel to the Netflix television series. It was released on Netflix in December 2022.

== Awards and recognition ==
Sapkowski is a recipient of numerous awards and honours both Polish and foreign including:

- Janusz A. Zajdel Award
  - 1990: for his short story Mniejsze zło (The Lesser Evil)
  - 1992: for his short story Miecz przeznaczenia (Sword of Destiny)
  - 1993: for his short story W leju po bombie (In a Bomb Crater)
  - 1994: for his novel Krew elfów (Blood of Elves)
  - 2002: for his novel The Tower of Fools
  - 2024: for is novel Crossroads of Ravens
- 1995: Raczyński Library Award for lifetime achievements
- 1996: European Science Fiction Society Hall of Fame: author
- 1997: Paszport Polityki, which is awarded annually to artists who have strong prospects for international success
- 2003: Ignotus Award (Spain) for The Last Wish in the Best Anthology category and for Muzykanci (The Musicians) in the Best Foreign Short Story category; Nike Award nomination (Poland's top literary prize) for his novel Narrenturm
- 2008: Honorary citizenship of the city of Łódź
- 2009: David Gemmell Legend Award
- 2010: European Science Fiction Society "European Grand Master" honorary award
- 2010: Mir Fantastiki magazine award for the best foreign book for his novella Żmija (The Viper)
- 2011: FantLab's Book of the Year Award (Russia) for his novella Żmija (The Viper) in the Best Translated Novella or Short Story category
- 2012: Tähtifantasia Award (Finland) for his short story Sword of Destiny translated from Polish by Tapani Kärkkäinen; Science Fiction & Fantasy Translation Award nomination for his novel Spellmaker, translated from the Polish by Michael Kandel
- 2016: World Fantasy Award—Life Achievement for The Witcher saga

=== Decorations ===
- 2014: Silver Gloria Artis Medal for Merit to Culture
- 2025: Gold Gloria Artis Medal for Merit to Culture

== Bibliography ==
=== The Witcher Saga ===
==== Short story collections ====
- The Witcher (Wiedźmin, 1986), five stories. It is currently out of print. However, four of its stories were reprinted in The Last Wish along with new material, while the fifth story was reprinted in Something ends, Something begins and The Malady and Other Stories.
- Sword of Destiny (Miecz przeznaczenia, 1992), six stories. English edition: 2015
- The Last Wish (Ostatnie życzenie, 1993), seven stories. English edition: 2007 (in US: 2008). Its stories (including both its original stories and the stories which it republishes from The Witcher) take place before Sword of Destiny even though it was published later.
- The short story "The Hexer" in the English anthology Chosen by Fate: Zajdel Award Winner Anthology (by SuperNOVA in cooperation with the Silesian Club of Fantasy Literature, 2000) is an English translation by Agnieszka Fulińska of the short story "The Witcher" which had previously been published in Polish in The Witcher and The Last Wish. The Last Wish was later translated into English in full.
- The short story "Spellmaker" in the English anthology A Polish Book of Monsters (edited and translated by Michael Kandel, 2010) is another translation of the short story "The Witcher" which had previously been published in The Witcher, The Last Wish, and Chosen by Fate: Zajdel Award Winner Anthology.
- Something Ends, Something Begins (Coś się kończy, coś się zaczyna, 2000), 8 stories. Only two of its stories are related to The Witcher saga ("A Road with No Return" and the titular "Something Ends, Something Begins").
- The Malady and Other Stories (Maladie i inne opowiadania, 2012), 10 stories. It includes the eight stories from Something Ends, Something Begins, as well as two new stories unrelated to The Witcher saga. The contents of the English translation is different, containing excerpts from the first and third novels, two stories from The Last Wish, and the titular short story.

==== Pentalogy ====
- Blood of Elves (Krew elfów, 1994). English edition: 2009
- Time of Contempt (Czas pogardy, 1995). English edition: 27 June 2013
- Baptism of Fire (Chrzest ognia, 1996). English edition: 6 March 2014
- The Tower of Swallows (Wieża Jaskółki, 1997). English edition: May 2016
- Lady of the Lake (Pani Jeziora, 1999). English edition: 14 March 2017

==== Prequel novels ====
- Season of Storms (Sezon burz, 2013). English edition: 22 May 2018 – set between the short stories in The Last Wish
- Crossroads of Ravens (Rozdroże kruków, 2024) – set before the short stories in The Last Wish

=== Hussite Trilogy ===
- The Tower of Fools (Narrenturm, 2002). English edition: 2020
- Warriors of God (Boży bojownicy, 2004). English edition: 2021
- Light Perpetual (Lux perpetua, 2006). English edition: 2022

=== Standalone novel ===
- The Viper (Żmija, 2009), a stand-alone novel set during the Soviet–Afghan War

=== Other works ===
- The Eye of Yrrhedes (Oko Yrrhedesa, 1995), roleplaying game
- The World of King Arthur. Maladie (Świat króla Artura. Maladie, 1995), essay and a novelette set in Arthurian mythology
- Manuscript Found in a Dragon's Cave (Rękopis znaleziony w Smoczej Jaskini, 2001, 2008, 2011 (expanded)), fantasy encyclopedic compendium

== See also ==
- Polish literature
- Science fiction and fantasy in Poland
- List of Polish writers
- Stanisław Lem
- Jacek Dukaj
- Janusz A. Zajdel Award
- Toss a Coin to Your Witcher
- Gwent: The Witcher Card Game
- The Witcher: Monster Slayer
