= Light Perpetual (Sapkowski novel) =

2006 novel by Andrzej Sapkowski

- Author: Andrzej Sapkowski
- Original title: Lux perpetua
- Translator: David French
- Language: Polish
- Series: Hussite Trilogy
- Genre: Historical fantasy
- Published: 2006 (superNOWA) (Polish); 2022 (Orbit) (English)
- Publication place: Poland
- Pages: 656 (U.S.)
- ISBN: 978-0-316-42375-5
- Preceded by: Warriors of God

Light Perpetual (Latin: Lux perpetua) is a historical novel with fantasy elements, written by Andrzej Sapkowski, the last part of the Hussite Trilogy. Its events take place in Bohemia, Silesia and Poland, during the time of Hussite Wars. Its action takes place from 1429 until the Battle of Lipany (fall of the Taborites).

The trilogy is published by Orbit in the US in 2022 and Gollancz in the UK, who have purchased the rights, with the translator being David French, translator of several Sapkowski's Witcher books.

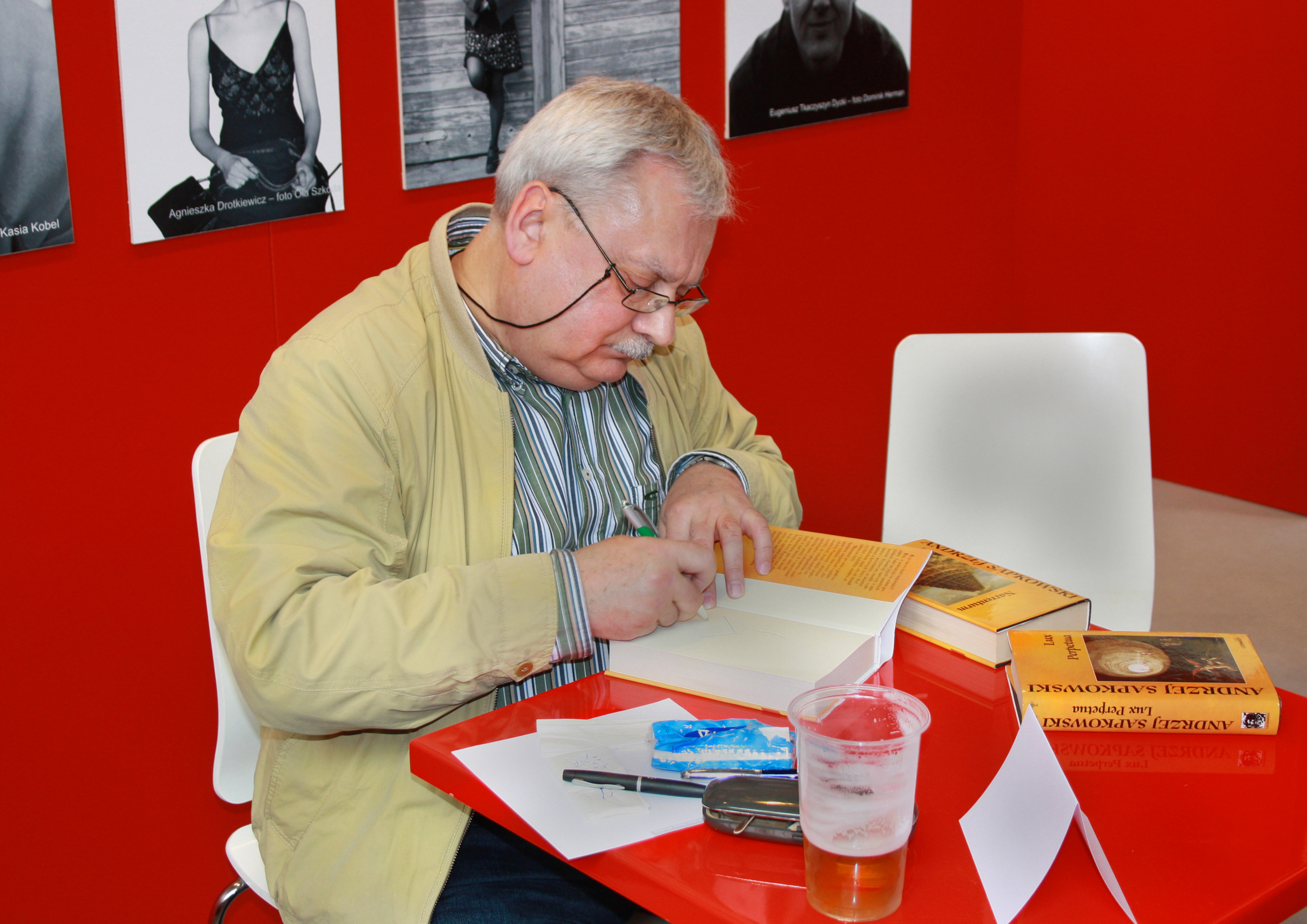
Andrzej Sapkowski signing copies of his book at Book World Fair 2010 in Prague.

== Plot ==
In Silesia, at the beginning of 1429. Reinevan is looking for his beloved Nikoletta, who was imprisoned by the people of the papal inquisition. He goes to Wrocław, where he tries to intimidate Father Felicjan, hoping that this altar boy will give him information about where his beloved is being held. At the same time, he is publicly cursed by Bishop Konrad for collaborating with the Hussites and killing Prince Jan Ziębice. Soon, Reinmar is recognized and kidnapped, and then ends up in the hands of militants led by Urban Horn. Among the prisoners is one of the black riders whose call is "Adsumus...". They go together to Prague under guard, but on the way Reinmar is freed by his old friends: Szarlej and Samson Miodek. He is also assisted by a young Jewish woman, Rixa Cartafila de Fonseca, a spy in the service of Władysław Jagiełło, King of Poland. At this time, Nikoletta, or Jutta de Apolda, is kept in a convent. Together with another young woman, Weronika, they plan an escape, which succeeds on the occasion of a visit by Nicholas of Cusa to the headquarters of the women's convent. Both travel in war-torn areas until they meet a Hussite agitator in the person of Tybald Rabe, who is Reinmar's friend. Traveling in three, they encounter black riders led by Grellenort. Jutta is captured and wounded with a poisoned item by a sorcerer. Soon Reinevan finds her, but her health is terrible. The infection spreads throughout the body and even Reinmar's medical skills are unable to help - Jutta dies in his arms. A distraught Reinevan along with Szarlej and Samson joinraids . While conquering one of the cities, Samson Miodek decides to help a group of children in a burning house. The wounds sustained prove fatal. Further fate directs Reinmar to Poland, where he meets a group of friends who plan to attack Jasna Góra. Although Reinevan personally saves the miraculous painting, he is taken prisoner, where he remains until 1434.
