= The World of King Arthur. Maladie =

Book by Andrzej Sapkowski

The World of King Arthur. Maladie (Polish: Świat króla Artura. Maladie) is a 1995 book of Andrzej Sapkowski. It consists of two parts: an essay about the Arthurian legend and a retelling-type novelette about the love of two secondary characters, Morholt and Branwen, from the legend of Tristan and Isolde. The "maladie" in the title refers to maladie d'amour, 'lovesickness'.

In 2012 "Maladie" was republished in the collection Maladie i inne opowiadania.
