= Jacek Rozenek =

Polish actor and voice actor

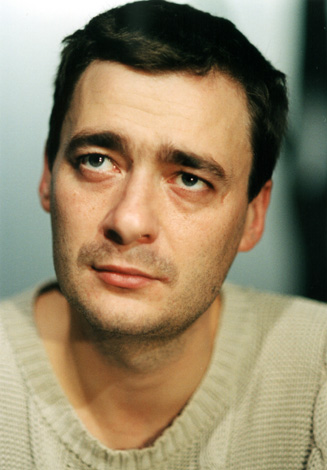
- Born: 31 March 1969 (age 57); Warsaw, Poland
- Education: Aleksander Zelwerowicz State Theatre Academy
- Occupation: Actor
- Years active: 1995–present

Jacek Rozenek (born 31 March 1969 in Warsaw) is a Polish stage, movie, television and voice actor. Among other roles, he is known for being the original Polish voice of Geralt of Rivia in The Witcher video games.

== Stroke and rehabilitation ==
In 2019 he suffered a stroke, as a result of which he has temporarily lost control over the right part of the body and the ability to speak. As he recovered both his speech and mobility, he was dismissed from hospital and is currently undergoing a full rehabilitation program at the Care and Rehabilitation Center "Forest Glade".

== Filmography ==
=== Film ===
Year	Title	Role	Notes
1997	Guarding Tess	Doug Chesnic	Voice
1997	The Batman Superman Movie: World's Finest	Clark Kent / Superman	Voice; Animated film
1998	Tekkaman Blade	Nick Carter / Blade	Voice; Animated film
1998	Dr. Dolittle	Dr. Mark Weller, Orangutan	Voice
1999	With Fire and Sword	Yuri Bohun	Dubbing
1999	Foster Family	Bib	Voice
1999	Star Wars: Episode I – The Phantom Menace	Mace Windu	Voice
1999	Pocahontas II: Journey to a New World	John Smith	Voice
2000	How the Grinch Stole Christmas	Grinch	Voice
2000	Titan A.E.	Prisoner	Voice
2001	In Desert and Wilderness	Additional Voice	Voice
2001	Spy Kids	Gregorio Cortez	Voice
2002	Star Wars: Episode II – Attack of the Clones	Mace Windu	Voice
2002	Chopin: Desire for Love	Félicien Mallefille	
2003	The Cat in the Hat	Lawrence "Larry" Quinn	Voice
2003	Finding Nemo	Ted's father	Voice
2003	Old School	Dean Gordon "Cheese" Pritchard	Voice
2003	Daddy Day Care	Charlie Hinton	Voice
2003	Spy Kids 2: Island of Lost Dreams	Gregorio Cortez	Voice
2003	Der Schuh des Manitu	Ranger	Voice
2003	8 Mile	Papa Doc	Voice
2004	Garfield	Kici Kici / Sir Roland	Voice
2004	Paycheck	James Rethrick	Voice
2004	Spy Kids 3-D: Game Over	Gregorio Cortez	Voice
2005	Surviving Christmas	Levine	Voice
2005	Star Wars: Episode III – Revenge of the Sith	Pau’anin, Mace Windu	Voice
2005	Robots	Jack Hammer	Voice
2005	Fantastic Four	Dr. Victor Von Doom / Doctor Doom	Voice
2006	The Chronicles of Narnia: The Lion, the Witch and the Wardrobe	Fox	Voice
2007	Mamuśki	Kamil Najman	
2008	The Secret	John Assaraf	Voice
2008	Star Wars: The Clone Wars	Admiral Yularen	Voice; Animated film
2008	Madagascar: Escape 2 Africa	Makunga	Voice; Animated film
2009	Popieluszko: Freedom Is Within Us	Grzegorz Piotrowski	
2009	General Nil	Colonel Józef Różański	
2010	The Last Airbender	Fire Lord Ozai	Voice
2010	Trick	Waldemar Konar	
2010	Yogi Bear	Ranger Smith	Voice
2012	Mirror Mirror	King	Voice
2016	Batman v Superman: Dawn of Justice	Bruce Wayne / Batman	Voice
2016	Suicide Squad	Bruce Wayne / Batman	Voice
2017	Thor: Ragnarok	Skurge	Voice
2017	Justice League	Bruce Wayne / Batman	Voice
2025	The Witcher: Sirens of the Deep	Geralt of Rivia	Voice; Animated film

=== Television ===
Year	Title	Role	Notes
1996-1999	Superman: The Animated Series	Clark Kent / Superman	Voice
1997-2012	The Clan	Rafał Kozień	
1998-2000	Captain Planet and the Planeteers	Kwame	Voice
1999	Miodowe lata	Jacek	Episode 38
1999	The New Addams Family	Gomez	Voice
2000	Men Behaving Badly	Ben	Voice
2001	Will & Grace	Will Truman	Voice
2001-2004	Justice League	Clark Kent / Superman	Voice
2004-2005	Na dobre i na złe	Jan Grzywacz	
2004-2006	Justice League Unlimited	Clark Kent / Superman	Voice
2004	Crime Detectives	Mariusz Chłopicki	
2004	Lauras Stern	Father	
2005-2007	Teen Titans	Slade	Voice
2008-2011	Batman: The Brave and the Bold	Clark Kent / Superman, Tigress, Buddy Blank / OMAC, General Ramjam	Voice
2009	39 and a Half	Almond	Episode 34, 37
2010	Na Wspólnej	Eryk Kuśnierz	Episode 1448, 1449
2010	Father Matthew	Jakub Gold	Episode 40
2011	Recipe For Life	Host of a culinary competition	Episode 11
2012	Barwy szczęścia	Artur Chowański	
2013	True Law	Jerzy Hartman	Episode 50
2017	Father Matthew	Marek Fornal	Episode 222
2026	The Witcher	Geralt of Rivia	Voice; Season 4

=== Video games ===
Year	Title	Role	Notes
2001	Zax: The Alien Hunter	Valeth, Azah-Pan	Voice
2002	Might and Magic IX	Forad Darre	Voice
2002	Warlords: Battlecry II	Ironbark	Voice
2003	TOCA Race Driver	Nick Landers / James Randall, Paul Craven	Voice
2005	Age of Empires III	George Washington, Pierre Beaumont	Voice
2007	Shrek the Third	Puss in Boots	Voice
2007	The Witcher	Geralt of Rivia	Voice
2008	Mass Effect	Nihlus Kryik, Major Kyle, Colonist	Voice
2009	Dragon Age: Origins	Teyrn Bryce Cousland	Voice
2009	Hannah Montana: The Movie	Bobby Ray Stewart	Voice
2009	Jak & Daxter: The Lost Frontier	Klout	Voice
2010	Shrek Forever After	Puss in Boots	Voice
2011	The Witcher 2: Assassins of Kings	Geralt of Rivia	Voice
2012	Diablo III	Belial	Voice
2014	Diablo III: Reaper of Souls	Iterael, Captain Haile	Voice
2015	Battlefield Hardline	Marijuana grower	Voice
2015	The Witcher 3: Wild Hunt	Geralt of Rivia	Voice
2015	The Witcher 3: Wild Hunt – Hearts of Stone	Geralt of Rivia	Voice
2016	The Witcher 3: Wild Hunt – Blood and Wine	Geralt of Rivia	Voice
2017	Lego Marvel Super Heroes 2	Black Knight Garret, Super-Adaptoid	Voice
2017	The Lego Ninjago Movie Video Game	Citizens	Voice
2018	Gwent: The Witcher Card Game	Geralt of Rivia	Voice
2018	Thronebreaker: The Witcher Tales	Geralt of Rivia	Voice
2020	Cyberpunk 2077	Delamain AI	Voice
