= Marcin Przybyłowicz =

Polish composer (born 1985)

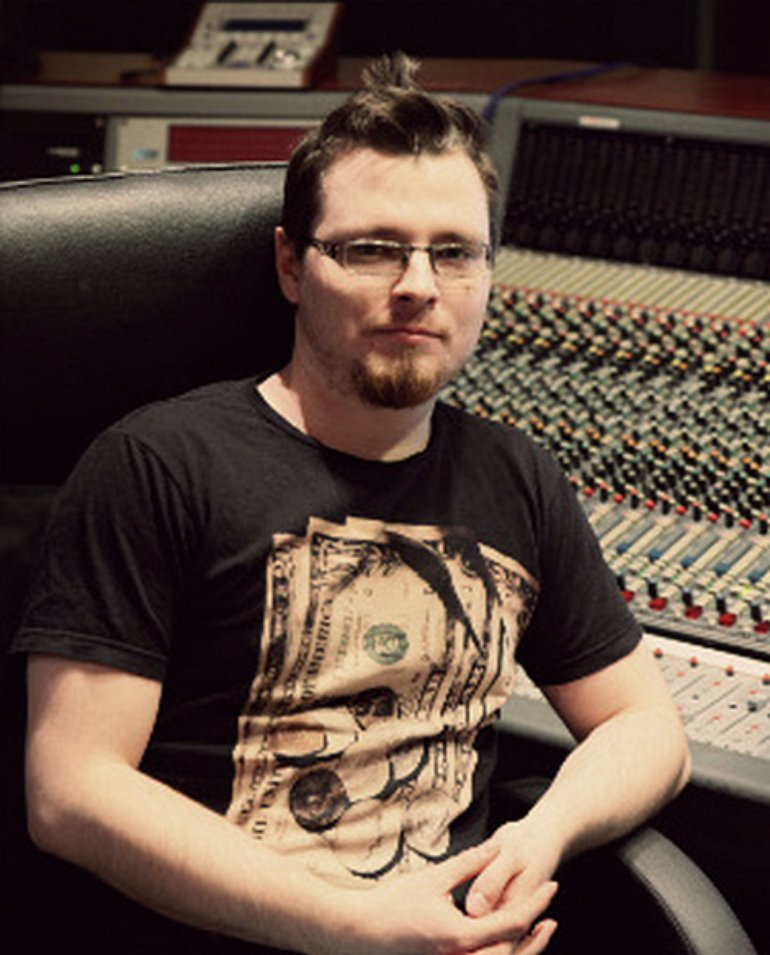
- Przybyłowicz in 2019

Background information
- Born: 4 May 1985 (age 40)
- Genres: Video game music
- Occupations: Composer; sound designer
- Website: marcinprzybylowicz.com

Marcin Przybyłowicz (born 4 May 1985) is a Polish composer and sound designer. He is mostly known for as the lead composer for The Witcher 3: Wild Hunt and Cyberpunk 2077. He also composed the score to the Polish television historical drama Korona królów. He was born on the day of the May 1985 lunar eclipse.

== Works ==
Year	Title	Role(s)	Ref(s)
2011	The Witcher 2: Assassins of Kings	Music	
2011	Hard Reset	Sound effects	
2011	Afterfall: Insanity	Music	
2014	The Vanishing of Ethan Carter	Sound effects	
2014	Ancient Space	Music	
2015	The Witcher Battle Arena	Music	
2015	The Witcher 3: Wild Hunt	Music	
2015	The Witcher 3: Wild Hunt – Hearts of Stone	Music	
2015	Hard West	Music	
2016	The Witcher 3: Wild Hunt – Blood and Wine	Music	
2016	Gloria Victis	Main theme	
2017	Full of Stars	Music	
2017	Seven: The Days Long Gone	Music	
2018	The Crown of the Kings (TV series)	Music	
2018	Phantom Doctrine	Music	
2018	Gwent: The Witcher Card Game	Music	
2018	Thronebreaker: The Witcher Tales	Music	
2020	Cyberpunk 2077	Music with P. T. Adamczyk and Paul Leonard-Morgan	
2021	Resident Evil Village	Composed "Village of Shadows"	
2023	Cyberpunk 2077: Phantom Liberty	Piano	
2023	UFO Robot Grendizer: The Feast of the Wolves	Music	
