= Cyberpunk 2077: Phantom Liberty =

2023 video game expansion

- Developer: CD Projekt Red
- Publisher: CD Projekt
- Director: Gabriel Amantangelo
- Programmer: Kacper Kościeński
- Artists: Paweł Mielniczuk; Jakub Knapik
- Writer: Tomasz Marchewka
- Composers: P.T. Adamczyk; Jacek Paciorkowski
- Series: Cyberpunk
- Engine: REDengine 4
- Platforms: PlayStation 5; Windows; Xbox Series X/S; Nintendo Switch 2; macOS
- Release: PlayStation 5, Windows, Xbox Series X/S; 26 September 2023; Nintendo Switch 2; 5 June 2025; macOS; 17 July 2025
- Genre: Action role-playing
- Mode: Single-player

Cyberpunk 2077: Phantom Liberty (Note: Polish: Cyberpunk 2077: Widmo Wolności) is a 2023 expansion pack for the 2020 video game Cyberpunk 2077 developed by CD Projekt Red. The expansion introduces a new district to the game's open world, as well as a new quest line. In a dystopian cyberpunk setting, the player assumes the role of V, a mercenary who must rescue the President of the New United States after her aircraft crashes in the lawless district of Dogtown. It was released for PlayStation 5, Xbox Series X/S, and Windows in September 2023, for Nintendo Switch 2 in June 2025, and for macOS in July 2025. The expansion received critical acclaim and is credited with renewing interest in Cyberpunk 2077. It has sold more than 10 million copies since release.

== Gameplay ==
Cyberpunk 2077 is an action role-playing video game played from a first-person perspective. The story of the Phantom Liberty expansion is set in a new district named "Dogtown", which has its own unique characters, quests, gigs, and items. Phantom Liberty introduces a new Relic skill tree with nine abilities. To unlock new Relic skills, players must progress the story of Phantom Liberty, or access restricted data terminals found in Dogtown. The expansion also raises the level cap to 60, and adds new weapons and vehicles into the game. New quickhacks are also added to the game, allowing players to perform actions such as air dashing, seeing through walls, or changing V's appearance on the fly. Vehicular combat is also added, allowing players to drive cars armed with missile launchers and machine guns. Depending on the player's decision, a new ending for the base game will be unlocked.

The Phantom Liberty expansion was marketed together with and released in a similar time frame to update 2.0 for the base game, which significantly overhauled the existing perk tree.

== Synopsis ==
=== Setting and characters ===
Cyberpunk 2077 takes place in Night City, an American megacity in the Free State of North California, controlled by corporations and unassailed by the laws of both country and state. Players take on the role of Vincent / Valerie, also known as "V" (Gavin Drea / Cherami Leigh), a mercenary who was killed, then revived by an experimental Arasaka biochip called "the Relic", and ends up with a digitized engram of legendary rock star Johnny Silverhand (Keanu Reeves) existing within their mind. Together, V and Johnny search for a way to prevent the Relic from killing the former and replacing their mind with Johnny's.

The Phantom Liberty expansion introduces the following characters: Song "Songbird" So Mi (Minji Chang), a netrunner working for the New United States of America (NUSA) Government; Solomon "Sol" Reed (Idris Elba), a Federal Intelligence Agency (FIA) operative who works for the NUSA Government as a sleeper agent; Rosalind Myers (Kay Bess), the President of the NUSA; Alena "Alex" Xenakis (Yvonne Senat Jones), Reed's former FIA partner who went undercover in the Dogtown district of Night City as a bartender; and Kurt Hansen (Eliah Mountjoy), leader of the Barghest militia who controls Dogtown. Some of the characters from the main story also appear.

=== Plot ===
Following a venture into the Pacifica district of Night City, the mercenary V is contacted by Song "Songbird" So Mi, the aide of NUSA President Rosalind Myers. She explains that their aircraft has been hacked and is about to crash in the lawless district of Dogtown, ruled by warlord Kurt Hansen. Songbird asks V to help rescue Myers in return for her assistance in preventing the Relic from destroying V's brain. V saves Myers and escorts her to a safehouse, but they lose contact with Songbird on the way.

With Songbird missing in action, Myers asks V to contact Solomon "Sol" Reed, a NUSA sleeper agent, for help. Reed successfully extracts Myers from Dogtown, after which Myers gives V and Reed a new task: rescue Songbird. Reed enlists the aid of fellow agent Alena "Alex" Xenakis and netrunner Slider in order to locate Songbird. Slider reestablishes contact with Songbird and is shocked to learn that to contact V she has been going beyond the Blackwall, the firewall that protects the world from rogue AIs, artificial intelligences that are hostile to humanity. Songbird tells V she has been captured by Kurt, while Slider is killed when the Blackwall overwhelms him.

Reed reveals that Songbird has been probing the Blackwall under Myers' orders, which is prohibited by international law. V and Reed infiltrate a party held by Kurt and meet Songbird, who explains that her mind is being corrupted by the entities from beyond the Blackwall, and a device in Kurt's possession called the Neural Matrix can cure both her and V's conditions. She sets up a plan to steal the matrix from Kurt and escape, while Reed and V deduce that Songbird orchestrated the plane crash as part of a deal with Kurt, which she later confirms. Reed resolves to rescue Songbird anyway, giving V a device that will knock her unconscious. Meanwhile, Songbird contacts V separately, asking V's help to escape from both Kurt and the NUSA. V, along with Alex, again infiltrates Kurt's headquarters and is then faced with a choice: help Songbird escape, or betray her so that Reed can take her into custody.

If V helps Songbird, Alex kills Kurt while V and Songbird flee, now fugitives hunted by the NUSA. Songbird enlists V to escape to the Moon via Night City's spaceport, but the NUSA, under Myers' personal direction, attacks the spaceport. V and Songbird fend them off, but Songbird is severely weakened after being forced to use her Blackwall powers in the process. Songbird admits to V that the matrix can only be used once, and that she had intended to betray V by using the cure on herself. V is left with the decision to surrender Songbird into Reed's custody, or kill Reed in a standoff and assist Songbird's escape to the Moon.

If V betrays Songbird, she immediately realizes V's deception. Songbird uses her Blackwall powers to flee, falling into cyberpsychosis, while Kurt kills Alex before being killed by V, or other causes if not confronted. The escaping Songbird is captured by MaxTac, after they respond to the cyberpsycho alert. Reed and V attack the convoy holding Songbird, but she flees again to Cynosure, an old Militech bunker facility, in order to connect to the Blackwall. While evading a Militech machine, which is implied to be controlled by a rogue AI, V learns about her tragic past: when caught hacking, Reed blackmailed her into leaving her friends and family behind and joining the FIA or being given up to NetWatch. Upon her enlistment, she was forcibly augmented by Myers to use as a link between the Blackwall and the real world. By the time V catches up, Songbird is already succumbing to the Blackwall's effects. Depending on V's choices, they either euthanize Songbird at her request to prevent her from falling into NUSA custody, or hand her over to Reed, who promises to help her.

If Songbird is taken into custody, a new ending to the game is unlocked. Myers congratulates V for completing their mission and Reed informs them that the matrix can be used to cure V. If V accepts, NUSA surgeons successfully remove the Relic from V's brain, but the surgery fully deletes Johnny Silverhand's engram, puts V in a two-year coma (during which most of V's friends move on), and causes irreparable damage to V's brain that renders them unable to use combat implants. Reed has taken a desk job at NUSA but has no further updates on Songbird, who he presumes is still working for Myers. Unable to return to their old life as a mercenary, V is forced to accept that they must live quietly as a regular civilian from now on, with Reed, and V's friends, Viktor "Vik" Vector and Misty helping them. If Songbird is sent to the moon or euthanized, V continues looking for a cure through other avenues.

== Development ==
Development of Phantom Liberty cost more than $60 million. In September 2022, CD Projekt Red confirmed that Phantom Liberty would be released for PC, Xbox Series X/S, and PlayStation 5 in 2023. In November 2022, it was confirmed that Phantom Liberty would be a paid expansion pack, akin to the Blood and Wine and Hearts of Stone expansions for The Witcher 3: Wild Hunt. A trailer for Phantom Liberty was released during The Game Awards 2022 which revealed Idris Elba had joined the project. A release date of 26 September 2023 for the Phantom Liberty expansion was revealed during the 2023 Xbox showcase as part of the Summer Game Fest. Pre-orders of Phantom Liberty grant the player a bonus in-game vehicle. Ahead of the release of Phantom Liberty, CD Projekt released a major title update titled Update 2.0 on 21 September for Microsoft Windows, PlayStation 5 and Xbox Series X and S, which introduces the features that were announced alongside Phantom Liberty. In December 2023, CD Projekt Red released Cyberpunk 2077: Ultimate Edition, which bundles Phantom Liberty and the base game together. Phantom Liberty was designed to be the sole expansion for Cyberpunk 2077.

For the development of Phantom Liberty, the team was inspired by the spy thriller genre. Dogtown is described to be a "rougher area" ruled by a militia leader, and a place where "unsavory characters escape to" because the corporations and the police are denied entry. The area, therefore, was designed to be "oppressive". Speaking about the game's story, senior writer Magda Zych added that Phantom Liberty's narrative supplemented the base game's themes by "extending them to politicians at higher levels and to state agencies". Idris Elba joined the project fairly early during its development, portraying Solomon Reed, a spy for the NUSA. Elba described him as the player character's "guide, or protector in some cases", but also as someone they do not know is fully trustworthy. Elba, who had a side-career as a DJ, picked music for an in-game radio station and wrote three new tracks for the expansion. P.T. Adamczyk and Jacek Paciorkowski composed the score, while Dawid Podsiadło co-wrote and performed the theme song for the expansion.

== Reception ==
Cyberpunk 2077: Phantom Liberty

Aggregate score
Aggregator	Score
Metacritic	PC: 89/100; PS5: 87/100; XSXS: 89/100

Review scores
Publication	Score
Destructoid	8.5/10
Game Informer	8.5/10
GameSpot	10/10
GamesRadar+	4.5/5
IGN	9/10
PC Gamer (US)	87/100

Phantom Liberty received "generally positive" from critics, according to review aggregator website Metacritic.

Ted Litchfield from PC Gamer described Phantom Liberty as "a tense spy thriller" filled with "gruesome" choices, and "a thrilling capstone for Cyberpunk 2077's 3-year redemption arc". Wesley LeBlanc from Game Informer praised Phantom Liberty, along with the 2.0 update, as a "culmination" of work CD Projekt spent on reworking Cyberpunk 2077 following its initial launch in 2020. He liked the new ending, and praised the gameplay improvements which made stealth gameplay enjoyable. Writing for GameSpot, Michael Higham gave the game a perfect score, giving strong praise to the game's story, side content and characters. He concluded his review by saying that "Phantom Liberty is Cyberpunk 2077 at its best", and praised it for respecting genre traditions and delivering a story that is "cruel, sobering, and bittersweet".

=== Sales ===
As of October 2023, Phantom Liberty has sold 3 million units in a week after release. By November 2023, Phantom Liberty had sold 4.3 million units. In May 2025, CD Projekt said that the expansion had sold over 10 million units.

=== Accolades ===
Award nominations for Cyberpunk 2077: Phantom Liberty
Award	Date	Category	Recipient(s)	Result	Ref.
British Academy Games Awards	11 April 2024	Evolving Game	Cyberpunk 2077: Phantom Liberty	Won	
D.I.C.E. Awards	15 February 2024	Role-Playing Game of the Year	Cyberpunk 2077: Phantom Liberty	Nominated	
Digital Dragon Awards	20 May 2024	Best Polish Game	Cyberpunk 2077: Phantom Liberty	Won	
Digital Dragon Awards	20 May 2024	Best Polish Game Design	Cyberpunk 2077: Phantom Liberty	Nominated	
Digital Dragon Awards	20 May 2024	Best Polish Game Visual Art	Cyberpunk 2077: Phantom Liberty	Nominated	
Digital Dragon Awards	20 May 2024	Best Polish Game Audio	Cyberpunk 2077: Phantom Liberty	Nominated	
Digital Dragon Awards	20 May 2024	Best Polish Narrative	Cyberpunk 2077: Phantom Liberty	Won	
Game Audio Network Guild Awards	21 March 2024	Audio of the Year	Cyberpunk 2077: Phantom Liberty	Nominated	
Game Audio Network Guild Awards	21 March 2024	Best Audio Mix	Cyberpunk 2077: Phantom Liberty	Nominated	
Game Audio Network Guild Awards	21 March 2024	Best Cinematic& Cut Scene Audio	Cyberpunk 2077: Phantom Liberty	Nominated	
Game Audio Network Guild Awards	21 March 2024	Best Game Foley	Cyberpunk 2077: Phantom Liberty	Nominated	
Game Audio Network Guild Awards	21 March 2024	Best Game Trailer Audio	Cyberpunk 2077: Phantom Liberty	Nominated	
Game Audio Network Guild Awards	21 March 2024	Best UI, Reward, or Objective Sound Design	Cyberpunk 2077: Phantom Liberty	Nominated	
Game Developers Choice Awards	18–22 March 2024	Best Narrative	Cyberpunk 2077: Phantom Liberty	Honorable mention	
Game Developers Choice Awards	18–22 March 2024	Best Technology	Cyberpunk 2077: Phantom Liberty	Honorable mention	
Golden Joystick Awards	10 November 2023	Best Game Expansion	Cyberpunk 2077: Phantom Liberty	Won	
Golden Joystick Awards	10 November 2023	Best Game Trailer	Cyberpunk 2077: Phantom Liberty	Won	
Golden Joystick Awards	10 November 2023	Best Supporting Performer	Idris Elba	Nominated	
Golden Trailer Awards	30 May 2024	Best Video Game Trailer	Cyberpunk 2077: Phantom Liberty	Won	
New York Game Awards	23 January 2024	Big Apple Award for Game of the Year	Cyberpunk 2077: Phantom Liberty	Nominated	
New York Game Awards	23 January 2024	Herman Melville Award for Best Writing in a Game	Cyberpunk 2077: Phantom Liberty	Nominated	
New York Game Awards	23 January 2024	Statue of Liberty Award for Best World	Cyberpunk 2077: Phantom Liberty	Nominated	
New York Game Awards	23 January 2024	NYC GWB Award for Best DLC	Cyberpunk 2077: Phantom Liberty	Won	
New York Game Awards	23 January 2024	Great White Way Award for Best Acting in a Game	Idris Elba	Nominated	
The Game Awards	December 7, 2023	Best Performance	Idris Elba	Nominated	
The Game Awards	December 7, 2023	Best Narrative	Cyberpunk 2077: Phantom Liberty	Nominated	
The Game Awards	December 7, 2023	Best Ongoing Game	Cyberpunk 2077: Phantom Liberty	Won	
The Game Awards	December 7, 2023	Players' Voice	Cyberpunk 2077: Phantom Liberty	Nominated	
Visual Effects Society Awards	21 February 2024	Outstanding Visual Effects in a Real-Time Project	Jakub Knapik, Paweł Mielniczuk, Maciej Włodarkiewicz & Kacper Niepokólczycki	Nominated	
