= The Witcher 3: Wild Hunt – Blood and Wine =

Second expansion pack for The Witcher 3: Wild Hunt

- Developer: CD Projekt Red
- Publisher: CD Projekt (Note: Distributed in North America by Warner Bros. Games, Western Europe, Australia and New Zealand by Bandai Namco Entertainment and Japan by Spike Chunsoft)
- Director: Konrad Tomaszkiewicz
- Programmer: Grzegorz Mocarski
- Writer: Marcin Blacha
- Composers: Marcin Przybyłowicz; Mikolai Stroinski; Piotr Musiał
- Series: The Witcher
- Engine: REDengine 3
- Platforms: PlayStation 4; Windows; Xbox One; Nintendo Switch; PlayStation 5; Xbox Series X/S; Nintendo Switch 2
- Release: PS4, Windows, Xbox One; 31 May 2016; Nintendo Switch; 15 October 2019; PS5, Xbox Series X/S; 14 December 2022
- Genre: Action role-playing
- Mode: Single-player

The Witcher 3: Wild Hunt – Blood and Wine (Polish: Wiedźmin 3: Dziki Gon – Krew i wino) is the second expansion pack for the 2015 video game The Witcher 3: Wild Hunt, following the first expansion, Hearts of Stone. Developed by CD Projekt Red, the expansion follows Geralt of Rivia as he travels to Toussaint, a duchy untouched by the war taking place in the base game, as he hopes to track down a mysterious beast terrorizing the region.

Blood and Wine was released for PlayStation 4, Windows, and Xbox One on 31 May 2016, and later released for the Nintendo Switch on 15 October 2019, with PlayStation 5 and Xbox Series X/S versions released on 14 December 2022. The expansion received widespread acclaim from critics, winning a number of awards. Many consider it to be one of the best downloadable content packs of all time.

== Plot ==
Geralt accepts a contract from Duchess Anna Henrietta of Toussaint, tasking him with slaying a mysterious monster that killed two of the duchy's knights. Arriving in the region, he learns there has been a third victim, with rumors claiming the knights were ritually murdered for violating their oaths. Realizing one of the knights who escorted him to Toussaint is the next target, Geralt rushes to his side and catches the culprit red-handed: Dettlaff van der Eretein, a vampire. However, their fight is interrupted by another vampire: Geralt's supposedly deceased friend Regis, who convinces Dettlaff to leave.

Regis explains to Geralt that Dettlaff revived him following his death by giving him his own blood, and he doubts that he is committing these murders willingly. Working together, Geralt and Regis locate Dettlaff's hideout and discover that someone abducted his human ex-lover, Rhenawedd, to force him to murder the knights. With the blackmailer having stolen ducal family possessions as his only lead, Geralt investigates with Henrietta, who fears that her long-lost sister Syanna, who was exiled for supposedly being afflicted by a fauxy curse, is somehow involved.

Locating the blackmailer's headquarters, Geralt, Regis, Dettlaff, and the duchy's knights stage an assault. However, upon confronting Rhenawedd, it is revealed that she and Syanna are the same person; she faked her own kidnapping and orchestrated the murders as revenge against the victims, who abused her whilst escorting her out of the duchy during her exile. Betrayed, Dettlaff snaps and attacks Toussaint's capital with a horde of vampires lest Syanna surrender herself to him. In turn, Henrietta confines Syanna to protect her and orders Geralt to kill Dettlaff.

To find Dettlaff, Geralt has two choices: give in to his demand by freeing Syanna, or find the Unseen Elder, the head of Toussaint's vampires, and have him force Dettlaff into an audience. From here, three endings are available:

- If Geralt frees Syanna, Dettlaff will immediately kill her upon confronting him. The witcher can then either fight Dettlaff or let him go. Regardless, Geralt is arrested for ducicide, but his friend Dandelion convinces Henrietta to release him. Afterward, Geralt can finish his investigation into the murders and uncover that Henrietta was Syanna's last target, revenge for abandoning her, leaving the duchess devastated.
- If Geralt also retrieved Syanna's protective ribbon, it will teleport her away when Dettlaff attempts to kill her. Enraged, the vampire then attacks the witcher, forcing Regis to kill him. Afterward, if Geralt uncovers that Henrietta was the last murder target, he can convince Syanna to forgive her, resulting in the sisters reconciling if successful.
- If Geralt goes to the Unseen Elder, he convinces him to summon Dettlaff, after which he fights and slays him. Afterward, regardless of whether Geralt finishes his investigation, Syanna will kill Henrietta and subsequently be killed by guards herself, leaving Toussaint in mourning.

Either way, if Dettlaff was killed, Regis is forced to leave Toussaint to avoid persecution by other vampires. Afterward, depending on his choices in the base game, Geralt can return to the vineyard estate that he obtained as part of his reward to find a surprise visitor:

- If Geralt romanced either Yennefer or Triss, she will move in with him.
- If Geralt romanced no one and Ciri survived, she will visit him.
- If Geralt either romanced no one and Ciri did not survive, or if the player did a standalone expansion playthrough, Dandelion will drop by.

== Release ==
On 7 April 2015, CD Projekt announced two expansion packs for The Witcher 3: Wild Hunt—the first expansion being Hearts of Stone and the second being Blood and Wine. Blood and Wine was released on 31 May 2016. It was later released alongside Hearts of Stone in a complete edition for the Nintendo Switch on 15 October 2019. A third expansion, Songs of the Past, is scheduled to release in 2027.

== Reception ==
Reception

Aggregate score
Aggregator	Score
Metacritic	(PC) 92/100 (PS4) 91/100 (XBO) 94/100

Awards
Publication	Award
The Game Awards 2016	Best Role Playing Game
2017 National Academy of Video Game Trade Reviewers	Art Direction, Period Influence

Blood and Wine received "universal acclaim" from critics, according to review aggregator website Metacritic. Many reviewers praised the way CD Projekt Red ended the storyline of the character Geralt of Rivia and the size of the expansion, with some saying it could be a new project. In a PC Gamer review by Tom Senior, he praised the developers for making such an in-depth expansion, and if they kept getting released, he'd still be playing The Witcher in 2020. Senior commended the farewell to the series. The Escapist writer Steven Bogos stated it was a good expansion overall, but was not the adventurous "save the world" storyline like previous Witcher titles.

Richard Cobbett for Rock, Paper, Shotgun wrote that the game was not CD Projekt Red's best work, saying it had a good story but not as good as Hearts of Stone's. In contrast, Chris Carter for Destructoid believed Blood and Wine was better than Hearts of Stone due to the latter feeling like a "polished, elongated quest". "Blood and Wine is sometimes as thematically dark as its predecessors", Kevin VanOrd said in a GameSpot review, although when compared to other aspects of The Witcher 3, it was less grim. Leif Johnson for IGN had initial doubts due to the slow start but started to "love it" within the first few hours of gameplay. Shacknews writer Josh Hawkins noted he experienced a few problems and bugs in the expansion, but believed it to be a good addition to the series.
