= Adam Levy (actor) =

British actor

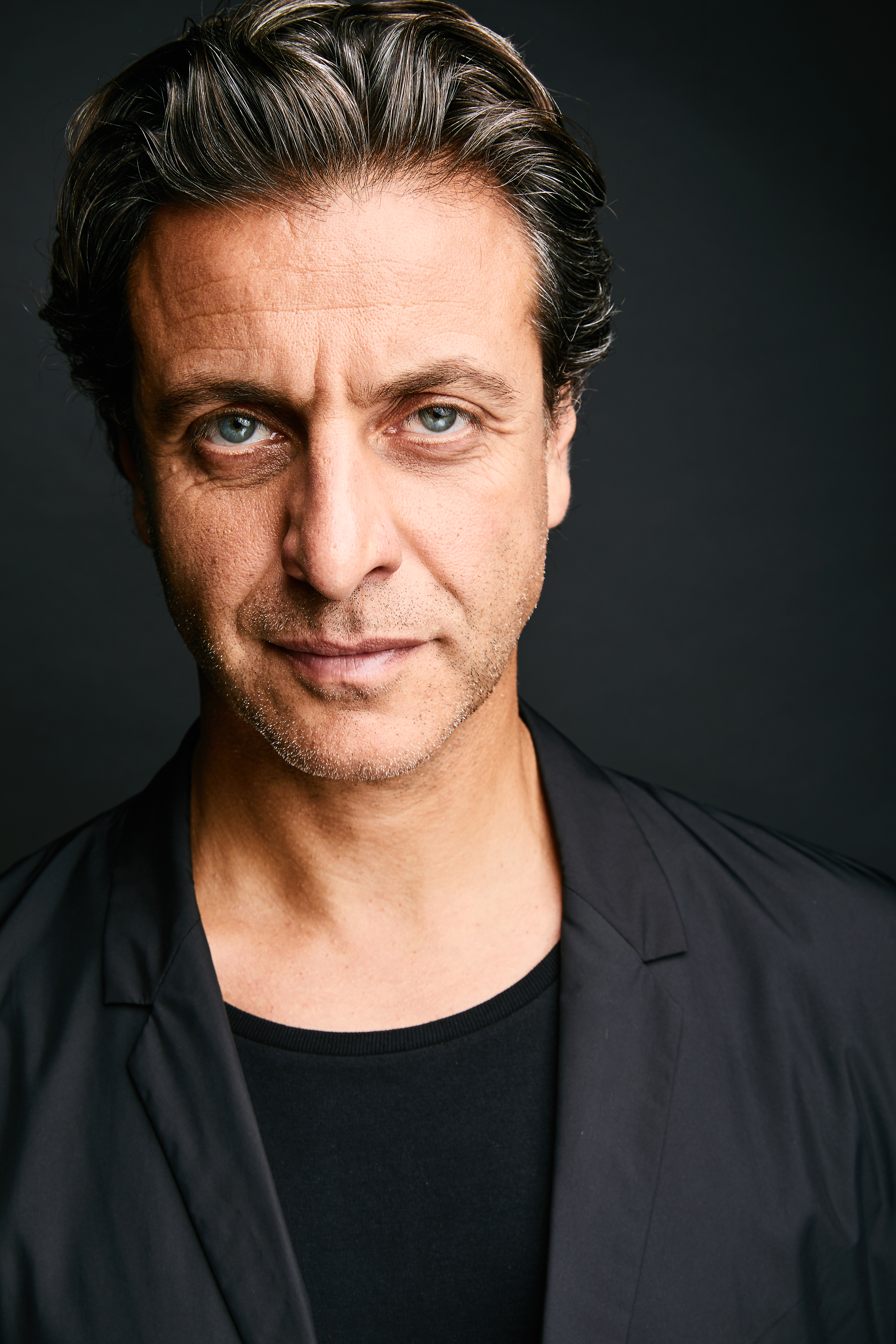
- Born: 5 December 1970 (age 55)
- Occupation: Actor

Adam Levy (born 5 December 1970) is a British actor best known for his role as Peter in A.D. The Bible Continues.

== Career ==
Levy trained at the Royal Academy of Dramatic Art (RADA) and spent a great deal of his early career working in theatre where he was a member of the Royal National Theatre and The Royal Shakespeare Company (RSC) acting companies over a period of years and performed in a wide variety of Shakespeare productions. This included the part of Paris in Peter Stein’s Royal Shakespeare production of Troilus and Cressida, Dauphin in Nicholas Hytner’s National Theatre production of Henry V, and Paulina in Ed Hall's all-male Propeller production of The Winter's Tale.

His stage debut happened aged 21, when Levy was cast by Alan Ayckbourn as Judd Hirsch’s son in the Herb Gardner stage comedy Conversations With My Father.

In 2007, Levy played Louis in the revival of Tony Kushner's 'Angels in America' and in 2008, Adam was cast as the lead villain in the West End Musical 'Zorro' where he played Zorro's arch-nemesis Ramon.

He appeared as Dr. Nicolae Belisarius in "Falling Darkness", S4:E4 of Lewis, in 2010.

In 2012, Levy was cast in a major role alongside Danny DeVito and Richard Griffiths in the comedy The Sunshine Boys at the Savoy Theatre as DeVito's nephew.

On television, Levy has played a number of supporting roles including the part of Bentivoglio in Borjia for Atlantic Productions and in 2015 was cast in the lead role of disciple Peter in all 12 episodes of NBC show A.D. The Bible Continues filmed in Morocco.

Levy was cast in Ridley Scott's Gladiator as one of his earliest film roles though his scenes were eventually cut and in 2014 appeared in Before I Go To Sleep with Nicole Kidman.

In 2015, Levy worked in the feature Music, War and Love directed by Martha Coolidge due for release in summer 2016. This was delayed, and eventually released in 2019, as I’ll Find You.

In 2018, he starred in some Season 4 episodes of Supergirl in the recurring role of Amadei Derros, an alien guru with healing powers.

In 2019, Levy was featured in the first (and second) season of the Netflix original series The Witcher as the druid Mousesack.

From 2022 to 2024, he played Charles Hanani on the HBO/BBC financial drama Industry.

== Personal life ==
Levy is Jewish.
