= The Witcher 3: Wild Hunt – Songs of the Past =

Third expansion pack for The Witcher 3: Wild Hunt

- Developers: CD Projekt Red; Fool's Theory
- Publisher: CD Projekt
- Series: The Witcher
- Engine: REDengine 3
- Platforms: Nintendo Switch 2; PlayStation 5; Windows; Xbox Series X/S
- Release: 2027
- Genre: Action role-playing
- Mode: Single-player

The Witcher 3: Wild Hunt – Songs of the Past (Polish: Wiedźmin 3: Dziki Gon – Pieśni przeszłości) is the upcoming third expansion pack for the 2015 video game The Witcher 3: Wild Hunt. It is set to be released in 2027 for Nintendo Switch 2, PlayStation 5, Windows and Xbox Series X/S. The previous expansion, Blood and Wine, was released in May 2016.

== Development ==
Songs of the Past was co-developed between CD Projekt Red and Fool's Theory. Fool's Theory was founded in July 2015 by Jakub Rokosz, a former senior quest designer at CD Projekt Red who worked on The Witcher 3: Wild Hunt. In 2022, Fool's Theory had been tasked with developing a remake of The Witcher (2007) in Unreal Engine 5 but work on the project stalled due to the need to wait for technical dependencies shared with The Witcher IV's development to be resolved. However, by the end of 2024, a portion of Fool's Theory had been assigned to provide support on The Witcher IV.

The first reports that a third expansion for The Witcher 3 was in development came in June 2025 from Polish industry insider Borys Nieśpielak. In November 2025, CD Projekt chief financial officer Piotr Nielubowicz said in the company's Q3 2025 earnings call that "new content [...] may see release in the coming year" that could have "an impact" on their financial results. Co-CEO Michał Nowakowski also mentioned that there was an "other project" in development at Fool's Theory in addition to their work on the announnced The Witcher (2007) remake and their support work on The Witcher IV. In December, Polish analyst Mateusz Chrzanowski wrote a report about the upcoming expansion being developed by Fool's Theory and that its release "should kick off the proper marketing campaign for The Witcher IV". Chrzanowski claimed that the expansion would have a production budget of 52 million zł (ca. €12 million/US$14 million).

=== Gameplay ===
As an expansion coming 11 years after the release of the base game, CD Projekt Red and Fool's Theory did not feel the need to make significant changes to gameplay design in Songs of the Past as The Witcher 3 had "aged really well" and its mechanics were "still very relevant" according to Fool's Theory CEO Jakub Rokosz. Geralt receives a new weapon in Songs of the Past in the form of a silver chain wrapped around his arm to handle crowds of enemies. It can be deployed in combat similar to a sign or bomb. The chain previously appeared in the intro cinematic for The Witcher (2007).

=== Narrative and setting ===
The previous expansion, Blood and Wine, ended as a natural conclusion to Geralt's story with him retired on his vineyard estate in Toussaint. CD Projekt Red VP story director Marcin Blacha said that Geralt's ending in Blood and Wine was "certainly something we thought through" when conceptualising a new expansion and thought that Geralt would not turn down a request from his best friend Dandelion when he comes calling. Songs of the Past is set in the new region of Letten in northern Redania, located in the north of the Continent. It's close to the regions of Kovir and Poviss, where The Witcher IV is set. CD Projekt Red described Letten as an "idyllic land [...] rich in rural tradition and folklore" where its people "enjoy a fulfilling life of bountiful harvests and lavish festivals". They drew inspiration from rural regions in Poland for Letten. Fool's Theory CEO Jakub Rokosz said that the story was written "years ago" by original CD Projekt Red writers Ola Motyka and Philip Weber. CD Projekt Red set the story aside and it resurfaced years later when Fool's Theory had grown in size and began working on the expansion. Weber recalled that Fool's Theory took "the bones of this story" that had been scrapped and expanded it into Songs of the Past. The narrative is a "completely original story" that does not take direct inspiration from any of Andrzej Sapkowski's Witcher novels. Instead, the novels were a "starting point" for the character of Dandelion, and his close relationship with Geralt, with the narrative acting as a more in-depth character study. According to CD Projekt Red senior quest designer Despoina Anetaki, "we didn't have the space" to fully explore Dandelion's relationship with Geralt in the base game as it primarily dealt with Geralt's relationship with Ciri. Dandelion has been called back to his ancestral home in Letten in Songs of the Past with Geralt encountering Dandelion's family for the first time, such as his cousin Lilla.

=== Technology ===
With the Songs of the Past expansion, CD Projekt Red discontinued support for the DirectX 11 version of The Witcher 3 in favour of exclusively supporting DirectX 12. The December 2022 "Next-Gen" update for The Witcher 3 added DirectX 12 support for its ray tracing implementation while the previous DirectX 11 version was maintained without receiving all of the update's graphical upgrades. Alongside Songs of the Past, the minimum hardware requirements on PC were increased "to ensure smooth performance and compatibility going forward" according to CD Projekt Red.

== Release ==
Songs of the Past was announced on 27 May 2026, 10 years after the release of the previous expansion Blood and Wine. A day previously, CD Projekt Red had announced a Blood and Wine anniversary stream set for 28 May. They had originally planned to announce Songs of the Past on 28 May but it was accidentally revealed early through CD Projekt Red's REDlauncher. CD Projekt Red were originally planning to release Songs of the Past in 2026 but delayed it to 2027 "to achieve the best possible result" according to co-CEO Michał Nowakowski. On 21 July 2026, it was reported that Songs of the Past would be revealed at Gamescom on 25 August. It is set to be released on Nintendo Switch 2, PlayStation 5, Windows, and Xbox Series X/S.
