= The Witcher 3: Wild Hunt – Hearts of Stone =

Expansion pack for The Witcher 3: Wild Hunt

- Developer: CD Projekt Red
- Publisher: CD Projekt
- Director: Konrad Tomaszkiewicz
- Programmer: Grzegorz Mocarski
- Writer: Marcin Blacha
- Composer: Marcin Przybyłowicz
- Series: The Witcher
- Engine: REDengine 3
- Platforms: PlayStation 4; Windows; Xbox One; Nintendo Switch; PlayStation 5; Xbox Series X/S; Nintendo Switch 2
- Release: PS4, Windows, Xbox One; 13 October 2015; Nintendo Switch; 15 October 2019; PS5, Xbox Series X/S; 14 December 2022
- Genre: Action role-playing
- Mode: Single-player

The Witcher 3: Wild Hunt – Hearts of Stone (Polish: Wiedźmin 3: Dziki Gon – Serca z kamienia) is the first expansion pack for the 2015 video game The Witcher 3: Wild Hunt. Developed by CD Projekt Red, Hearts of Stone was released for PlayStation 4, Windows, and Xbox One on 13 October 2015, later released for the Nintendo Switch on 15 October 2019, with PlayStation 5 and Xbox Series X/S versions released on 14 December 2022. The expansion is an adaptation of the Polish folktale of Pan Twardowski, following Geralt of Rivia coming in contact with a mysterious man known as Gaunter O'Dimm, and his connections to Olgierd von Everec, a cursed nobleman.

== Plot ==
Geralt accepts a contract from nobleman Olgierd von Everec to slay a giant toad monster, during which he reunites with his old acquaintance Shani. However, upon killing the monster, it is revealed to actually be a cursed prince from the distant country of Ofier. Geralt is then captured by the prince's guards, who take him on a boat back to their homeland to be tried for regicide. Fortunately, he is approached en route by a mysterious man named Gaunter O'Dimm, who offers to help him escape in exchange for a favor. Geralt accepts, after which he gets branded with a mysterious mark as the boat sinks in a sudden storm, allowing him to escape.

The favor O'Dimm needs Geralt for is revealed to be to collect a debt from Olgierd, for which their contract states that he must fulfill three wishes for the nobleman via proxy. O'Dimm also reveals that it was Olgierd who cursed the prince in the first place. Confronting Olgierd, the nobleman acquiesces to the terms of the contract by giving Geralt his first two wishes, intentionally making them virtually impossible: to entertain his deceased brother Vlodimir and retrieve Maximilian Borsodi's house, a casket containing the deed to the Borsodi family business. The witcher fulfills his first wish by summoning Vlodimir's spirit with O'Dimm's help and allowing him to possess him during a wedding party that Shani invited him to, while completing the second by participating in a heist with a disowned Borsodi family member.

For the last wish, Olgierd tasks Geralt with retrieving a long-withered flower he gifted to his ex-wife, Iris. Traveling to Olgierd's former home, Geralt finds that Iris is dead and her spirit haunts the estate. Shown the spector's memories, he learns that Olgierd and Iris' betrothal was nearly cancelled, with her instead being promised to the Ofieri prince, after the Borsodis bankrupted his family, prompting his deal with O'Dimm—who is implied to be a powerful demon: his soul and Vlodimir's life to restore his fortune and marry Iris, and then "live like there was no tomorrow"; however, O'Dimm twisted his words by giving him a "heart of stone", rendering him unable to feel emotions, causing his and Iris' marriage to crumble slowly. Confronting Iris' spirit, the memory of Olgierd's gifted flower is revealed to be what anchors her to the living world, and Geralt can either take the memory itself, in which case she passes on, or a painting of it.

Having fulfilled Olgierd's last wish, Geralt meets with him when O'Dimm arrives and attempts to collect the former's soul. From here, two endings are available:

- If Geralt does nothing, or did not research O'Dimm with Shani, he kills Olgierd and claims his soul before leaving after rewarding the witcher for his services.
- If Geralt comes to Olgierd's defense, he stakes both their souls in a wager against O'Dimm. In the end, Geralt beats O'Dimm in a trial of his own construction, forcing him to release both him and Olgierd. Afterward, freed from his heart of stone, Olgierd is regretful of his past actions and, after thanking Geralt for giving him another chance, vows to start life anew.

== Gameplay ==
Gameplay does not differ much from the base game apart from a different story and exclusive quests. The expansion contains several new weapons and items, for example, the Runewright system, where Ofieri craftsmen offer Runes (upgrades for weapons and armor) to the player in exchange for money.

== Release ==
On 7 April 2015, CD Projekt announced two expansion packs for The Witcher 3: Wild Hunt— the first expansion being Hearts of Stone and the second being Blood and Wine. Hearts of Stone was released on 13 October 2015. A third expansion, Songs of the Past, is scheduled to release in 2027.

== Reception ==
Reception

Aggregate score
Aggregator	Score
Metacritic	(PC) 89/100 (PS4) 90/100 (XBO) 90/100

Hearts of Stone received highly positive reviews from critics, with the PlayStation 4 and Xbox One versions garnering "Universal Acclaim", according to the review aggregator website Metacritic. The game scored a 9/10 from reviewers at both IGN and GameSpot.
