= The Witcher 3: Wild Hunt =

2015 video game

- Developer: CD Projekt Red (Note: Additional programming by D3T. Ported to Nintendo Switch by Saber Interactive. The remastered version was co-developed by Yigsoft.)
- Publisher: CD Projekt
- Directors: Konrad Tomaszkiewicz; Mateusz Kanik; Sebastian Stępień
- Producers: Piotr Krzywonosiuk; Jędrzej Mróz
- Artist: Marian Chomiak
- Writer: Marcin Blacha
- Composers: Marcin Przybyłowicz; Mikolai Stroinski
- Series: The Witcher
- Engine: REDengine 3
- Platforms: PlayStation 4; Windows; Xbox One; Nintendo Switch; PlayStation 5; Xbox Series X/S; Nintendo Switch 2
- Release: PS4, Windows, Xbox One; 19 May 2015; Nintendo Switch; 15 October 2019; PS5, Series X/S; 14 December 2022; Remastered; Windows, PS5, Xbox Series X/S, Nintendo Switch 2; 29 September 2026
- Genre: Action role-playing
- Mode: Single-player

The Witcher 3: Wild Hunt (Note: Polish: Wiedźmin 3: Dziki Gon) is a 2015 action role-playing game developed and published by CD Projekt. It is the sequel to the 2011 game The Witcher 2: Assassins of Kings and the third game in The Witcher video game series, played in an open world with a third-person perspective. The games follow The Witcher series of fantasy novels by Polish author Andrzej Sapkowski.

The game takes place in a fictional fantasy world based on Slavic folklore. Players control Geralt of Rivia, a monster slayer for hire known as a Witcher, and search for his adopted daughter, Ciri, who is on the run from the Wild Hunt. Players battle the game's many dangers with weapons and magic, interact with non-player characters, and complete quests to acquire experience points and gold, which are used to increase Geralt's abilities and purchase equipment. The game's story has three possible endings, determined by the player's choices at key points in the narrative. Development began in 2011 and lasted for three and a half years. Central and Northern European cultures formed the basis of the game's world. The game was developed using the REDengine 3. The music was primarily composed by Marcin Przybyłowicz and performed by the Brandenburg State Orchestra.

The Witcher 3: Wild Hunt was released for PlayStation 4, Windows, and Xbox One in May 2015, with a Nintendo Switch version released in October 2019, and PlayStation 5 and Xbox Series X/S versions (subtitled "Complete Edition") released in December 2022. The game received critical acclaim, with praise for its gameplay, narrative, world design, combat, and visuals, although it received minor criticism due to technical issues. It holds more than 200 game of the year awards and has been cited as one of the greatest video games ever made. The game has sold over 65 million units as of May 2026, making it one of the best-selling video games of all time. Two expansion packs were also released to critical acclaim: Hearts of Stone and Blood and Wine. A remastered version, which is free of charge for all existing owners, was released in September 2026, for Windows, PlayStation 5, Xbox Series X/S, and Nintendo Switch 2. A third expansion, Songs of the Past, is scheduled for a 2027 release, and a sequel, The Witcher IV, is in development.

== Gameplay ==
Gameplay screenshot of Geralt using the Igni sign against an enemy

The Witcher 3: Wild Hunt is an action role-playing game with a third-person perspective. Players control Geralt of Rivia, a monster slayer known as a Witcher. Geralt walks, runs, rolls and dodges, and (for the first time in the series) jumps, climbs and swims. He has a variety of weapons, including bombs, a crossbow and two swords (one steel and one silver). The steel sword is used primarily to kill humans while the silver sword is more effective against creatures and monsters. Players can draw out, switch and sheathe their swords at will. There are two modes of melee attack; light attacks are fast but weak, and heavy attacks are slow but strong. Players can block and counter enemy attacks with their swords. Swords have limited endurance and require regular repair. In addition to physical attacks, Geralt has five magical signs at his disposal: Aard, Axii, Igni, Yrden and Quen. Aard prompts Geralt to unleash a telekinetic blast, Axii confuses enemies, Igni burns them, Yrden slows them down and Quen offers players a temporary, protective shield. The signs use stamina, and cannot be used indefinitely. Players can use mutagens to increase Geralt's magic power. Geralt loses health when attacked by enemies, although wearing armour can help reduce health loss. Health is restored with meditation or consumables, such as food and potions. Players occasionally control Ciri, Geralt's adoptive daughter who can teleport short distances.

The game uses dynamic environments, for instance, the day-night cycle influences some monsters; a werewolf becomes powerful during the night of a full moon. Players can learn about their enemies and prepare for combat by reading the in-game bestiary. When they kill an enemy, they can loot its corpse for valuables. Geralt's witcher sense enables players to find objects of interest, including items that can be collected or scavenged. Items are stored in the inventory, which can be expanded by purchasing upgrades. Players can sell items to vendors or use them to craft potions and bombs. They can visit blacksmiths to craft new weapons and armorers with what they have gathered. The price of an item and the cost of crafting it depend on a region's local economy. Players earn experience points by completing quests. When a player earns enough experience, Geralt's level increases and the player receives ability points. These points may be used on four skill trees: combat, signs, alchemy and general. Combat upgrades enhance Geralt's attacks and unlock new fighting techniques; signs upgrades enable him to use magic more efficiently, and alchemy upgrades improve crafting abilities. General upgrades have a variety of functions, from raising Geralt's vitality to increasing crossbow damage.

The game focuses on narrative and has a dialogue tree which allows players to choose how to respond to non-player characters. Geralt must make decisions which change the state of the world and lead to 36 possible endings, affecting the lives of in-game characters. He can have a romantic relationship with some of the game's female characters by completing certain quests. In addition to the main quests, books offer more information on the game's world. Players can begin side quests after visiting a town's noticeboard. These optiomnmissions include Witcher Contracts (elaborate missions requiring players to hunt monsters) and Treasure Hunt quests, which reward players with top-tier weapons or armour. The game's open world is divided into several regions. Geralt can explore each region on foot or by transportation, such as a boat. Roach, his horse, may be summoned at will. Players can kill enemies with their sword while riding Roach, but an enemy presence may frighten the horse and unseat Geralt. Points of interest may be found on the map, and players receive experience points after completing mini-missions in these regions. Players can discover Places of Power for additional ability points. Other activities include horse racing, boxing and card playing; the card-playing mechanic was later expanded into a standalone game, Gwent: The Witcher Card Game.

== Synopsis ==
=== Setting ===
The game is set in the Continent, a fictional fantasy world based on Slavic folklore. It is surrounded by parallel dimensions and extra-dimensional worlds. Humans, elves, dwarves, monsters, and other creatures co-exist on the Continent, but non-humans are often persecuted for their differences in the northern realms. The Continent is caught up in a war between the empire of Nilfgaard – led by Emperor Emhyr var Emreis (Charles Dance), who invaded the Northern Kingdoms – and Redania, ruled by King Radovid V. Several locations appear, including the free city of Novigrad, the Redanian city of Oxenfurt, the no man's land of Velen, the city of Vizima (former capital of the recently conquered Temeria), the Skellige islands (home to several clans who resemble Norse-Gaels), and the witcher stronghold of Kaer Morhen.

=== Characters ===
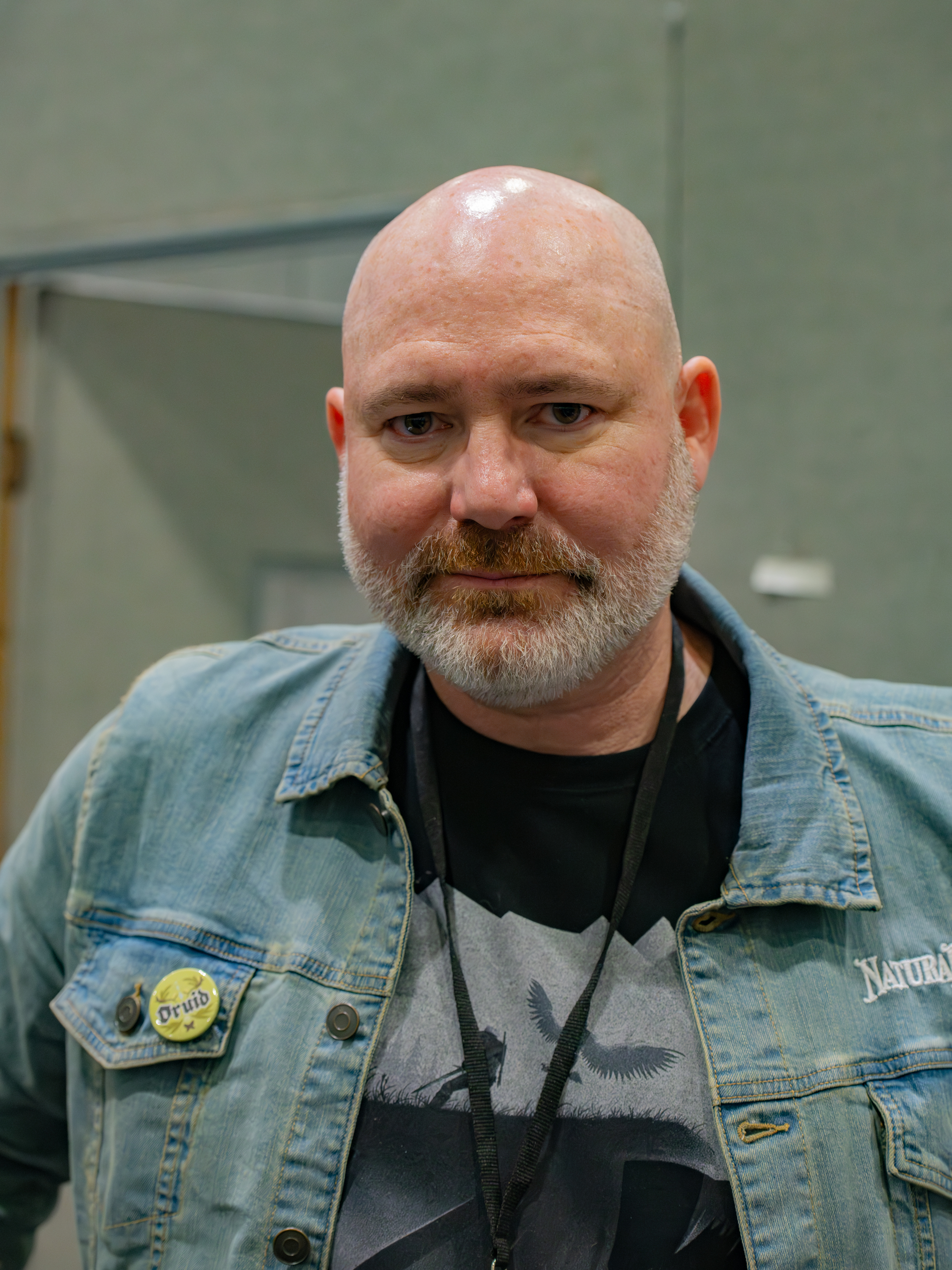
Doug Cockle reprised his role as Geralt of Rivia in the game.

The main character is the Witcher, Geralt of Rivia (Doug Cockle), a monster hunter trained since childhood in combat, tracking, alchemy and magic, and made stronger, faster and resistant to toxins by mutagens. He is aided by his lover, the powerful sorceress Yennefer of Vengerberg (Denise Gough), his former love interest Triss Merigold (Jaimi Barbakoff), the bard Dandelion (John Schwab), the dwarf warrior Zoltan Chivay (Alexander Morton), and Geralt's witcher mentor Vesemir (William Roberts). Geralt is spurred into action by the reappearance of his and Yennefer's adopted daughter, Ciri (Jo Wyatt). Ciri is a Source, born with innate (and potentially vast) magical abilities; after the apparent death of her parents, she was trained as a witcher while Yennefer taught her magic. Ciri disappeared years before to escape the Wild Hunt, a group of spectral warriors led by the King of the Wild Hunt: the elf Eredin (Steven Hartley), from a parallel dimension.

=== Plot ===
Geralt and his mentor Vesemir arrive at the town of White Orchard in search of the former's long-lost lover, Yennefer. After slaying a griffin terrorizing the area, Yennefer approaches Geralt and takes him to meet Nilfgaardian Emperor Emhyr, who orders him to join their search for his daughter Ciri—Geralt's adopted daughter—the last heir to an ancient elven bloodline that allows her to manipulate space-time, for which the enigmatic Wild Hunt pursues her. Geralt learns of three places Ciri was seen: the war-ravaged province of Velen, the free city-state of Novigrad, and the Skellige Isles.

In Velen, Geralt discovers that Ciri battled witches before finding refuge with the Bloody Baron, a warlord ruling the province. Investigating the witches, Geralt stumbles upon the sorceress Keira Metz, who is in hiding following the events of The Witcher 2: Assassins of Kings, and learns from her that the witches Ciri fought are the Crones, three malicious sisters who watch over Velen, and that Ciri has a mysterious elf companion. Approaching the baron, in exchange for finding his missing family, the warlord reveals that he sent Ciri to Novigrad.

Arriving at Novigrad, Geralt reunites with several old acquaintances, including his ex-lover Triss, and uncovers that Ciri sought out his friend Dandelion, but they ran afoul of Novigrad's crime bosses while seeking to cure a curse. Working together, Geralt and his friends rescue Dandelion, who explains that Ciri teleported away to escape pursuit.

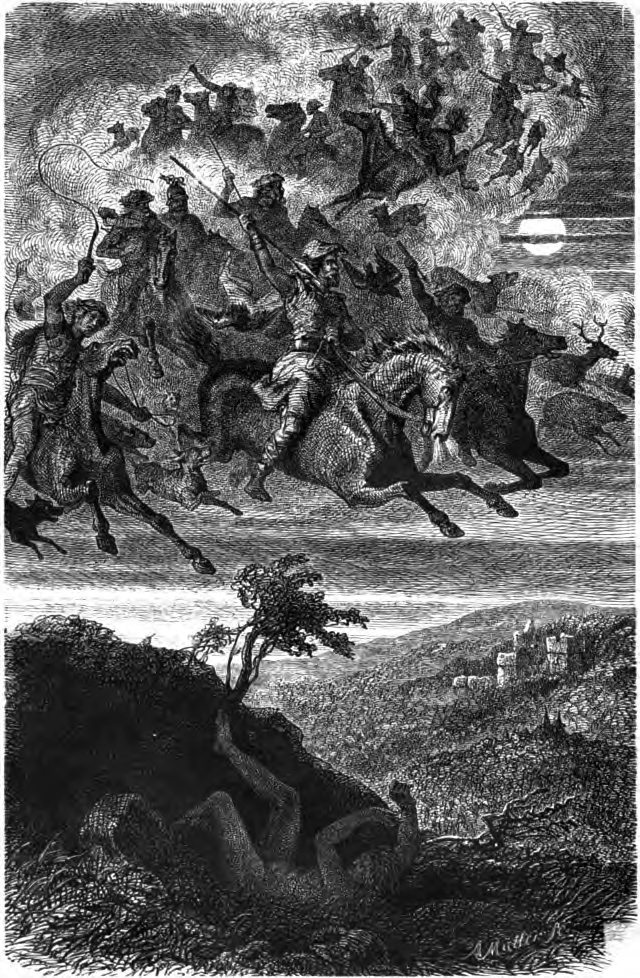
The Wild Hunt (here, Wotan's Wild Hunt by Friedrich Wilhelm Heine) is the game's main antagonist.

Sailing to Skellige, Geralt reunites with Yennefer, whose investigation reveals that Ciri first came to the isles with her companion but got separated when the Wild Hunt attacked, which is how she ended up in Velen. They also discover that, following her escape in Novigrad, Ciri teleported to the Skelligen village of Lofoten, where she and her companion reunited. However, the Wild Hunt attacked again, forcing them to flee by boat. When the boat returned to shore, its only occupant was Uma, a deformed creature that Geralt saw with the Bloody Baron.

Deducing Uma is the curse victim Ciri sought to cure, Geralt takes him to the witcher school at Kaer Morhen. Working with Yennefer and his fellow witchers, Geralt breaks the curse and restores Uma's true self: Ciri's companion, Avallac'h. It is discovered that when Avallac'h and Ciri were first in Skellige, they encountered the Wild Hunt and its leader, Eredin. During the confrontation, Eredin put a curse on Avallac'h—He began turning into Uma—before Avallac'h teleported Ciri to Velen. Ciri traveled from Velen to Novigrad before reuniting with Avallac'h who was slowly turning into Uma. The duo returned to Skellige where, after another confrontation with the Wild Hunt, Avallac'h explains that he placed her in an enchanted sleep on a magical island to safeguard her from the Wild Hunt. Avallac'h completely turned into Uma shortly after placing Ciri in the enchanted sleep.

Traveling to the magical island, Geralt reunites with Ciri and learns from her that Eredin wants her powers to save his home world from a magical force known as the White Frost, which moves between the worlds and turns them into frozen wastelands. Returning to Kaer Morhen, they are pursued by the Hunt and face them upon arrival, but are outmatched, resulting in Vesemir being killed and causing Ciri to unleash her uncontrolled power, prompting the Hunt to retreat.

Taking the fight to the Wild Hunt, Geralt and Ciri ambush and kill Imlerith—Vesemir's killer—at a Witches' Sabbath hosted by the Crones; two Crones are also slain, but the third escapes. Meanwhile, Triss and Yennefer reform the Lodge of Sorceresses to aid their fight, and Avallac'h prepares a trap for the Hunt by luring them to Skellige. In the ensuing battle, Geralt personally faces and slays Eredin. However, before he dies, Eredin claims that Avallac'h plans to use Ciri's power for his own ends.

After the Wild Hunt is defeated, the White Frost suddenly begins encroaching on the Continent. In the chaos, Geralt and Yennefer pursue Avallac'h, only to find Ciri alive and well, and she reveals that Avallac'h only ever intended to fight the White Frost. Ciri then faces the White Frost and destroys it, with her survival depending on the player's choices throughout the game.

Depending on whether Ciri survives, three different endings are possible:

- If Ciri survives and Geralt previously took her to meet Emhyr, she will become empress of Nilfgaard.
- If Ciri survives but did not meet Emhyr, or Nilfgaard lost the war, Geralt helps her fake her death, and she becomes a witcher.
- If Ciri dies, Geralt hunts down the last Crone before quietly mourning her.

== Development ==
Although the game was planned to begin production in 2008, CD Projekt Red's preoccupation with Rise of the White Wolf pushed it back to 2011. The company developed The Witcher 3: Wild Hunt with a self-funded budget of US$81 million (Note: Reports conflict on the exact figure. The total was estimated at $67–81 million, with $12.2–32.4 million for production and an additional $25–35 million for marketing.) over three-and-a-half years. The project began with 150 employees, eventually growing to over 250 in-house staff. 1,500 people were involved in the production globally. While the game is based on Andrzej Sapkowski's novels, it is not an official continuation of them, and Sapkowski's involvement with the game was limited to the creation of its in-game map. The game was localised in 15 languages, with a total of 500 voice actors. The game was scripted concurrently in Polish and English to alleviate difficulty in localisation. According to Side (the company which handled voice casting and recording), the 450,000-word script had 950 speaking roles. The voices were recorded from late 2012 to early 2015. CD Projekt Red wanted the game to be free of any digital rights management (DRM) due to the developer's unsuccessful control of piracy with its predecessor, The Witcher 2: Assassins of Kings, whose DRM also made it run slowly.

The Witcher 3: Wild Hunt was created with the REDengine 3, CD Projekt Red's proprietary game engine designed for nonlinear role-playing video games set in open world environments, aided by the PlayStation 4 and Xbox One consoles and prepared for use in October 2014. The first play-through indicated to the developers that the open world, despite its content and generation around the quests, seemed empty. As a solution, they added points of interest. The game had 5,000 bugs that December, which (with a launch date of February 2015) necessitated its postponement. Like the previous two Witcher games, players are given a complex story with multiple choices and consequences. Unlike other game engines, REDengine 3 permits a complex storyline without sacrificing virtual world design. The user interface was made more intuitive with grid-based solutions. The camera system was improved to use long shots for battles with multiple enemies and close-ups for more intimate confrontations. More animations were used for combat sequences than in The Witcher 2, with each lasting less than one second for quick succession. Game director Konrad Tomaszkiewicz and senior game designer Damien Monnier cited Dark Souls and Demon's Souls as influences on Wild Hunt's combat system, and level designer Miles Tost and senior environment artist Jonas Mattsson cited The Legend of Zelda series and Red Dead Redemption as influencing the game's level designs and environments. The developers also cited the Gothic series as a big influence. CD Project had localized and published Gothic (released in Poland in 2002) and Gothic II (in 2003) in Poland. Both games as well as Gothic 3 (released in 2006) became very popular in Poland and therefore a success for CD Project as a regional publisher of said games.

Months before its release date, the game's economy, crafting, and inventory systems were incomplete and apparently unable to meet the deadline. Senior gameplay designer Matthew Steinke thought of a remedy and drew up a system context diagram. To allocate prices, Steinke wrote a formula based on rate of damage, defence, or healing. Polynomial least squares were used to determine its efficacy, and it was found to eliminate bugs from the system and reduce loading times. Each character was given a unique personality to contrast the fetch-quest system typically used in video games. It was decided early that the writing would be witty, with metaphors and implied meanings. Early in development, dialogue for each side quest was limited to 15 lines, with writers often having to attest to the quality and necessity of the dialogue to be allowed an extension beyond that limit. Player options were written as morally ambiguous, reflecting real life and Andrzej Sapkowski's original Witcher series. Alcoholism, abuse and sexuality, depicted as normal parts of the medieval world, were incorporated into the story for authenticity. Areas of the open world were based on Poland, Amsterdam, and Scandinavia. Objects were modelled by hand.

Storylines such as Yennefer imprisoning Geralt on an island and Geralt's covert recruitment to the Wild Hunt were discarded to make the game smaller and avoid splitting it into two parts. The card game Gwent was preceded by other minigame proposals, including a drinking game, knife throwing, and ice skating. A re-enactment of the Battle of Grunwald was recorded for the sounds of battle, marching, blacksmithing, and the firing of arrows. Recording the knights' voices for post-processing, the speakers wore helmets for an authentic sound. Marcin Przybyłowicz was the game's music director and composer, with additional music contributed by Percival, a Polish folk band that plays on reconstructions of medieval instruments. They perform their own compositions as well as old Slavic melodies, which made them a good choice for what Przybyłowicz had in mind. According to Przybyłowicz, working with Percival was a challenge; he expected an academic approach before learning that most of the group were not formally trained, and much of the music was improvised. Multi-instrumentalist Robert Jaworski of the folk band Żywiołak recorded lute, Renaissance fiddle, bowed gusle, and hurdy-gurdy sections. The score was performed in Frankfurt an der Oder by the Brandenburg State Orchestra, conducted by Bernd Ruf.

== Marketing and release ==
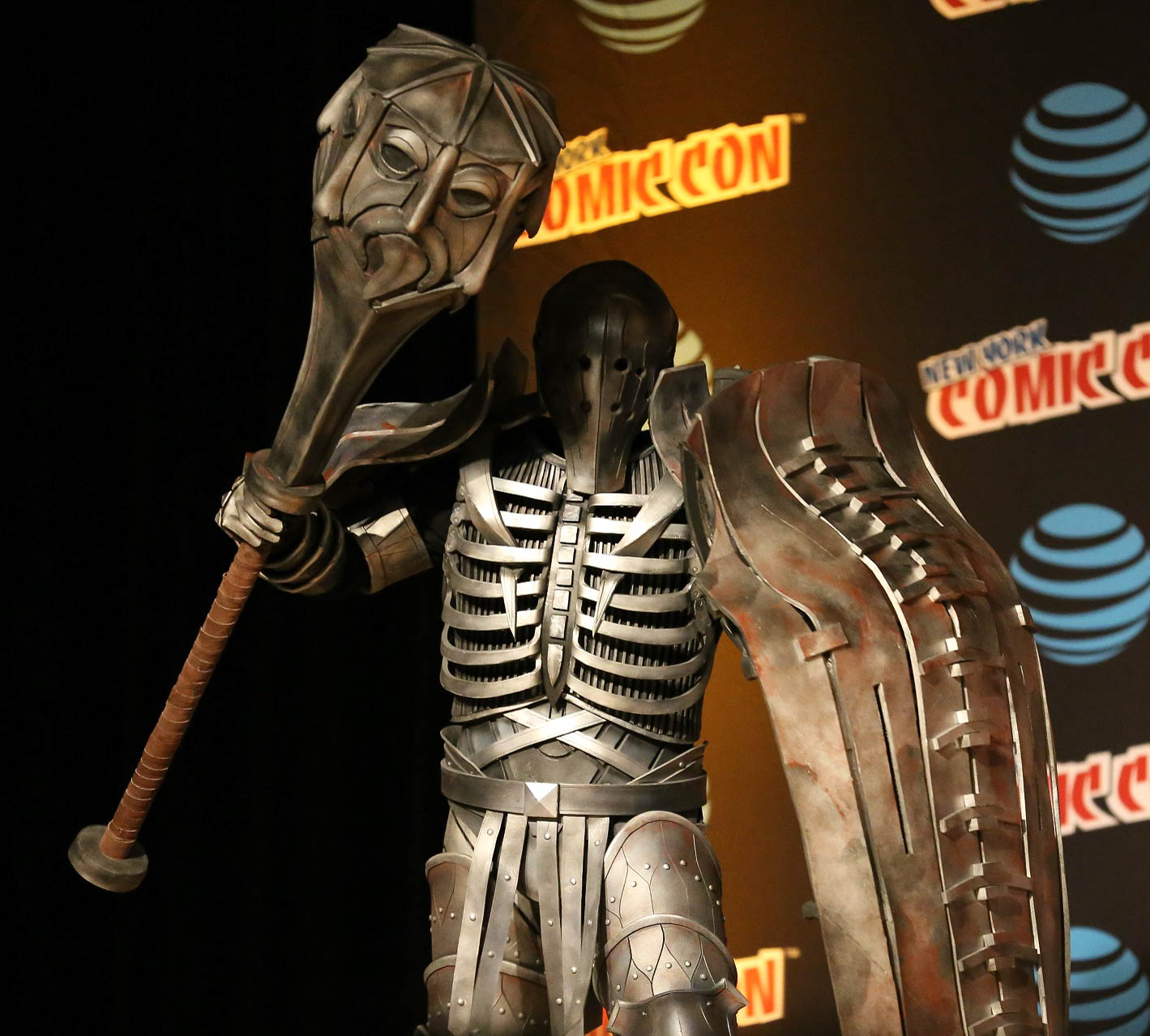
Statue of Imlerith at the 2016 New York Comic Con.

The Witcher 3: Wild Hunt was announced in 2013, then to be released for PC, PlayStation 4, and Xbox One the following year. The release date was later delayed from the third quarter of 2014 to February 2015. After missing its planned release date of 24 February, CD Projekt Red confirmed in April that the game was released to manufacturing. The Witcher 3: Wild Hunt was released worldwide on 19 May 2015. Polish Prime Minister Ewa Kopacz and President Bronisław Komorowski visited CD Projekt Red to celebrate the launch. As with the second game, Warner Bros. Interactive Entertainment and Bandai Namco Entertainment each handled physical distribution of the game in North America and Western Europe, Australia and New Zealand respectively. In addition to the standard edition, players can also purchase the "Collector's Edition", which includes the base game and items such as an artbook, a statue of Geralt fighting against a griffin, and a Witcher medallion. At E3 2019, a port for the Nintendo Switch was announced. It was developed in cooperation with Saber Interactive, and was released on October 15, 2019. The port features slight graphical downgrades to compensate for the Switch's less powerful hardware, but is otherwise identical to existing versions.

CD Projekt Red co-founder Marcin Iwiński listed three pillars that he considered integral to marketing: game quality, a "gamer-centric value proposition", and communication with fans. To achieve the second, The Witcher 3: Wild Hunt was marketed as "Skyrim in a Game of Thrones sauce". The third explained in detail the visual downgrade from earlier promotional footage to the finished product, which Iwiński thought effective. The logo was re-designed to make it less obvious that The Witcher 3: Wild Hunt was a sequel; the number three suggested a claw mark or mask to an audience unfamiliar with the series, while fans would recognise it as the mark of the Wild Hunt.

A standalone physical card game of Gwent was included with a physical copy of the Witcher 3: The Wild Hunt videogame's Xbox One Collector's Edition of the video game (Northern Realms and Nilfgaardian Empire factions) and in the "Hearts of Stone" physical expansion for PC/PS4 (Scoia'Tel and Monsters factions). A full physical edition of Gwent, Gwent: The Legendary Card Game, has been released through No Loading Games and Hachette Boardgames in 2025.

=== Downloadable content ===
The developer studied Witcher forums and websites such as Reddit to predict what players generally desired from downloadable content (DLC). A collection of 16 free DLC was released, as announced before release by the developers. They included cosmetic and additional gameplay content and the New Game Plus mode. CD Projekt Red announced two expansion packs: Hearts of Stone and Blood and Wine. Hearts of Stone was released on 13 October 2015, and Blood and Wine on 31 May 2016. Hearts of Stone follows Geralt as he contacts a mysterious entity known as the Man of Glass and an immortal man, Olgierd von Everec. The expansion was critically acclaimed. The second expansion pack, Blood and Wine, follows Geralt as he travels to Toussaint (a Nilfgaardian duchy untouched by war) to track down a mysterious beast that is terrorizing the region. It was also critically acclaimed, winning the Best RPG category at The Game Awards 2016. A "Game of the Year" edition, with the base game, both expansions and all DLC, was released on 30 August 2016. A third expansion, Songs of the Past, is set to be released for the PlayStation 5, Windows, Nintendo Switch 2, and Xbox Series X/S in 2027, developed by CD Projekt Red and Fool's Theory.

=== "Next-Gen" update ===
On 14 December 2022, the publisher released the game for the PlayStation 5 and Xbox Series X/S. This version became available as a free "Next-Gen" update for existing owners on PlayStation 4, Windows, and Xbox One, but also could be purchased separately. The "Next-Gen" version has been lauded for numerous visual enhancements made to the game, including higher resolution textures and ray-tracing.

In 2021, video game news site Kotaku had reported that the re-release would include content from mods produced by fans; "HalkHogan", creator of a mod that improves the game's textures, announced that the developer had entered talks to include content from "The Witcher 3 HD Reworked Project" in the release. CD Projekt Red confirmed to Kotaku that they had entered talks with mod creators, prompting discussion about why the company, which earned $300 million in 2020, sought out community assistance.

The updated version was originally scheduled for the second half of 2021, but was delayed to the second quarter of 2022. It was originally being developed by Saber Interactive. On 13 April 2022, CDPR announced that its in-house development team would be taking over the remaining work and that its release date would be postponed. In November, a release date of 14 December 2022 was announced for digital platforms. The game was made available for retail on 26 January 2023.

The "Next-Gen" update included new outfits and a quest inspired by the Netflix series, improved visuals, performance, and bug fixes as well as all previously released downloadable content. The re-release was published on schedule, but was criticized for introducing performance issues and bugs. Later that day, CD Projekt Red announced that they were investigating the issues and working on fixes.

=== Remastered ===
On 25 August 2026, during Gamescom 2026 - Opening Night Live, CD Projekt Red announced a remaster of the game titled The Witcher 3: Wild Hunt – Remastered, along with a new trailer and more news on the Songs of the Past expansion. The remaster was co-developed by Yigsoft, a company from Hungary founded by modders of the original game in Hungary in 2021 and provided assistance in the development of the "Next-Gen" update and the Phantom Liberty expansion for Cyberpunk 2077, in addition to contributing to the creation of REDkit, the official modding tool for CD Projekt Red games. It added multiple improvements to the game, including upgraded visuals, enhanced combat, and other quality of life improvements. It was released on 29 September 2026 for Windows, PlayStation 5, Nintendo Switch 2, and Xbox Series X/S, and is free of charge for existing owners. The Hearts of Stone and Blood and Wine expansions also became free of charge for owners of the base game on the day of the announcement.

== Reception ==
=== Critical reception ===
Reception

Aggregate scores
Aggregator	Score
Metacritic	(PC) 93/100 (PS4) 92/100 (XONE) 91/100 (NS) 85/100 (PS5) 94/100 (XSXS) 94/100
OpenCritic	95%

Review scores
Publication	Score
Destructoid	8/10
Game Informer	9.75/10
GameRevolution	3.5/5
GameSpot	10/10
GamesRadar+	4/5
GameTrailers	9.8/10
IGN	9.3/10
PC Gamer (US)	92/100
Polygon	8/10
Push Square	9/10
Video Games Chronicle	5/5
VideoGamer.com	9/10

The Witcher 3: Wild Hunt received "universal acclaim" for the PC, PlayStation 4, PlayStation 5, Xbox One, and Xbox Series X/S versions, and "generally favorable reviews" for the Switch version, according to review aggregator Metacritic. Critics agreed that it was an ambitious action role-playing game which was grand in scale, but marred by technical difficulties and a lack of innovation. GameSpot and Eurogamer gave the game their highest rating. The Witcher 3: Wild Hunt has been considered one of the greatest games of all time.

The game world received widespread praise from critics. Kimberly Wallace of Game Informer called it "immersive", and was impressed by its attention to detail. Destructoid's Chris Carter praised its size, which he found enormous and would take players hours to explore. Jonathon Leack, writing for Game Revolution, praised the game's effective use of its large world. Leack wrote that every region had quests and activities for players to try, although he thought that much was filler which extended its length. Tom Senior of GamesRadar praised the open world's variety, describing it as an "exciting realization of the Ronin fantasy". GameTrailers' Daniel Bloodworth praised the game for encouraging exploration; many quests would only become available to players after they met non-playable characters in different parts of the world. Vince Ingenito of IGN and Shaun Prescott of PC Gamer were impressed by the game's scenery and its day-night cycle, with Ingenito saying that it highlighted the game world's authenticity.

Its narrative received critical acclaim. Carter praised the cast of characters, which he called unique and interesting. He considered the narrative more involving, with players witnessing key events and making consequential choices. Wallace praised the game's dialogue and its side-quests; each was similar to a short story, and player decisions in the quests would influence the state of the world. She liked the main quest, which added more character to Geralt, and said that the romance options were a significant improvement over its predecessors. However, she was disappointed with the quality of the game's endings. Kevin Van Ord of GameSpot echoed Wallace, noting that The Witcher 3: Wild Hunt's story had more characterisation for Geralt than the previous games. He welcomed the change, since it gave players emotional connections to the in-game characters. Senior enjoyed the side-quests, calling them "a compilation of dark fantasy short stories" which overshadowed the main quests. Ingenito was disappointed with the main story, saying that there was too much padding and too many dull quests. PC Gamer's Shaun Prescott agreed, saying that the narrative would have felt rote if the side content was not engaging. Van Ord, Wallace and Brett Phipps of VideoGamer.com praised the voice acting, with Wallace calling it the series' best. Arthur Gies from Polygon criticized that some of the female characters are overly sexualized and that there are no people of color in the main game.

The game's combat had a generally positive reception. Bloodworth found Geralt more mobile and agile with the new climbing and swimming mechanic. Carter said that it was significantly streamlined and its predecessors' strategic elements removed, but appreciated its action. Wallace wrote that with a simplified alchemy system, a decent user interface and diverse difficulty settings the combat was more accessible, although she disliked the disruptive weapon-degradation system and unrefined crossbow shooting mechanic. Leack thought the system lacked complexity and criticised its lack of polish, caused by the unreliable lock-on system, camera issues and excessively-long combat animation. Senior noted that some gameplay mechanics, such as rolling and dodging, were inconsistent and made the system feel unfair. Ingenito praised the combat, describing its fluidity as a significant improvement over its predecessors.

Other gameplay aspects received mixed reviews. Van Ord praised the game's customisation and upgrade system (which offered players a sense of progression), since it hardened as the story unfolded. Ingenito called its upgrade system deep and flexible, since players have considerable freedom when customising Geralt's skills. Leack disliked the upgrade system, calling it "unexciting". Carter was disappointed with the Witcher Senses, finding it repetitive, but Senior considered them superior to objective markers — the norm for role-playing games. Prescott disliked the user interface for its clumsiness and tedium. Senior found the Gwent card game an addictive minigame.

The game was criticised for its technical issues. Carter called its climbing animations stiff, noting that some gameplay bugs would hinder player progress. According to Wallace, the game's load times were too long. Leack noted that the game had a graphic downgrade, and the actual game did not look as good as the 2013 demonstration. Senior, Phipps and Ingenito noted frame rate issues; although Ingenito thought it did not impact the gameplay, Phipps called it a persistent problem which overshadowed many of the game's achievements.

=== Sales ===
Before its release, over 1.5 million people pre-ordered the game. The Witcher 3: Wild Hunt debuted atop the UK software sales chart in its first week, when it earned 600% more than predecessor The Witcher 2: Assassins of Kings. It was the best-selling video game of the year in the UK, breaking the record held by Battlefield Hardline. It debuted atop the Japanese video-game sales charts, selling 67,385 units in its first week. Four million units of the game were sold in its first two weeks of release.

By June 2015, over 690,000 players had activated the game through GOG Galaxy. The game sold over six million units in the next six weeks, and the studio made a profit of $63.3 million in the first half of 2015. In March 2016, CD Projekt Red reported that the game had shipped nearly 10 million units worldwide. By the end of 2017, the series as a whole had sold over 33 million. By June 2019, that number had risen to over 40 million, with The Witcher 3: Wild Hunt accounting for over half of that figure.

Following the release of the first season of Netflix' television series The Witcher in December 2019, The Witcher 3: Wild Hunt had a 554% increase in sales that month compared to December 2018. By December 2019, The Witcher 3: Wild Hunt had sold over 28 million units. By April 2021, the game had sold over 30 million units, while the series as a whole had sold over 50 million. By April 2022, it had sold 40 million units. By May 2023, sales topped 50 million units. By May 2025, the game had sold over 60 million units. By May 2026, it had sold over 65 million units.

=== Awards ===
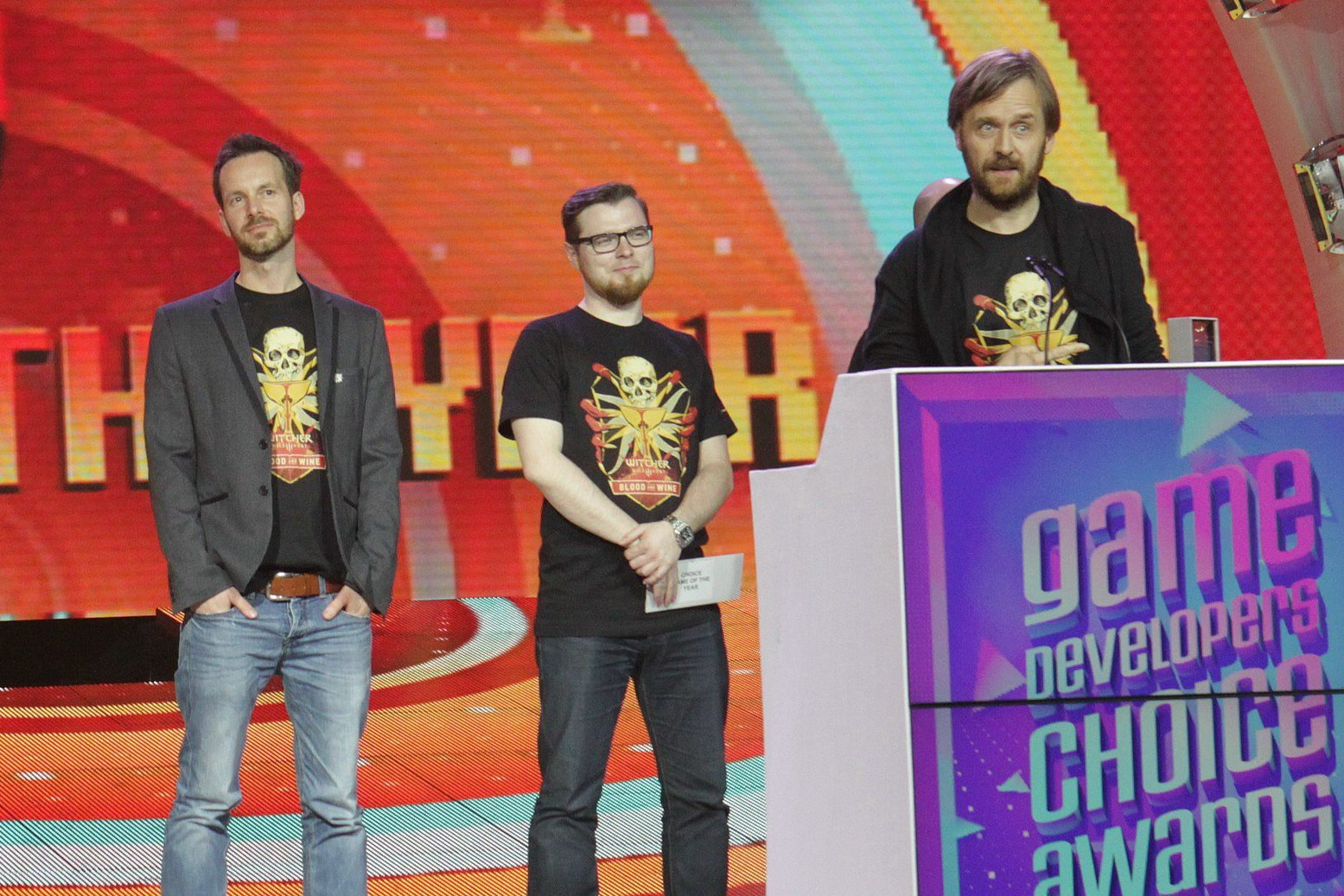
Marcin Iwiński, one of the founders of CD Projekt, accepting the Game of the Year award at the 2016 Game Developers Choice Awards

The Witcher 3: Wild Hunt received pre-release awards at E3 in 2013 and 2014. It was voted the best role-playing game at the IGN Best of E3 Awards in 2013 and 2014. It won IGN's E3 People's Choice Award in 2013 and 2014, GameSpot's E3 People's Choice Award in 2014, and the Most Wanted Award at the 31st and 32nd Golden Joystick Awards. It was the Most Anticipated Game at the Game Awards 2014 in Las Vegas. It received 260 game of the year awards and was the most awarded game of all time until 2021, when it was overtaken by The Last of Us Part II. By August 2016, it had received over 800 awards. In 2020, Gamesradar listed it as the top game of the generation.

Its accolades are from several events, including the Golden Joystick Awards, The Game Awards, D.I.C.E. Awards, Game Developers Choice Awards, SXSW Gaming Awards and the National Academy of Video Game Trade Reviewers (NAVGTR) awards. The Witcher 3 was recognized as game of the year by IGN, GameSpot, Game Informer and other gaming publications. The game received a Golden Joystick Award for Best Storytelling, Best Visual Design and Best Gaming Moment, and the Game Awards for Best Role-Playing Game and Studio of the Year for CD Projekt Red. It won Outstanding Achievement in Game Design, Outstanding Technical Achievement and Outstanding Achievement in Story at the 19th Annual D.I.C.E. Awards, and won the Game of the Year and Best Technology awards at the 16th Annual Game Developers Choice Awards. A 2023 poll conducted by GQ which surveyed a team of video game journalists across the industry ranked the title as the fifth best video game of all time.

Year	Award	Category	Result	Ref.
2013	31st Golden Joystick Awards	Most Wanted	Won	
2014	32nd Golden Joystick Awards	Most Wanted	Won	
2014	The Game Awards 2014	Most Anticipated Game	Won	
2015	33rd Golden Joystick Awards	Game of the Year	Won	
2015	33rd Golden Joystick Awards	Best Gaming Moment	Won	
2015	33rd Golden Joystick Awards	Best Storytelling	Won	
2015	33rd Golden Joystick Awards	Best Visual Design	Won	
2015	The Game Awards 2015	Game of the Year	Won	
2015	The Game Awards 2015	Best RPG	Won	
2015	The Game Awards 2015	Best Narrative	Nominated	
2015	The Game Awards 2015	Best Score/Soundtrack	Nominated	
2015	The Game Awards 2015	Best Performance (Doug Cockle as Geralt of Rivia)	Nominated	
2015	The Game Awards 2015	Best Art Direction	Nominated	
2015	Canadian Videogame Awards 2015	Fans' Choice: Best International Game	Nominated	
2016	68th Writers Guild of America Awards	Outstanding Achievement in Videogame Writing	Nominated	
2016	19th Annual D.I.C.E. Awards	Game of the Year	Nominated	
2016	19th Annual D.I.C.E. Awards	Role-Playing/Massively Multiplayer Game of the Year	Nominated	
2016	19th Annual D.I.C.E. Awards	Outstanding Achievement in Game Direction	Nominated	
2016	19th Annual D.I.C.E. Awards	Outstanding Achievement in Character (Geralt of Rivia)	Nominated	
2016	19th Annual D.I.C.E. Awards	Outstanding Achievement in Original Music Composition	Nominated	
2016	19th Annual D.I.C.E. Awards	Outstanding Achievement in Game Design	Won	
2016	19th Annual D.I.C.E. Awards	Outstanding Achievement in Story	Won	
2016	19th Annual D.I.C.E. Awards	Outstanding Technical Achievement	Won	
2016	16th Annual Game Developers Choice Awards	Game of the Year	Won	
2016	16th Annual Game Developers Choice Awards	Best Technology	Won	
2016	2016 SXSW Gaming Awards	Game of the Year	Won	
2016	2016 SXSW Gaming Awards	Excellence in Gameplay	Nominated	
2016	2016 SXSW Gaming Awards	Excellence in Art	Nominated	
2016	2016 SXSW Gaming Awards	Excellence in Technical Achievement	Won	
2016	2016 SXSW Gaming Awards	Excellence in Visual Achievement	Won	
2016	2016 SXSW Gaming Awards	Excellence in Narrative	Won	
2016	2016 SXSW Gaming Awards	Excellence in Musical Score	Nominated	
2016	2016 SXSW Gaming Awards	Most Enduring Character	Nominated	
2016	12th British Academy Games Awards	Artistic Achievement	Nominated	
2016	12th British Academy Games Awards	Audio Achievement	Nominated	
2016	12th British Academy Games Awards	Best Game	Nominated	
2016	12th British Academy Games Awards	Game Design	Nominated	
2016	12th British Academy Games Awards	Performer (Doug Cockle as Geralt of Rivia)	Nominated	
2016	12th British Academy Games Awards	Persistent Game	Nominated	
2016	12th British Academy Games Awards	Story	Nominated	
2026	44th Golden Joystick Awards	Best Remake/Remaster	Won	
2026	The Game Awards 2026	Best Ongoing Game	Pending	
2026	The Game Awards 2026	Best Community Support	Pending	
