= List of The Witcher characters =

The fictional universe of The Witcher saga was created by Polish writer Andrzej Sapkowski. Its central character is Geralt of Rivia. The following is a list of other notable characters from the series and its adaptations.

== Overview ==
Key:

- A dark grey cell indicates that the character did not appear or that the character's presence has yet to be announced.
- A ^{Y} indicates a role as a younger version of character portrayed by another actor.
- A ^{U} indicates an uncredited role.
- A ^{P} indicates a photographic role.
- A ^{C} indicates a cameo role.
- A ^{V} indicates a voice-only role.
- An ^{A} indicates an appearance through archival footage or stills.
- An ^{M} indicates the actor was part of the main cast for the season.
- A ^{G} indicates a guest role.

Character	Film	Television series								Video games			
Character	The Hexer	The Hexer	Netflix's The Witcher				The Witcher spin-offs			The Witcher	The Witcher 2	The Witcher 3: Wild Hunt	
Character	The Hexer	The Hexer	Season 1	Season 2	Season 3	Season 4	Nightmare of the Wolf	Blood Origin	Sirens of the Deep	The Witcher	The Witcher 2	The Witcher 3: Wild Hunt	
Character	2001	2002	2019	2021	2023	2025	2021	2022	2025	2007	2011	2015	
Main characters
Geralt of Rivia The Witcher	Michał Żebrowski^{M} Maciej Łagodziński^{Y}	Michał Żebrowski^{M} Maciej Łagodziński^{Y}	Henry Cavill^{M} Tristan Ruggeri^{Y}	Henry Cavill^{M}	Henry Cavill^{M}	Liam Hemsworth^{M}			Doug Cockle	Doug Cockle	Doug Cockle	Doug Cockle	Doug Cockle
Yennefer of Vengerberg	Grażyna Wolszczak	Grażyna Wolszczak	Anya Chalotra^{M}	Anya Chalotra^{M}	Anya Chalotra^{M}	Anya Chalotra^{M}			Anya Chalotra			Denise Gough	Denise Gough
Yennefer of Vengerberg	Grażyna Wolszczak	Grażyna Wolszczak	Anya Chalotra^{M}	Anya Chalotra^{M}	Anya Chalotra^{M}	Anya Chalotra^{M}			Anya Chalotra			Beata Jewiarz	Beata Jewiarz
Ciri of Cintra Lady of Time and Space	Marta Bitner	Marta Bitner	Freya Allan^{M}	Freya Allan^{M}	Freya Allan^{M}	Freya Allan^{M}						Jo Wyatt	Anna Cieślak
Ciri of Cintra Lady of Time and Space	Marta Bitner	Marta Bitner	Freya Allan^{M}	Freya Allan^{M}	Freya Allan^{M}	Freya Allan^{M}						Jagoda Skretowska^{Y}	Jagoda Skretowska^{Y}
Jaskier Dandelion Julian Alfred Pankratz	Zbigniew Zamachowski	Zbigniew Zamachowski^{M}	Joey Batey^{M}	Joey Batey^{M}	Joey Batey^{M}	Joey Batey^{M}		Joey Batey	Joey Batey	Tim Beckmann	John Schwab	John Schwab	John Schwab
Jaskier Dandelion Julian Alfred Pankratz	Zbigniew Zamachowski	Zbigniew Zamachowski^{M}	Joey Batey^{M}	Joey Batey^{M}	Joey Batey^{M}	Joey Batey^{M}		Joey Batey	Joey Batey	Jacek Kopczyński	Jacek Kopczyński	Jacek Kopczyński	Jacek Kopczyński
Vesemir	Jerzy Nowak	Jerzy Nowak	Theo James^{Y}	Kim Bodnia^{M}		Peter Mullan^{G}	Theo James David Errigo Jr.^{Y}			William Roberts		William Roberts	William Roberts
Triss Merigold of Maribor			Anna Shaffer^{M}	Anna Shaffer^{M}	Anna Shaffer^{M}	Anna Shaffer^{M}				Jules de Jongh	Jaimi Barbakoff	Jaimi Barbakoff	Jaimi Barbakoff
Triss Merigold of Maribor			Anna Shaffer^{M}	Anna Shaffer^{M}	Anna Shaffer^{M}	Anna Shaffer^{M}				Agnieszka Kunikowska	Agnieszka Kunikowska	Agnieszka Kunikowska	Agnieszka Kunikowska
Supporting characters
Duny Emperor Emhyr var Emreis	Dariusz Jakubowski	Dariusz Jakubowski	Bart Edwards^{G}	Bart Edwards^{G}	Bart Edwards^{M}	Bart Edwards^{M}						Charles Dance	Charles Dance
Mousesack Ermion	Aleksander Bednarz	Aleksander Bednarz	Adam Levy^{G}	Adam Levy^{G}								Patrick Drury	Patrick Drury
Queen Calanthe	Ewa Wiśniewska	Ewa Wiśniewska	Jodhi May^{G}	Jodhi May^{G}	Jodhi May^{G}								
Pavetta	Agata Buzek	Agata Buzek	Gaia Mondadori^{G}	Gaia Mondadori^{G}	Gaia Mondadori^{G}								
Stregobor	Olgierd Łukaszewicz	Olgierd Łukaszewicz	Lars Mikkelsen^{G}	Lars Mikkelsen^{G}	Lars Mikkelsen^{G}								
Renfri of Creyden	Kinga Ilgner	Kinga Ilgner	Emma Appleton^{G}										
Renfri of Creyden	Kinga Ilgner	Weronika Pelczyńska^{Y}	Emma Appleton^{G}										
Istredd		Bronisław Wrocławski	Royce Pierreson^{M}	Royce Pierreson^{M}	Royce Pierreson^{M}	Royce Pierreson^{M}							
Cahir Mawr Dyffryn aep Ceallach			Eamon Farren^{M}	Eamon Farren^{M}	Eamon Farren^{M}	Eamon Farren^{M}							
Tissaia de Vries			MyAnna Buring^{M}	MyAnna Buring^{M}	MyAnna Buring^{M}	MyAnna Buring^{G}							
Fringilla Vigo			Mimi Ndiweni^{M}	Mimi Ndiweni^{M}	Mimi Ndiweni^{M}	Mimi Ndiweni^{M}							Laura Rogers
Dara (Note: Dara is an original character from the 2019 Netflix television series universe)			Wilson Radjou-Pujalte^{M}	Wilson Radjou-Pujalte^{M}	Wilson Radjou-Pujalte^{M}								
Vilgefortz of Roggeveen			Mahesh Jadu^{M}	Mahesh Jadu^{M}	Mahesh Jadu^{M}	Mahesh Jadu^{M}							
Filavandrel aén Fidháil	Daniel Olbrychski	Daniel Olbrychski	Tom Canton^{G}	Tom Canton^{M}	Tom Canton^{M}								
Francesca Findabair Enid an Gleanna				Mecia Simson^{M}	Mecia Simson^{M}	Mecia Simson^{M}							
Téa	Małgorzata Zasztowt	Małgorzata Zasztowt	Adele Oni^{G}										
Alvéaenerle "Véa"	Julita Famulska	Julita Famulska	Colette Dalal Tchantcho^{G}										
Falwick	Maciej Kozłowski	Maciej Kozłowski^{M}											
Nenneke	Anna Dymna	Anna Dymna		Adjoa Andoh^{G}									
Iola	Maria Peszek	Maria Peszek											
Yarpen Zigrin	Jarosław Boberek	Jarosław Boberek	Jeremy Crawford^{G}	Jeremy Crawford^{G}	Jeremy Crawford^{G}	Jeremy Crawford^{G}							
Crach an Craite	Michał Milowicz	Michał Milowicz	Blair Kincaid^{G}		Jóhannes Haukur Jóhannesson^{G}								
Setnik	Ryszard Kotys	Ryszard Kotys											
Boholt	Marian Glinka	Marian Glinka	Steve Wall^{G}										
King Foltest		Edward Żentara	Shaun Dooley^{G}	Shaun Dooley^{G}		Shaun Dooley^{G}				Adam Bauman	Adam Bauman		
King Foltest		Edward Żentara	Uncredited Actor^{Y}	Shaun Dooley^{G}		Shaun Dooley^{G}				Philip Hurd-Wood^{U}	Antony Byrne		
Adda the White		Magdalena Górska	Jade Croot^{G}							Colleen Prendergast^{U}			
Korin		Waldemar Kownacki	Martin Berencsy^{G}										
Zoltan Chivay						Danny Woodburn^{M}				Peter Marinker	Alexander Morton	Alexander Morton	Alexander Morton
Vernon Roche											Mark Healy	Mark Healy	Mark Healy
Vernon Roche											Krzysztof Banaszyk	Krzysztof Banaszyk	Krzysztof Banaszyk
Ves											Barbara Kałużna	Barbara Kałużna	Barbara Kałużna
Ves											Laura Rogers	Laura Rogers	Laura Rogers
Síle de Tansarville											Nicola Walker	Nicola Walker	Nicola Walker
Síle de Tansarville											Anna Ulas	Anna Ulas	Anna Ulas
Philippa Eilhart				Cassie Clare^{G}	Cassie Clare^{M}	Cassie Clare^{M}						Pandora Colin	Pandora Colin
Philippa Eilhart				Cassie Clare^{G}	Cassie Clare^{M}	Cassie Clare^{M}						Elżbieta Jędrzejewska	Elżbieta Jędrzejewska
Keira Metz					Safiyya Ingar^{G}	Safiyya Ingar^{G}						Katie McGuinness	Katie McGuinness
Keira Metz					Safiyya Ingar^{G}	Safiyya Ingar^{G}						Zofia Zborowska	Zofia Zborowska
Margarita Laux-Antille					Rochelle Rose^{G}	Rochelle Rose^{G}						—N/a	—N/a
Margarita Laux-Antille					Rochelle Rose^{G}	Rochelle Rose^{G}						Agata Gawronska-Bauman	Agata Gawronska-Bauman
Assire var Anahid						Su Douglas^{G}					—N/a		
Ida Emean aep Sivney						Joelle Rae^{G}					—N/a	—N/a	—N/a
Nohorn	Wiesław Chmielinski	Wiesław Chmielinski	Packy Lee^{G}										
Arthur Tailles	Rafał Mohr	Rafał Mohr									Alec Newman	—N/a	—N/a
Nimir	Wladysław Baranski	Wladysław Baranski											
Vyr	Mariusz Jakus	Mariusz Jakus											
Civril	Grzegorz Emanuel	Grzegorz Emanuel											
Tavik	Janusz Rymkiewicz	Janusz Rymkiewicz											
Eldar de Casteberg	Henryk Talar	Henryk Talar											
Eithné	Dorota Kamińska	Dorota Kamińska	Josette Simon^{G}		Lorna Brown^{G}								
Ivo "Cykada" Mirce	Dariusz Biskupski	Dariusz Biskupski											
Clovis	Arkadiusz Janiczek	Arkadiusz Janiczek											
Gascaden	Jarosław Nowikowski	Jarosław Nowikowski											
King Hereward	Mariusz Leszczyński	Mariusz Leszczyński											
Baron Herm	Andrzej Hudziak	Andrzej Hudziak											
Haxo	Andrzej Musiał	Andrzej Musiał											
Vissegerd	Jerzy Schejbal	Jerzy Schejbal											
Bard Drogodar	Dariusz Siastacz	Dariusz Siastacz											
Niszczuka	Andrzej Bryg	Andrzej Bryg											
Yurga	Jarosław Gruda	Jarosław Gruda	Francis Magee^{G}										
Eist Tuirseach	Jerzy Piwowarczyk	Jerzy Piwowarczyk	Björn Hlynur Haraldsson^{G}										
Zlotolitka (Note: In the Netflix adaptation the character is named Zola)	Angelika Brykczyńska	Angelika Brykczyńska	Anna-Louise Plowman^{G}										
King Niedamir	Rafał Królikowski	Rafał Królikowski											

== Main characters ==
=== Geralt of Rivia ===
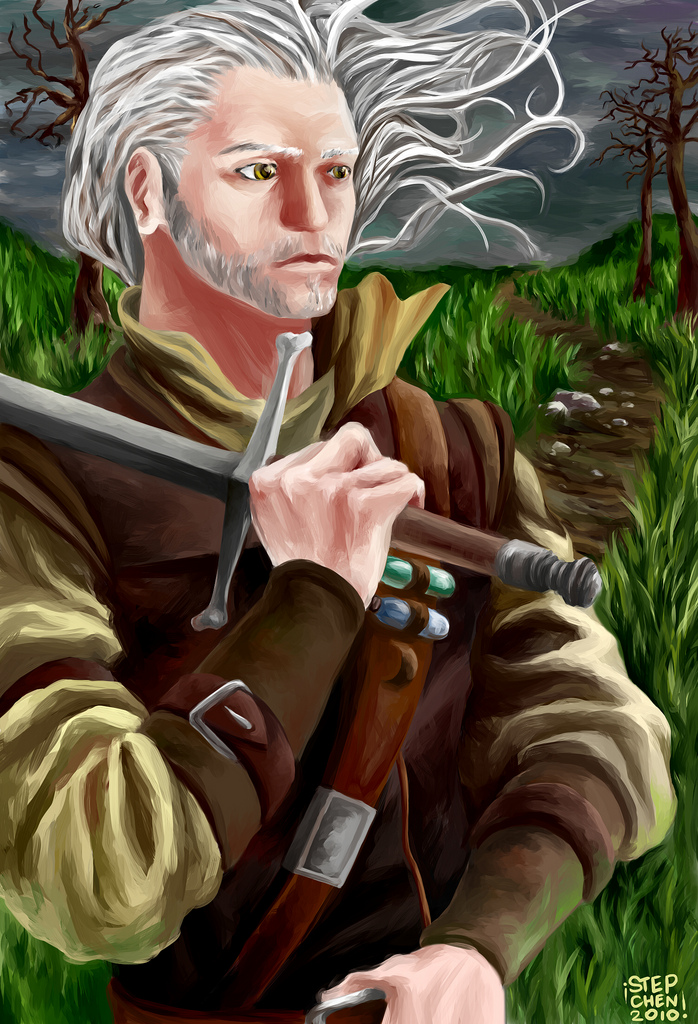
Geralt (fan art)

Geralt of Rivia, known also as White Wolf (Old Speech: Gwynnbleid) or the "Butcher of Blaviken", is a witcher and the protagonist of the Witcher series and its adaptations.

He is linked to Ciri by destiny, this being the central plot of the book series.

In the TV series, Geralt is portrayed by Henry Cavill in the first, second, and third seasons and was recast to Liam Hemsworth for season four.

=== Yennefer of Vengerberg ===
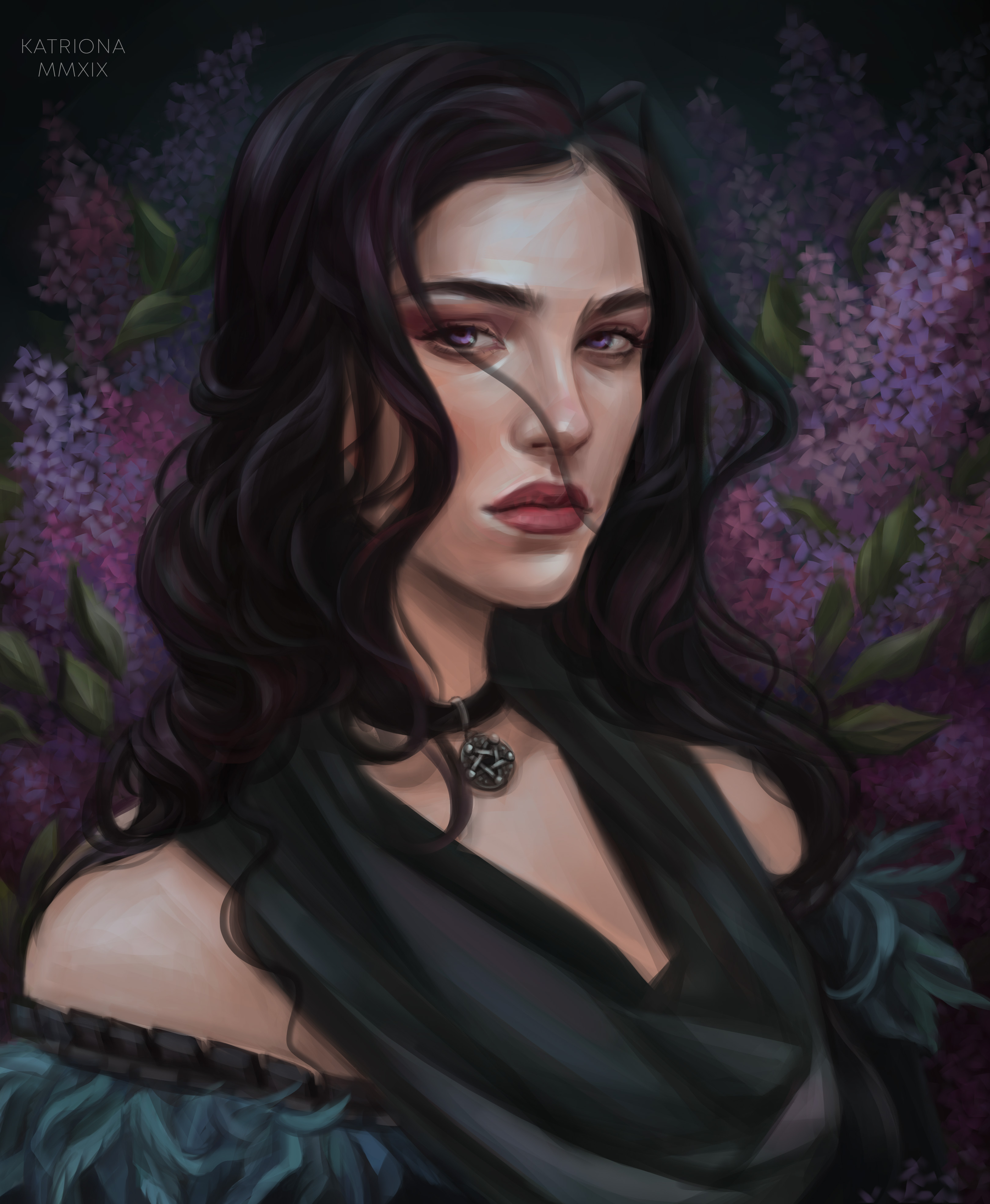
Yennefer (fan art)

Sorceress Yennefer of Vengerberg (nicknamed Yen or Yenna) first appeared in the collection of short stories The Last Wish, featuring in both "The Last Wish" short story and "The Voice of Reason" frame story. She went on to appear in numerous other Witcher stories and is one of the main characters in the Witcher saga.

Yennefer is described as possessive. She becomes one of Geralt's lovers, although their relationship is tumultuous and filled with drama. Both Geralt and Yennefer are sterile, which adds another level of tragedy to the mix. Yennefer has a hard time accepting the fact and tries various methods of restoring her fertility. Yennefer ends up becoming a motherly figure to Ciri while teaching her and watching over her while she was at Ellander.

Yennefer was born on Beltane in the year 1173. She lived in the capital city of Aedirn, Vengerberg. She is one of the most powerful mages on the continent and is surpassed by only a handful. She is the youngest member of the Council of Sorcerers, and later she became a member of the Lodge of Sorceresses. During the Battle of Sodden Hill, she was blinded by Fringilla Vigo, a Nilfgaardian sorceress. Her sight was magically restored.

Yennefer was famous for her beauty, even though during the events of The Swallow's Tower, she was 94 years old. She always dressed in black and white clothing. She used lilac and gooseberry perfumes. She had violet eyes and raven black hair. Before becoming a sorceress, she was a hunchback, but had her deformities fixed by Tissaia de Vries while being an apprentice, although Geralt is able to see the subtle clues that let him figure out the truth.

At the end of the books, Yennefer seemingly dies while trying to heal Geralt, after losing all her energy.

In the TV series, Yennefer is portrayed by Anya Chalotra.

=== Ciri of Cintra ===
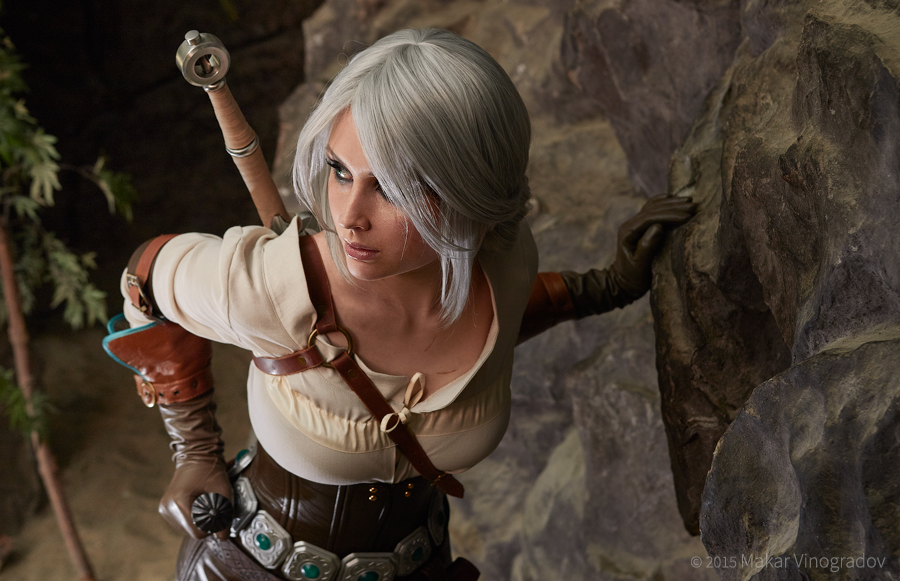
A cosplayer dressed as Ciri

Cirilla Fiona Elen Riannon, known as Ciri, Ciri of Cintra, the Lady of Time and Space, and the princess of Cintra, is one of the main characters of the Witcher saga, around whom much of the plot is centered. She is the lion cub of Cintra, daughter of Pavetta and Duny (also known as the Urcheon of Erlenwald) and granddaughter of Queen Calanthe. She is also Geralt's destiny and adopted daughter. Ciri is a descendant of Lara Dorren and possesses Elder blood, which grants her the ability to access powers that allow her to cross space and time.

Ciri was trained under the watchful eyes of Geralt, Coën, Vesemir, Lambert, Eskel, and Triss while at Kaer Morhen, becoming skilled with a sword. Later, she trained as a sorceress while living with Yennefer at Ellander. After the Thanedd coup, Ciri became separated from Geralt, created an unstable portal, and, going through it, found herself in the Korath desert. After her time in the desert, she joined a gang called the Rats, but was then captured by a bounty hunter named Leo Bonhart and forced to fight in an arena. She later escaped and fled to the world of Aen Elle. During her time with the Aen Elle, she was going to be forced to procreate with the King, although she was able to avoid this. She later escaped from that world and, after traveling through time, was reunited with Geralt and Yen. She travelled with them for a few months before their untimely deaths. However, there is some controversy surrounding this. In the book, it says Ciri took them to another world where they lived.

Her sword, named Zireael, is a 200-year-old gwyhyr, a very expensive and precious sword regarded as the best in the world, forged by the gnomes of Tir Tochair. It was given to her as a gift by Esterhazy, the armorer and swordsmith in the town of Fano.

At the end of the books, after Geralt and Yennefer's (implied, unconfirmed) deaths, Ciri finds herself in the world of Camelot, where she meets young Galahad, one of King Arthur's knights, with whom she supposedly falls in love.

In the TV series, Ciri is portrayed by Freya Allan.

=== Dandelion (Jaskier) ===
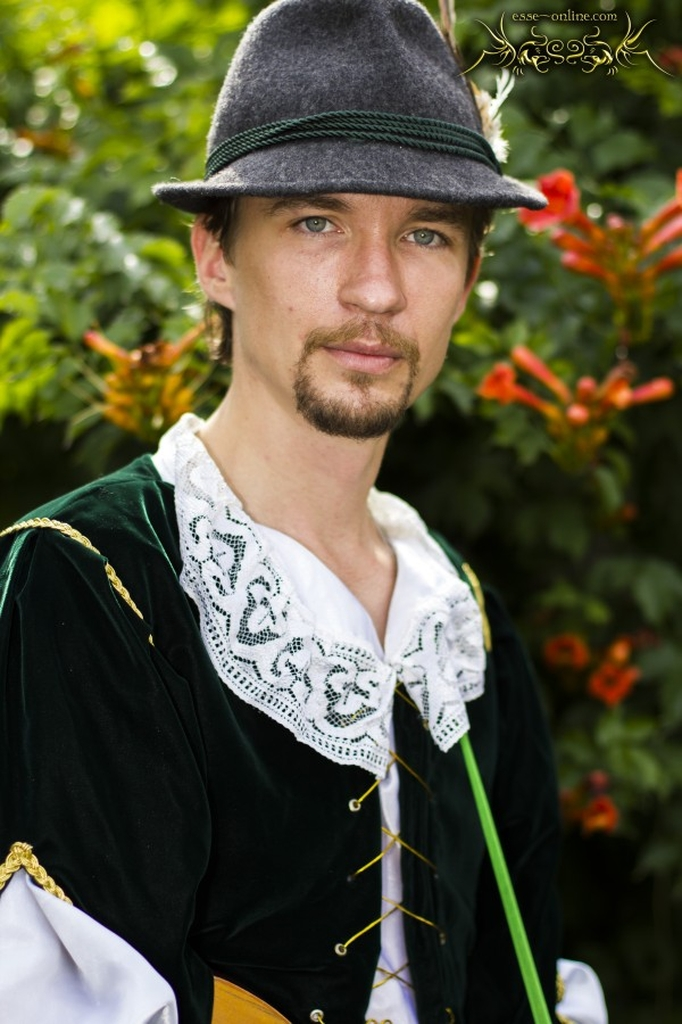
Dandelion in the Russian rock opera The Road with No Return

Julian Alfred Pankratz, Viscount of Lettenhove, commonly known as Dandelion (Polish: Jaskier), is a poet, minstrel, bard, and Geralt's best friend. The Polish word jaskier actually refers to the buttercup (Ranunculus). Some of his more famous ballads are about the relationship between Geralt and Yennefer, but none of Jaskier's ballads appear in the book. Some excerpts of these are cited from Jaskier's memoirs 50 lat poezji (50 Years of Poetry). By the time of the saga, Dandelion is around 40 years old. However, it is said that he looked like he was in his 30s ("You are almost 40, you look 30, you imagine you're 20, and you act like you're 10" as noted by Dijkstra). Also, in Chapter 3 of The Tower of the Swallow Geralt criticizes Jaskier's selection of the title 50 Years of Poetry and says that he (Jaskier) is not yet forty and that he started writing poetry only at the age of 19, inspired by the passion towards the Countess de Stael. He wears a fancy cap with a heron's feather and plays an elven lute. Dandelion accompanies Geralt in many novels and ends up joining Geralt's party while searching for Ciri, but leaves it before the assault on Stygga Castle. Dandelion makes Geralt promise he would return with Ciri to the Duchy of Toussaint, where Dandelion lives. He would later rejoin Geralt and witness his and Yennefer's deaths in the kingdom of Rivia.

In the TV series, Jaskier is portrayed by Joey Batey.

=== Vesemir ===
Vesemir is a Witcher who serves as the father figure/mentor to Geralt of Rivera.

In the TV series, Vesemir is portrayed by Kim Bodnia in season two and by Peter Mullan in season four. Theo James provided a vocal cameo of Vesemir in season one and later reprised him in The Witcher: Nightmare of the Wolf.

=== Triss Merigold ===
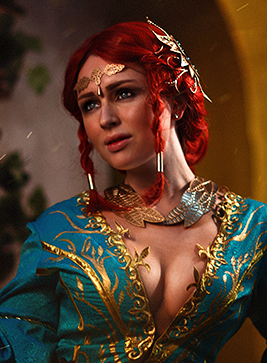
Triss Merigold (cosplay)

Triss Merigold is a sorceress and one of the Heroes of Sodden Hill in the first war, fighting Nilfgaard. She is known for her beautiful auburn hair and is a close friend of Yennefer. She took care of Ciri at Kaer Morhen for some time and felt like an older sister to her. After Thanedd, she became a member of the Lodge of Sorceresses. Triss is in love with Geralt and struggles between feelings of desire and duty.

In the TV series, Triss is portrayed by Anna Shaffer.

== Supporting characters ==
=== King Foltest ===
King Foltest is the king of Temeria in the North. In his youth, he was involved in an incestuous affair with his sister that produced a daughter, although both mother and child died in childbirth. They are buried in the family crypt beneath the family castle. However, due to the situation and the way magic works in the fantasy setting, five years later, the daughter rises as an undead monster called a striga, which kills villagers, forcing the royal family of Temeria to abandon their castle and let it fall into ruin. King Foltest forbids anyone from destroying the striga and eventually hires Geralt to lift the curse from the daughter he would dearly love to save, as he has never married and she is his only heir. Geralt is successful, and the girl returns to life as a 15-year-old. However, she is unsocialized and must be taught to speak and behave as a civilized person.

In the TV series, Foltest is portrayed by Shaun Dooley.

=== Stregobor ===
Stregobor is a powerful mage and master illusionist who is the Rector of Ban Ard where male mages train.

In the TV series, Stregobor is portrayed by Lars Mikkelsen.

=== Milva ===
Maria Barring (known as Milva) is a talented female archer who is one of the few non-dryads tolerated in Brokilon. After guiding the remains of the beaten Scoia'tael commandos during the second war, she joins Geralt's quest to find Ciri. She later reveals herself to be pregnant and struggles between choosing an abortion or keeping the child. In the end, she miscarries after being wounded during the Battle for the Bridge on the Yaruga. During the party's stay at Toussaint, she strikes up a relationship with a baron. She dies providing covering fire for the rest of the party during the assault on Stygga.

In the TV series, Milva is portrayed by Meng'er Zhang.

=== King Vizimir II ===
King Vizimir II is the ruler of Redania.

In the TV series, King Vizimir II is portrayed by Ed Burch.

=== Radovid V ===
Radovid V is the prince of Redania and the brother of King Vizimir II.

In the TV series, Radovid V is portrayed by Hugh Skinner.

=== Cahir Mawr Dyffryn aep Ceallach ===
Cahir Mawr Dyffryn aep Ceallach (known as Cahir) is an intelligence officer in the Nilfgaardian army who later joins Geralt's party. Cahir is from Vicovaro and has five siblings; he is known for the black helm he wears, which is decorated with the wings of black birds. He ends up falling in love with Ciri when he saves her during the attack on Cintra. Cahir was supposed to capture Ciri and bring her back to Emhyr, but she fled, and he was forced to return empty-handed, for which he was thrown into prison. He would have another chance to redeem himself during the coup at Thanedd, but would once again fail. He later joins Geralt's party as he wants to protect and save Ciri. Due to him being a Nilfgaardian and, more specifically, the black knight who haunted Ciri's dreams, Geralt has a hard time trusting him, but this later changes. Cahir perishes in a duel against Leo Bonhart during the assault on Stygga in an attempt to buy some time for Ciri and Angoulême.

In the TV series, Cahir is portrayed by Eamon Farren.

=== Emiel Regis Rohellec Terzieff-Godefroy ===
Emiel Regis Rohellec Terzieff-Godefroy (known as Regis) is a higher vampire and a member of Geralt's party. He was well over 400 years old by the time the books were written. Regis joins the party after rescuing Geralt and Dandelion. Due to him being a vampire, Geralt is reluctant to let him join; however, the rest of the members have an easier time with it. Regis is fond of correcting others about their knowledge of vampires and enjoys engaging in intellectual and cultural conversations with the other members of the group. Unlike other vampires, Regis does not drink blood despite his addiction to it when younger, and can withstand full daylight. During the party's stay at Toussaint, he develops a relationship with a succubus. Regis is very powerful and resistant to both physical damage and temperature; he can regenerate even if cut into pieces. Unfortunately for him, it did not help him in Stygga during the fight with Vilgefortz, who melted him into a column with a powerful spell.

In the TV series, Regis is portrayed by Laurence Fishburne.

=== Angoulême ===
Angoulême is an extroverted, fair-haired girl who bears a resemblance to Ciri. She is from a rich Cintran family that abandoned her, and to survive, she joined a bandit gang called the Nightingales during the second Nilfgaardian assault on the North. She is captured and becomes a prosecution witness during an investigation of the Nightingales that involves Geralt's party. Geralt saves her life as a condition for his cooperation, and later Angoulême joins his party in return for what he did for her. Angoulême is fond of swearing and dreams of opening up a bordello. She dies during the assault on Stygga while protecting Ciri.

=== Philippa Eilhart ===
Philippa Eilhart is King Vizimir's advisor and remains in Redania's court after his assassination, which she herself arranged. Philippa is a powerful sorceress and one of the few who possess the ability to polymorph. She is a close ally of Dijkstra and occasionally sleeps with him. She is bisexual. Eilhart is a member of the Chapter on the Conclave, the leader of the Thanedd coup, and the founder of the Lodge of Sorceresses. Philippa arranged the coup in an attempt to eliminate the pro-Nilfgaardian mages and strike first; however, her plans backfired as the conclave collapsed, leaving the North weakened. Philippa, along with the rest of the Lodge (except Yennefer), attempts to use Ciri as a political tool to create a state run by mages; however, her plans fail. It is stated in the final book that Philippa is eventually tortured and killed by witch hunters, and later became known as Saint Philippa. In the games, however, she manages to survive.

In the TV series, Philippa is portrayed by Cassie Clare.

=== Dijkstra ===
Sigismund Dijkstra is the spymaster in Vizimir's court. He considers himself to be close friends with Philippa and is in love with her. Dijkstra helps Philippa in the coup at Thanedd but becomes crippled after Geralt breaks his leg. Dijkstra is considered a tall man and does not resemble a typical spymaster. He becomes one of the key reasons why the North wins the second war against Nilfgaard, as he secures aid from Kovir, which allows him to obtain mercenaries and supplies for the Northern armies. However, due to being a commoner and not a noble, the leaders of the North look down upon him. At the end of the novels, he is forced to flee Redania and the North after Philippa tries to have him killed when she thinks that he is getting close to finding out what happened to Vizimir.

In the TV series, Dijkstra is portrayed by Graham McTavish.

=== Vilgefortz ===
Vilgefortz of Roggeveen is a member of the Chapter of the Conclave and was a very powerful sorcerer. Along with being one of the most powerful mages in the world of The Witcher, he also happens to be one of the greatest fighters. Vilgefortz displays his skills when he beats and cripples Geralt in a duel at Thanedd. Vilgefortz is not a typical mage, as he decided to become one after he was well into adulthood and was already an experienced mercenary. Also, unlike the majority of sorcerers who tend to freeze their ages when they are older, so they look distinguished, he looks like a man in his 30s and is quite handsome. He also happens to be one of the rare offspring of a mage, as most of them are sterile. During the first war with Nilfgaard, Vilgefortz proves crucial to the North's victory, as he leads the mages during the Battle of Sodden Hill. He, along with his fellow mages, is considered a hero in the North, but he switches sides and works with Emhyr in an attempt to get his hands on Ciri so he can have the elder blood from the child he planned to put in her. Vilgefortz is killed during the assault on Stygga at the hands of Geralt, though it was no easy task as he seriously wounds Yen and Geralt and (literally) melts Regis.

In the TV series, Vilgefortz is portrayed by Mahesh Jadu.

=== Leo Bonhart ===
Leo is one of the most famous bounty hunters on the continent during the events of the books. He is nearly seven feet tall and is described as ghoulish, with fish-like eyes. Bonhart is an incredibly skilled swordfighter, having easily defeated the gang of Rats. He also claims to have killed three witchers and has their medallions as proof, though Yennefer questions whether he actually defeated them in a sword duel or if he killed them through other means. Leo is hired by Stefan Skellen, Nilfgaard's imperial coroner, to kill Ciri, though he ends up capturing her and uses her as a pit fighter. Ciri escapes, and he gives chase unsuccessfully. He allies with Vilgefortz and Skellen and would kill Cahir during the assault on Stygga, but he himself is later killed in a duel by Ciri.

In the TV series, Bonhart is portrayed by Sharlto Copley.

=== Emhyr var Emreis ===
Emhyrs var Emreis is the Emperor of the Nilfgaardian Empire and Ciris's biological father who spent several years cursed as a hedgehog man. He intends to father a child of the Elder Blood with Ciri in spite of the fact that she is his daughter, although he changes his mind in the final book.

In the TV series, Emhyr is portrayed by Bart Edwards.

=== Stefan Skellen ===
Stefan Skellen is Emhyr's spymaster and fixer who in charge of searching for Ciri. Skellen is secretly working to overthrow Emhyr and eventually aligns himself with Vilgefortz and Bonhart.

In the TV series, Skellen is portrayed by James Purefoy.

=== Eredin Bréacc Glas ===
Eredin is an Aen Elle elven military commander and king of the Wild Hunt who leads a horde of ghastly riders across the sky. In The Swallow's Tower, he and Avallac'h lure Ciri to the tower, which leads to her imprisonment in the world belonging to the Aen Elle. There, the duo tries to force her to have a child with the king of the Aen Elle to harness her powers. Eredin ruins the plan by killing the king, and attacks Ciri. Ciri escapes with the help of unicorns, but not before learning that elves have massacred humans on the Aen Elle world. Eredin's Red Riders attempt to pursue Ciri along the Spiral between worlds.

=== Rience ===
Rience is a renegade mage, a dropout from Ban Ard mage school, and the main henchman of Vilgefortz. He works as a double agent, spying for (but really on) Nilfgaard. He is given the task of finding the Cintran princess Ciri. Rience likes to torture people and their pain for his pleasure. He eventually dies being drowned in Tarn Mira by Ciri.

In the TV series, Rience is portrayed by Chris Fulton in Season 2 and by Sam Woolf in Season 3.

=== Mousesack ===
Mousesack (Polish: Myszowór, 'Ermion' in The Witcher 3) is a druid from Skellige and a good friend of Geralt. He helps raise Ciri before the Slaughter of Cintra.

In the TV series, Mousesack is portrayed by Adam Levy.

=== Queen Calanthe ===
Calanthe is the queen of Cintra and Ciri's grandmother. She dies during the Slaughter of Cintra.

In the TV series, Calanthe is portrayed by Jodhi May.

=== Yarpen Zigrin ===
Yarpen Zigrin is a dwarf mercenary who aids Geralt many times, from hunting down a golden dragon to aiding him on the trail.

In the TV series, Zigrin is portrayed by Jeremy Crawford.

=== Villentretenmerth ===
Villentretenmerth is a golden dragon that can assume the form of Borch Three Jackdaws, a knight.

In the TV series, Borch Three Jackdaws is portrayed by Ron Cook who also voiced his Villentretenmerth form.

=== Ihuarraquax ===
Ihurraquax is a unicorn that Ciri first encounters in the Korath Desert.

=== Otto Dussart ===
Otto Dussart is a werewolf that Geralt once spared.

In the TV series, Otto Dussart is portrayed by Dempsey Bovell.

=== Zoltan Chivay ===
Zoltan Chivay is a dwarf veteran of the Second Nilfgaard War and a friend of Geralt.

In the video game series, Zoltan is voiced by Peter Marinker in The Witcher and Alexander Morton in The Witcher 2 and 3.

In the TV series, Zoltan is portrayed by Danny Woodburn.

=== Percival Schuttenbach ===
Percival Schuttenbach is a gnome jeweler and a companion of Zoltan Chivay.

In the TV series, Percival is portrayed by Linden Porco.
