= Geralt of Rivia =

Protagonist of The Witcher series

- The Witcher Saga character
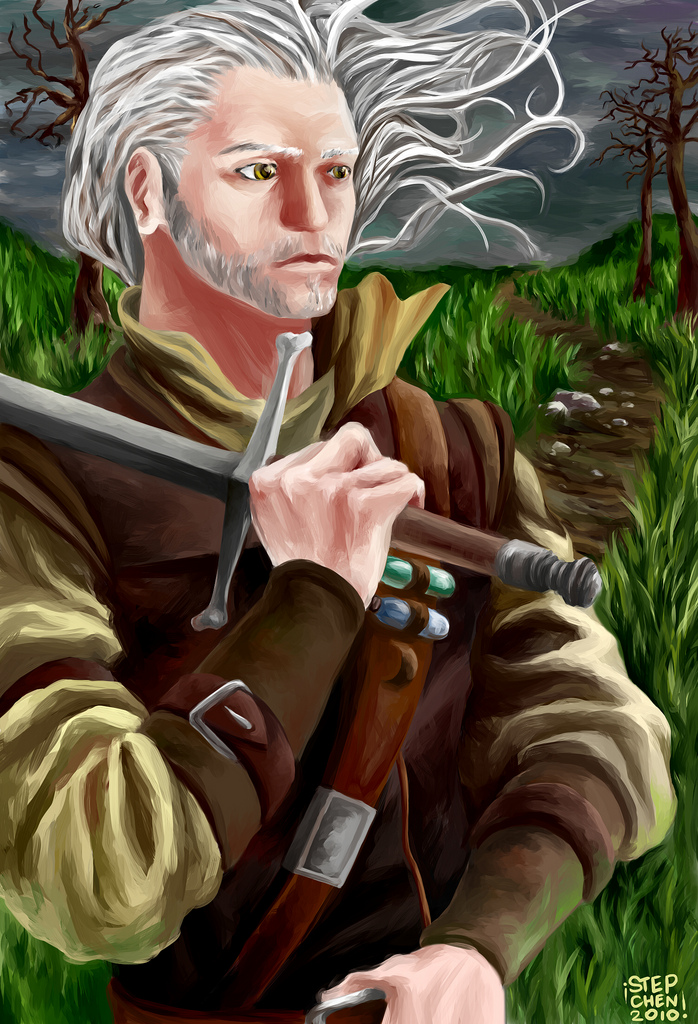
- Fan art depicting Geralt of Rivia in Andrzej Sapkowski's The Witcher
- First appearance: "The Witcher" (1986)
- Created by: Andrzej Sapkowski
- Portrayed by: Michał Żebrowski (The Hexer film and TV series); Henry Cavill (The Witcher TV series, Seasons 1–3); Tristan Ruggeri (young; The Witcher TV series, Season 1) Liam Hemsworth (The Witcher TV series, Seasons 4–5)
- Voiced by: Jacek Rozenek (video games, Polish, The Witcher TV series, Season 4); Doug Cockle (video games, English); Michał Żebrowski (The Witcher TV series, Seasons 1-3, Polish)

In-universe information
- Children: Ciri of Cintra (adoptive daughter)

Geralt of Rivia (/ˈɡɛr.əld/, GHERR-əld; Polish: Geralt z Rivii) is a fictional character and the protagonist of The Witcher series of short stories and novels by Polish author Andrzej Sapkowski. He is a magically enhanced monster-hunter known as a "witcher", who possesses supernatural abilities due to his mutations.

Geralt of Rivia is also the protagonist of CD Projekt Red's series of video games based on The Witcher. In television adaptations, he was portrayed by Michał Żebrowski in The Hexer film and television series. Henry Cavill portrays the character in the first three seasons of Netflix's The Witcher television series, with Tristan Ruggeri portraying a young Geralt in the first season, and Liam Hemsworth due to take over the role from the fourth season onward.

== Fictional biography ==
=== Novels ===
Geralt is a witcher, a mutant made for hunting and killing monsters. Shortly after being born, Geralt's mother, Visenna, gives him away to undergo training and, eventually, become a witcher at the School of the Wolf at Kaer Morhen – the stronghold of the Wolven school witchers. His mentor and father figure there was a wise man and warrior named Vesemir. Geralt survived mutations during the Trial of the Grasses, thanks to which he gains various witcher traits: high resistance to injury, poison, and diseases, as well as slowed aging. Uniquely, Geralt had an unusual tolerance for the trials and was subjected to experimental mutagens as a result. Due to this, it caused the loss of all body pigmentation, leaving him with pale skin and white hair, which is the reason why he is referred to as Gwynbleidd in the Elder speech (close to the Welsh translation "Blaidd Gwyn"), meaning "The White Wolf".

Despite his name, Geralt does not come from Rivia. Geralt received his training as a witcher in Kaer Morhen, which is located in Kaedwen; this is where he may actually be from. He added "of Rivia" to his name as he began work as a witcher, under advice from Vesemir that folk would be more trusting of him if he had a surname. Years later, he helped Queen Meve of Lyria and Rivia during an important battle, after which she knighted him, officially bestowing on him the title Geralt of Rivia.

After completing his witcher training, he receives his Wolf medallion (the symbol of Kaer Morhen) and embarks into the world on his horse called Płotka (literally, "Roach" ; he gives the same name to every horse he owns) to become a monster slayer for hire.

I looked for the words "Witcher urgently needed". And then there'd be a sacred site, a dungeon, necropolis or ruins, forest ravine or grotto hidden in the mountains, full of bones and stinking carcasses. Some creatures which lived to kill, out of hunger, for pleasure, or invoked by some sick will. A manticore, wyvern, fogler, aeschna, ilyocoris, chimera, leshy, vampire, ghoul, graveir, were-wolf, giant scorpion, striga, black annis, kikimora, vypper... so many I've killed.

— Geralt, in Andrzej Sapkowski, The Last Wish, "The Voice of Reason 4"

Even though Geralt does not believe in destiny, he unknowingly demands the unborn child of princess Pavetta and her husband Duny as a reward for his services by invoking "the Law of Surprise". The child turns out to be a girl, Cirilla, commonly known as Ciri; since then the two are linked to each other. At first, Geralt does not take her because traditionally women were not witchers. However, fate causes Geralt and Ciri to cross their paths twice, with him claiming her for a second time when he invokes the Law of Surprise on a traveling merchant he saves from monsters during a random encounter. Geralt ends up taking the girl into his care, becoming her mentor, training and loving her as his own daughter.

Following the short stories, the novels unfold as Geralt is pulled into a whirlwind of events in his attempts to protect Ciri from those who would do her harm, becoming reluctantly embroiled in the political contentions of monarchs and emperors.

In 2024 Sapkowski published a prequel, Crossroads of Ravens, which received the Janusz A. Zajdel Award for this year.

== Reception ==
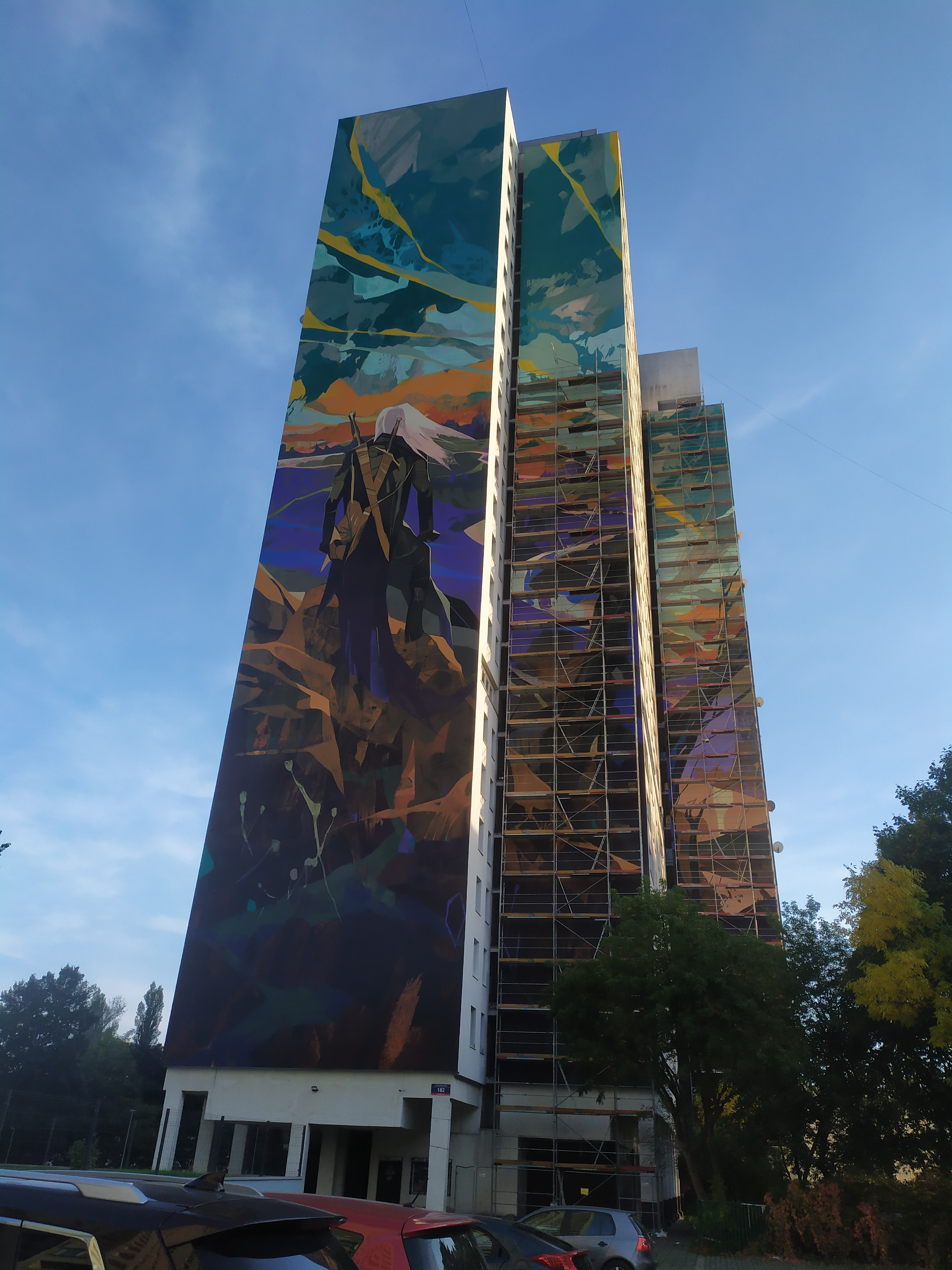
A mural of Geralt in Łódź, Poland

Péter Apor described Geralt as being emblematic of Polish popular culture's spirit of "neo-liberal anti-politics" in the 1990s. He is a professional, carrying out his duties and unwilling to become involved in the "petty quarrels" of contemporary politics. Sapkowski has stated that he personally abhors politics and considers his books to be politically neutral. Dominika Oramus (née Materska at that time) compared Geralt to Raymond Chandler's signature character Philip Marlowe. Dawid Matuszek discussed the gender and sexuality of Geralt, arguing that while Geralt has many obvious masculine characteristics, a deeper analysis also finds elements of feminine traits in his character.

In 2018, GamesRadar ranked Geralt as the 6th best hero in video game history. In 2018, he was included in Tom's Guide Top 25 Best Video Game Characters of All Time.

== In other media ==
=== Film and television ===
Michał Żebrowski portrays Geralt in the 2001 Polish film adaptation, The Hexer, and the television series of the same name that followed in 2002. Żebrowski also provides the dub voice of Cavill's Geralt in the Polish-language dub of Netflix's TV adaptation.

Henry Cavill portrays Geralt in the first three seasons of the Netflix television series The Witcher, the first season of which was released in December 2019. Sapkowski served as a creative consultant on the project. Starting with season 4, the role will be recast with Liam Hemsworth taking over from Cavill as Geralt. Tristan Ruggeri appears in flashbacks as a younger Geralt.

The character of Geralt was dubbed by the following voice actors: Michał Żebrowski (Polish), Jiří Dvořák (Czech), Dmytro Havrylov (Ukrainian), Alexander Doering (German), Pepe Vilchis (Latin Spanish), Guillermo Romero (Spanish), Adrien Antoine (French), Pawan Kalra (Hindi), Welker Gábor (Hungarian), Gianfranco Miranda (Italian), Hiroki Tōchi (Japanese), Guilherme Briggs (Brazilian Portuguese), Sergey Ponomarev (Russian), Krin Aksorndee (Thai) and Rıza Karaağaçlı (Turkish).

In The Witcher: Nightmare of the Wolf animated film, young Geralt was voiced by Harry Hissrich, while in The Witcher: Sirens of the Deep, Doug Cockle reprises the role.

=== Video games ===
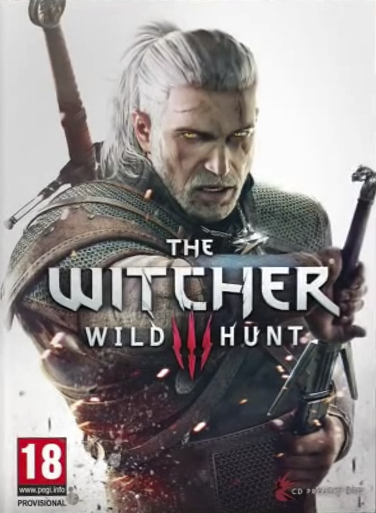
Geralt in the cover of The Witcher 3

Geralt's adventures continue in a non-canonical version by CD Projekt Red's video game trilogy (The Witcher, The Witcher 2: Assassins of Kings and The Witcher 3: Wild Hunt), where he is still alive. He is voiced by Jacek Rozenek in Polish and Doug Cockle in English.

The third installment of the trilogy, like its predecessors, follows Geralt through his final adventures. Following the events of Witcher 2, Geralt has regained his memory of the past and prepares to embark on a new journey. In the Witcher 3, Geralt is on the hunt for the only person he considers kin, Ciri. Along his journey, Geralt must face the Wild Hunt in order to protect the people he cares about. In the new open world, Geralt has the opportunity to complete quests that are both part of the main story and side quests. He will also interact with old friends Dandelion and Vesemir along with potential lovers Triss Merigold and Yennefer.

Sapkowski stated that the games are a work of art of their own and that they cannot be considered either an "alternative version", or a sequel, "because this can only be told by Geralt's creator. A certain Andrzej Sapkowski."

Geralt, voiced by Cockle, appeared as a guest character in the 2018 game Soulcalibur VI. He also appeared in special content for Monster Hunter: World and Daemon X Machina.

Geralt appeared as the collaboration outfit of Fortnite Battle Royale's Chapter 4 Season 1 Battle Pass. Geralt and other Witcher characters appeared as cosmetics in Dead by Daylight with Doug Cockle reprising his role as Geralt.

== Commemoration ==
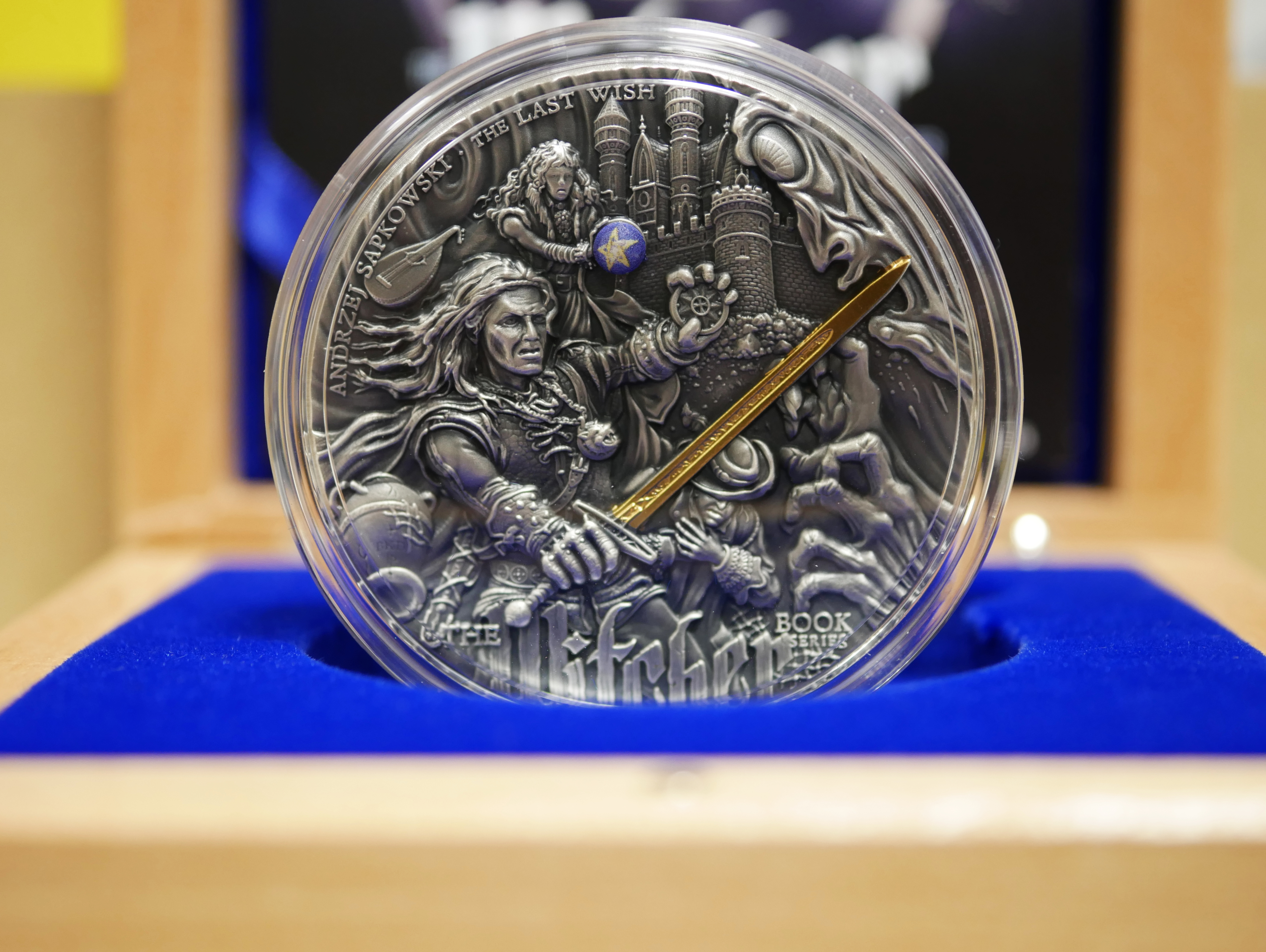
Geralt of Rivia depicted on a collector coin

In 2018, one of the city squares in Sapkowski's hometown of Łódź was named in honour of Geralt of Rivia to celebrate the author's 70th birthday.

In 2019, the Mint of Gdańsk produced a series of collector coins in collaboration with Andrzej Sapkowski. The first coin in the series was based thematically on the short story collection The Last Wish and features Geralt of Rivia. The issue of each subsequent coin corresponds to successive volumes of stories from the Witcher Saga.

In October 2021, a mural of Geralt was painted on the side of a high-rise building in Łódź. Spanning three 70-meter-high walls on a 26-floor apartment block and covering almost 2,000 sq/m, it is the largest mural in Poland and one of the largest in the world. The mural has been inspired by an 1818 painting Wanderer above the Sea of Fog by German Romantic-era artist Caspar David Friedrich.

== See also ==
- List of characters in The Witcher series
