= D (Cyberpunk: Edgerunners) =

Cyperpunk 2077 character

- Cyberpunk 2077 character
- D in Cyberpunk: Edgerunners 2
- First appearance: "Last Chance for a Slow Dance" (2026)
- Created by: Bartosz Sztybor
- Voiced by: EN: Nazeeh Tarsha; JA: Koki Uchiyama

D, short for David (Japanese: デイビッド, Hepburn: Deibiddo), is a character in the 2026 anime series Cyberpunk: Edgerunners 2, which was created by Bartosz Sztybor and co-produced by the Polish video-game company CD Projekt Red and the Japanese animation studio Trigger. D is a nomadic netrunner who seeks revenge by hunting the killer of his clan, Snake Nation. In the beginning of the series, D meets the twelve-year-old cinephile Roman Carax, who learns of D's trauma, which was caused by the destruction of his clan, and accompanies him on his quest for revenge.

According to the character's creator, writer and showrunner Bartosz Sztybor, D is defined by his trauma and his ability to change in the aftermath, while drawing parallels with the previous protagonist, David Martinez from Cyberpunk: Edgerunners. D is voiced by Koki Uchiyama in Japanese and Nazeeh Tarsha in English.

In response to D's character, critics often drew comparisons with the Naruto manga character Sasuke Uchiha, who is based on their similar designs and backstories. Critics praised D's character arc, which changes him from a traumatized man to a more-hopeful individual, especially when interacting with Capri. He was also likened to David due to their heroic parallels and connected storylines.

== Role in Cyberpunk: Edgerunners 2 ==
D is a nomadic netrunner who seeks revenge on the man who orchestrated the massacre of his clan, Snake Nation. The young Roman accompanies D on his quest and suggests to D they find the missing Arasaka datashard. D meets a consciousness named Capri to possess him, and manipulate D's body and mind. While possessed, D remotely hacks Night City's electronic system and wreaks havoc. Capri reveals she is an engram designed as a substitute for a true artificial intelligence. D persuades Capri to help him get revenge for Snake Nation's deaths. With Capri's help, D breaks into Arasaka Tower, hacks its database, and assaults an employee named Kitano. They are unable to find out who is behind the attack. D reinstalls the datashard but Capri becomes completely silent and inert.

In return for the datashard, D asks Roman to edit a video of his declaration of war against Arasaka. D uses the datashard to broadcast his declaration to Night City, and wages a campaign of terror against Arasaka while Roman films his exploits. Fellow Snake Nation survivor Omi reprimands D for losing himself to his desire for revenge. Concerned about D's deteriorating mental state, Roman brings Kyoko to diagnose him. Kyoko accidentally divulges her knowledge about the Arasaka list and flees when D attacks her. Arasaka intelligence officer Kate Miller contacts D and arranges to trade information about him in exchange for her safety. Kate says D was to be used for Project Capricorn after they discovered he was compatible, until the scheduled extraction mission to the Snake Nation camp devolved into a massacre of the clan. She also tells him the man who ordered the mission, Tanaka, was already killed by David Martinez' crew.

When Capri takes full control of Talia's body, D confronts both without a desire for revenge. He fights with Talia and Capri for possession of the datashard, and retrieves it, reinstalling Capri in himself and becoming able to coexist with her. Knowing Arasaka and Militech have discovered Capri's existence and want her for themselves, D leaves Roman behind to stage a last stand against the two megacorps, which culminates in his apparent death.

== Creation ==
Cyberpunk: Edgerunners 2 writer and showrunner Bartosz Sztybor (left) created the character of D. Nazeeh Tarsha voices him in the English dub of the series.

Cyberpunk: Edgerunners 2 director Kai Ikarashi originated both D and Capri early in development. Initially, Capri was conceived of as a woman whose consciousness was digitized following her death. According to creator Bartosz Sztybor, D was intended to parallel the protagonist of Cyberpunk: Edgerunners, David Martinez. Both characters are seeking revenge against Arasaka but approach their desire for revenge in different manners. As several characters were references to the action role-playing game Cyberpunk 2077, the arcs of Capri was meant to be a parallel to the one between the protagonist V and the supporting characters Johnny Silverhand, as well as David and Lucy.

David Martinez's sacrifice for his love interest Lucy at the end of the first Cyberpunk: Edgerunners anime split the fanbase according to Sztybor. He enjoyed this reaction and thus wanted to bring more parallels with D's character in regards to whether or not he can fullfil his revenge. The reveal David's crew has already killed Tanaka, the man responsible for the massacre of Snake Nation, was conceived as a way to leave D feeling empty and dissatisfied during the show's final act. Multiple nightmare sequences were included with a focus on his trauma, and they featured a distinct visual style involving abstract shapes and bold colors.

D's character design was heavily influenced by the bold shapes featured in anime from the 1990s. Ikarashi took a special interest in D during production, and focused on his intense emotional experiences. A core principle during pre-production was that the main protagonists, with the exception of Roman, should have a "curse" of some kind, and those curses should be reflected in their designs. D was designed as one of the more-handsome characters because he would experience deep emotional trauma during his revenge arc, and Ikarashi wanted to ensure he would remain good-looking regardless of his mental state. Sztybor aimed to give D a more-ambiguous and more-hopeful ending than David in the first Cyberpunk Edgerunner anime.

In Japanese, D is voiced by Koki Uchiyama. In the English dub of the series, D is voiced by Nazeeh Tarsha.

== Critical reception ==
D's initial reveal led to comparisons with the Naruto character Sasuke Uchiha. Joshua Fox of ScreenRant liked the idea D may have been inspired by Sasuke, noting how he grows across the narrative while dealing with a similar revenge quest, and also said both characters have similarly memorable designs. Cristian Villa of Areajugones also drew parallels between D and Sasuke, seeing potential for D to become one of the series' best characters based on the similarities and possible appeal to Naruto fans. Korean website This is Games said that multiple viewers were also anticipating that D would start a romantic relationship with D. The staff of Trigger was surprised by and responded by saying that Edgerunners 2 was aiming to use more noir tropes rather than romance.

Following the series' release, Ben Williams, writing for Radio Times, noted parallels between D and previous Cyberpunk protagonist David Martinez; he noted te connection between their story arcs because D falls deeper into madness after realizing David has already killed Tanaka. Forbes writer Paul Tassi originally believed Thalia would be the story's hero but he later saw D as the more-suitable hero based on his corruption across the story with a fan he compared with Harley Quinn. Williams concluded D might be the best part of the series. Bradley Russell from GamesRadar said David and D's final actions mirror each other; D is determined to protect his friends rather than seek revenge, in a similar manner to David' self-sacrifice for Lucy. AnimeCorner writer Marko Jovanovic enjoyed the way Roman films D across the story, turning him into a symbol, but lamented Roman is still with D during D's transition into a more villainous character. Jovanovic praised D's overall revenge arc, and liked that Capri gives D an excuse for more screen time than he otherwise would have had, as well as his conflicts with Talia. GameWatch praised D's character arc involving his quest of revenge, and the suitability of his voice actor Koki Uchiyama's talent of individuals dealing with a dark side.

Critics also praised D's sacrifice at the end of the series. Crystal Bell from Mashable said despite the ambiguous nature of D's death, it is still a hopeful moment. D's relationship with Capri allows him to rediscover his own innocent self that disappeared after becoming been traumatized by the massacre of Snake Nation. Yahoo in particular praised how D embraces Capri during the series' finale as a it gives him a sense of freedom and atonement, showing a smile in his final moments after committing several crimes as a result of quest for redemption. Nevertheless, the nature of D's and Capri's deaths remains ambiguous. During D's final fight in the series, the anime staff used the song "In Love With Myself" by Kalman Chodakiewitz as the theme. Jovanic said the choice of song for such a climatic scene makes D's final stand more emotional.
