= Cyberpunk: Edgerunners 2 =

2026 anime series

- Promotional poster

Japanese name
- Kanji: サイバーパンク: エッジランナーズ2
Transcriptions
- Revised Hepburn: Saibāpanku Ejjirannāzu Tsu
- Genre: Cyberpunk
- Created by: Bartosz Sztybor
- Based on: Cyberpunk 2077 by CD Projekt Red
- Screenplay by: Bartosz Sztybor; Masahiko Otsuka
- Story by: Bartosz Sztybor
- Directed by: Kai Ikarashi
- Voices of: Momoka Terasawa; Akari Kitō; Kentaro Tone; Koki Uchiyama
- Opening theme: "10:15 Saturday Night"; by the Cure
- Ending theme: "Watson"; by Petite Meller
- Composer: Tsuneo Imahori
- Countries of origin: Poland; Japan
- Original languages: Japanese; English
- No. of episodes: 10

Production
- Executive producers: Saya Elder; Bartosz Sztybor; Satoru Honma; Yoshiki Usa
- Producers: Tetsuya Seya; Jan Rosner
- Cinematography: Yuichiro Tozawa
- Editor: Masato Yoshitake
- Running time: 24–28 minutes
- Production companies: CD Projekt Red; Trigger

Original release
- Network: Netflix
- Release: October 20, 2026

Related
- Cyberpunk: Edgerunners

Cyberpunk: Edgerunners 2 (Japanese: サイバーパンク: エッジランナーズ2, Hepburn: Saibāpanku Ejjirannāzu Tsu) is an original net animation (ONA) miniseries created by Bartosz Sztybor. It was co-produced by the Polish video game company CD Projekt Red and the Japanese animation studio Trigger, and premiered on Netflix on October 20, 2026. Set in the Cyberpunk universe created by Mike Pondsmith, it is a standalone sequel to Cyberpunk: Edgerunners and tie-in to the video game Cyberpunk 2077. The anime takes place in 2078 and primarily follows Roman Carax, a young aspiring filmmaker who documents and becomes entangled in the lives of several individuals trying to survive and determine who they are in the dystopian Night City.

Cyberpunk: Edgerunners 2 was released on Netflix on October 20, 2026 to generally positive reviews, and quickly became one of the most-viewed anime on the platform. Critics praised the branching narrative, character development, and production values.

== Premise ==
Cyberpunk: Edgerunners 2 is set in 2078 and takes place in Night City, a self-reliant metropolis in California that suffers from obsessive cybernetic body modification, rampant gang violence, and corporate warfare exacerbated by a corrupt municipal government. The city is divided into six main districts controlled by several megacorporations, most notably Arasaka and Militech. However, after suffering attacks carried out by David Martinez and V, (Note: As depicted in Cyberpunk: Edgerunners and Cyberpunk 2077) Arasaka begins losing its influence over the city, which Chinese weapons manufacturer and rival megacorporation Kang Tao exploits to seize profits and valuable technology.

The story primarily follows Roman Carax, a young amateur filmmaker who takes videos of day-to-day life in Night City. In his pursuit of earning income from his films, he becomes unwittingly involved with several of Night City's citizens, most notably D, a vengeful netrunner searching for his nomad clan's killer; Talia Yang, a rebellious teenage girl running away from her corporate upbringing in Kang Tao; and Weak Kingsley, a man rediscovering his purpose following his fall from grace as a respected edgerunner—a cybernetically-enhanced mercenary outlaw also known as a cyberpunk. A datashard containing an unpredictable power becomes an item of interest among Night City's criminals and corporations, which poses a threat to everyone involved.

== Characters ==
Roman Carax (ロマン・カラックス, Roman Karakkusu)
Voiced by: Momoka Terasawa (Japanese); Valeria Rodriguez (English)
A twelve-year-old cinephile obsessed with documenting the truth and unfiltered stories of Night City, often recording them and being exposed to various brutalities. He has a distaste towards braindances and prefers the appeal of traditional film.
Talia Yang (タリア・ヤン, Taria Yan)
Voiced by: Akari Kitō (Japanese); Kimoy Lee (English)
The rebellious daughter of Avida. She ran away from Kang Tao to settle in with Maelstrom, a street gang obsessed with applying extensive cyberware to their bodies. She also began taking cyberware to combat her terminal illness.
Weak "King" Kingsley (ウィーク・キングズリー, Uīku Kinguzurī)
Voiced by: Kentaro Tone (Japanese); Clancy Brown (English)
A veteran edgerunner living in the shadow of his former glory. He was once known as King and had previously been in a romantic relationship with Avida.
D / David (デイビッド, Deibiddo)
Voiced by: Koki Uchiyama (Japanese); Nazeeh Tarsha (English)
A nomadic netrunner seeking revenge through hunting the killer of his Snake Nation clan.
Capri (カプリ, Kapuri)
Voiced by: Aoi Koga (Japanese); Brittany Lauda (English)
A rogue engram created by Arasaka for Project Capricorn.
Avida Yang (アヴィダ・ヤン, Avida Yan)
Voiced by: Akemi Okamura (Japanese); Cesili Williams (English)
Talia's mother and King's former lover who once worked as a jazz singer and corporate insider. She is now affiliated with Kang Tao and married to Kiril, while being worried for Talia's criminal lifestyle.
Kiril Yang (キリル・ヤン, Kiriru Yan)
Voiced by: Yasunori Matsumoto (Japanese); Daniel Wu (English)
A high-ranking Kang Tao executive with a cold and composed demeanor. He is Talia's father and the husband of Avida.
Kyoko (キョウコ, Kyouko)
Voiced by: Wasabi Mizuta (Japanese); E. G. Daily (English)
A medtech and a former researcher of Arasaka. She also led development of Project Capricorn.
Omi (オミ)
Voiced by: Ami Maeshima (Japanese); Analesa Fisher (English)
D's old friend and a surviving member of the Snake Nation clan.
Yupi (ユピ)
Voiced by: Yūko Natsuyoshi (Japanese); Cat Protano (English)
A wealthy girl who is a fan of D's campaign of terrorism against Arasaka and becomes his main benefactor.
Sal Bigelow (サル・ビゲロウ, Saru Bigerou)
Voiced by: Takashi Matsuyama (Japanese); Bernardo de Paula (English)
A supplier of braindance, an advanced type of immersive media that has since replaced traditional film. He owns Sal Bigelow's Braindance Paradise and first appeared in the comic tie-in Cyberpunk 2077: Big City Dreams.
Jessie (ジェシー, Jeshī)
Voiced by: Miho Okasaki (Japanese); Giselle Fernandez (English)
A braindance engineer who works at Sal's shop.
Kitano (キタノ)
Voiced by: Nobuo Tobita (Japanese); Tohoru Masamune (English)
An employee and researcher of Arasaka who views loyalty as a valuable and indispensable asset.
Richard (リチャード, Richādo)
Voiced by: Naoya Uchida (Japanese); Frank Todaro (English)
An executive affiliated with Kang Tao and Kiril's superior.
Meshuga (メシュガ)
Voiced by: Shūhei Sakaguchi (Japanese); Daniel Bonjour (English)
A netrunner and member of King's crew.
Miguel (ミゲル, Migeru)
Voiced by: Kazuma Miki (Japanese); Kevin Andrew Rivera (English)
A cybernetic specialist and member of King's crew.
Emily (エミリー, Emirī)
Voiced by: Mirei Takebe (Japanese); Wendee Lee (English)
A soldier-for-hire and member of King's crew.
Hideyoshi Oshima (ヒデヨシ・オオシマ, Hideyoshi Ōshima)
Voiced by: Hideo Kojima
A noteworthy Japanese braindance producer. Kojima reprises his cameo role from Cyberpunk 2077.

== Production and release ==
Bartosz Sztybor returned as writer and executive producer.

In October 2022, after the release of Cyberpunk: Edgerunners, CD Projekt Red expressed a possible second season would be "something completely different" rather than a direct continuation. Netflix later released a short teaser for a new tie-in with Cyberpunk 2077 in September 2024, following rumors about the possible sequel and CD Projekt Red signaling plans for more animated tie-ins.

CD Projekt Red confirmed in July 2025 that a standalone sequel series, Cyberpunk: Edgerunners 2, was in development, with most of the original creative team returning. Kai Ikarashi directs the miniseries at Trigger, with Bartosz Stybor serving as writer, producer, and showrunner, Ichigo Kanno as a character designer, and Masahiko Otsuka returning as scriptwriter. Sztybor shared that he pitched the sequel series to Trigger as reminiscent of 90s films like Pulp Fiction and Léon: The Professional, with Ikarashi adding the team based the character designs on 90s comics. Sztybor also revealed that he enlisted Ikarashi as the director after being impressed with his work on Edgerunners' sixth episode "Girl on Fire". D was created to be similar to the previous Cyberpunk protagonist David Martinez and also show a contrast between the creation of the two anime. Both characters are cyborgs who are hunted by revenge and each deal with it in a different fashion. Nevertheless, Sztybor claimed it was an appropriate ending for the first David based on how chaotic the first anime could have ended instead. All the characters except Roman, were given a "curse" and then considered how to translate that element into their appearance. Since the plot involved bullying him from the beginning, they designed him to be handsome with the intention that "if you're going to bully him, he has to be good-looking." Roman was originally given a more neutral appearance which led to multiple redesigns. Talia was inspired by feline animals and is an homage to 1990s heroines. Meanwhile, Kingsley was found as a weird character by the staff due to rare inclusion of middle aged men in anime and thus hoped he would become popular.

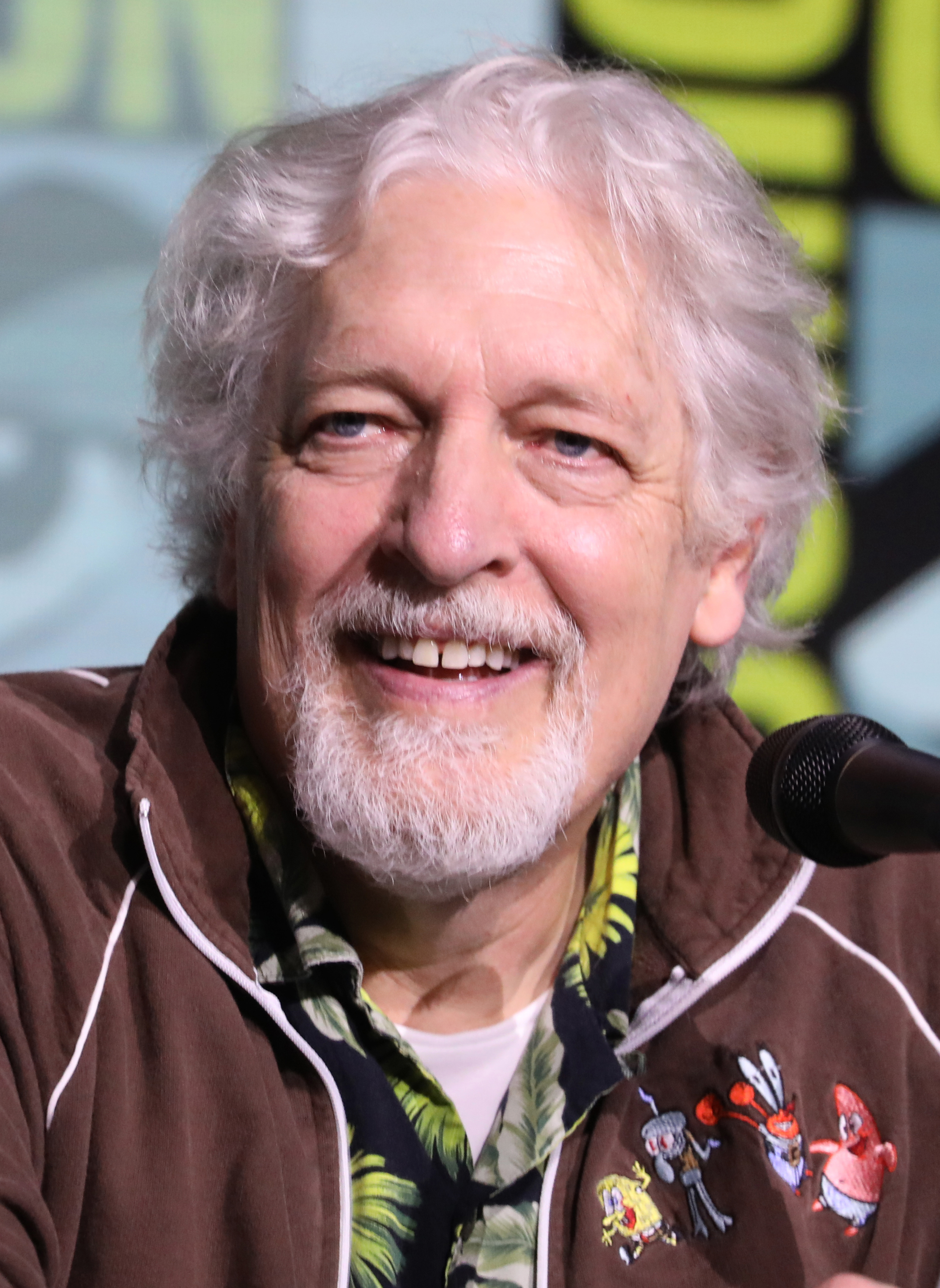
Several voice actors, such as Nazeeh Tarsha and Clancy Brown, joined the cast as D and Weak "King" Kingsley, respectively.

Tsuneo Imahori, best known for his work on Trigun, composed the original score. According to Ikarashi, Imahori's compositions helped propel the imagery of the project rather than simply serve as a supplementary medium. President of Studio Trigger Yoshiki Usa said the anime is meant to prioritize its noir tropes rather than romance. Talia was given multiple designs. D's character stands out for the pride in his family which the staff want to heavily explore in the anime and surprise fans with the type of ending they are giving it. When it came to Roman, Sztybor was against giving Roman a backstory to explore as an "artistic choice"; Roman was written as an audience surrogate whose family relationships would heavily change the way the series is perceived. Sztybor believes Roman's appeal is that is he an innocent child who meets several flawed characters. In designing D and Talia, Ikarashi cited 1990s anime character design elements like "air intakes" and "air vents" as influences. Sztybor aimed to give D a more ambiguous and more hopeful ending than David in the first Cyberpunk Edgerunners anime.

The series was released on October 20, 2026, on Netflix. The opening theme is "10:15 Saturday Night" by the Cure, while the ending theme is "Watson" by Petite Meller. The opening storyboard was handled by Hiroyuki Imaishi, the director of the previous anime, Cyberpunk Edgerunners, and the key animation was done by Igarashi, Yoh Yoshinari, Akira Amemiya, and Sushio. CD Projekt Red offered the director complete freedom in choosing the music, and director Igarashi himself personally selected an artist he felt would suit the style of the series.

== Episodes ==
No.	Title	Storyboarded by	Directed by	Screenplay by	Story by	Original release date
1	"Last Chance for a Slow Dance"	Kai Ikarashi	Akira Furukawa	Masahiko Otsuka	Bartosz Sztybor	October 20, 2026
In 2078, veteran edgerunner Weak "King" Kingsley leads a botched heist to steal a datashard from an Arasaka facility. King succumbs to a cyberpsychosis-induced rampage, forcing MaxTac to incapacitate him, before being evacuated by Trauma Team. Amateur filmmaker Roman Carax captures the rampage on film and sells it to braindance dealer Sal, who appraises it for a paltry sum. Sal reminds Roman that traditional film has fallen out of style, though he offers to sell a rare 35mm camera in exchange for footage of the Maelstrom gang. King regains consciousness to find that his medical bills have bankrupted him, his implants were forcibly downgraded to prevent another cyberpsychotic episode, and his old crew has abandoned him. Roman sneaks into Maelstrom territory and films Talia Yang, only to be caught for a forced cyberware implant while Talia takes his camera. He is saved by the netrunner D, who obtains the location of former Maelstrom member Helio. King contemplates committing suicide when he is suddenly contacted by his ex-lover and Talia's mother, Avida Yang. Elsewhere, Talia is abducted by Kang Tao soldiers.
2	"Give Me Another Day"	Naoto Uchida	Naoto Uchida	Masahiko Otsuka	Bartosz Sztybor	October 20, 2026
King meets with Avida, who claims Talia is his daughter and wants him to convince her to leave Maelstrom. Roman accompanies D in his raid of Helio's hideout, where D interrogates him about the massacre of his Snake Nation camp. Helio surmises the job was arranged by Arasaka. At the hospital, Avida admits she enlisted Kang Tao to capture Talia and install a GPS tracker in her. Talia flees both Kang Tao and King, though King manages to hack her tracker for his own use. With no leads to follow, Roman suggests to D that they find the missing Arasaka datashard and use it as a bargaining chip to get the information he needs. D and Roman attempt to break into a building housing the datashard but are repelled by its defenses. Talia returns Roman's camera and proposes he record her latest implant surgery. However, D asks Roman to accompany him in seizing the datashard again the next day, forcing Roman to cancel his hangout with Talia. King tracks Talia to Maelstrom's stronghold, where he is held captive.
3	"0+2=1"	Kai Ikarashi	Kodai Nakano	Masahiko Otsuka	Bartosz Sztybor	October 20, 2026
Talia is forced to sever ties with Maelstrom after they threaten King. Now socially isolated, Talia suffers a nervous breakdown and shows early symptoms of cyberpsychosis, worrying King. Meanwhile, Arasaka scientist Kyoko, who is revealed to have stolen the datashard during King's heist, lures D and Roman deeper into the building to use them as test subjects. D finds the datashard at Kyoko's lab and impulsively installs it, causing a consciousness named Capri to possess him. With his body and mind being manipulated by Capri, D remotely hacks Night City's electronic system and wreaks havoc, stunning Roman. King arranges Talia to be sent to the hospital, as he privately warns Avida of Talia's cyberpsychosis. Roman calls Talia to apologize for being absent at her surgery, while Capri tries to seize full control of D's body but fails.
4	"Someone That I Used to Know"	Nobutoshi Ogura	Yuki Kawano	Masahiko Otsuka	Bartosz Sztybor	October 20, 2026
D wakes up at Roman's home with no memory of his frenzy, and Roman worriedly suggests he remove the datashard. Capri reveals that she is an engram designed as a substitute for a true artificial intelligence, adding she is only effective when installed in a suitable human host. D coerces Capri into helping him and Roman get revenge for the Snake Nation's deaths. With Capri's help, they break into Arasaka Tower and hack its database, beating up an employee named Kitano in the process. They are unable to find out who is behind the attack, though they discover a list that includes D, Talia, and the late David Martinez. Avida's husband Kiril tries to suppress knowledge of Talia's condition and is warned by his superior to find the datashard for Kang Tao. King invites Talia to lunch to talk, revealing he knows she installs cyberware to compensate for a degenerative neural disease. Angered, Talia invites Roman who brings D with him. Sensing that Talia is a more compatible host, Capri forces D to install her datashard inside Talia.
5	"Fades (Pass the Distance)"	Nobuhide Kariya	Nobuhide Kariya	Masahiko Otsuka	Bartosz Sztybor	October 20, 2026
Talia, under Capri's influence, breaks down and begins lashing out at everything around her. King subdues her long enough for Roman to remove the datashard. D flees with the datashard while Talia is evacuated by Trauma Team. D reinstalls the datashard but Capri becomes completely silent and inert, causing him to become obsessed with getting Capri to speak again. At the hospital, Avida is informed of Talia's shortened lifespan due to her accelerating neural degeneration. King asks Roman to retrieve the datashard for analysis. D tries to tap into the datashard's power without success. Roman eventually tracks D down on the outskirts of the city. D refuses to hand over the datashard as they are attacked by Tyger Claws hired by a vengeful Kitano. D regains the datashard's power after pleading with Capri and brutally murders Kitano and the Tyger Claws, with Roman filming it.
6	"Everything Hate"	Sae Otani	Sae Otani	Masahiko Otsuka	Bartosz Sztybor	October 20, 2026
D asks Roman to edit a video of his declaration of war against Arasaka in return for the datashard. King contacts his netrunner Meshuga for ways to save Talia. Meshuga suggests using Arasaka's Soulkiller technology, which the corporation used in an attempt to transfer a person's digitized soul into another body, though he advises on the project's instability. D uses the datashard to broadcast his declaration all across Night City, and wages a campaign of rebellion and anarchy against Arasaka while Roman films his exploits. They are then approached by Yupi, a fan willing to contribute her wealth to their cause after sharing her hatred of Arasaka. D's crusade influences several delinquents to join him thanks to Yupi's funding, and Sal offers to distribute Roman's videos of D which are the most popular he's ever seen. Roman grows increasingly uneasy with D's endless obsession with revenge when he is contacted by Kyoko posing as an anonymous fan. King suggests to Avida that Kiril is their best lead on Soulkiller, while Kiril recognizes the presence of "Capricorn" in Roman's videos. At the hospital, Capri makes contact with Talia.
7	"To the Depths with You"	Naoto Uchida	Hinako Takagi	Masahiko Otsuka	Bartosz Sztybor	October 20, 2026
Kyoko recalls developing Capri as part of Arasaka's Project Capricorn to create supersoldiers. However, the inability to find suitable hosts led to Arasaka shutting down the project. Capri reveals she implanted her consciousness within Talia's mind and has managed to reverse her neural degeneration. Capri goads Talia to retrieve the datashard to fully restore her capabilities. Still unable to find answers, D escalates his acts of terrorism until he is confronted by fellow Snake Nation survivor Omi, who reprimands him for losing himself in his obsession for revenge. Roman privately meets with Omi, who recounts the events of the massacre and reveals D's real name is David. Talia then invites Roman to watch a movie, and Capri notes they can use him to get close to D. Avida secretly downloads all of Kiril's data on Soulkiller and discovers Kang Tao has their own copy following a backdoor deal with Arasaka. She and King decide to steal Kang Tao's Soulkiller to save Talia, unaware that Kiril is secretly monitoring them.
8	"Serce"	Sho Oi	Yuki Kawano	Masahiko Otsuka	Bartosz Sztybor	October 20, 2026
Concerned about D's deteriorating mental state, Roman brings Kyoko to diagnose him. Kyoko accidentally divulges her knowledge about the Arasaka list and flees when D attacks her, straining the friendship between D and Roman. D is then contacted by Arasaka intelligence officer Kate Miller, who arranges to trade information about him in exchange for her safety. Kate explains that D was to be used for Project Capricorn upon seeing his compatability, until the scheduled extraction mission to the Snake Nation camp devolved into a massacre of the clan. She also points out that the man who ordered the mission, Tanaka, was already killed by David Martinez's crew. (Note: As depicted in the Cyberpunk: Edgerunnners episode "Girl on Fire") Blaming himself for the massacre and with Yupi enabling him, a despondent D kills Kate and leads a massive riot. Kyoko proposes to Kang Tao on helping to secure Capri for them. She uses the datashard's failsafe to subdue D, while Kang Tao soldiers kill Yupi and the rioters. King and Avida attempt to break into Kang Tao's Soulkiller facility but are forced to leave after Kiril ambushes them. Avida, who was mortally wounded in the shootout, asks King to protect Talia before dying, devastating him.
9	"Strictly Reserved for You"	Youhei Tsuchiya	Youhei Tsuchiya	Masahiko Otsuka	Bartosz Sztybor	October 20, 2026
Kang Tao removes the datashard from D and leaves him for dead, though Omi rescues and helps him recuperate. Talia grows distraught at the discovery of Avida's death from King. Kyoko is frustrated to learn that Capri is not in the datashard, but after gleaning information from Roman, both she and Kiril realize Capri split herself into Talia. Kiril and Kang Tao kidnap Talia and beat down King, with Kiril revealing that Avida lied about Talia being King's daughter. At Kang Tao's headquarters, Kyoko inserts the datashard into Talia to complete Capri's installation, fulfilling Project Capricorn's goal. Before Talia's personality is overwritten, she requests that Kiril be killed as revenge for Avida. Capri takes full control of Talia's body and begins publicly broadcasting her pursuit and torture of Kiril. Seeing this, Roman, D, King, and Kyoko all begin to converge on their location.
10	"Then Everyone Went Home"	Kai Ikarashi	Kai Ikarashi, Kodai Nakano, & Akira Furukawa	Masahiko Otsuka	Bartosz Sztybor	October 20, 2026
Capri continues pursuing Kiril, with King and D giving chase. Roman and Omi follow D, as Kyoko lends her help after hearing D only aims to see Capri again. Kang Tao expends their resources to eliminate Capri, culminating in a full-scale airstrike. Learning this, Kyoko sacrifices herself to trigger an EMP and thwart the airstrike, killing Kiril in the resulting destruction. D retrieves the datashard following a brief fight with Talia, reinstalling Capri back in himself and accepting to coexist with her. A dying Kyoko warns D that Arasaka and Militech have scrambled teams to collect Capri for their own ends, prompting D to make a last stand against the corporations that ends with both him and Capri presumably dying. In the aftermath, Talia's condition regresses. After having all of her cyberware removed, she decides to leave Night City with King and bids farewell to Roman, encouraging him to keep filming and promising they will reunite one day to watch his films. Roman, King, and Talia resolve to continue living and keep pushing forward.

== Reception ==
=== Popularity ===
The series debuted at number 3 on Netflix's weekly ranking of non-English language shows, garnering 4.6 million views during the tracking period from October 19 to 25, 2026. Screen Rant said that viewers were divided due to the different animation style to the first Edgerunners series and that it still was a critical success on its own, garnering a 80% score on the review aggregator website Rotten Tomatoes. CD Projekt Red hosted a free premiere livestream of the first episode on Twitch, receiving a total of 18.7K concurrent viewers at its peak across all channels. It was the official channel's most popular stream of 2026.

=== Critical response ===
Rafael Motamayor of IGN noted the show's different approach to storytelling compared to Edgerunners, as it followed the connected storylines of multiple characters rather than focusing on anyone in particular, and felt the overall story arc was satisfying. He opined this lended itself well to a bigger focus on worldbuilding than the first series, but criticized its effect on the characters, as much of the character development was "treated as a mystery to be slowly unraveled". However, he felt that the final act came across as a "satisfying" conclusion to a sprawling storyline. In contrast, Gizmodo's Isaiah Colbert felt that, despite its "wildly" ambitious nature, the show still fell far short of the bar set by Edgerunners. He praised the ideas behind its ambitious and expansive story, but ultimately felt it was simply too ambitious to create a coherent whole. He felt that it had too many story threads to keep together to create a coherent storyline, and that the pacing felt overwhelming and unfocused, although it was able to draw a satisfying ending out of them.

Writing for Mashable, Crystal Bell felt the show's emotional impact was "astounding", and managed to achieve that in a far different manner than the first series. She stated that the ensemble cast gave rise to a story "less about any one person's journey and more about the ways people influence one another," and that it resulted in a drastically different overall tone than Edgerunners. She felt that the series as a whole found a different way to explore the themes that were at the heart of Edgerunners, and that it helped the show to stand apart from its predecessor rather than simply retell the same story. Bell said that despite the ambiguous nature behind D's death, his last moments are a major character for the crimes he has committed across the anime made it more hopeful. D's relationship with Capri allows him to rediscover his own innocent self that disappeared from his life as a result of being traumatized by the deaths of his Snake clan members and how the aftermath crosses with Roman's quest as the revenger was touched by his. Talia's arc was also called a parallel to D's as she tries to find her freedom at the cost of her fate becoming dark. GAME Watch acclaimed D's character arc as he undergoes a startling transformation. In the midst of this, D constantly confronts Capri that changes his personality and how far his revenge quest changes him and how this will affect his relationships.

The production values were often the subject of praise. Colbert praised the voice acting and visual asthetics. AnimeCorner writer Marko Jovanovic praised the production values for illustrating D's trauma in his dreams as well as the inclusion of the insert theme song "In Love With Myself" by Kalman Chodakiewitz for increasing the emotional value D's death scene has. GAME Watch said Koki Uchiyama's performance as D helped further give appeal to the character as Uchiyama is skilled at voicing characters who have a dark aura. Meanwhile, Clancy Brown's performance as Weak was found as one favorites by GizModo. Giz Modo also appreciated the two main theme songs, claiming no viewer would skip them. Motamayor also praised the "dazzling" visual design, noting the constant shifts between art styles to reflect characters' mental states, and especially called attention to Roman's insistence on documenting the events of the show with an old camera, giving much of it a "moody and gritty" feel that matched the story's violent tone. Mashable called particular attention to how much of the show was set during the day, providing a backdrop of everyday life that contrasted against the violent events of the story.

=== Accolades ===
Year	Ceremony	Category	nominee	Result	Ref.
2026	The Game Awards 2026	Best Adaptation	Cyberpunk: Edgerunners 2	Pending	
