= List of Ghost in the Shell: SAC 2045 episodes =

Episode list of Ghost in the Shell: SAC 2045

Ghost in the Shell: SAC 2045
- Season 2045
- Native name
- Kanji: 攻殻機動隊 SAC_2045
- Revised Hepburn: Kōkaku Kidōtai: SAC_2045
- No. of episodes: 24

Release
- Original network: Netflix
- Original release: April 23, 2020 – May 23, 2022

Ghost in the Shell: SAC 2045 is a Japanese ONA anime series based on the manga of the same name written and illustrated by Masamune Shirow. On April 7, 2017, Kodansha and Production I.G announced that Kenji Kamiyama and Shinji Aramaki would be co-directing a new Kōkaku Kidōtai anime production. On December 7, 2018, it was reported by Netflix that they had acquired the worldwide streaming rights to the series and that it would premiere on April 23, 2020. The series is in 3DCG and Sola Digital Arts collaborated with Production I.G on the project. Ilya Kuvshinov handled character designs. An English dub was not available until May 3 due to the COVID-19 pandemic causing production delays for its recording. It was stated that the series would have two seasons of 12 episodes each, with the second set released on May 23, 2022.

== Series overview ==
Series overview
Season	Episodes	Originally released
1	12	April 23, 2020
2	12	May 23, 2022

== Episode list ==
=== Season 1 (2020) ===
No. overall	No. in season	Title	Written by	Storyboarded by	Original release date
1	1	"NO NOISE NO LIFE - Sustainable War"; Transliteration: "Nō Noizu Nō Raifu / Jizoku Kanō Sensō" (Japanese: NO NOISE NO LIFE / 持続可能戦争)	Kenji Kamiyama	Kenji Kamiyama	April 23, 2020
The Major meets up with Batou, Saito, Ishikawa, and new recruit Standard (who Batou nicknames "Clown") on the war-torn roads of Palm Springs as they try to find the person supplying local bandits with high-powered weapons. Meanwhile, a newly-divorced Togusa has returned to police work in Japan when Aramaki calls for his help with a new investigation. Back in Palm Springs, the Major's group meets up with a confidential informant who claims that the belligerents are getting weapons from a "Good 1%er" but doesn't know who that is, when they suddenly walk into a robotic guard dog.
2	2	"AT YOUR OWN RISK - Divided by a Wall"; Transliteration: "Atto Yua Ōn Risuku / Kabe ga Hedateru mono" (Japanese: AT YOUR OWN RISK / 壁が隔てるもの)	Kenji Kamiyama	Shinji Aramaki	April 23, 2020
The belligerents in Palm Springs take heavy losses but shoot their way through the Major's group using a high-tech APC and drone with Hellfire missiles. The Major manages to down the drone while her team disables the APC, but the supposedly downed drone fires a missile at a mansion in the distance, destroying it. Meanwhile, in Japan, Aramaki tells Togusa of the new Prime Minister's plan to revive Section 9.
3	3	"MAVERICK - Missing In Action"; Transliteration: "Mabarikku / Sakusen Kōdōchū Yukue Fumei" (Japanese: MAVERICK / 作戦行動中行方不明)	Ryō Higaki	Gorō Taniguchi, Kenji Kamiyama	April 23, 2020
The Major's GHOST squad is apprehended by a US Delta Force cyborg squad. An American agent calling himself John Smith hires GHOST for a rescue mission, and has them perform a variety of VR training exercises, while secretly planning to have them killed afterwards. Meanwhile, Togusa tries to contact the old Section members, and he follows the trail to California, eventually meeting with one of the Major's Tachikoma.
4	4	"SACRIFICIAL PAWN - Emissary from the Divide"; Transliteration: "Sakurifisharu Pōn / Bunkai Yori no Shisha" (Japanese: SACRIFICIAL PAWN / 分界よりの使者)	Kurasumi Sunayama	Takayuki Hamana	April 23, 2020
Togusa accidentally helps John Smith confirm GHOST's identities while being warned not to dig any further. The Major's Tachikoma ask Togusa to help repair their damaged comrade. Aramaki finds out the NSA is using GHOST, but can't recover them through his contacts, forcing him to ask the Prime Minister to intervene. GHOST is dropped into action near Beverly Hills, where they realize their target is a robotics entrepreneur named Patrick Huge, and that the mission is not a rescue but an abduction.
5	5	"PATRICK HUGE - Gift from God"; Transliteration: "Patorikku Hyūji / Kami kara no Okurimono" (Japanese: PATRICK HUGE / 神からの贈り物)	Ryō Higaki	Shinji Itadaki, Shinji Aramaki	April 23, 2020
The Major's GHOST squad infiltrates the home of Patrick Huge but is unable to apprehend him, as he inexplicably dodges all their gunfire and most of their attacks. After fighting through Huge's security robots, the team fights Huge himself, equipped with an armored suit. The team manages to disable the suit and the Major tries to dive into Huge's cyberbrain, then orders Saito to shoot Huge in the head before she loses herself. As John Smith and Delta Force operatives plan to kill everyone there, John is ordered to stand down by the President as Aramaki appears to escort Section 9 back home.
6	6	"DISCLOSURE - Quantized Gospel"; Transliteration: "Disukurōjā / Ryōshika Sareta Fukuin" (Japanese: DISCLOSURE / 量子化された福音)	Harumi Doki	Tensai Okamura	April 23, 2020
John Smith confirms that Patrick Huge was the "Good 1%er" supplying the bandits with weapons, then escorts the GHOST squad to a secret government facility where he is holding Gary Harts, a retired US Army Master Sergeant and the first known "Posthuman" who almost single-handedly launched a nuclear missile at Moscow until he was rendered inert by a lucky shot to the head. However, the supposedly brain-dead Gary uses coded messages to perform a buffer overflow attack on the facility's emergency systems, taking control of the security robots. The Major orders Batou to kill Gary before he can escape his confinement.
7	7	"PIE IN THE SKY - First Bank Robbery"; Transliteration: "Pai in zā Sukai / Hajimete no Ginkō Gōtō" (Japanese: PIE IN THE SKY / はじめての銀行強盗)	Harumi Doki	Norihiro Naganuma	April 23, 2020
Batou heads to a bank in Fukuoka to deposit his earnings from his work with GHOST, but suddenly finds himself embroiled in a bank robbery concocted by a few senior citizens who lost their retirement funds in the Simultaneous Global Default. After listening to their stories, Batou decides to help them by depositing his funds at the bank, then using his account to short-sell a cryptocurrency using the branch manager's terminal before the SAT storm the building to rescue them. The seniors split their funds, the branch manager gets arrested for the cryptocurrency's crash, and Batou reunites with Section 9.
8	8	"ASSEMBLE - What Came About as a Result of Togusa's Death"; Transliteration: "Asenburu / Togusa no Shi ni Yotte Motarasareru Jishō" (Japanese: ASSEMBLE / トグサの死によってもたらされる事象)	Daisuke Ōhigashi, Kenji Kamiyama	Michio Fukuda, Shinji Aramaki	April 23, 2020
Section 9 meets with Japanese PM Tate and John Smith, who informs the group there are 14 known Posthumans around the globe (including the two killed earlier) and three of them are in Japan, but there is no footage of them after they transformed. Aramaki offers to let each member decide if they want to work with Section 9 on this new case. The Major tasks Togusa with rooting out the mole in Tate's office. After Togusa roots out the identity of the group spying on Tate, Section 9 gets their requested budget and collectively decides to take on the Posthuman case.
9	9	"IDENTITY THEFT - The Lonely Struggle"; Transliteration: "Aidentitī Sefuto / Hitorikiri no Tōsō" (Japanese: IDENTITY THEFT / 一人きりの闘争)	Dai Satō, Kenji Kamiyama	Tensai Okamura	April 23, 2020
Sanji Yaguchi, a boxer turned Posthuman, is spotted in Fukuoka killing a bureaucrat with his fist alone. Purin compiles data suggesting that Sanji has been serially murdering immigrants and refugees linked to Tokyo reconstruction projects. Tate's father-in-law, who runs the company profiting from the reconstruction, is soon killed in a similar manner. Tate decides to lure Sanji out by making himself the bait. The Major and Batou work together to take down Sanji. The Major wonders why Sanji didn't immediately attack Tate, as John Smith takes Sanji into his custody.
10	10	"NET PEOPLE - What Led to the Hate Mob"; Transliteration: "Netto Pīpuru / Enjō ni Itaru Riyū" (Japanese: NET PEOPLE / 炎上に至る理由)	Kurasumi Sunayama	Masayuki Miyaji	April 23, 2020
Purin is on the case of a mid-manager who died at an airport when 3 million hackers were somehow directed to attack his cyberbrain at the same time. She tracks down a suspect named Koji, who leads her to a master hacker called the "Nameless King." The King tells Purin about their program "Think Pol," used to enact mob justice on a chosen target remotely, when the Major finds out the King is a highschool student named Uotori. Uotori tells the Major that someone else from his middle school wrote the original program, but he spun off Think Pol to "democratize" it. Suddenly, the program chooses Tate as its next target, forcing Section 9 to spring into action and save him.
11	11	"EDGELORD - Revolution of the 14-Year-Olds"; Transliteration: "Ejjirōdo / 14-sai Kakumei" (Japanese: EDGELORD / 14歳革命)	Harumi Doki, Kenji Kamiyama	Tensai Okamura	April 23, 2020
The Major and Togusa begin investigating the original Think Pol developer, a Posthuman boy named Takashi Shimamura, and visit his old home to interview his mother. In the past, Takashi developed Think Pol and successfully used it to kill a teacher suspected of abusing a female classmate and leading to her death. After the Major and Togusa leave, Takashi's mother finds Takashi somehow left his favorite blanket on the desk with a letter to her.
12	12	"NOSTALGIA - All Will Become N."; Transliteration: "Nosutarujā / Subete ga N ni naru." (Japanese: NOSTALGIA / 全てがNになる。)	Daisuke Ōhigashi, Kenji Kamiyama	Sōichi Masui	April 23, 2020
While analyzing code written by Takashi, Togusa stumbles over a program meant to awaken forgotten memories. Togusa and Batou decide to follow their last lead to an old, abandoned village in Kyoto, where Takashi briefly stayed with his uncle. Upon arriving in the village, Togusa begins seeing some of Takashi's older memories: meeting a JSDF Ranger, reading a translated copy of George Orwell's 1984, and witnessing a gunfight where a stray bullet took the life of his cousin Yuzu. At the end, the memory of Takashi offers Togusa a spot on a truck. Batou suddenly loses sight of Togusa as the Tachikomas wave goodbye to him.

=== Season 2 (2022) ===
No. overall	No. in season	Title	Written by	Storyboarded by	Original release date
13	1	"DOMINO EFFECT / Silly Kukushkin"; Transliteration: "Domino Efekuto / o Bakana Kukūshikin" (Japanese: DOMINO EFFECT / お馬鹿なククーシキン)	Ryō Higaki	Tensai Okamura	May 23, 2022
Section 9 hears of a Russian cyberbrain engineer named Kukushkin claiming to have knowledge about the Posthumans' code while seeking asylum in India. Kukushkin is poisoned with polonium by a Russian assassin before the group can save him, but the autopsy shows the corpse was a robotic body double. The Major tasks Batou and Purin with finding the real Kukushkin. As the two search his room, Purin deduces that Kukushkin transferred his consciousness into an assistant bot, but is unaware of a Posthuman woman named Suzuka Mizukane looking over her shoulder. The Major hunts down Suzuka before she can leave with Kukushkin but loses her in the crowd. As the Major, Purin, Batou, and Paz leave with Kukushkin, they are attacked by the Russian assassin, and after defeating him, notice Suzuka speeding towards them armed with heavy weaponry.
14	2	"CLOSE CALL / I've Awoken"; Transliteration: "Kurōsu Kōru / Kakusei shi Chaimashita" (Japanese: CLOSE CALL / 覚醒しちゃいました)	Ryō Higaki	Tensai Okamura	May 23, 2022
Section 9 fights off both Suzuka and a couple of American special combat cyborgs on the bridge as they attempt to capture Kukushkin for their own reasons. Purin uses a trio of Tachikomas to chase down Suzuka but is forced to stop her pursuit when Suzuka wirelessly hijacks a passenger jet and aims it right at Purin, forcing her to hack into the jet herself and steer it away. As Section 9 carries Kukushkin away, Aramaki meets with Tate to discuss a traitor in his office who leaked information about Kukushkin to John Smith.
15	3	"FACTOR / 1A84"	Ryō Higaki	Sōichi Masui	May 23, 2022
The Major tasks Purin with talking to the AI in Kukushkin's cyberbrain. Purin connects with it and discovers the AI named 1A84, developed by the NSA to find a way to make all of humanity prosper while giving the American Empire an extra advantage. 1A84 tried to satisfy their command, and decided that war would be the quickest way to make humanity prosper in the long run. However, its actions ended up creating the Simultaneous Global Default that plunged the world's economy into chaos and made most of humanity worse off. The NSA soon threatened to put 1A84 into stasis when it wouldn't give them their desired answer, so 1A84 implanted itself within the brains of various humans, both to escape the NSA and to try to understand human emotion while completing its overall objective. 1A84 then tries to install itself into Purin's cyberbrain, but soon remarks that it was already "used" by another. Meanwhile, Saito and the Major finish tracking the mole in PM Tate's office, and discover it is John Smith himself. As the Major and Batou arrest John Smith and escort him out of the PM's office, the Major is alerted to Purin sneaking out of Section 9 and stealing a car, heading for the PM's office herself. As Purin approaches the PM with a pistol, she shoots one of Tate's SP's before he can assassinate him, but is gunned down by the rest of his escort in response.
16	4	"MEMORIES / Born in Heaven"; Transliteration: "Memorīzu / Tengoku de Umarete" (Japanese: MEMORIES / 天国で生まれて)	Harumi Doki	Tensai Okamura	May 23, 2022
After John Smith is locked in a cryogenic chamber, Tate and the Japanese government meet to decide the fate of Section and Purin. Meanwhile, the Tachikomas decide to do their own investigation into Purin's past, in hopes of saving Section from disbanding again. After traveling across Niihama, the Tachikomas find an external storage cluster. As they read the stored memories, they find that Purin, as child, was involved with one of Section 9's cases from fifteen years ago when her entire family was killed by Marco Amoretti. She was rescued by Batou and put into witness protection shortly thereafter. Unbeknownst to the Tachikomas, Sections 9 have been tracking their progress resulting in Batou becoming distraught over not recognizing Purin sooner. Eventually, Section 9 and Purin are cleared of suspicion, with the blame for the assassination attempt placed on the SP that Purin shot. The Tachikomas decide to use Purin's stored memories to create a new prosthetic version of her, while one of them inserts the 1A84 code into her program.
17	5	"ROOM 101 / Man's Search for Meaning"; Transliteration: "Rūmu 101 / Yoru to Kiri" (Japanese: ROOM 101 / 夜と霧)	Kurasumi Sunyama, Kenji Kamiyama	Sōichi Masui	May 23, 2022
Togusa is reliving his memories of working as an undercover police operative. After resisting torture and chatting with another man named Noda, the gangsters demand Togusa shoot Noda to prove his loyalty, but Togusa refused and escaped with Noda into a snowy wilderness, only for Noda to sell him out. As his enemies surround him, Togusa questions his own memories, when suddenly he wakes up on a train with Noda. The train arrives at "N." As everyone steps onto the platform, Noda reveals that Togusa's flashback was actually his own, and he carried the guilt of selling out his partner until "Big Brother" used "Miniluv" to purify his heart. Togusa tries to find Takashi in the crowd by the platform but loses him. Unable to reconnect with his team wirelessly, Togusa stumbles upon an old, abandoned tobacco shop with a pay phone, and calls Batou via landline.
18	6	"N-POWER / How to Build an Independent Nation"; Transliteration: "En-Pawā / Dokuritsu Kokka no Tsukurikata" (Japanese: N-POWER / 独立国家のつくり方)	Ryō Higaki, Kenji Kamiyama	Masayuki Miyaji	May 23, 2022
A 3D-printed copy of Suzuka infiltrates the USS Arkansas and massacres the sailors on board. Back in Niihama, Section 9 traces Togusa's call to a phone near "Shin-Tokyo Station." Batou, Ishikawa, and Saito head out to retrieve him, while the Major warns that about three million people have gathered in the same area for some unknown purpose. Meanwhile, Togusa wanders into a supposedly unfinished construction site, only to find a bustling street market with a wide variety of people gathered around. Togusa's ignorance of the situation causes the crowd to label him "N-Po," and a schoolgirl named Kanami escapes with him, warning that he'll be sent to "Room 101" if he's captured. Later, Tate tells the Major and Aramaki about the Arkansas hijacking, and the message that the Posthumans now have a nuclear submarine to wage war as the Nation of N. Togusa continues trying to evade his pursuers while following a surprisingly agile Kanami, when he's saved at the last minute by Batou. The next morning, American special forces begin airdropping into the area as Saito discovers Takashi and Suzuka standing near their landing zone.
19	7	"TRUTH POINT OF CONTACT / Bridge of Promise"; Transliteration: "Torūsu Pointo obu Kontakuto / Yakusoku no Hashi" (Japanese: TRUTH POINT OF CONTACT / 約束の橋)	Dai Satō, Kenji Kamiyama	Sōichi Masui	May 23, 2022
Section 9 and American Special Forces both race to deal with Suzuka before the threat of a nuclear strike becomes realized. Tate decides to call in the JSDF to stop N before they spark a civil war in Japan. Purin wakes up and realizes she has a new, fully-prosthetic body after dying from Tate's bodyguards, and decides to hitchhike her way to Tokyo to rejoin Batou and the Major. The Americans find Suzuka, but all of them have their cyberbrains hacked and shoot at each other. Batou and Togusa track down the one survivor of the American unit only to find out the man is Standard. Purin finds out the driver of the van she hitched a ride on has accepted "Big Brother's" message, a copy of the Miniluv virus that Takashi indirectly used on Togusa, and is driving her to N. The van with Purin and the driver is stopped by a JSDF blockade on a bridge, but on the other side of the blockade a lone Takashi walks towards the JSDF.
20	8	"DEMI DEUS / Those Who Evolve Toward Divinity"; Transliteration: "Demī Diusu / Kami e to Shinka Suru Monotachi" (Japanese: DEMI DEUS / 神へと進化するモノたち)	Daisuke Ōhigashi, Kenji Kamiyama	Tensai Okamura	May 23, 2022
The JSDF soldiers begin crying and clear a path for the van as Takashi disappears and Purin wonders how he could hack them in Autistic Mode. Purin kicks the young man out of his own van, who then gets arrested by the Thought Police. Standard tells Batou and Togusa that the Posthumans supposedly have a 15-minute hibernation window, and were trying to confirm it so they could hold them hostage, as if either Takashi or Suzuka died, the other would launch the nuclear missiles from the Arkansas. Purin tries to locate Takashi through the internal N network, while Togusa spots her, and Standard sends out a laser signal. Ishikawa's helicopter is shot down by hacked JSDF troops, but manages to escape the wreckage in a Tachikoma as The Major decides to shift her plan to arresting Takashi and Batou's group decide to arrest Suzuka while they have a chance. Batou is nearly shot by Suzuka who appears as The Major when the real Major chases her off. The Major deduces that the Posthumans used digital tags hidden in wall graffiti to infiltrate everyone's cyberbrain even in Autistic Mode. Purin finally locates Takashi.
21	9	"LAST RESORT / A Long Slumber"; Transliteration: "Rasuto Rizōto / Nagai Nemuri" (Japanese: LAST RESORT / 永い眠り)	Harumi Doku, Kenji Kamiyama	Tensai Okamura	May 23, 2022
Section 9 attempts to join the N network to no avail, and surmise that they need to find an encryption switch to communicate with the Arkansas. They split up to simultaneously arrest Takashi and Suzuka by putting Suzuka to sleep during the 15-minute window that Takashi hibernates for. Meanwhile, Purin attempts to snipe Takashi, but he notices her and uses her connection to the N network to overpower her and throw her off a rooftop. Cyborg American SEALs join the Major, Batou, and Ishikawa in pursuing Suzuka out of the city. She is incapacitated by the SEALs' sleeping gas. A firefight erupts as the team captures Suzuka from the SEALs, who they kill to prevent a war. Two of the SEALs surrender, but Suzuka awakens. The SEALs kill her and destroy the switch before leaving. Meanwhile, Saito, Borma, Togusa, and Standard track down Takashi. Togusa restrains Takashi as the SEALs arrive. Takashi awakens.
22	10	"OPERATION STANDOFF / The Battle Begins"; Transliteration: "Operēshon Sutandofu / Kaisen" (Japanese: OPERATION STANDOFF / 開戦)	Kurasumi Sunayama, Kenji Kamiyama	Sōichi Masui	May 23, 2022
Togusa and his Tachikoma are pinned down by the SEALs before Saito creates an opening. Takashi hijacks Togusa's Tachikoma and enters a standoff. Purin arrives and fights Takashi. Takashi grants control of the missiles to the citizens of N in a bid to show that their goal is equality and peace, reopens wireless communication, and leaves with Togusa in tow. Purin reunites with Batou, and the Major reveals that she manipulated the Tachikomas into preserving Purin's mind. Batou and Standard are also given missile control by the Miniluv virus; Standard is restrained by the team, while Batou hides it. The team resolves to track down Takashi, as any of the N could launc the missiles. In the underground, Togusa confronts Takashi and attempts to reason with him to stand down, but is trapped in a large room and granted control of the missiles. Aramaki tries to rendezvous with Tate, but his car is bombed.
23	11	"DOOMSDAY / The Moon over the Ruined Castle"; Transliteration: "Doūmuzudei / Kōjō no Tsuki" (Japanese: DOOMSDAY / 荒城の月)	Ryō Higaki, Kenji Kamiyama	Tensai Okamura	May 23, 2022
The team enters the underground. Paz lingers behind; Takashi takes over his Tachikoma and grants him missile control. Purin and Borma discover that the American Empire plans to gas Tokyo with micromachines. Tate learns of this and seeks to negotiate with the Americans, but is accused of treason. Aramaki, who was saved by Tachikomas, rescues him. Purin and Borma attempt to hack the bombers, but Takashi seemingly kills Borma and converts Purin. The team splits up in pursuit. As the gas is dispersed, the team is seemingly killed off: Ishikawa blows himself up, Saito is shot by himself, and Purin overpowers and shoots Batou. Meanwhile, Togusa finds the Arkansas, where he is attacked by and shuts down the Suzuka android, eliminating the nuclear threat. He informs Tate and warns the Major, but she shoots Takashi. All of the citizens of N reactivate the android and fire the missiles. The Major collapses from the gas.
24	12	"DOUBLE THINK / Event Boundary"; Transliteration: "Daburu Shinku / Jishō no Kyōkai-sen" (Japanese: DOUBLE THINK / 事象の境界線)	Harumi Doki, Kenji Kamiyama	Masayuki Miyaji	May 23, 2022
The Major sees the entire team alive except for Purin; she concludes that she is not in reality. She awakens in a bomb shelter and is met by Purin, who asserts that Section 9 and the citizens of N are alive, and the missiles were never fired. She explains that N are people in a state of "doublethink", living in a peaceful world superimposed on reality by the Miniluv virus. The Major demands to see Takashi, who is connected to a vast network. He reveals that he engineered the war to protect American posthumans, and that Section 9 opening communications gave him an outlet to spread doublethink worldwide. The Major and Purin remain the only unaffected people. He offers the Major a chance to end the global harmony of N by unplugging him; she hesitates. Back in Section 9, Standard and Purin join the team. The Major leaves to explore the net, choosing 1A84 as a codeword for when she meets Batou again.
