= No\Name =

Japanese manga series

- First tankōbon volume cover
- Genre: Action; Mystery; Supernatural
- Manga
- Written by: Rafał Jaki
- Illustrated by: Machine Gamu
- Published by: Shueisha
- Imprint: Jump Comics+
- Magazine: Shōnen Jump+
- Original run: July 31, 2024 – February 5, 2025
- Volumes: 2

No\Name (stylized in all caps) is a Japanese manga series written by Rafał Jaki, the creator of Cyberpunk: Edgerunners, and illustrated by Machine Gamu, known for their work as an assistant illustrator on Gachiakuta. The series began as a one-shot posted on the Manga Plus Creators platform before being serialized on Shueisha's Shōnen Jump+ website between July 2024 and February 2025.

== Plot ==
Set in a world where people's names bestow them with superhuman abilities, No\Name follows two agents (Ralf Olsen and Ursula) from the Nordic Naming Bureau (NNB), an organization dedicated to investigating crimes committed by "Namers". The story begins as the agents tackle a case involving a man searching for his missing wife and son. However, the situation escalates when they encounter the man, who harbors a dangerous intent to grant his son the same powerful name as his own.

== Publication ==
Written by Rafał Jaki and illustrated by Machine Gamu, No\Name began as a one-shot posted on the Manga Plus Creators platform in September 2023. It won the Gold Award and was published on Shōnen Jump+ on January 26, 2024. It later began serialization on the same website on July 31 that same year. The series' chapters are simultaneously published in English on Shueisha's Manga Plus platform. The series ended serialization on February 5, 2025. The series' chapters were collected into two tankōbon volumes.

| No. | Japanese release date | Japanese ISBN |
|---|---|---|
| 1 | October 4, 2024 | 978-4-08-884282-0 |
| 2 | April 4, 2025 | 978-4-08-884370-4 |
