= Rebecca (Cyberpunk: Edgerunners) =

Cyperpunk 2077 character

- Cyberpunk 2077 character
- Rebecca in Cyberpunk: Edgerunners
- First appearance: "Smooth Criminal" (2022)
- Created by: Yoshiki Usa
- Designed by: Hiroyuki Imaishi and Yuto Kaneko
- Voiced by: EN: Alex Cazares; JA: Tomoyo Kurosawa

In-universe information
- Origin: Night City, California
- Nationality: American

Rebecca (Japanese: レベッカ, Hepburn: Rebekka) is a character from the 2022 anime Cyberpunk: Edgerunners, a Studio Trigger-produced series for the Netflix streaming service, and a tie in to CD Projekt Red's first person video game Cyberpunk 2077. A short slender woman with teal hair and light blue skin, she is a member of the mercenary group that performs various job in the fictional Night City. In the show, she helps protagonist David, developing unrequited feelings for him as she struggles to keep him sane from the mental strain of his cybernetic enhancements. In the show's climax, she helps David rescue his girlfriend Lucy, only to be killed shortly after by the villain Adam Smasher. She and her brother later appeared in the prequel manga Cyberpunk: Edgerunners Madness. In English, Rebecca is voiced by Alex Cazares, while in Japanese she is voiced by Tomoyo Kurosawa.

== Appearances ==
Rebecca is a short, cyborg woman introduced in the 2022 anime series Cyberpunk: Edgerunners, set in the Cyberpunk role-playing game universe and a tie-in series to CD Projekt Red's first person video game Cyberpunk 2077. First introduced in the third episode titled "Smooth Criminal", she is a member of a group mercenaries known as "Edgerunners" that perform various jobs in the fictional Night City, located in California. Voiced in English by Alex Cazares and Tomoyo Kurosawa in Japanese, she helps protagonist David, who was pressed into Edgerunning work to make ends meet after the death of his mother, as well as fellow character Lucy.

While initially shown as chaotic and interested in causing trouble for corporations around the series, after the loss of her brother Pilar she gradually begins to mature, and develops feelings for David. Despite him not returning such affections, she helps him through a psychotic episode he suffers due to overuse of cybernetic augmentations. After Lucy is kidnapped by the villain Faraday, she helps David to rescue her. Though she objects to his use of an experimental suit, she helps to administer drugs to keep David sane. However, after they rescue Lucy, they are attacked by villain Adam Smasher who was sent to retrieve the suit. Rebecca attempts to shoot him, but she dies instantly when he lands on and crushes her into the ground.

Outside of the anime, Rebecca later re-appears in the prequel manga series Cyberpunk: Edgerunners Madness, which focuses on her and Pilar's early days. In gaming, her shotgun named "Guts" was added as an in-game item for Cyberpunk 2077, and she was featured as one of the usable characters in the video game's board game adaptation as well as its box art. In 2026, as part of a collaboration Rebecca and Lucy were added to the gacha action role-playing game Wuthering Waves, with Rebecca being a free unit for players to obtain.

== Design and conception ==
Rebecca is a skinny, short woman with pale light-blue skin. Her hair is neon teal, tied into two ponytails on each side of her head and held in place by a black headband. Meanwhile, her eyes are a solid red including the pupil and area outside of the iris, with the iris itself being a neon green color. Her skin has fissure lines beneath her eyes, as well as above her biceps and on her wrists. Rebecca had three pink tattoos: a jawless skull tattoo along her neck wrapping around past her collar area, a horned ram skull on her stomach that wraps around her sides, and a band tattoo on her right hip with stylized letters that spell "PK DICK". Her attire consists of a dark blue strapless bra and matching panties, a large similarly colored coat with green highlights that extends to her hips, and shoes that match her coat. During the show, she equips the "Gorilla Arms" body modification from the game, which gives her oversized mechanical red and blue hands on her right and left wrists respectively.

The anime series was developed as part of a partnership between CD Projekt Red and Studio Trigger, for the Netflix streaming platform. In the earliest drafts of the story, Rebecca did not exist as a character, instead a character named Kyle taking her role. Both companies agreed to the idea of changing the character's gender, and by the fourth draft they had decided on her name, with some elements of Kyle's role being given to another character, Julio. Her design was conceived by Yoshiki Usa, Trigger's vice president and producer for the production, who felt when they made the character a woman she should have a complex childlike character who was cheerful on the outside but treated badly by her brother. Originally Rebecca did not have much importance in the plot, however by episode 7 directors Masahiko Otsuka and Hiroyuki Imaishi heavily rewrote the plot, giving her what Usa considered an inflated appearance in the show's storyboards. In an interview with Famitsu, Otsuka expressed a preference for the character, and that much of her dialogue had to be cut during production.

The design was developed by animator Hiroyuki Imaishi, and illustrated by artist Yuto Kaneko. In an interview, Imaishi stated the importance of varying up the character designs so animation deformation would not cause characters to blend together and be difficult to tell apart, and to this end chose to make Rebecca visibly short. Additionally, her design was meant to contrast against Lucy's, to help emphasize the latter's role as the heroine of the production. Imaishi was pleased with the outcome of her character, feeling that her inclusion helped motivate the team. The staff of CD Projekt Red however objected to her inclusion, with the creative team voting to remove her from the cast due to feeling that she was a loli, and that such character designs did not fit the Cyberpunk 2077 aesthetic. Studio Trigger refused to change her appearance, stating directly that "the loli must stay". One of CD Projeckt's developers speaking on the matter expressed in retrospect feeling guilty for voting for her removal, calling her the "best girl" of the production.

In 2025, series and Madness writer Bartosz Sztybor stated at Anime Expo 2025 that the character was truly dead at the end of Edgerunners' first season. He added that while it was hard to kill off other characters such as David, "it was a pleasure killing Rebecca, so I’m sorry for that". Imaishi chose to frame their deaths in a similar manner after it was decided to kill Pilar, showing them from three different viewpoints for each to emphasize their role as tragic siblings.

== Promotion and reception ==
Rebecca's short stature, attitude, and appearance received significant commentary and examination. While it received significant praise particularly from Japanese outlets, Jade King of western media outlet TheGamer disliked her sexualization and fan response in this aspect, particularly in her introduction.

Several pieces of merchandise featuring Rebecca have been released since her introduction, such as a statue by Dark Horse Comics illustrating her brief fight with Smasher, as well as a figure built on a plastic mold runner by Max Factory, recreating artwork of the character by animator Sushio. A 1/4 scale statue was also released by Prime 1 Studio, featuring various accessories. Several other figures of the character have also been released by companies such as Kamado, Youtooz, Good Smile, and Anonymous Studio. Other items include a black jacket with her chest tattoo on the back, a gaming chair, plastic art standees, and a plush toy also produced by Good Smile. In 2026, her appearance was used for an in-game cosmetic skin for the character Rampart in the game Apex Legends, as part of a crossover between it and the Cyberpunk franchise.

Rebecca was very popular upon debut, described as a fan favorite and a frequent subject of cosplay. At the 7th Crunchyroll Anime Awards, Rebecca was nominated for "Best Supporting Character". Steve Jones of Anime News Network describe the character as personifying the strengths of Edgerunners, stating that by adding her Studio Trigger was able to incorporate their "signature brand of chaos in this violent foul-mouthed gremlin girl" for the series and furthermore called her the glue that held it together. He added that through her Edgerunners was also able to tell a better tale of the Cyberpunk setting's tragedy of grim politics than the related game, while at the same time adding "humor and pathos" to David's character arc and carrying some of the story's most seething and sensitive moments. Additional praise was given for her character design, calling it stellar for how it utilized a large overcoat with her massive hands, and the "delightfully apeshit" performance by Kurosawa.

Lilia Hellal of Rice Digital praised Rebecca as having an entertaining wholesome and volatile character, despite feeling she was sidelined too often in Edgerunners' story. Hellal felt that her loudmouthed demeanor and vulgarity was a mask to hide her emotional pain at the loss of her brother, illustrated by her care and concern for others in the group. She further highlighted how at one point in the story she helps bring David out of a psychotic episode, and despite her unrequited feelings for him encourages him to save Lucy and goes along with the suicide mission. She further praised the character's bravery and loyalty, stating that her sudden death helped underline the melancholy feel of the series as a whole. Discussing her design, Hellal pointed out that her tattoos and color scheme suggested she was a former member of the Mox, a group of sex workers in the Cyberpunk setting, and further punctuated the sense of found family she brought to the show's cast.

Meanwhile, Jade King of TheGamer felt that Rebecca represented anime's obsession with the loli character archetype. While she agreed with Trigger's decision to keep the character, arguing that petite and shorter women would exist in Cyberpunk's dystopian world, she felt the character did not lean into that distinction with "pure intentions". Specifically citing how the character was introduced in her underwear, King expressed Rebecca was presented so the viewer would examine her figure without knowing anything about her, "taking in her small height, flat chest, and immature figure at face value like it is something to be admired". She added that while Rebecca was framed as capable and an adult, she expressed her dislike that Rebecca was the only character she saw framed as a young child, and dismay at fan response to this aspect which she felt carried into her casual attire's exposed legs. Despite this, she considered Rebecca a bright spot in Edgerunners's storytelling, just hampered by the perceived sexualization.

In contrast, Hiroki Tokunaga of Game Watch praised her design, stating that while all of the characters had personality that fit the worldview, Rebecca stood out for her appearance, praising the contrast of her pink tattoos with her skin and stating their placement made her look "quite impactful". While he staff of Game Spark commented on her small body, they also emphasized her nose, describing the bridge as particularly strong. Inaka Frog of Real Sound stated that while CD Projeckt Red's rejection of the design made sense within the scope of their world, they also understood why Studio Trigger pushed for their inclusion, as without such a character the overall production would have felt one-sided and not had the same sort of fun they saw as inherent to anime, and enjoyed the contrast of her young woman appearance to her aggressive outlaw persona. In light of her popularity, Frog stated that Rebecca represented the difference in ideals between the two companies that ended up elevating the overall work and helped make it more interesting, with fans seeing her as a mascot for it.

In a review of Madness, Elijah Gonzalez for AV Club stated that while the story focused on Rebecca's earlier, less experienced days, it helped demonstrate why she was such a popular character through a "compelling combination of do-gooderism and trigger-happy outbursts" on her part. He additionally enjoyed how it helped flesh out her character's interests and goals prior to her appearance in the anime, as well as her brother and how he regarded and treated Rebecca.
