= Koki Uchiyama =

Japanese voice actor (born 1990)

- 内山 昂輝
- Born: August 16, 1990 (age 36); Saitama Prefecture, Japan
- Education: Waseda University
- Occupations: Actor; voice actor
- Years active: 2003–present

Koki Uchiyama (内山 昂輝, Uchiyama Kōki; born August 16, 1990) is a Japanese actor who specializes in voice acting. He is affiliated with Himawari Theatre Group. He won Best Male Rookie at 5th Seiyu Awards. He also received one of Best Voice Actors at Tokyo Anime Award Festival in 2015. His voice roles include Roxas and Ventus in the Kingdom Hearts series, Neku Sakuraba in The World Ends with You, Yuu Otosaka in Charlotte, Kei Tsukishima in Haikyu!!, Tomura Shigaraki in My Hero Academia, Rei Suwa in Buddy Daddies, Meruem in Hunter × Hunter, Toge Inumaki in Jujutsu Kaisen, Yuri Plisetsky in Yuri on Ice, Soul Eater Evans in Soul Eater, Rin Itoshi in Blue Lock, and D in Cyberpunk: Edgerunners 2

== Biography ==
Uchiyama joined Sunflower Theater Group in 1993 with intention to appear in television dramas and films as a child actor. He made his voice acting debut as a child in the film A.I.

In 2011, Uchiyama won the 5th Seiyu Awards. On January 11, 2015, he began hosting his own radio program and subsequently won the Voice Actor Award at the Tokyo Anime Award Festival 2015.

== Filmography ==
=== Television animation ===
List of voice performances in anime
Year	Title	Role	Notes	Sources
2007	Ghost Hound	Young pupil		
2008	Soul Eater	Soul Eater Evans		
2010	Beyblade: Metal Masters	Jack		
2010	Fairy Tail	Midnight	2010–2015	
2010	Shiki	Natsuno Yuuki		
2011	Beyblade: Metal Fury	Jack		
2011	C: The Money of Soul and Possibility Control	Kimimaro Yoga		
2011	Guilty Crown	Daryl Yan		
2011	Infinite Stratos	Ichika Orimura		
2011	Kimi to Boku	Yuta Asaba		
2011	Yu-Gi-Oh! Zexal	Kaito Tenjo		
2012	Aquarion EVOL	Kagura Demuri		
2012	Beyblade: Shogun Steel	Shinobu Hiryuin		
2012	Blast of Tempest	Yoshino Takigawa		
2012	Crash!	Kazuhiko Midorikawa		
2012	Good Luck Girl!	Keita Tsuwabuki		
2012	Pocket Monsters: Best Wishes! Season 2	Kotetsu		
2012	Tanken Driland	Pahn		
2012	The World Ends With You	Neku Sakuraba		
2012	Tsuritama	Natsuki Usami		
2012	World War Blue	Til		
2013	Ace of Diamond	Takahiro Ohmae		
2013	Hunter × Hunter (2011)	Meruem		
2013	Little Battlers Experience	Inui Kagetora		
2013	Love Lab	Yuuya Tanahashi		
2013	Red Data Girl	Miyuki Sagara		
2013	Sunday Without God	Alice Color		
2014	Amagi Brilliant Park	Seiya Kanie		
2014	Barakamon	Hiroshi Kido		
2014	Buddy Complex	Dio Jyunyou Weinberg		
2014	Captain Earth	Zin		
2014	Duel Masters Versus	Shobu Kirifuda (adult)/Mister Match		
2014	Gundam Build Fighters Try	Daigo Ishibashi		
2014	Mushi-Shi -Next Passage-	Ryu		
2014	Nisekoi	Raku Ichijou		
2014	Nobunaga Concerto	Nobuyuki Oda		
2014	Haikyu!!	Kei Tsukishima		
2014	HappinessCharge PreCure!	Yuya Kaido		
2014	Snow White with the Red Hair	Prince (actor)	Ep. 12	
2014	Soul Eater Not!	Soul Eater Evans		
2014	Ping Pong the Animation	Makoto "Smile" Tsukimoto		
2014	Yu-Gi-Oh! Arc-V	Kaito Tenjo		
2015	Charlotte	Yū Otosaka		
2015	Death Parade	Clavis		
2015	Duel Masters Versus Revolution	Shobu Kirifuda (adult)		
2015	Haikyu!! Second Season	Kei Tsukishima		
2015	Minna Atsumare! Falcom Gakuen	Rean Schwarzer		
2015	Nisekoi:	Raku Ichijou		
2015	One-Punch Man	Melzargard	Ep. 10-12	
2015	Rokka no Yūsha	Goldof Auora		
2015	Show By Rock!!	Aion		
2015	Q Transformers: The Mystery of Convoy Returns	Smokescreen		
2016	Battery: The Animation	Takumi Harada		
2016	Concrete Revolutio	Shin	Ep. 16	
2016	Duel Masters Versus Revolution Final	Shobu Kirifuda (adult)		
2016	Haikyū!! Karasuno High School vs Shiratorizawa Academy	Kei Tsukishima		
2016	Macross Delta	Messer Ihlefeld		
2016	Mobile Suit Gundam Unicorn RE:0096	Banagher Links		
2016	My Hero Academia	Tomura Shigaraki		
2016	Nijiiro Days	Tsuyoshi Naoe		
2016	RS Project -Rebirth Storage-	Rin Sagami		
2016	Show by Rock!!♯	Aion		
2016	Show By Rock!! Short!!	Aion		
2016	WWW.Working!!	Masahiro Adachi		
2016	Yuri on Ice	Yuri Plisetsky		
2017	Altair: A Record of Battles	Beyazit		
2017	Anonymous Noise	Momo Sakaki		
2017	Devilman Crybaby	Akira Fudo		
2017	Dive!!	Reiji Maruyama		
2017	Evil or Live	Shin		
2017	Fate/Apocrypha	Shirou Kotomine/Amakusa Shirō Tokisada		
2017	My Hero Academia 2nd Season	Tomura Shigaraki		
2017	The Ancient Magus' Bride	Ruth		
2018	Free! – Dive to the Future	Ikuya Kirishima		
2018	My Hero Academia 3rd Season	Tomura Shigaraki		
2018	Run with the Wind	Takashi Sugiyama		
2018	Shinya! Tensai Bakabon	Hajime	Ep.9	
2018	Violet Evergarden	Benedict Blue		
2019	Astra Lost in Space	Ulgar Zweig		
2019	Demon Slayer: Kimetsu no Yaiba	Rui		
2019	Is It Wrong to Try to Pick Up Girls in a Dungeon? II	Soma		
2019	My Hero Academia 4th Season	Tomura Shigaraki		
2019	Revisions	Daisuke Dojima		
2019	Sarazanmai	Toi Kuji		
2019	Teasing Master Takagi-san 2	Hamaguchi		
2019	The Ones Within	Zakuro Oshigiri		
2019	To the Abandoned Sacred Beasts	Theodore Sherman (Minotaur)		
2020	Arad: Nizhuan Zhi Lun	Lucas Yi		
2020	Bungo and Alchemist: Gears of Judgement	Yoji		
2020	Gleipnir	Kaito		
2020	Grand Blues!	Skull		
2020	Haikyu!! To The Top	Kei Tsukishima		
2020	Ikebukuro West Gate Park	Takashi Ando		
2020	Jujutsu Kaisen	Toge Inumaki		
2020	Fate/Grand Carnival	Tristan, Amakusa Shirou		
2020	Kakushigoto	Somethingemon Ishikawa	Ep.12	
2020	Show by Rock!! Mashumairesh!!	Aion	Ep. 7	
2020	The God of High School	Park Il-Pyo		
2020	SD Gundam World Sangoku Soketsuden	Zhuge Liang Freedom Gundam		
2020	Tower of God	Khun Hachuling		
2020	Wave, Listen to Me!	Shinji Oki		
2021	Farewell, My Dear Cramer	Tetsuji Yamada		
2021	Horimiya	Izumi Miyamura		
2021	Irina: The Vampire Cosmonaut	Lev Leps		
2021	Megaton Musashi	Reiji Amemiya		
2021	My Hero Academia 5th Season	Tomura Shigaraki		
2021	Sakugan	Fidelio		
2021	SD Gundam World Heroes	Zhuge Liang Freedom Gundam		
2021	Shabake	Nikichi		
2021	Show by Rock!! Stars!!	Aion		
2021	SSSS.Dynazenon	Sizumu		
2021	Takt Op. Destiny	Takt Asahina		
2021	The World Ends with You the Animation	Neku Sakuraba		
2021	Zombie Land Saga Revenge	Shojiro Ito		
2022	Akiba Maid War	Debt Collector		
2022	Aoashi	Yōichi Kiriki		
2022	Bibliophile Princess	Alexei Strasser		
2022	Black Summoner	Kelvin		
2022	Blue Lock	Rin Itoshi		
2022	Dance Dance Danseur	Ruō Mori		
2022	Fuuto PI	Philip		
2022	Heroines Run the Show	Yūjirō Someya		
2022	I'm the Villainess, So I'm Taming the Final Boss	Elephas Levi		
2022	My Hero Academia 6th Season	Tomura Shigaraki		
2022	Orient	Akihiro Shimazu		
2022	Play It Cool, Guys	Shun Futami		
2022	Pokémon Hisuian Snow	Akio		
2022	Teasing Master Takagi-san 3	Hamaguchi		
2023	Buddy Daddies	Rei Suwa		
2023	Four Knights of the Apocalypse	Shin		
2023	Horimiya: The Missing Pieces	Izumi Miyamura		
2023	Magical Destroyers	@Gō		
2023	My Love Story with Yamada-kun at Lv999	Akito Yamada		
2023	Sugar Apple Fairy Tale	William Alburn		
2023	The Ancient Magus' Bride 2nd Season	Ruth		
2023	The Ice Guy and His Cool Female Colleague	Saejima-kun		
2023	The Legend of Heroes: Trails of Cold Steel – Northern War	Rean Schwarzer		
2023	The Marginal Service	Peck Desmont		
2023	The Misfit of Demon King Academy II	Gerard Azulema		
2023	The Most Heretical Last Boss Queen	Stale		
2023	Jujutsu Kaisen Season 2	Toge Inumaki		
2023	Tokyo Revengers: Tenjiku Arc	Shion Madarame		
2023	Trigun Stampede	Legato Bluesummers		
2024	Blue Exorcist: Shimane Illuminati Saga	Lucifer		
2024	Blue Lock vs. U-20 Japan	Rin Itoshi		
2024	Bye Bye, Earth	Adonis Kuestion		
2024	Delicious in Dungeon	Mithrun		
2024	Delico's Nursery	Theodore Classico (Adolescent)		
2024	Dragon Ball Daima	Glorio		
2024	Kaiju No. 8	Gen Narumi		
2024	Mashle: The Divine Visionary Candidate Exam Arc	Carpaccio Luo-Yang		
2024	Mission: Yozakura Family	Sui Aoi		
2024	My Hero Academia 7th Season	Tomura Shigaraki		
2024	My Instant Death Ability Is So Overpowered	Yogiri Takatou		
2024	Nina the Starry Bride	Seto		
2024	Oshi no Ko Season 2	Taiki Himekawa		
2024	Solo Leveling	Kang Taeshik		
2024	The Apothecary Diaries	Rikuson		
2024	Wind Breaker	Kyōtarō Sugishita		
2025	Captivated, by You	Jōji Ema		
2025	Farmagia	Manas		
2025	Lazarus	HQ		
2025	Milky Subway: The Galactic Limited Express	Kurt Cramer		
2025	Sakamoto Days	Gaku		
2025	To Be Hero X	Dragon Boy		
2025	The Fragrant Flower Blooms with Dignity	Saku Natsusawa		
2025	Wandance	Kaboku Kotani		
2025	My Hero Academia: Final Season	Tomura Shigaraki		
2026	Dark Machine: The Animation	Shinn		
2026	Dead Account	Kukuru Kasubata		
2026	Digimon Beatbreak	Haruomi Sone		
2026	Firefly Wedding	Shinpei Gotō		
2026	Hana-Kimi	Daiki Kayashima		
2026	Love Through a Prism	Kit Church		
2026	Sparks of Tomorrow	Yosuke Mizoe		
2026	Tank Chair	Nagi Taira		
2026	The Case Book of Arne	Arne Neuntöte		
2027	Bless	Akiharu Nakano		
2027	Inherit the Winds	Hijikata Toshizō		
2027	Fate Rewinder	Shirai		
2027	Phantom Busters	Kaoru Kanzaki		
TBA	Junket Bank	Haruto Hinagata		
TBA	The Boxer	Yu		

=== Original video animation (OVA) ===
List of voice performances in OVA
Year	Title	Role	Notes	Source
2003	The Animatrix – Beyond	Masaji		
2010	Infinite Stratos Encore: A Sextet Yearning for Love	Ichika Orimura		
2010	Mobile Suit Gundam Unicorn	Banagher Links	2010–2014	
2012	Kindaichi Case Files: Black Magic Murder	Izawa Kentaro		
2013	Infinite Stratos 2: Long Vacation Edition	Ichika Orimura		
2013	Ah! My Goddess: Together Forever	Maezono		
2014	Amagi Brilliant Park OVA	Seiya Kanie		
2014	Fantasista Stella	Kaoru Okita		
2014	Haikyū!! Lev Kenzan!	Kei Tsukishima		
2014	Infinite Stratos 2: World Purge-hen	Ichika Orimura		
2014	Nisekoi – Loss / Shrine Maiden	Raku Ichijou		
2015	Ah! My Goddess: Together Forever	Maezono		
2015	Sōsei no Aquarion Love	Kagura Demuri		
2016	Under the Dog	Shunichi Nanase		
2019	Thus Spoke Kishibe Rohan	Yoma Hashimoto	OVA 4	
2021	The Ancient Magus' Bride: The Boy From the West and the Knight of the Mountain Haze	Ruth		
2023	Kiyoneko	Tsubasa		
2025	Yu-Gi-Oh! Card Game The Chronicles	Albaz		
2026	Cyberpunk: Edgerunners 2	D		

=== Film ===
List of voice performances in film
Year	Title	Role	Notes	Source
2003	Momoko, Kaeru no Uta ga Kikoeru yo.	Riki Kuramoto		
2011	Hotarubi no Mori e	Gin		
2011	Un-Go – Episode 0: Inga Chapter	Tatsuya Yamaga		
2015	Gekijōban Haikyu!! Owari to Hajimari	Kei Tsukishima		
2015	Gekijōban Haikyu!! Shōsha to Haisha	Kei Tsukishima		
2015	High Speed! Free! Starting Days	Ikuya Kirishima		
2015	The Anthem of the Heart	Takumi Sakagami, Egg		
2016	Pop in Q	Reno		
2017	Free! Timeless Medley	Ikuya Kirishima		
2017	Free! Take Your Marks	Ikuya Kirishima		
2017	Haikyu!! Sainō to Sense	Kei Tsukishima		
2017	Haikyu!! Concept no Tatakai	Kei Tsukishima		
2017	Space Battleship Yamato 2202: Warriors of Love – Tenmei-hen	Miru		
2018	Macross Delta the Movie: Passionate Walküre	Messer Ihlefeld		
2018	Mobile Suit Gundam Narrative	Banagher Links		
2018	The Ancient Magus Bride: Those Awaiting a Star	Ruth		
2019	Free! Road to the World – the Dream	Ikuya Kirishima		
2019	Kimi dake ni Motetainda	Shigekazu Toshida		
2019	My Hero Academia: Heroes Rising	Tomura Shigaraki		
2019	Violet Evergarden: Eternity and the Auto Memory Doll	Benedict Blue		
2020	Fate/Grand Order – Divine Realm of the Round Table: Camelot – Wandering; Agaterám	Tristan		
2020	Kono Sekai no Tanoshimikata: Secret Story Film	Yujiro		
2020	Violet Evergarden: The Movie	Benedict Blue		
2021	Evangelion: 3.0+1.0 Thrice Upon a Time	Ryoji Kaji (Junior)		
2021	Farewell, My Dear Cramer: First Touch	Tetsuji Yamada		
2021	Fate/Grand Order – Divine Realm of the Round Table: Camelot – Paladin: Agateram	Tristan		
2021	Free! The Final Stroke Part 1	Ikuya Kirishima		
2021	Jujutsu Kaisen 0	Toge Inumaki		
2021	Kakushigoto Theatrical Edition	Somethingemon Ishikawa		
2021	Macross Delta the Movie: Absolute Live!!!!!!	Messer Ihlefeld		
2022	Free! The Final Stroke Part 2	Ikuya Kirishima		
2022	Teasing Master Takagi-san: The Movie	Hamaguchi		
2022	The Seven Deadly Sins: Grudge of Edinburgh	Fairy		
2023	City Hunter The Movie: Angel Dust	Banagher Links		
2024	Blue Lock: Episode Nagi	Rin Itoshi		
2024	Dead Dead Demon's Dededede Destruction	Kenichi Kohiruimaki		
2024	Fuuto PI: The Portrait of Kamen Rider Skull	Phillip		
2024	Haikyu!! The Dumpster Battle	Kei Tsukishima		
2025	100 Meters	Zaitsu		
2026	The Ribbon Hero	Velvet		
2026	Unanswered//butterfly: Sword Art Online	Rex		

=== Tokusatsu ===
List of voice performances in Tokisatsu
Year	Title	Role	Notes	Source
2014	Ressha Sentai ToQger	Marionette Shadow	Ep. 9	
2020	Kamen Rider Saber	Desast	Eps.4 -	

=== Video games ===
List of voice performances in video games
Year	Title	Role	Notes	Source
2005	Kingdom Hearts II	Roxas	PS2, Also Final Mix in 2007	
2007	The World Ends with You	Neku Sakuraba	DS	
2008	The Sky Crawlers: Innocent Aces	Hagami	Wii	
2009	Kingdom Hearts 358/2 Days	Roxas	DS	
2010	Kingdom Hearts Birth by Sleep	Ventus, Roxas	PSP	
2010	Kingdom Hearts Re:coded	Roxas	DS	
2010	Dynasty Warriors: Gundam 3	Banagher Links	PlayStation 3, Xbox 360	
2011	Gundam Memories: Tatakai no Kioku	Banagher Links	PSP	
2011	Final Fantasy Type-0	Joker	PSP	
2012	Kingdom Hearts 3D: Dream Drop Distance	Neku Sakuraba, Ventus, Roxas	3DS	
2012	Little King's Story	Azure	PS Vita	
2012	Rune Factory 4	Lest		
2013	The Last of Us	Sam	PS3	
2013	Yu-Gi-Oh! Zexal World Duel Carnival	Kaito Tenjo	3DS	
2013	Dynasty Warriors Gundam Reborn	Banagher Links	PS3, PS Vita	
2013	JoJo's Bizarre Adventure: All Star Battle	Baoh	PS3, Also R in 2022	
2013	The Legend of Heroes: Trails of Cold Steel	Rean Schwarzer	PS4	
2014–17	Infinite Stratos games	Ichika Orimura		
2014–16	Haikyu!! series	Kei Tsukishima		
2014	Super Robot Wars Z3: Hell Chapter	Banagher Links, Kagura Demuri	PS3, PS Vita	
2014	The Legend of Heroes: Trails of Cold Steel II	Rean Schwarzer	PS4	
2014	Nisekoi: Yomeiri?!	Raku Ichijo	PS Vita	
2015	Yu-Gi-Oh! Arc-V Tag Force Special	Kaito Tenjo	PSP	
2015	Super Robot Wars Z3: Heaven Chapter	Banagher Links, Kagura Demuri	PS3, PS Vita	
2015	Captain Earth Mind Labyrinth	Zin		
2015	7th Dragon III Code: VFD	Player (Male)	3DS	
2015	Granblue Fantasy	Skull	iOS/Android	
2015	Xenoblade Chronicles X	Cross (Rival voice)	Wii U	
2016	Fate/Grand Order	Amakusa Shirō, Tristan		
2016	Detective Pikachu	Wallace Carroll	3DS	
2016	Mighty No. 9	Brandish	PS3, PS4, Wii U, Xbox 360, Xbox One	
2016	Yu-Gi-Oh! Duel Links	Kaito Tenjo	Android/iOS	
2017	Super Robot Wars V	Banagher Links	PS4, PS Vita, Nintendo Switch	
2017	Tales of the Rays	Kocis	Android/iOS	
2017	Another Eden	Aldo	Android/iOS, Switch	
2017	The Legend of Heroes: Trails of Cold Steel III	Rean Schwarzer	PS4/Nintendo Switch/PC	
2017	Dragon Quest Rivals	Camus		
2018	My Hero One's Justice	Tomura Shigaraki	PlayStation 4, Xbox One (not in Japan), Nintendo Switch, PC (not in Japan)	
2018	Dragalia Lost	Euden	Android/iOS	
2018	Idola: Phantasy Star Saga	Elwin	Android/iOS	
2018	Super Robot Wars X	Dio Junyoh Weinberg	PS4, PS Vita, Nintendo Switch	
2018	The Legend of Heroes: Trails of Cold Steel IV	Rean Schwarzer	PS4	
2018	Identity V	Aesop Carl (Embalmer)	Android/iOS, PC	
2019	Kingdom Hearts III	Ventus, Roxas	PS4, Xbox One	
2019	Dragon Marked for Death	Shinobi	Nintendo Switch, PS4	
2019	Devil May Cry 5	V	PS4, Xbox One, PC	
2019	Dragon Quest XI	Camus, Puff-Puff Girl	Nintendo 3DS, PS4, Nintendo Switch, Xbox One	
2019	Last Cloudia	Robin (Master Thief/Phantom Thief)	Android/iOS	
2020	My Hero One's Justice 2	Tomura Shigaraki	Nintendo Switch, PS4, Xbox One	
2020	Disney: Twisted-Wonderland	Idia Shroud	Android/iOS	
2020	The Legend of Heroes: Trails into Reverie	Rean Schwarzer	PS4	
2020	Kamen Rider: Memory of Heroez	Philip/Kamen Rider W	PS4, Nintendo Switch	
2020	Kingdom Hearts: Melody of Memory	Roxas	Nintendo Switch, PS4, Xbox One	
2020	Genshin Impact	Razor	Android/iOS, PC, PS4, Nintendo Switch	
2021	The Caligula Effect 2	Ryuto Tsukishima	PS4, Nintendo Switch	
2021	NEO: The World Ends With You	Neku Sakuraba	PS4, Nintendo Switch, PC	
2021	Demon Slayer: Kimetsu no Yaiba – The Hinokami Chronicles	Rui	PS4, PS5, Xbox One, Nintendo Switch	
2021	Super Robot Wars 30	Banagher Links	PS4, Nintendo Switch	
2022	JoJo's Bizarre Adventure: All-Star Battle R	Ikuro Hashizawa	Nintendo Switch, PS4, PS5, Xbox One	
2022	Yu-Gi-Oh! Cross Duel	Kaito Tenjo	Android/iOS	
2022	Harvestella	Brakka	Nintendo Switch	
2022	Dragon Quest Treasures	Camus, Monsters	Nintendo Switch	
2022	SD Gundam Battle Alliance	Banagher Links	PS4, PS5, Xbox One, Xbox Series X/S, Nintendo Switch, PC	
2022	Counter:Side	Ichinose Kaoru (Na Yubin)	PC, Android/iOS	
2022	Onmyoji	Susanoo	PC, Android/iOS	
2023	takt op. Symphony	Takt Asahina	Android/iOS	
2023	My Hero Ultra Rumble	Tomura Shigaraki	Nintendo Switch, PS4, Xbox One	
2023	Reverse: 1999	Kashapasha	Android/iOS	
2024	Jujutsu Kaisen: Cursed Clash	Toge Inumaki	Nintendo Switch, PC, PS4, PS5, Xbox One, Xbox Series X/S	
2024	Demon Slayer -Kimetsu no Yaiba- Sweep the Board!	Rui	Nintendo Switch, PS4, PS5, Xbox One	
2024	Solo Leveling: Arise	Taisei Michikado	Android/iOS	
2024	Reynatis	Kuon Seo	Nintendo Switch, PS4, PS5, PC	
2024	The Legend of Heroes: Trails Beyond the Horizon	Rean Schwarzer	PS4	
2024	Emberstoria	Dariush	Android/iOS	
2025	Xenoblade Chronicles X: Definitive Edition	Avatar (Male)	Nintendo Switch	
2025	Persona 5: The Phantom X	Protagonist	Android/iOS	
2025	Final Fantasy Tactics: The Ivalice Chronicles	Delita Heiral	Nintendo Switch, Nintendo Switch 2, PC, PS5, Xbox Series X/S	

=== Other dubbing ===
List of voice performances in live-action dubbing
Title	Role	Notes	Source
The Adventures of Sharkboy and Lavagirl in 3-D	Sharkboy	Voice dub for Taylor Lautner	
The Art of Getting By	George Zinavoy	Voice dub for Freddie Highmore	
The Batman	"Unseen Arkham Prisoner"/The Joker	Voice dub for Barry Keoghan	
Big Mommas: Like Father, Like Son	Trent Pierce	Voice dub for Brandon T. Jackson	
Dark Phoenix	Kurt Wagner / Nightcrawler	Voice dub for Kodi Smit-McPhee	
The Driftless Area	Pierre Hunter	Voice dub for Anton Yelchin	
Ender's Game	Bonzo Madrid	Voice dub for Moisés Arias	
Eternals	Druig	Voice dub for Barry Keoghan	
Genius	Paulo Picasso	Voice dub for Zachary Fall	
Into the Storm	Donnie	Voice dub for Max Deacon	
Journey to the Center of the Earth	Sean Anderson	Voice dub for Josh Hutcherson; 2010 TV Asahi edition	
Jurassic World	Zach Mitchell	Voice dub for Nick Robinson	
Lemony Snicket's A Series of Unfortunate Events	Klaus Baudelaire	Voice dub for Liam Aiken	
Lincoln	Robert Lincoln	Voice dub for Joseph Gordon-Levitt	
The Mortal Instruments: City of Bones	Jace Wayland	Voice dub for Jamie Campbell Bower	
Mr. Robot	Elliot Alderson	Voice dub for Rami Malek	
Notes on a Scandal	Steven Connolly	Voice dub for Andrew Simpson	
Nowhere Boy	Paul McCartney	Voice dub for Thomas Brodie-Sangster	
Parasite	Kim Ki-woo	Voice dub for Choi Woo-shik; 2021 BS Tokyo edition	
The Return	Ivan	Voice dub for Ivan Dobronravov	
Secondhand Lions	Walter Coleman	Voice dub for Haley Joel Osment	
Supernatural	Jack	Voice dub for Alexander Calvert	
Terminator Salvation	Kyle Reese	Voice dub for Anton Yelchin	
Tolkien	J. R. R. Tolkien	Voice dub for Nicholas Hoult	
X-Men: Apocalypse	Kurt Wagner / Nightcrawler	Voice dub for Kodi Smit-McPhee	

List of voice performances in animation dubbing
Title	Role	Notes	Source
Ballerina	Rudy		
Klaus	Jesper		
Puss in Boots	BB henchman		
Robots	Young Rodney Copperbottom		

=== Live action ===
Year	Title	Role	Type	Notes	Source
2001	Hōjō Tokimune	Ashikaga Ietoki (young)	TV	Taiga drama	
2002	Toshiie and Matsu	Maeda Hidetsugu (young)	TV	Taiga drama	
2025	Showtime 7	(voice)	Film		
2025	My Love Story with Yamada-kun at Lv999	Yamada (voice)	Film		
