= Rafał Jaki =

Polish executive producer and writer

- Occupations: Executive producer, writer
- Website: https://www.rjaki.com/

Rafał Jaki (Polish: [ˈra.faw ˈja.ki]) is a Polish executive producer and writer best known for his work on Cyberpunk: Edgerunners as executive producer and showrunner, and as the writer of No\Name, the first Western manga serialized in Shōnen Jump+.

== Career ==
Rafał Jaki is a graduate from University of Warsaw. Since 2012, he has specialised in business development, publishing, and creative projects. Jaki has led projects across various media, including video games, comics, and television, collaborating with companies like CD Projekt RED, Netflix, Studio Trigger, Go on Board, CMON and Dark Horse Comics.

Prior to Cyberpunk: Edgerunners, where he served as executive producer and showrunner, Jaki was the business development director at CD Projekt Red. His contributions there include co-designing the Gwent mini-game in The Witcher 3: Wild Hunt and serving as executive producer of The Witcher Adventure Game. He was the writer for the first Witcher manga, which was titled The Witcher: Ronin and was created with the Japanese artist Hataya in 2022.

== Works ==
- Gwent: The Witcher Card Game (2017, business development director)
- Cyberpunk 2077 (2012–2022, business development director)
- Cyberpunk: Edgerunners (2018–2022, showrunner and executive producer)
- The Witcher: Ronin (2022, writer)
- No\Name (2024–2025, writer)
- Brain Alive (2026–, writer)
