= Richard F. Thompson =

American scientist

- Born: September 6, 1930
- Died: September 16, 2014 (aged 84)
- Scientific career
- Fields: Behavioral neuroscience

Richard Frederick Thompson (September 6, 1930 – September 16, 2014) was an American behavioral neuroscientist. He was the William M. Keck Professor of Psychology and Biological Sciences at the University of Southern California, with a parallel appointment as professor of neurology. Thompson was known for his work on learning and memory. His graduate student, David A. McCormick discovered that the cerebellum was critical in learning and performance in classical conditioning. During his career, he served as editor-in-chief of the scientific journals Physiological Psychology, Journal of Comparative and Physiological Psychology, and Behavioral Neuroscience.

== Life and education ==
Thompson was born in Portland, Oregon and obtained a bachelor's degree in psychology from Reed College and a master's and PhD in psychology from the University of Wisconsin–Madison, before dying in Los Angeles, California.

== Publications ==
Thompson published 450 research papers, which, according to the Web of Science, have been cited nearly over 23,000 times, giving him an h-index of 80. In 1967, he authored Foundations of Physiological Psychology (New York, Harper & Row, ISBN 978-0063565227), which "revolutionized the way that behavioral neuroscience was presented and learned". His other publications included The Brain: A Neuroscience Primer (New York, W. W. Norton, ISBN 0716723387), first published in 1985.
