= Ilya Kuvshinov =

Russian illustrator (born 1990)

- Илья Кувшинов
- Born: 20 February 1990 (age 36); Penza, Russian SFSR, Soviet Union
- Occupation: Illustrator
- Known for: Ghost in the Shell: SAC 2045 (2020); The Wonderland (2019)
- Style: Manga

Ilya Kuvshinov (Russian: Илья Кувшинов; born 20 February 1990) is a Russian illustrator based in Tokyo, Japan. He created the character designs for Ghost in the Shell: SAC 2045 and The Wonderland (2019).

== Early life ==
Kuvshinov was born in Penza, Soviet Union (now Russia), where he worked in the video game industry and pursued character design on the side. Kuvshinov moved to Japan around 2015 to work full-time on anime.

== Career ==
He is popular on Instagram, where he had 2 million followers as of 2022. Dai Nippon Printing hosted a VRChat virtual exhibition of Kuvshinov's illustrations on May 2019 and PIE published an artbook of his illustrations later that year. The Japanese fashion magazine An An featured his depiction of Ghost in the Shell's Motoko Kusanagi on July 2020. He directed the music video of Cyberpunk: Edgerunners's ending theme, "Let You Down" by Dawid Podsiadło which is produced by Studio Massket on September 2022. He designed the characters for the 2024 indie game Guns Undarkness by Shoji Meguro. He will be the original character designer for the upcoming anime series Death Stranding Isolations.
