= Cyberpunk: Edgerunners =

2022 anime series

- Promotional poster

Japanese name
- Katakana: サイバーパンク: エッジランナーズ
Transcriptions
- Revised Hepburn: Saibāpanku Ejjirannāzu
- Genre: Cyberpunk
- Created by: Rafał Jaki
- Based on: Cyberpunk 2077 by CD Projekt Red
- Screenplay by: Masahiko Otsuka; Yoshiki Usa
- Story by: Bartosz Sztybor; Jan Bartkowicz; Łukasz Ludkowski
- Directed by: Hiroyuki Imaishi
- Creative director: Hiromi Wakabayashi
- Voices of: Kenn; Aoi Yūki; Hiroki Tōchi; Michiko Kaiden; Takako Honda; Wataru Takagi; Tomoyo Kurosawa
- Opening theme: "This Fffire"; by Franz Ferdinand
- Ending theme: "Let You Down"; by Dawid Podsiadło
- Composer: Akira Yamaoka
- Countries of origin: Poland; Japan
- Original languages: Japanese; English
- No. of episodes: 10

Production
- Executive producers: Rafał Jaki; Dylan Thomas; Taiki Sakurai; Yoshiki Usa
- Cinematography: Tetsuya Kawada
- Editor: Masato Yoshitake
- Running time: 23–28 minutes
- Production companies: CD Projekt Red; Trigger

Original release
- Network: Netflix
- Release: September 13, 2022

Related
- Cyberpunk: Edgerunners 2

Cyberpunk: Edgerunners (Japanese: サイバーパンク: エッジランナーズ, Hepburn: Saibāpanku Ejjirannāzu) is an original net animation (ONA) miniseries created by Rafał Jaki. It was co-produced by the Polish video game company CD Projekt Red and the Japanese animation studio Trigger, and premiered on Netflix on September 13, 2022. Set in the Cyberpunk universe created by Mike Pondsmith, the anime is a standalone tie-in to the video game Cyberpunk 2077 and takes place from 2075 to 2076. It follows David Martinez, a street kid who tries to survive in the dystopian Night City's criminal underworld by becoming an edgerunner—a cybernetically-enhanced mercenary outlaw also known as a cyberpunk.

Cyberpunk: Edgerunners received critical acclaim, with praise directed at its writing, characters, action, animation, music, and worldbuilding. The series debuted on Netflix's top ten list in its first week. Its success contributed to the reappraisal of Cyberpunk 2077, as the game saw a significant increase in sales and players following the anime's release. A standalone sequel series, Cyberpunk: Edgerunners 2, was released on October 20, 2026.

== Premise ==
Cyberpunk: Edgerunners takes place from 2075 to 2076 in Night City (NC), a self-reliant metropolis in California that suffers from obsessive cybernetic body modification, rampant gang violence, and corporate warfare exacerbated by a corrupt municipal government. The city is divided into six main districts controlled by several megacorporations, most notably Arasaka and its rival Militech.

The story follows David Martinez, a talented but financially struggling student at the prestigious Arasaka Academy. After suffering a personal tragedy, David meets and falls in love with an enigmatic young cyber hacker named Lucy, who introduces him to a gang of edgerunners—cybernetically-enhanced mercenary outlaws also known as cyberpunks—that takes jobs targeting the Arasaka Corporation. David joins the crew and finds that he has an abnormally high tolerance for cybernetic implants, and begins pushing his physical and emotional limits to protect his new family, fulfill his loved ones' dreams, and become a legend in Night City's criminal underworld.

== Characters ==
David Martinez (デイビッド・マルティネス, Deibiddo Marutinesu)
Voiced by: Kenn (Japanese); Zach Aguilar (English)
A reckless street kid and impoverished student at Arasaka Academy who, following a sudden tragedy, becomes an edgerunner with an unusually high tolerance for cyberware.
Lucyna "Lucy" Kushinada (ルーシー, Rūshī)
Voiced by: Aoi Yūki (Japanese); Emi Lo (English)
A young netrunner with a mysterious past who introduces David to the criminal underworld of Night City. She harbors a deep-seated hatred for Arasaka and dreams of escaping to the Moon.
Maine (メイン, Mein)
Voiced by: Hiroki Tōchi (Japanese); William C. Stephens (English)
The leader of a crew of edgerunners who takes David under his wing.
Dorio (ドリオ)
Voiced by: Michiko Kaiden (Japanese); Marie Westbrook (English)
Maine's girlfriend and the second-in-command of his crew.
Kiwi (キーウィ, Kīwi)
Voiced by: Takako Honda (Japanese); Stephanie Wong (English)
A stoic veteran netrunner, member of Maine's crew, and Lucy's mentor.
Pilar (ピラル, Piraru)
Voiced by: Wataru Takagi (Japanese); Ian James Corlett (English)
A foul-mouthed techie, member of Maine's crew, and Rebecca's older brother.
Rebecca (レベッカ, Rebekka)
Voiced by: Tomoyo Kurosawa (Japanese); Alex Cazares (English)
An impulsive but loyal firearms expert, member of Maine's crew, and Pilar's younger sister.
Falco (ファルコ, Faruko)
Voiced by: Yasuyuki Kase (Japanese); Matthew Mercer (English)
A nomad getaway driver who is often employed by Maine's crew.
Gloria Martinez (グロリア・マルティネス, Guroria Marutinesu)
Voiced by: Yurika Hino (Japanese); Gloria Garayua (English)
David's single mother and a paramedic who sells cyberware from corpses on the black market to pay for David's tuition at Arasaka Academy.
Ripperdoc (リパードク, Ripādoku) / "Doc"
Voiced by: Kenjiro Tsuda (Japanese); Borge Etienne (English)
A local ripperdoc who installs David's cyberware and provides him with the required immunoblockers.
Faraday (ファラデー, Faradē)
Voiced by: Kazuhiko Inoue (Japanese); Giancarlo Esposito (English)
A well-connected fixer with ties to Maine's crew and Militech who seeks to ascend the corporate ladder by joining Arasaka.
Adam Smasher (アダム・スマッシャー, Adamu Sumasshā)
Voiced by: Yukihiro Misono (Japanese); Alec Newman (English)
A legendary, fully-cybernetic supersoldier and Arasaka's ruthless head of security. His English voice actor, Alec Newman, reprises the role from Cyberpunk 2077.

== Production and release ==
Cyberpunk: Edgerunners was announced during a "Night City Wire" livestream for Cyberpunk 2077 on June 25, 2020, as a collaboration between CD Projekt and Trigger. Hiroyuki Imaishi directed the anime, with Masahiko Otsuka and Yoshiki Usa writing scripts, Yoh Yoshinari designing the characters and serving as animation director, Yuto Kaneko and Yusuke Yoshigaki serving as assistant character designers, Hiroyuki Kaneko serving as assistant director, Hiromi Wakabayashi serving as creative director, and Akira Yamaoka serving as the show's composer. The anime's opening theme is "This Fffire" by Franz Ferdinand, while its ending theme is "Let You Down" by Dawid Podsiadło. A music video for the ending theme was directed by Ilya Kuvshinov and produced by Studio Massket. Edgerunners also utilized songs from 2077's in-game radio stations. Rosa Walton's song "I Really Want to Stay at Your House" was featured prominently and critically praised. Aniplex released the series on a Blu-ray Disc set on May 28, 2025.

== Episodes ==
| No. | Title | Storyboarded by | Directed by | Screenplay by | Story by | Original release date |
|---|---|---|---|---|---|---|
| 1 | "Let You Down" | Yoshiyuki Kaneko | Yoshiyuki Kaneko | Yoshiki Usa | Bartosz Sztybor, Jan Bartkowicz, and Łukasz Ludkowski | September 13, 2022 |
In 2075, David Martinez lives in Night City with his mother Gloria, an overworked paramedic, and attends the prestigious Arasaka Academy despite their financial struggles. David illegally modifies his visor to avoid paying for an academic update and crashes the academy's system. Gloria scolds David for squandering her sacrifices and compromising her dream for him to join the Arasaka Corporation until they are caught in the crossfire of a gang drive-by shooting. The Trauma Team arrives but David and Gloria are denied first aid as they cannot afford the service, and Gloria ultimately dies of her wounds in hospital. David finds a military-grade Sandevistan spinal implant at home and discovers that Gloria had been harvesting and selling cyberware on the black market to pay for his tuition. With nothing left to lose, David has Doc, a local ripperdoc, install the Sandevistan in his body.
| 2 | "Like a Boy" | Yoshiyuki Kaneko | Yūichi Shimodaira | Yoshiki Usa and Masahiko Otsuka | Bartosz Sztybor, Jan Bartkowicz, and Łukasz Ludkowski | September 13, 2022 |
David uses the Sandevistan, which gives him bursts of super-speed, to beat his school bully Katsuo Tanaka and is expelled from the academy. Katsuo's father, Arasaka executive Mr. Tanaka, takes an interest in David's ability to use the Sandevistan without succumbing to cyberpsychosis—a mental illness caused by an overload of cyberware. David encounters a young data thief named Lucy, who agrees to take him on as a partner. After using the Sandevistan to commit a series of robberies on the metro, David collapses and Lucy brings him to Doc, who prescribes immunoblockers and warns David not to overuse his implant regardless of his unusually high tolerance. Lucy confides in David that her dream is to escape to the Moon and invites him into a braindance (BD) simulation of the Moon's surface, but this turns out to be a distraction to sell David out to a gang of edgerunners.
| 3 | "Smooth Criminal" | Akira Amemiya | Mai Ōwada | Yoshiki Usa and Masahiko Ōtsuka | Bartosz Sztybor, Jan Bartkowicz, and Łukasz Ludkowski | September 13, 2022 |
David learns that the gang's leader, Maine, was Gloria's friend who had purchased the Sandevistan from her prior to her death. Maine agrees to give David a chance to prove himself and join the crew, which consists of Lucy, Dorio, Pilar, Rebecca, Kiwi, and Falco. When a job to obtain information on Mr. Tanaka's movements by stealing navigation data from his driver Maxim Kuznetsov goes awry, David uses his Sandevistan to help him and Lucy escape from Maxim and Tyger Claw bikers. Although the gang's fixer, Faraday, chides them for the bungled heist, Maine is impressed by David's performance and officially inducts him into the crew. David receives a call from Arasaka Academy and rejects their offer to let him return.
| 4 | "Lucky You" | Yoshiyuki Kaneko | Akira Furukawa | Yoshiki Usa and Masahiko Ōtsuka | Bartosz Sztybor | September 13, 2022 |
David is mentored and assigned various tasks by the other crew members, including running errands for Pilar, target practice with Rebecca, driving lessons with Maine, combat training with Dorio, and night jogging and railway larceny with Lucy. Maine encourages David to confess his feelings for Lucy, and advises him to use his job earnings to take on more cyberware in order to level up as an edgerunner. As the gang leaves a bar one night, Pilar begins harassing a homeless man urinating on the street. The homeless man is revealed to have cyberpsychosis and kills Pilar with a concealed arm cannon. When Lucy is next targeted, David uses his Sandevistan to subdue the cyberpsycho and Maine delivers the final blow. David takes Lucy home, where she confesses that what she told him on the night they met was genuine. David promises to take Lucy to the Moon, and they kiss.
| 5 | "All Eyez on Me" | Kōdai Nakano | Kōdai Nakano | Yoshiki Usa and Masahiko Ōtsuka | Bartosz Sztybor | September 13, 2022 |
As the gang tries to find more leads on Tanaka, Kiwi learns that he secretly indulges in illicit braindances created by "JK". David recognizes the initials as the handle of Jimmy Kurosaki, a famous snuff director who provides an in-person service custom-tuning BDs for special clients. Seeing an opportunity to ambush Tanaka, the gang attempts to kidnap JK but he outwits them, captures David, and flees the scene with Lucy and Dorio in pursuit. David is subjected by JK to traumatic BDs before being rescued by Lucy and Dorio. JK agrees to help the gang set a trap for Tanaka while cautioning David that the Sandevistan will inevitably make him succumb to cyberpsychosis. Tanaka arrives and the gang captures him but JK is killed in the crossfire. The gang quickly evacuates with Tanaka while David remains troubled by JK's warning.
| 6 | "Girl on Fire" | Kai Ikarashi | Yoshiyuki Kaneko | Yoshiki Usa and Masahiko Ōtsuka | Bartosz Sztybor, Jan Bartkowicz, and Łukasz Ludkowski | September 13, 2022 |
Maine begins exhibiting signs of cyberpsychosis, including blacks outs, hallucinations and mood swings, causing him to lose control and injure Kiwi as she tries to hack into Tanaka's cyberware. Lucy takes Kiwi's place and is troubled by what she uncovers after successfully breaching Tanaka's mind. Tanaka briefly regains consciousness and pleads with David to let him go before fatally short circuiting, disabling the gang's jammer and alerting law enforcement of his death. With Trauma Team, NCPD and MaxTac forces en route, David and Lucy prepare the gang's escape vehicle while Maine and Dorio retrieve Tanaka's corpse. David turns back to help but Maine succumbs to cyberpsychosis and inadvertently kills Dorio. Realizing what he has done, Maine tells David to run and blows himself up to provide a distraction, and David returns to Lucy with Maine's cybernetic arms in his grasp.
| 7 | "Stronger" | Yoshihiro Miyajima | Tomoyuki Munehiro | Masahiko Ōtsuka | Bartosz Sztybor, Jan Bartkowicz, and Łukasz Ludkowski | September 13, 2022 |
Months later in 2076, David has assumed leadership of Maine's crew, taken on more cyberware—including Maine's arm implants—and become a renowned edgerunner, though he is unable to convince Lucy to rejoin the gang despite the two still being in a relationship. Faraday approaches David to test if he is worthy of fulfilling Maine's contract to obtain Tanaka's data, a job that is revealed to have come from Arasaka's main competitor Militech. Lucy tells David about her past as a child netrunner raised and trained by Arasaka to dive into the Old Net to recover lost data; exposure to rogue AIs and malware killed most of her peers, and Lucy was the sole survivor who managed to escape to Night City. Later that night, Lucy kills an Arasaka agent attempting to recover data about a test subject that was erased from Tanaka's records.
| 8 | "Stay" | Yoshihiro Miyajima | Yūichi Shimodaira | Masahiko Ōtsuka | Bartosz Sztybor, Jan Bartkowicz, and Łukasz Ludkowski | September 13, 2022 |
Taking on Faraday's job, David kills an Arasaka lab director but begins showing signs of cyberpsychosis when he suffers a breakdown and murders an innocent lab worker. Believing Militech to be involved, Arasaka Counterintelligence orders a hit on Faraday, who escapes but is denied protection by Militech due to his failure to obtain Tanaka's information on Arasaka's experimental Cyberskeleton project. Faraday betrays Militech and strikes a deal with Arasaka, promising to find the netrunner responsible for erasing Tanaka's data and killing their agents in exchange for a chance to join their ranks. Although David's mind continues to deteriorate, Lucy and Doc are unsuccessful in persuading him to scale back on his implants. David questions Lucy's distant demeanor but she refuses to disclose what is troubling her and heads off when she detects another Arasaka agent searching for Tanaka's erased records. This turns out to be a trap and Lucy is captured by Kiwi, who has joined Faraday.
| 9 | "Humanity" | Yoshiyuki Kaneko | Akira Furukawa | Masahiko Ōtsuka | Bartosz Sztybor, Jan Bartkowicz, and Łukasz Ludkowski | September 13, 2022 |
Faraday and Kiwi learn that Lucy intentionally killed Tanaka when she dove into his mind as she discovered that he intended to use David as a test subject for Arasaka's Cyberskeleton; Lucy erased all traces of David from Tanaka's records and has since been killing Arasaka agents attempting to recover this data. Faraday assigns David's crew a botched mission to assault an Arasaka convoy transporting the Cyberskeleton prototype, and uses the captive Lucy to blackmail David into installing it and destroying Militech's forces as a field test to demonstrate its power. Despite the massive toll the Cyberskeleton takes on his body, David tells Rebecca and Falco that they will rescue Lucy and get revenge on Faraday.
| 10 | "My Moon My Man" | Yō Yoshinari, and Sushio | Kōdai Nakano | Masahiko Ōtsuka | Bartosz Sztybor, Jan Bartkowicz, and Łukasz Ludkowski | September 13, 2022 |
A deteriorating David fights through Militech, Arasaka and MaxTac forces alongside Rebecca and Falco to reach Arasaka Tower. Faraday betrays Kiwi and has her killed as a loose end, but not before Kiwi informs David of Lucy's location. Arasaka deploys their fully-cybernetic enforcer Adam Smasher to kill David and contain the situation. David rescues Lucy but runs out of immunoblockers and begins succumbing to cyberpsychosis until Lucy kisses him, restoring his sanity. Smasher kills Faraday and Rebecca in the ensuing firefight. David tells Falco to get Lucy to safety and split the crew's reward money with her while he stays behind to hold off Smasher, who ultimately executes him. Later, Lucy fulfills her dream of traveling to the Moon but is heartbroken as David is not with her.

== Reception ==
In its first week, Cyberpunk: Edgerunners debuted on Netflix's top ten list, with 14.88 million hours of viewing. Its success helped increase sales of Cyberpunk 2077 to 20 million units.

=== Critical reception ===
Cyberpunk: Edgerunners was acclaimed by critics and fans. On the review aggregator website Rotten Tomatoes, 100% of 16 critics' reviews are positive, with an average rating of 8.8/10. The website's consensus reads: "Booting up Night City with frenetic action and awe-inspiring visual flair, Edgerunners is an exceptionally stylish anime adaptation of the world Cyberpunk established."

Jonathon Wilson wrote for Ready Steady Cut that in "many ways, this is the Cyberpunk story the Cyberpunk game wanted to tell and couldn't." Matt Kim of IGN praised the exploration of the hostile life in Night City, specifically the visual effects, noting more of the focus was on the city rather than on some of the characters, and calling it "a wild ride, but worth every blistering second". In a review for Polygon, Kambole Campbell praised the "visual language for various in-game concepts," as well as the "sonic diversity in its score" and found that the show's best aspect was "[its] ability to depict the psychological unmooring of its characters without feeling inauthentic."

Video game director Hideo Kojima lauded the series, calling it "a miracle of squeezing the trigger to the world", and compared the art and world design favorably to the 1990 OVA series Cyber City Oedo 808. Mike Pondsmith, the creator of the original Cyberpunk role-playing game also praised the show, writing "It's like seeing my brain in a big screen anime." The publisher of the tabletop Cyberpunk game, R. Talsorian, announced plans for an Edgerunners-based expansion in November 2022.

The Encyclopedia of Science Fiction described Cyberpunk: Edgerunners as an exciting and entertaining anime, despite considering its urban cyberpunk setting, early plot and characterization largely familiar. It praised Studio Trigger's animation and handling of the series' near-continuous action and violence, which it considered effective enough to overshadow many of its weaknesses. The encyclopedia criticized the ten-episode length, arguing that additional episodes could have deepened the characterization and prevented the finale, particularly the confrontation with Adam Smasher, from feeling rushed. It nevertheless highlighted David's character development, interpreting him as someone whose ambitions remain defined by the dreams of others—first his mother, then Maine and Lucy—rather than by a path of his own.

=== Accolades ===
| Year | Ceremony | Category | Result | Ref. |
|---|---|---|---|---|
| 2022 | IGN Awards | Best Anime Series | Won | |
| 2022 | The Game Awards 2022 | Best Adaptation | Nominated | |
| 2022 | 28th Manga Barcelona Awards | Best Anime Series Premiere | Nominated | |
| 2023 | 50th Annie Awards | Best Storyboarding – TV/Media (Yoshiyuki Kaneko for "Let You Down") | Nominated | |
| 2023 | 9th Anime Trending Awards | Sci-Fi or Mecha Anime of the Year | Won | |
| 2023 | 9th Anime Trending Awards | Best in Original Screenplay (Masahiko Otsuka and Yoshiki Usa) | Won | |
| 2023 | 7th Crunchyroll Anime Awards | Anime of the Year | Won | |
| 2023 | 7th Crunchyroll Anime Awards | Best Main Character (David Martinez) | Nominated | |
| 2023 | 7th Crunchyroll Anime Awards | Best Supporting Character (Rebecca) | Nominated | |
| 2023 | 7th Crunchyroll Anime Awards | Best Animation | Nominated | |
| 2023 | 7th Crunchyroll Anime Awards | Best Director (Hiroyuki Imaishi) | Nominated | |
| 2023 | 7th Crunchyroll Anime Awards | Best Character Design (Yoh Yoshinari) | Nominated | |
| 2023 | 7th Crunchyroll Anime Awards | Best Action | Nominated | |
| 2023 | 7th Crunchyroll Anime Awards | Best Drama | Nominated | |
| 2023 | 7th Crunchyroll Anime Awards | Best New Series | Nominated | |
| 2023 | 7th Crunchyroll Anime Awards | Best Score (Akira Yamaoka) | Nominated | |
| 2023 | 7th Crunchyroll Anime Awards | Best Opening Sequence ("This Fffire") | Nominated | |
| 2023 | 7th Crunchyroll Anime Awards | Best Voice Artist Performance (English) (Zach Aguilar as David Martinez) | Won | |
| 2023 | 7th Crunchyroll Anime Awards | Best Voice Artist Performance (French) (Dorothée Pousséo as Lucy) | Nominated | |
| 2023 | Japan Expo Awards | Daruma for Best Anime | Won | |
| 2023 | Japan Expo Awards | Daruma for Best Director | Won | |
| 2023 | Japan Expo Awards | Daruma for Best Action Anime | Won | |
| 2023 | Japan Expo Awards | Daruma for Best Original Soundtrack | Nominated | |
| 2023 | Japan Expo Awards | Daruma for Best Opening ("This Fffire") | Nominated | |
| 2023 | 13th Newtype Anime Awards | Best Soundtrack (Akira Yamaoka) | 4th place | |

== Sequel ==
In an October 2022 interview with Famitsu, CDPR community manager Satoru Honma said that no plans exist for a second season of Cyberpunk: Edgerunners but that if ever there would be, it would not be a continuation of the first season but "something completely different."

On September 19, 2024, Netflix released a short teaser for a new tie-in with Cyberpunk 2077. This followed rumors about a Cyberpunk: Edgerunners sequel and CD Projekt Red joint CEO Michał Nowakowski signaling plans for more animated tie-ins.

CD Projekt Red announced in July 2025 that a standalone sequel series, Cyberpunk: Edgerunners 2, was in development, with most of the original creative team returning, and would also stream Netflix. The sequel featured a new story separate from the first series while also introducing a new cast of characters. Kai Ikarashi directed the series with Bartosz Sztybor serving as writer, producer, and showrunner, Ichigo Kanno as a character designer, and Masahiko Otsuka returning as scriptwriter. Edgerunners 2 was released on October 20, 2026.

== Other media ==
A prequel manga series by Asano, titled Cyberpunk: Edgerunners Madness (サイバーパンク: エッジランナーズ MADNESS, Saibāpanku Edjirannāzu Maddonesu), debuted on Kadokawa's Comic Alive+ website on December 13, 2024. Dark Horse Comics will publish the manga in English in paperback format in North America.

In July 2024, a collaboration between Cyberpunk: Edgerunners and Guilty Gear Strive was announced. On August 21, 2025, Lucy was added as a playable character. Color palettes based on David and Rebecca for existing Guilty Gear Strive characters were also added alongside avatars and music from Cyberpunk 2077.

In April 2026, Kuro Games announced a collaboration event between Cyberpunk: Edgerunners and Wuthering Waves, which ran from June 8 to July 9 of the same year, with Lucy and Rebecca featured as playable characters. Despite the collaboration's storyline taking place after the series, most of its events are not officially considered canon to the Cyberpunk universe.

In July 2026, a collaboration between Cyberpunk: Edgerunners and Apex Legends was announced. On July 14, 2026, playable skins of existing Apex Legends characters dressed as David, Lucy, and Rebecca were added, alongside V, Panam Palmer, Royce, and Lizzy Wizzy from Cyberpunk 2077.

In September 2026, a collaboration between Cyberpunk: Edgerunners and Fortnite was announced. Lucy was added as a playable skin on September 19, 2026, available for purchase in Fortnite's item shop.

On September 13, 2026, during BlizzCon 2026, it was announced that Cyberpunk: Edgerunners and Cyberpunk: Edgerunners 2 would be collaborating with Overwatch in 2027.
