= Engram (neuropsychology) =

Conjectured means by which memories are stored

An engram is a unit of cognitive information imprinted in a physical substance, theorized to be the means by which memories are stored as biophysical or biochemical changes in the brain or other biological tissue, in response to external stimuli.

Demonstrating the existence of, and the exact mechanism and location of, neurologically defined engrams has been a focus of persistent research for many decades. Moreover, contemporary philosophical debates keep exploring the aspects of engrams that remain unexplained.

== History ==
The term "engram" (or "mnemic traces") was coined in 1904 by memory researcher Richard Semon in reference to the physical substrate of memory in the organism. Semon warned, however: "In animals, during the evolutionary process, one organic system—the nervous system—has become specialised for the reception and transmission of stimuli. No monopoly of this function by the nervous system, however, can be deduced from this specialisation, not even in its highest state of evolution, as in Man." One of the first ventures on identifying the location of a memory in the brain was undertaken by Karl S. Lashley in the 1920s, who removed portions of the brain in rodents. In Lashley's experiments, rats were trained to run through a maze and then tissue was removed from their cerebral cortex. Increasing the amount of tissue removed increased the degradation of memory, but more remarkably, where the tissue was removed from made no difference. His search thus proved unsuccessful, and his conclusion – that memory is diffusely distributed in the brain – became widely influential. However, today we appreciate that memory is not completely but only largely distributed in the brain; this, together with its dynamic nature, makes engrams challenging to identify, or prove that they exist, using traditional scientific methods.

Later in 1984, David A. McCormick and Richard F. Thompson sought the engram in the cerebellum, rather than the cerebral cortex. They used classical conditioning of the eyelid response in rabbits in search of the engram. They puffed air upon the cornea of the eye and paired it with a tone. After a number of experiences associating it with a tone, the rabbits became conditioned to blink when they heard the tone even without a puff. One region that David A. McCormick studied was the lateral interpositus nucleus (LIP). He found that recordings of neurons in this nucleus revealed activity that mirrored the learning, stimulation of the nucleus elicited the learned response, and lesion of this brain region abolished the response. Other members of the Thompson group found that when the interpositus nucleus was deactivated chemically, the conditioned response disappeared; when re-activated, they responded again, demonstrating that the LIP is a key element of the engram for this response. This approach, targeting the cerebellum, though successful, examines only basic, automatic responses, which virtually all animals possess.

== Overview ==
Neuroscience acknowledges the existence of many types of memory and their physical location within the brain is likely to be dependent on the respective system mediating the encoding of this memory. Such brain parts as the cerebellum, striatum, cerebral cortex, hippocampus, and amygdala are thought to play an important role in memory. For example, the hippocampus is believed to be involved in spatial and declarative memory, as well as consolidating short-term into long-term memory.

Studies have shown that declarative memories move between the limbic system, deep within the brain, and the outer, cortical regions. These are distinct from the mechanisms of the more primitive cerebellum, which dominates in the blinking response and receives the input of auditory information directly. It does not need to "reach out" to other brain structures for assistance in forming some memories of simple association.

An MIT study found that behavior based on high-level cognition, such as the expression of a specific memory, can be generated in a mammal by highly specific physical activation of a specific small subpopulation of brain cells. By reactivating these cells by physical means in mice, such as shining light on neurons affected by optogenetics, a long-term fear-related memory appears to be recalled.

Another study used optogenetics and chemogenetics to control neuronal activity in animals encoding and recalling the memory of a spatial context to investigate how the brain determines the lifetime of memories. The results found by the researchers have defined a role for specific hippocampal inhibitory cells (somatostatin expressing cells) in restricting the number of neurons involved in the storage of spatial information and limiting the duration of the associated memory.

In 2016, an MIT study found that memory loss in early stages of Alzheimer's disease could be reversed by strengthening specific memory engram cell connections in the brains of Alzheimer mouse models.

== See also ==
- Multiple trace theory
- Samskara
- TetTag mice, used for memory recall by optogenetic stimulation
