= David A. McCormick =

American neurobiologist

- Born: March 8, 1958 (age 68)

Academic background
- Education: BA, BSc, Mathematics and Physiological Psychology, 1979, Purdue University; Ph.D., Neuroscience, 1983, Stanford University
- Thesis: Cerebellum: essential involvement in a simple learned response (1983)

Academic work
- Institutions: University of Oregon; Yale University

David Alan McCormick is an American neurobiologist. He holds one of two Presidential Chair positions and is director of the Institute of Neuroscience at the University of Oregon and co-director of the Neurons to Minds Cluster of Excellence.

== Early life and education ==
McCormick completed his joint Bachelor of Arts and Bachelor of Science degrees in Mathematics and Physiological Psychology at Purdue University before enrolling at Stanford University for his PhD in Neuroscience.

== Career ==
=== Yale University ===
Following his PhD, McCormick became a research assistant and postdoctoral fellow at Stanford before accepting an assistant professor position in the Department of Neurobiology at Yale University. He was eventually promoted to the rank of full professor in 1994 and served as director of graduate studies in Neurobiology from 1994 to 1999. As a graduate student at Stanford University, McCormick discovered that the cerebellum was essential for Classical Conditioning of learned movements. His work formed the basis for understanding the neural mechanisms of Pavlovian conditioned responses. In 1984 he was awarded the Donald B. Lindsley Prize for this research. As a professor at Yale University School of Medicine, McCormick studied the function of the cerebral cortex and thalamus including the neural mechanisms of activity generation during sleep and epilepsy, and how neuromodulators control sleep, waking, and arousal. He was subsequently awarded the Senator Jacob Javits Award by the National Institute of Neurological Disorders and Stroke for his research. Following this award, McCormick's laboratory discovered that "intracortical synaptic communication operates through both an analog and digital mode." As such, he began investigating the mechanisms by which axons and synapses may operate in this regime. McCormick also conducted studies of the thalamus and in sleep and consciousness. In 2008, McCormick was appointed the Dorys McConnell Duberg Professor of Neurobiology. Following his promotion, McCormick found that when one introduces slow oscillation signals into brain tissue, it creates a feedback loop as the changes in electrical field guide neural activity. The McCormick laboratory revealed the neural mechanisms of the Yerkes-Dodson Curve, which posits that there is an optimal level of arousal or attention for performance.

In recognition of his neuroscience research, McCormick was elected a Fellow of the American Association for the Advancement of Science and American Academy of Arts and Sciences. Later, McCormick was one of four Yale faculty members elected to the National Academy of Medicine in 2015. He was specifically recognized for his work in the cellular and network mechanisms of the brain. In 2016, McCormick was recognized by the Connecticut Academy of Science and Engineering and received the Javits Award for the second time.

=== University of Oregon ===
McCormick left Yale University in 2017 to become the director of the Institute of Neuroscience at the University of Oregon and co-director of the Neurons to Minds Cluster of Excellence. In 2020, McCormick started teaching Happiness: a Neuroscience and Psychology Perspective which has become one of the largest and most popular elective classes at the university.

== Personal life ==
McCormick is married and has two children.

== Selected publications ==
- Thalamus: Vol. 1. Organization and Function
- Electrophysiology of the Neuron: An Interactive Tutorial
- Thalamus: Vol. 2. Experimental and Clinical Aspects (co-editor)
