= Bartosz Sztybor =

Polish cartoonist

Bartosz Sztybor

Bartosz Sztybor (born January 15, 1986 in Warsaw) is a Polish journalist, commentator, film and comics critic, and comic book writer. He is a multiple-time winner of the short-form comic competition held at the International Festival of Comics and Games in Łódź. His work has appeared in various publications, including Ozon, Wprost, Esensja, Chichot, Machina, and Cinema, as well as in various comic-related periodicals and fanzines. In 2023, the comic book Cyberpunk 2077: Big City Dreams, for which he wrote the script, received a Hugo Award in the category of Best Graphic Story or Comic.

== Works ==
=== Comics ===
Script:

==== Standalone graphic novels ====
- Byle do piątku trzynastego (2012)
- Captain Mineta – 1 (2012)
- Captain Mineta – 2 (2012)
- Captain Mineta – 10th Anniversary Edition (2013)
- Captain Mineta – 3 (2013)
- Captain Mineta – 4 (2013)
- Captain Mineta – 5 (2015)
- Captain Mineta – 6 (2016)
- Captain Mineta – OmniPUSS (2016)
- Come Back to Me, Once More (2016)
- Cyberpunk 2077 – 3 – Where's Johnny? (Polish edition: 2022)
- Cyberpunk 2077 – 4 – Big City Dreams (Polish edition: 2022)
- Cyberpunk 2077 – 5 – You Have My Word (Polish edition: 2023)
- Cyberpunk Edgerunners: Madness – 1 (Polish edition: 2025)
- If You Do It Now, What Happens Next? (2021)
- In the Treetops – 1 – There’s No Place Like an Oak (2017)
- In the Treetops – 2 – There Will Yet Be a Forest to Rest In (2017)
- It's Not About That (2013)
- Mr. Pinon’s Mysterious Hat (2021)
- Plunk (2017)
- Que de la gueule (2020)
- Quite a Commotion, Drapak! – 1 – Play It Again (2015)
- Quite a Commotion, Drapak! – 2 – The Headland of Fear (2016)
- Quite a Commotion, Drapak! – 3 – Invasion of the Hunter from the Heavens (2018)
- Rufus – 1 – A Wolf in Sheep’s Clothing (2018)
- Tainted (2010)
- The Caretaker – Not All That Glitters (2018)
- The Esteemed One (2008)
- The Perun Pack (2016)
- The Treasure (2017)
- The Witcher – 5 – Fading Memories (Polish edition: 2021)
- The Witcher – 6 – Witch’s Lament (Polish edition: 2022)
- The Witcher – 7 – The Ballad of Two Wolves (Polish edition: 2023)
- Total Massacre – 1 – Because Gagata Was Hungry (2019)
- Uncle Andrzej and the LETTERS (2016)

==== Scripts in anthologies, supplements to comics by other authors, and comic magazines ====
- "Anthology in Tribute to Tadeusz Baranowski" (2009)
- "B5 – Comic Magazine" #3 (2007)
- "Copyright – Comics Anthology" (2007)
- "Hardkorporacja" #2 (2008)
- "Hardkorporacja" #3 (2008)
- "Hardkorporacja" #4 (2009)
- "Jeju" (magazine) #5 (2007)
- "Jeju" #6 (2008)
- "Jeju" #7 – Forest and Nature in Comics (2008)
- "Jeju" #8 – Women in Comics (2009)
- "Karton" #1 (2009)
- "Kolektyw" #4 – The Four Horsemen (2009)
- "Kolektyw" #5 – The Game (2009)
- "Kolektyw" #6 – The Monster (2010)
- "Likwidator Anthology" #2 (2007)
- "Maszin" #1 – Birds (2006)
- "Maszin" #2 – Detective (2007)
- "Maszin" #3 – The Shop (2008)
- Maszin #4 Buttons (2008)
- Maszin #5 Rain (2009)
- MFK 2007 Anthology (Tytus's 50th Birthday) (2007)
- MFK Anthology 2007 – Competition Exhibition Catalog (2007)
- MFK Anthology 2008 – Competition Exhibition Catalog (2008)
- MFK Anthology 2009 – Competition Exhibition Catalog (2009)
- Mutating Portfolio (2007)
- Pirate #1 (2008)
- Ziniol – Comics Culture Quarterly #1 (2008)
- Ziniol – Comics Culture Quarterly #2 (2008)
- Ziniol – Comics Culture Quarterly #3 (2008)
- Ziniol – Comics Culture Quarterly #4 (2009)
- [fo:pa] – Literary and Philosophical Quarterly #12 (2007)

==== Drawings ====
- Flies (2009)

=== Children’s Books ===
- The Little Manipulator (2019)
- The Blue Riding Hood (2016)
- Vertical and Horizontal (2021)

=== Filmography ===
==== Film ====
- Nothing to Keep Quiet About (2007) – producer
- enh (2004) – screenplay, director
- Beautiful People (2003) – screenplay, director
- Mr. Automobile and the Knights Templar (2023) – screenplay

==== Television ====
- Cyberpunk: Edgerunners (2022) – story
- Cyberpunk: Edgerunners 2 (2026) – showrunner, writer

== Awards ==
At the International Festival of Comics and Games in Łódź, he received:

- 2007

2nd prize in the "Debutants" category – script by Bartosz Sztybor, art by Maciej Wódz – "Niewolny"

- 2008

1st prize in the "Debutants" category – script by Bartosz Sztybor, art by Karol Barski – "Łańcuchy pokarmowe terenów zalesionych"
3rd prize in the "Professionals" category – script by Bartosz Sztybor, art by Piotr Nowacki and Sebastian Skrobol – "Szóstego dnia"

- 2009

1st prize – script by Bartosz Sztybor, art by Andrij Tkalenko – "Beneath the Sky"
3rd prize – script by Bartosz Sztybor, art by Sebastian Skrobol – "Fajerwerki"
Honorable mention – script by Bartosz Sztybor, art by Artur Sadłos – "Stella"

- 2010

3rd Prize – Bartosz Sztybor (script) and Sebastian Skrobol (art) – Oby się nie powtórzył ("May It Not Happen Again")
Honorable Mention – Bartosz Sztybor (script) and Tomasz Zych (art) – Kryminał w siedmiu aktach ("A Crime Story in Seven Acts")

- 2016

Grand Prix – Bartosz Sztybor (script) and Bartek Glaza (art) – Coś pękło ("Something Broke")

- 2018

Grand Prix – Bartosz Sztybor (script) and Henryk Glaza (art) – Nos ("The Nose")
Honorable Mention – Bartosz Sztybor (script) and Minjung Kang (art) – There’s no sweetness in chilli

At the Hugo Awards, he received:

- 2023

Best Graphic Story or Comic – Bartosz Sztybor (script), Filipe Andrade and Alessio Fioriniello (art) – Cyberpunk 2077: Big City Dreams
