= V (Cyberpunk 2077) =

Protagonist of Cyberpunk 2077

- The male (left) and female (right) versions of V in promotional material for Cyberpunk 2077
- First appearance: Cyberpunk 2077
- Created by: CD Projekt Red
- Voiced by: Gavin Drea (male); Cherami Leigh (female)

In-universe information
- Full name: Vincent (male); Valerie (female)
- Origin: Night City, California
- Nationality: American

V is a customizable character and the playable protagonist of the 2020 action role-playing game Cyberpunk 2077, developed by the Polish video game company CD Projekt Red and set in the Cyberpunk universe created by Mike Pondsmith. The male version of V is named Vincent and voiced by Irish actor Gavin Drea, while the female version of V is named Valerie and voiced by American actress Cherami Leigh.

V is an edgerunner—a cybernetically-enhanced mercenary outlaw also known as a cyberpunk—whose gender, voice, appearance, body modifications, and background (Nomad, Streetkid, or Corpo) are chosen by the player and have an impact on the narrative. In the game, V is reluctantly imbued with an experimental "biochip" containing the engram of legendary rocker-turned-terrorist Johnny Silverhand (Keanu Reeves). As Johnny's consciousness begins overwriting V's own, the two must work together to separate from each other and save V's life by confronting the Arasaka Corporation, a powerful megacorporation acting as the de facto ruler of the dystopian metropolis Night City.

V has been positively received for their flexible characterization and the way their characteristics can be shaped through player-driven decisions. However, some of the customization and gender options were criticized for being restrictive despite the game's transhumanist themes. V also became associated with Internet memes during the game's launch-period glitches, consisting of mods that show a distorted third-person model.

== Representation ==
During the development of Cyberpunk 2077, CD Projekt Red decided to treat both the male and female versions of V as equally valid portrayals of the character. The game's lead quest designer, Błażej Augustynek, said the studio had approached an idea where quest designers were encouraged to think of V as female, while writers believed it was male. Augustynek said he personally viewed V as female, while other team members interpreted the character differently. The goal was set to avoid presenting either version of V as the default, so players could define V for themselves. Narrative director Philipp Weber said that this approach contrasted with the studio's work on The Witcher series titles, which were built around the established protagonist Geralt of Rivia. Because Cyberpunk 2077 featured a customizable protagonist who could also be female, the development team intentionally referred to V as female in quest design documents to reinforce that V was not meant to be written like Geralt, with Cyberpunk 2077 allowing players to alter the way V is depicted by their own preferences within the setting of the game.

According to creative director Igor Sarzynski, for V, the first-person perspective was chosen to present the narrative from an intimate and internal point of view, allowing the player to experience events directly through V's eyes rather than observing them externally. It was also viewed as well-fitting for player-driven avatars like V, whereas the third-person perspective was better suited to characters like Geralt, Kratos, and Ellie, having a more defined and fixed identity, where the player observes things differently. Cyberpunk 2077 also allows players to customize V's appearance extensively, even sexual organs, and features romance options for V to expand on their love life. Although the game initially does not reveal the real name of V, a mission named "Automatic Love" confirms male V's name as Vincent and female V's name as Valerie. Male V is voiced by Gavin Drea, and female V is voiced by Cherami Leigh. Both male and female V are 27 years old with the same birth date.

During the voice recording sessions for the male and female versions of V, Drea and Leigh were separated and rarely heard each other's voices so they would not imitate one another and could shape their own interpretations of V. According to the team at CD Projekt Red, role-playing games with gender-optional protagonist often try to match the female protagonist voice with its male counterpart as closely as possible, so they wanted to be different from them and chose this approach. In the pre-launch marketing of Cyberpunk 2077, the male version of V was the main face of the game, dominating its early marketing, making that version of V the one most associated with the game before release. Since then and particularly for the Phantom Liberty DLC expansion, female V took on a more central role in marketing. This change aimed to balance representation between both versions of the character, reflecting the view that V was meant to represent the player rather than a fixed protagonist. Additionally, in 2024, female V was prioritized and chosen for the Fortnite collaboration over male V.

== Synopsis ==
In Cyberpunk 2077, the player's chosen "Lifepath"—Nomad, Streetkid, or Corpo—determines V's background and the game's opening sequence, each leading to V operating as a mercenary in Night City. V, their friend Jackie Welles, and netrunner T-Bug are hired by fixer Dexter "Dex" DeShawn to steal an experimental biochip called "the Relic" from the Arasaka Corporation. The heist goes awry when they witness Yorinobu Arasaka murder his father Saburo to take control of the company. During their escape, T-Bug and Jackie are killed while the Relic's case is damaged, forcing V to slot the chip into their head. Although V is betrayed and shot by Dex, they are revived by the Relic and rescued by Saburo's bodyguard, Goro Takemura. V learns that the Relic contains the digitized engram of deceased rocker-turned-terrorist Johnny Silverhand and is slowly overwriting their mind with Johnny's consciousness, leaving them with a limited time to live.

Although V and Johnny are initially hostile towards each other, the two gradually form a deep connection as Johnny resolves to help V search for a cure, which makes up the game's main story. V tracks down Anders Hellman, the creator of the Relic, and Evelyn Parker, who commissioned the heist; though Hellman is unable to help, V learns that Evelyn was hired to steal the Relic by the Voodoo Boys, a gang that wanted Johnny's engram to breach the Blackwall, a firewall that protects the world from rogue AIs. V communicates with Alt Cunningham, Johnny's ex-girlfriend who became an AI beyond the Blackwall, and strikes a deal: if V helps her gain access to Arasaka's data fortress Mikoshi, Alt will separate V and Johnny. Separately, V and Takemura capture Yorinobu's sister Hanako to prove that he killed Saburo, and Hanako offers to help V in exchange for their assistance in ousting Yorinobu.

The gigs, side jobs and quests that V accepts and completes increase their reputation and "street cred" in Night City's criminal underworld. Throughout the game, V comes into contact with and is supported by several major characters, including ripperdoc Viktor "Vik" Vector, esoterica owner Misty Olzewski, renowned fixer Rogue Amendiares, and Aldecaldos nomad leader Saul Bright. If chosen by the player, V can form romantic relationships with braindance editor Judy Álvarez, renegade Aldecaldo Panam Palmer, police detective River Ward, and Johnny's former bandmate Kerry Eurodyne.

The Phantom Liberty DLC expansion features a new quest line in which V is contacted by netrunner Song "Songbird" So Mi with the promise of a cure in exchange for their help rescuing New United States of America (NUSA) President Rosalind Myers, whose aircraft has crashed in the lawless district of Dogtown. V manages to save Myers but Songbird is captured by warlord Kurt Hansen, forcing V to ally with NUSA sleeper agents Solomon "Sol" Reed and Alena "Alex" Xenakis. V learns that Songbird's mind is slowly being corrupted by rogue AIs as Myers has been forcing her to probe the Blackwall; Songbird orchestrated the plane crash as Hansen has a device called the Neural Matrix that can cure her and V's conditions. V is given the choice to help Songbird escape from Myers' clutches, or betray her to Reed in exchange for the cure. If the latter is chosen, one possible ending for the game is unlocked wherein the NUSA successfully removes the Relic at the cost of V entering a two-year coma and no longer being able to use cyberware.

In the game's final act, V becomes a legend in Night City's criminal underworld, assaults Arasaka Tower and defeats their forces, including their fully-cybernetic enforcer Adam Smasher. The attack can be carried out solo, with Rogue (Johnny takes control of V's body in this scenario), or with the Aldecaldos. The game's conclusion varies based on the player's decisions. If V accepts Hanako's offer, Yorinobu is ousted and Arasaka destroys the Relic, though V's condition remains terminal as the biochip's effects are irreversible. V is then given the choice to either live out their remaining days, or sign a contract with Arasaka and upload their own engram to Mikoshi awaiting a new body. If Hanako's offer is rejected, other possible endings include V replacing Rogue as the owner of the legendary Afterlife nightclub and accepting a high-stakes contract from the mysterious Mr. Blue Eyes in exchange for a potential cure; leaving Night City with the Aldecaldos in search of another way to save their life; or allowing Johnny to permanently take control of their body while they join Alt as an engram beyond the Blackwall, with Johnny leaving Night City afterwards to start anew.

== Critical reception ==
Hayes Madsen of GamesRadar+ classified V as a more flexible protagonist than Geralt from The Witcher 3: Wild Hunt, given the character's player-driven nature. He praised Cyberpunk 2077's Lifepath system, saying that the Nomad, Street Kid, and Corpo backgrounds influenced how players viewed V's place in Night City, affecting dialogue, relationships, and characterization across the game. Madsen also observed that the first-person perspective was an essential aspect for V's portrayal, making the story feel more direct and improving the link between the player and the character. He discussed V's connection with Johnny Silverhand and quests such as "Sinnerman" for allowing players to shape V's morality and personal beliefs through intimate choices instead of major plot decisions, and lauding the game's progression and skill systems for helping players shape V through different combat and hacking styles.

Harvey Randall of PC Gamer praised V's portrayal in Cyberpunk 2077 for presenting the character as socially awkward and less idealized than a typical suave RPG protagonist. Randall noted that V's romance interactions often relied on clumsy humor, awkward flirting, and uncomfortable text exchanges, which he argued made the character feel more believable and relatable. He singled out V's relationships with characters such as Panam Palmer, River Ward, and Goro Takemura, arguing that awkwardness occurring during their interactions made them feel genuine and that these moments reveal V as emotionally vulnerable beneath the violence of Night City. He further described the romances as giving the story quieter and more personal moments, defining V as much through personal conversations as through the main plot.

Matteo Lupetti of Gayming Magazine criticized V's customization system and handling of gender identity, reasoning that it still treated gender too rigidly despite the game's transhumanist setting. Writing from a non-binary perspective, Lupetti stated that while the game allowed players to customize V's body type, voice, and genitalia independently, the character remained constrained by traditionally masculine and feminine body models, gendered hairstyles, and limited customization options. He particularly criticized the game for tying pronouns to V's voice selection and argued that the inclusion of genital customization was largely cosmetic rather than meaningful to role-playing. Lupetti contended that V's customization system only partially explored cyberpunk themes of identity and bodily autonomy, limiting the player's ability to create a more convincingly non-binary version of the character and associated these criticisms with controversies surrounding the game's marketing and depiction of transgender imagery. Conversely, there has been controversy within the Cyberpunk 2077 community, where fans have criticized the perceived bias towards female V receiving more representation than male V, noticed by media outlets including Eurogamer, ComicBook.com, and Rock Paper Shotgun.

Following the release of Cyberpunk 2077, V's unusual sleeping animation quickly turned into a meme within the game's community. Players noted that V appeared to sleep sideways across the bed, often without using the covers and with part of their body hanging off the mattress. Writing for Eurogamer, Wesley Yin-Poole humorously criticized the animation and contrasted it with V's otherwise normal sleeping behavior in other locations throughout the game. The animation gained visibility through fan artwork and memes. Similarly, a third-person camera glitch involving V became viral for its distorted visual effects. The glitch, triggered when the in-game camera became detached from its normal first-person perspective, exposed V's character model as headless, with exaggerated arm and torso animations designed for first-person gameplay becoming visibly unnatural in third-person view. Writing for PC Gamer, Christopher Livingston described the glitch as both humorous and unsettling, comparing V's stretched and distorted movements to body horror imagery. Videos of this glitch spread online, becoming one of the more notable visual glitches associated with the game's launch period.
