= MCM Comic Con London =

Multi-genre fan convention held in the London Borough of Newham twice yearly

Coordinates: 51°30′27″N 0°1′47″E

MCM London Comic Con
- MCM London Comic Con in October 2026
- Status: Active
- Genre: Speculative fiction
- Venue: ExCeL London
- Locations: One Western Gateway, Royal Victoria Dock, London Docklands, London
- Country: United Kingdom
- Inaugurated: May 2002
- Most recent: 23–25 October 2026
- Next event: 28–30 May 2027
- Attendance: 133,156 in May 2016
- Organizer: ReedPop
- Website: https://www.mcmcomiccon.com/london/en-us/home.html

The MCM Comic Con London (formerly known as the London Movies, Comics, and Media Expo, London MCM Expo, and MCM London Comic Con) is a speculative fiction fan convention held at ExCel London twice yearly since 2002, usually on the last weekend in May and October. The convention primarily focuses on comic books, films, TV shows, video games, sci-fi, fantasy, cosplay, anime, manga and other popular media.

== History ==
The London Movies, Comics, and Media Expo was founded in early 2001 by Paul Miley (ScifiShows) and Bryan Cooney (Wolf Events).

The convention is held twice each year, usually on the last full weekend of May and October. There have occasionally been exceptions to this, such as May 2009.

The first event was over two days; Saturday 18th and Sunday 19th May 2002. In 2003 the Expo expanded to two events per year; one in May and another in October. In 2010 the event expanded to three days attracting attendance and involvement of representatives from Universal Studios, Twentieth Century Fox, MVM Entertainment, Manga Entertainment, All the Anime, Marvel Comics, and NEO magazine.

The Movie Comic Media (MCM) Expo Group organises the London, Birmingham, the Midlands, Ireland, Northern Ireland, Belfast, Manchester, Liverpool, Scotland, Stockholm, Malmö, Copenhagen, Belgium, and Hannover MCM Comic Cons. On 23 October 2017, ReedPop acquired MCM and all of its events throughout the UK.

Due to the COVID-19 pandemic, the October 2020 MCM London Comic Con was cancelled. It returned on 22–24 October 2021 with new safety measures in place.

== Show features ==
=== Exhibit hall ===
The MCM London Comic Con has a large floor-space for dealer stands and exhibitors, which include media companies such as film studios and TV stations. There is also a theatre space that includes a large stage with projection monitors on either side and seating for approximately 1,000 people.

=== Guests ===
Guests from popular media are commonly invited to the convention. They take part for a variety of reasons. Often, this is to promote their latest product or production whether it be film, TV or print. Sometimes, it can be to raise awareness and funds for a charity or cause important to them. It is common to see television and film personalities selling autographs and interacting with their fans both in person and on stage during question and answer sessions. Along with panels, seminars and workshops with comic book professionals, there are previews of upcoming television shows and feature films, and portfolio review sessions with video game companies.

=== Autographs ===
The event also includes an autograph area where high-profile guests from films, TV shows and other works of popular media sign items for the public.

=== Cosplay ===
Ticket holders are allowed, and in many cases encouraged, to take part in cosplay. Cosplaying has become one of the most popular parts of the show. This can be to show off the costumer's latest work, to show devotion to their favourite characters or fandoms, or engage in role-play with other cosplayers in the same series, as well as to meet new people with mutual interests. The show also hosts the EuroCosplay championships, which take place every October with one of the UK qualifying entries being decided at the May event.

=== Comic Village ===
Comic Village was an area of the show that was co-ordinated by Gary "Wheels" Howe, a member of the MCM Expo Group. This area had approximately 200 tables, where amateur as well as professional artists, writers and publishers sold their comics, as well as prints. It also had a signing area where big names in the comic industry meet and sign items for members of the public. Previous guests have included Gail Simone, Kevin Eastman, Frazer Irving and Antony Johnston.

=== MCM Fringe Festival ===
In 2010, the MCM Fringe Festival was revamped and given a new logo. The main purpose of Fringe is to allow cosplayers to organise photoshoots, meet-ups, picnics and get-togethers. Organisers are more easily able to create their own event within the Expo and broadcast it. At the same time, the rest of the Expo attenders can search the website and decide to go to it. Photoshoots will be more successful and likely to attract more people from the same fandom to take part. Previous events have included picnics, dances and video gaming tournaments.

=== Eagle Awards for Comics ===
The Eagle Awards were founded in 1977 and were the longest-running fan-voted awards for the comic industry. They were held at the MCM London Comic Con each May from 2010 until 2012, after which they were renamed the MCM Award in 2013. In the following year, 2014, the Eagle Award was presented under its new name – first The Stan Lee Eagle Award and then the True Believer Comic Awards – at the London Film and Comic Con. They have not been awarded since.

=== VidfestUK ===
VidfestUK is an area of the expo dedicated to online visual media, such as animations, vlogs and various web series. Notable guests include YouTube partners such as TomSka and MrWeebl.

== Location and dates ==
	Dates	Location	Attendance	Notable guests
London Movie Comic & Media Expo 2002	18-19 May 2002	ExCel London		Michelle Trachtenberg, Kristine Sutherland, Peter Williams, Richard Biggs, Walter Koenig, Alexander Siddig, Anthony Daniels, Ethan Phillips
London Movie Comic & Media Expo 2003	17-18 May 2003	ExCel London		James Doohan, Michelle Trachtenberg, Bianca Lawson, Patrick Kilpatrick, Alice Krige, Chase Masterson, Robert Picardo, Judson Scott, Walter Koenig, Glenn Shadix
London Movie Comic & Media Expo 2003	18-19 October 2003	ExCel London		Craig Parker, Billy Boyd, Jorn Benzon, Adrian Rayment, Neil Rayment, Chris Eubank, Michael Madsen, Marc Singer, Reggie Bannister, Emma Caulfield, Julie Benz, Verne Troyer, David Carradine, Dirk Benedict, Garrett Wang, Herb Jefferson, Ed Wasser, Brian Thompson, Phil Fondacaro, Chris Barrie, Erin Gray, Jerry Hardin, John Kassir, Michael Jai White, Suanne Braun
London Movie Comic & Media Expo 2004	15-16 May 2004	ExCel London		
London Movie Comic & Media Expo 2004	16-17 October 2004	ExCel London		
London Movie Comic & Media Expo 2005	14–15 May 2005	ExCel London		Teryl Rothery
London Movie Comic & Media Expo 2005	29–30 October 2005	ExCel London		
London Movie Comic & Media Expo 2006	27–28 May 2006	ExCel London		Maile Flanagan
London Movie Comic & Media Expo 2006	28–29 October 2006	ExCel London		Aaron Dismuke, Yuri Lowenthal, Tara Platt
London Movie Comic & Media Expo 2007	26–27 May 2007	ExCel London		Sonia Leong, Vic Mignogna, Spike Spencer
London Movie Comic & Media Expo 2007	20–21 October 2007	ExCel London		Laura Bailey, Johnny Yong Bosch, Colleen Clinkenbeard, Billy Tucci
London Movie Comic & Media Expo 2008	24–25 May 2008	ExCel London		Mike McFarland
London Movie Comic & Media Expo 2008	25–26 October 2008	ExCel London		Brad Swaile
London Movie Comic & Media Expo 2009	23–24 May 2009	ExCel London		
London Movie Comic & Media Expo 2009	24–25 October 2009	ExCel London		Allison Scagliotti
London Movie Comic & Media Expo 2010	29–30 May 2010	ExCel London		Masahiro Ando, Troy Baker, Svetlana Chmakova, Kyle Hebert, Sonia Leong, Yuri Lowenthal, Mike McFarland, Masahiko Minami, Tara Platt
London Movie Comic & Media Expo 2010	29–31 October 2010	ExCel London	50,000+	Glenn Morshower, Colin Ferguson, Saul Rubinek, Eddie McClintock, Joanne Kelly, Camille Coduri, Chris Gauthier, Jordan Hinson, Lucas Bryant, John de Lancie, Tony Todd, Roger Craig Smith, Michael Sinterniklaas, Stephanie Sheh, Jack Kenny, Adrian Hodges, Tim Haines, Sam Ernst, Jim Dunn
London Movie Comic & Media Expo 2011	27–29 May 2011	ExCel London	Under 60,000	Billy West, Phil LaMarr, Lauren Tom, Maurice LaMarche, Thomas Craig, Johnny Harris, Craig Olejnik
London MCM EXPO 2011	28–30 October 2011	ExCel London	62,000	Salli Richardson, Jonathon Young, Vic Mignogna, Agam Darshi, Jaime Paglia, Alexa Havins, Arlene Tur, Eve Myles, Gideon Emery, Adam Howden, Peter F. Hamilton
London MCM EXPO 2012	25–27 May 2012	ExCel London	62,000 – 70,000	Danny DeVito, Kimberly Brooks, Kevin Eastman, Raphael Sbarge, Tyler Hoechlin, Holland Roden, Stephanie Sheh, Michael Sinterniklaas, Noel Clarke, Pascale Hutton, David Giuntoli, Johannes Roberts
London MCM EXPO 2012	26–28 October 2012	ExCel London	70,000	Matt Smith, Bill Paxton, Lucas Bryant, Ali Hillis, Eric Balfour, Andrew Lee Potts, members of the production studio Rooster Teeth, members of the production studio Eddsworld, Warwick Davis
London MCM EXPO 2013	24–26 May 2013	ExCel London	76,000	Edgar Wright, Jason Flemyng, Mark Meer, Dougray Scott, Barrett Foa, Andrew Lee Potts, Hannah Spearritt, Shinichiro Watanabe, Tom Hopper, Alexander Vlahos, Camilla Luddington, Tyler Hoechlin and fellow cast members of Teen Wolf, Rob Van Dam
MCM London Comic Con 2013	25–27 October 2013	ExCel London	88,000	Kelly Hu, some members of Studio Wit, Lucas Bryant, Emily Rose, Andrew Lee Potts, Hannah Spearritt, Colin Ford, Troy Baker, Yuri Lowenthal, Tara Platt, Roger Craig Smith, Elias Toufexis, Richard Epcar, Kai Owen, Mark Lester, Ron Moody, Eddie McClintock, Thomas Jane, Alexis Cruz, Sydney White
MCM London Comic Con 2014	23–25 May 2014	ExCel London	101,600	Lyndsy Fonseca, Yoshiki, Dylan Bruce, Meghan Ory, Beverley Elliott, Seychelle Gabriel, Drew Roy, Connor Jessup, Colin Cunningham, Luciana Carro, Tamara Taylor, Greg Finley, Wendee Lee, Phil LaMarr, Greg Cipes, Christopher Daniels, Kazarian, Hideo Baba, Kazutoki Kono, Takamitsu Inoue, Atsushi Takahashi, Sarah Louise Madison, Henry Winkler, Robert Llewellyn, Shane Richie, Craig Fairbrass, John Altman, Julian Glover, Nina Wadia, James Cosmo, Scott Adkins, Nick Nevern, Jason Maza, Leonard Lies, Ian McNeice, Annette Badland, Caroline Munro
MCM London Comic Con 2014	24–26 October 2014	ExCel London		Karan Ashley, Laura Bailey, D.C. Douglas, Robin Atkin Downes, Sandy Fox, Walter E. Jones, Lex Lang, Vic Mignogna, Robert Picardo, Saul Rubinek, Austin St. John, Shinichiro Watanabe, Travis Willingham, David Yost
MCM London Comic Con 2015	22–24 May 2015	ExCel London		
MCM London Comic Con 2015	23–25 October 2015	ExCel London	130,560	Steven Moffat, Mark Gatiss, Alan Tudyk, Nolan North, Noah Wyle, Charlie Higson, Gareth Evans, Cynthia Addai-Robinson, Candice Patton, RJ Mitte, Ian McElhinney, Ian Beattie, Eugene Simon, Victor Webster, Saul Rubinek, Alexander Koch, Colin Ford, Robert Llewellyn, Danny John-Jules, Jessica DiCicco, Shigeto Koyama, Bob Layton, John McCrea, Tony Lee, The Yogscast, Rooster Teeth, The Hollywood Show (and others) and some of the cast and the crew from The Walking Dead, Humans, Da Vinci’s Demons, Thunderbirds Are Go, Beowulf: Return to the Shieldlands, Outcast, Eve, The Man in the High Castle, Mr. Robot
MCM London Comic Con 2016	27–29 May 2016	ExCel London	133,156	Warwick Davis, Sean Kelly, Daniela Ruah, Eric Christian Olsen, John Noble, Scottie Thompson, Elizabeth Henstridge, Andrew Lee Potts, Hannah Spearritt
MCM London Comic Con 2016	28–30 October 2016	ExCel London		Melissa Rauch, Kunal Nayyar, Jesse Eisenberg, Lindsay Jones, Barbara Dunkelman, Kara Eberle, Arryn Zech, Peter Davison, Michael Page
MCM London Comic Con 2017	26–28 May 2017	ExCel London		Donnie Yen, Summer Glau, John Walsh, Lou Ferrigno, Sam J. Jones, Catherine Tate, Billie Piper, Casper Crump, Manu Bennett, Echo Kellum, Victor Garber, Verne Troyer, Dave Prowse, Guy Henry, Jemma Redgrave, Tatsuma Minamikawa, Veronica Taylor
MCM London Comic Con 2017	27–29 October 2017	ExCel London		Hayley Atwell, Chris Barrie, Manu Bennett, Johnny Yong Bosch, Gareth David-Lloyd, Warwick Davis, Dan Green (voice actor), Hattie Hayridge, Robert Llewellyn, Anthony Mackie, Charles Martinet, Eric Stuart, Yoh Yoshinari
MCM London Comic Con 2018	25–27 May 2018	ExCel London		Chris Barrie, Michael Biehn, Paul Blake, Kevin Conroy, Dermot Crowley, Jim Cummings, Anthony Daniels, Felicia Day, John DiMaggio, Jess Harnell, Alan Harris, David Hayter, Ken Lashley, Sylvester McCoy, Khary Payton, Lucie Pohl, Tara Sands, April Stewart, James Arnold Taylor
MCM London Comic Con 2018	26–27 October 2018	ExCel London		Colin Baker, Chris Barrie, Dave Bautista, David Bradley, Zach Callison, Steve Cardenas, Vic Mignogna, Frank Miller, Nolan North, Sam Riegel, John Romita, Jr., Catherine Sutherland, Veronica Taylor
MCM Comic Con London 2019	24–26 May 2019	ExCel London		Stephen Amell, Troy Baker, Misha Collins, Aaron Dismuke, Ricco Fajardo, David Harbour, Jason Liebrecht, Madison Lintz, Elizabeth Maxwell, Jason Mewes, Nolan North, Brian O'Halloran, David Ramsey, Emily Bett Rickards, Lindsay Siedel, Sebastian Stan, Sarah Wiendelheft
MCM Comic Con London 2019	25–27 October 2019	ExCel London		Sophia Lillis, Jaeden Martell, Wyatt Oleff, Simon Pegg, Jason David Frank, Nakia Burrise, Catherine Sutherland, Nolan North, Troy Baker, Lindsay Jones, Charles Martinet, Tara Strong, Arryn Zech
MCM Comic Con London 2021	22–24 October 2021	ExCel London		Tom Hiddleston, Sophia Di Martino, Jonathan Majors, Charlie Cox, Ben Barnes, Anjali Bhimani, Jim Cummings, David Hayter, Carolina Ravassa, Deborah Ann Woll
MCM Comic Con London 2022	27–29 May 2022	ExCel London		Aaron Roberts, Alessandro Micelli, Alexander Roth, Alison Sampson, Armstrong I Biggs, Ashens, Asia Alfasi, Bob Hall, Bullit, CDawgVA, Charlie Biggs, Christian Ward, Claudia Bradstone, Clifford Chapin, Clive Jackson, Cyarin, Dan Fogler, Dante Basco, Dave Johnson, David Ajala, Doug Cockle, Eddache, Emma Vieceli, Erika Harlacher, Eve Smith, Francesca May, Francesca Mills, Francesco Dimitri, Gary Erskine, Gigguk, Girl in the Rain, Guy Who Does Art, Hugo Chegwin, Janet Varney, Jess Taylor, JL Straw, J.L. Worrad, J.M. Miro, Joe Pruett, Josh Winning, Joëlle Jones, Justin Briner, Kit Buss, Kit Whitfield, Kristen McGuire, Kugali, Kyle Phillips, Laura Sebastian, Lucia Keskin, Lucy Holland, Marc Ellerby, Marc Laming, Mark Silcox, Matt Wesolowski, Nigel Parkinson, Nolan North, Nori Art, Oxventure cast (Johnny Chiodini, Andy Farrant, Jane Douglas, Mike Channell, Ellen Rose and Luke Westaway), Paul Cornell, Paul Jenkins, Pauscorpi, Peter Milligan, Pypah's Art, Ram V, Robert Sheehan, Ross Marquand, Rym Kechacha, Samantha Shannon, Simon Miller, Sonia Leong, Stark Holborn, Sydsnap, The Anime Man, Tia Kofi, T.L. Huchu, Toby Regbo, TomSka, Tracy-Ann Oberman, Trina Nishimura, Warwick Johnson-Cadwell and Will Carver
MCM Comic Con London 2022	28–30 October 2022	ExCel London		Colin Baker, Troy Baker, David Bradley, Ray Chase, Anthony Daniels, Peter Davison, Robbie Daymond, Erica Durance, Todd Haberkorn, Brian Herring, Sylvester McCoy, Paul McGann, Max Mittelman, Mason Alexander Park, John Rhys-Davies, Megan Shipman, Alan Tudyk, Natalie Van Sistine, Laura Vandervoort, Cristina Vee, Tom Welling
MCM Comic Con London 2023	26–28 May 2023	ExCel London		Baldur's Gate 3 cast (Neil Roberts, Joshua Winchard, George Taylor, Ethan Reid, Beth Park, Josh Weeden, Emerald O'Hanrahan, Tilly Steele, Tina Barnes, Andrew Wincott, Scott Joseph, Harriet Kershaw, Kirsty Gilmore, Emma Gregory and Dave Jones), Rachael Lillis, Veronica Taylor, Jay Goede, Eric Stuart, Dan Green, Marta Svetek, Kellen Goff, Sarah Miller-Crews, Alison Doody, Julian Glover, Paul Freeman, Kevin McNally, Paul Blake, Danielle Bisutti, Alastair Duncan, Ryan Hurst, Sunny Suljic, Rhea Norwood, Hale Appleman, Harvey Guillén, Kayvan Novak, Eamon Farren, Bobby Breed, Alan Davis, TJ Klune, Tony Moy, Casey Parsons, Nathan Foad, Kristian Nairn, Con O’Neill, David Bradley
MCM Comic Con London 2023	27–29 October 2023	ExCel London		Critical Role cast (Matthew Mercer, Laura Bailey, Sam Riegel, Travis Willingham, Ashley Johnson, Liam O'Brien, Taliesin Jaffe and Marisha Ray), Baldur's Gate 3 cast (Amelia Tyler, Dave Jones, Devora Wilde, Emma Gregory, Jennifer English, Neil Newbon, Samantha Béart, Theo Solomon, Tim Downie and Tracy Wiles), Jeremy Adams, C. L. Clark, Doug Cockle, Steve Downes, Ashley Greene, Mark Hulmes, Kevin Maguire, James C. Mulligan, Ryan Ottley, Khary Payton, Andrew Scott, Lindsay Seidel, Jen Taylor, Aaron Dismuke, Adam McArthur, Kaiji Tang, Stephen Amell, Kayleigh McKee, Lindsay Seidel, Reagan Murdock, Ryan Colt Levy, Sarah Wiedenheft, Denise Gough, Blu Hydrangea, Felicia Day, Johnny Chiodini
MCM Comic Con London 2024	24–26 May 2024	ExCel London		Baldur's Gate 3 cast (Beth Park, Josh Weeden, Neil Roberts, George Taylor, Harriet Kershaw, Kirsty Gilmore, Tilly Steele and Andrew Wincott), Sonny Strait, Ian Sinclair, Colleen Clinkenbeard, Christopher Sabat, Luci Christian, Eric Vale, Mike McFarland, Brendan Wayne, Emily Swallow, Kaili Vernoff, Tait Fletcher, Temuera Morrison, Robbie Daymond, Patricia Summersett, Sean Chiplock, Cristina Vee, Billy Harris, Kola Bokinni, Toheeb Jimoh, Cristo Fernández, Phil Dunster, Maximilian Osinski, Kevin MacNally, Helen Quigley, Keith Page, Rob Paulsen, Jess Harnell, Jim Cummings, Roger Craig Smith, Colleen O'Shaughnessey, Ryan Bartley, Dave B. Mitchell, Maile Flanagan, Mallorie Rodak, Jordan Dash Cruz, Isi Adeola, Choriza May, Tomska, Mindy Lee, Nigel Parkinson, Stefano Caselli, James C. Mulligan
MCM Comic Con London 2024	25–27 October 2024	ExCel London		Baldur's Gate 3 cast (Neil Newbon, Jennifer English, Devora Wilde, Theo Solomon, Aliona Baranova, Tim Downie, Amelia Tyler, Tracy Wiles, Samantha Béart, Emma Gregory, Dave Jones, Andrew Wincott, Ethan Reid, Scott Joseph, Tamaryn Payne, Joshua Winchard, George Taylor and Neil Roberts), Lana Parrilla, Rebecca Mader, Sean Maguire, Mathew Baynton, Laurence Rickard, Aly Michalka, AJ Michalka, Aimee Carrero, Adewale Akinnuoye-Agbaje, Karan Ashley, Walter Jones, Billy West, Maurice LaMarche, Alex Brightman, Brandon Rogers, Sarah Natochenny, Erica Schroeder, Lisa Ortiz, Zach Tyler Eisen, Michaela Jill Murphy, James Sie, Jennie Kwan, Nolan North, Richard McGonagle, Emily Rose, Ricco Fajardo, Matt Shipman, Drew Breedlove, Jason Spisak, Natural Six cast (Harry McEntire, Ben Starr, Hollie Bennett, Alex Jordan, Doug Cockle and Aoife Wilson), Rachael Smith, Clint McElroy, Travis McElroy, TomSka, Damien Haas, Kev Bayliss, Steve Mayles, David Wise, Gregg Mayles, V.E. Schwab, Alexander Newall, Shahan Hamza, Lowri Davies, Joe Quinones, Cecil Castellucci, Sabaa Tahir, Ella Purnell, Paul Cornell, Ella McLeod, Tasha Suri, Ash Bond, Eliza Chan, Babs Tarr, Sarah Graley, Elsie Lovelock, Marc Ellerby, Eren Angiolini, Hamish Steele, Yen Ee Tay, Lee Townsend, Anna Phylactic
MCM Comic Con London 2025	23–25 May 2025	ExCel London		Aaron Dismuke, Paul Castro Jr, Steve Cardenas, Karan Ashley, Walter Jones, David Tennant, Ty Tennant, Dan Fogler, Jonathan Brugh, Patton Oswalt, Debi Derryberry, Lauren Landa, Sarah Wiedenheft, Brianna Knickerbocker, Dante Basco, Stephanie Beatriz, Blake Roman, Kimiko Glenn, Elsie Lovelock, Michelle Ang, Noshir Dalal, Meredith Salenger, Nadji Jeter, Rob Paulsen, Randy Rogel, Stanley Artgerm Lau, Kayden Phoenix, Steve Tanner, Eren Angiolini, Dennis Menheere, Tom King, Patrick Mulholland, Mark Brooks, Mitch Gerads, Andrew Lee Griffith, Chris Condon, Tyler Kirkham, Cat Hepburn, Andy Darcy Theo, Bryony Pearce, Scarlett Dunmore, Brian Dungan, Sean Gordon Murphy, Corin M Howell, Marc Laming, Lee Bradley, Cynthia So, Esmie Jikieme-Pearson, Adrian Tchaikovsky, Genevieve Cogman, V. Castro, Rachael Smith, Sarah Graley, Jacob Phillips, John Harris Dunning, David Leach, Tahereh Mafi, Beth Reekles, Grace Curtis, Josh Winning, Amy McCaw, Arantxa Castilla-La Mancha, Scarlett Harlett, Paul Fry, John J. Pearson, Alison Sampson, Hamish Steele, Alex Norris, Lee Townsend, Sunfwer, Elena Vitagliano, Alwyn Hamilton, Aliya Whiteley, Gareth L. Powell, Oliver K. Langmead, Hazel McBride
MCM Comic Con London 2025	24–26 October 2025	ExCel London		Mark Addy, Elias Toufexis, Christopher Mintz-Plasse, Zach Aguilar, Abby Trott, Emily Cass, Scott Arthur, Jon Bernthal, Troy Baker, Jennifer Hale, Mark Meer, Alix Wilton Regan, Ali Hillis, Joel Perez, Amir Talai, Krystina Alabado, Jason Griffith, Pete Capella, John Eric Bentley, Britt Baron, Bryan Dechart, Amelia Rose Blaire, Karl Urban, Laz Alonso, Tomer Capone, Karen Fukuhara, Christopher Judge, Joseph Quinn, Ian Cardoni, Harry Belden, Spencer Grammer, Martha Howe-Douglas, Laurence Rickard, Natural Six cast (Harry McEntire, Ben Starr, Hollie Bennett, Alex Jordan, Doug Cockle and Aoife Wilson), Sarah Underwood, Molly X. Chang, Marvellous Michael Anson, M.A. Kuzniar, Amy McCaw, Kevin Maguire, Emma Gregory, Rich Keeble, Elsie Lovelock, Tom McKay
MCM Comic Con London 2026	22–24 May 2026	ExCel London		Brandon Sanderson, John Burgmeier, Linda Young, Shannon Chan-Kent, Brian Drummond, Brad Swaile, Alessandro Juliani, Dylan Llewellyn, Zahra Ahmadi, Kris Marshall, Felicity Montagu, David Bateson, Jane Perry, Jason Narvy, Paul Schrier, JD Kelly, Shaun Mendum, Chloe Eves, Sarah Nightingale, Kit Harrison, Natalie Winter, Richard Horvitz, Vivian Nixon Williams, Erika Henningsen, Angela Sant' Albano, Emma Rose Creaner, Matt Lanter, James Arnold Taylor, Nika Futterman, Catherine Taber, Dee Bradley Baker, Ashley Eckstein, Dan and Zsiga, Minoru Ota, Natural Six cast (Harry McEntire, Ben Starr, Hollie Bennett, Alex Jordan, Doug Cockle and Aoife Wilson), Andrew Wincott, Rebecca Hanssen, John Romero, John Robertson, Tom McKay, Luke Dale, Adrian Bouchet, Damien Haas, Nathan Fillion, Alan Tudyk, David Hayter, Gabe Kunda, Leah Clark, Austin Tindle, Evan Call, Townsend Coleman, Rob Paulsen, Cam Clarke, Barry Gordon, Renae Jacobs, Kevin Eastman
MCM Comic Con London 2026	23–25 October 2026	ExCel London		Charles Martinet, Roger Craig Smith, Patricia Summersett, Sarah Natochenny, Robbie Daymond, AJ Beckles, Kari Wahlgren, Jim Cummings, Anjali Bhimani, Shai Matheson, Nicole Tompkins, Stephanie Panisello, Nick Apostolides, Genevieve Buechner, Eden Riegel, Lily Gao, Charlie Cox, Benjamin Byron Davis, Wilson Bethel, Vincent D'Onofrio, Bryce Pinkham, Vivienne Medrano, Richard Summers-Calvert, David Vincent, Allegra Clark, Anne Yatco, Neil Newbon, Tim Downie, Tracy Wiles, Devora Wilde, Rich Keeble, Kirsty Rider, Jennifer Svedberg-Yen, Shala Nyx, Aleks Le, Alix Wilton Regan, Shelley Blond, Georgina Leahy, Sue Elliot-Nicholls, Tamsin Heatley, Theo Stevenson, Wayne Forester, Ned Luke, Steven Ogg, Shawn Fonteno, Young Maylay, Nolan North, James Davies, Ewan Bailey, Critical Role Cast (Matthew Mercer, Laura Bailey, Ashley Johnson, Liam O'Brien, Travis Willingham, Taliesin Jaffe, Marisha Ray and Sam Riegel), Natural Six cast (Harry McEntire, Ben Starr, Hollie Bennett, Alex Jordan, Doug Cockle and Aoife Wilson), James Ortiz
MCM Comic Con London 2027	28–30 May 2027	ExCel London		Hayden Christensen, Roger Clark, Noshir Dalal, Peter Blomquist, Rob Wiethoff
MCM Comic Con London 2027	22–24 October 2027	ExCel London		

== See also ==
- List of multigenre conventions
- London Film and Comic Con
- Hyper Japan
- Fandom
