= Alex Jordan =

English actor (born 1990)

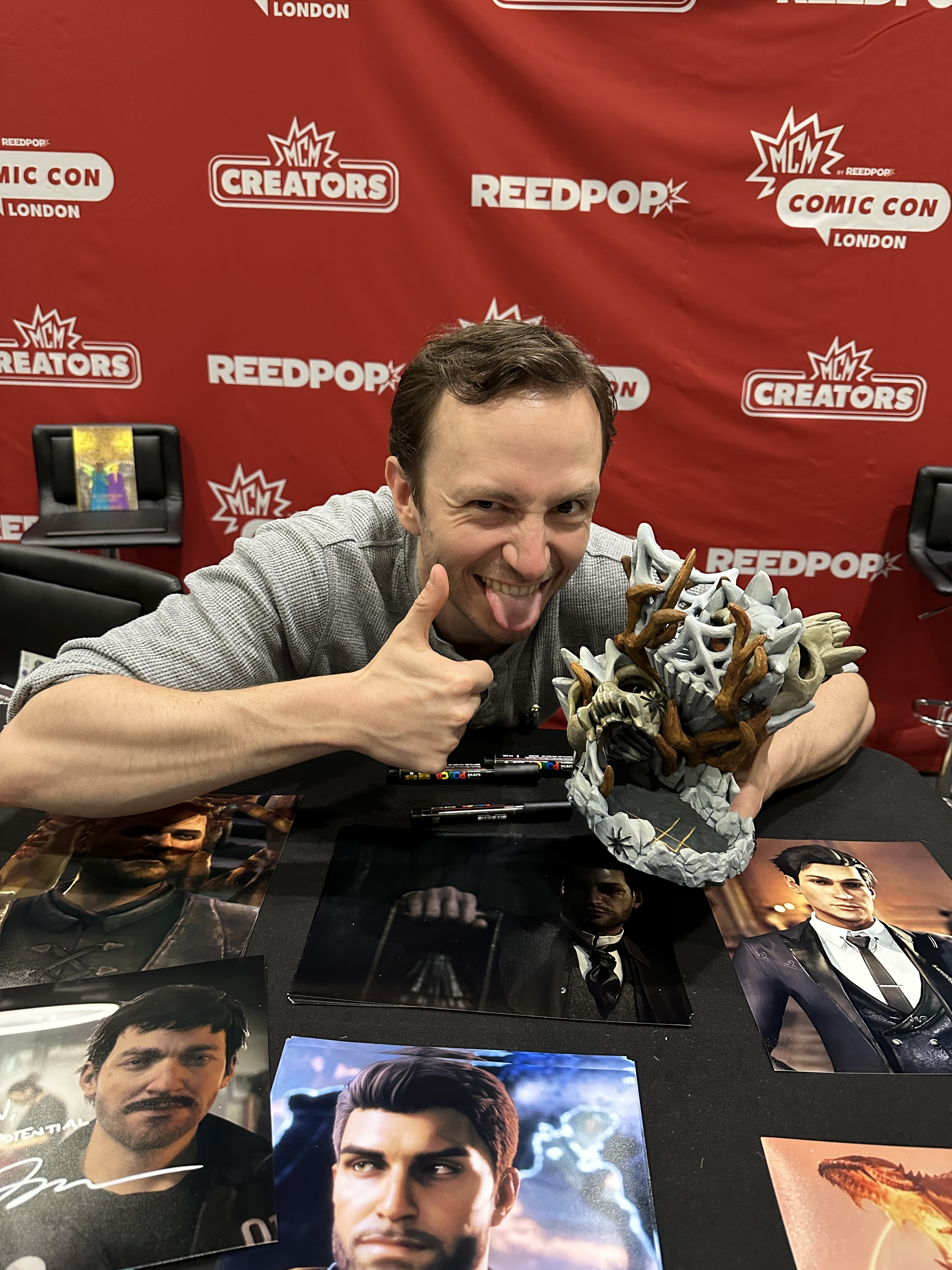
- Jordan at the 2025 MCM Comic Con London
- Born: Alexander Elliott Jordan; July 30, 1990 (age 36); Chichester, West Sussex
- Education: Bishop Luffa School Rose Bruford College BA (Hons) in Acting
- Occupation: Actor
- Years active: 2014–present
- Website: https://alexjordanactor.com/

Alexander Elliott Jordan (born 30 July 1990) is an English actor, impressionist and streamer, best known for his video game acting roles as one of two male voices for the customizable player character called Rook in Dragon Age: The Veilguard, Mr. Hands in Cyberpunk 2077: Phantom Liberty, the sex noises in Baldur's Gate 3, and as all 11 versions of Jan Dolski in The Alters.

Jordan also currently stars as I the Kobold Rogue in the Dungeons & Dragons actual play series Natural Six both live and on YouTube.

== Career ==
Jordan started his acting career by uploading impressions of popular actors such as Johnny Depp, Morgan Freeman, and Al Pacino to YouTube in 2006 under the name UrbanArtUK. A voice agent found him through these and signed him in 2008 at just 18 years old following which he went to Rose Bruford College drama school in London. Before his studies began he starred as Mr. Grasshopper in a 2007 stage rendition of James and the Giant Peach at the Chichester Festival Theatre.

After graduating from drama school in 2013 he started as a voice actor, gaining his first acting credit as Joe in series three of the audio drama The Confessions of Dorian Gray based on the Oscar Wilde novel of the same name, dramatized by David Llewellyn. He quickly followed with his first ever video game role as Asher Forrester in Game of Thrones: A Telltale Games Series. Jordan was also dabbling in stage work, starring as Bailey in The Words I Should Have Said to Phoebe Lewis with the End of the Line Theatre Company during Summer 2014 and as Marko in Tena Štivičić's award-winning play 3 Winters at the Royal National Theatre from November to February 2015.

He then landed his first voice-over role in animation in 2015 lending his voice to several characters, including Hot Dog Guy, in Season 4 of The Amazing World of Gumball. Roles he would continue for two more seasons. Jordan is scheduled to reprise his roles in a Gumball feature film which is currently in pre-production.

Several other minor roles in film, television, and major video game titles have followed such as Dr. Hargreaves in EastEnders, Steve Visby in Paddington 2, and Skrand Sharpbeak in Stellaris before he landed the titular role in the Sherlock Holmes video game series beginning with Sherlock Holmes: The Devil's Daughter (2016) and continuing with Sherlock Holmes Chapter One (2021) and Sherlock Holmes: The Awakened (2023).

In 2022, Jordan was announced as the male voice of The Professional in Warhammer 40,000: Darktide and joined the cast of Cyberpunk 2077 for its DLC Cyberpunk 2077: Phantom Liberty as Mr. Hands. In the latter he replaced Sean Power who had voiced the character in the original game.

Prior to the release of Dragon Age: The Veilguard in 2024, where he voiced the protagonist, he went viral on TikTok as the source of the Baldur's Gate 3 sex noises. The original video has since been viewed over 1.5 million times. He also voiced Jiyan in Wuthering Waves, a free-to-play open world action role-playing game, as well as Lord Frygt (an original role in The Lord of the Rings mythos) in The Lord of the Rings: The War of the Rohirrim.

In Jordan started the year voicing Dahm in Eternal Strands and followed up as the Ice King alongside fellow Baldur's Gate 3 alumnus Devora Wilde (Crime Boss) in Split Fiction. The two streamed their co-op let's play of the game together.

The Alters, Jordan's most ambitious project to date where he plays not only the main character Jan Dolski but also all his various incarnations was released on 13 June 2025. His performance has been praised for providing each clone with a unique, distinct personality while at the same time making them all feel "Jan-like". Game director Tomasz Kisilewicz of 11 Bit Studios has expressed the joy of working with him and praised his enthusiasm and persistence despite the "hundreds of hours" of recording required to handle a branching narrative where each alter may have a different intonation or completely different accent altogether. For his performance Jordan was nominated for a 2025 Golden Joystick Award in the Best Lead Performer category as well as longlisted for a British Academy Games Award for Performer in a Leading Role.

Jordan was made a fellow of Rose Bruford College in September 2025.

To start off 2026 Jordan was announced, alongside Natural Six cast mate Doug Cockle, as voicing yet to be named roles in Emberville. He will also voice direct the game.

=== Activism ===
Jordan is a supporter of the rights of voice talent related to the use of Generative artificial intelligence in the games industry. Along with his Natural Six castmates Doug Cockle and Harry McEntire he has spoken out in support of actors during the 2024–2025 SAG-AFTRA video game strike. Due to the fact that in the United Kingdom workers cannot strike in solidarity with their SAG-AFTRA counterparts in the United States, Jordan has not been helping with promotion of a new game instead.

== Personal life ==
Jordan lives in London with his wife, and dog Gatsby, having grown up in Hove, East Sussex and Chichester, West Sussex where he has continued to be involved in the community since becoming a professional actor. He is an avid football fan and supporter of his home town Brighton & Hove Albion F.C. who has spoken publicly several times about the social value, community and family impact of the game on himself and others in England.

== Selected filmography ==
=== Stage ===
Year	Production	Role	Notes
2014	The Words I Should Have Said to Phoebe Lewis	Bailey	
2014	3 Winters	Marko	Royal National Theatre

=== Film ===
Year	Title	Role	Notes
2017	Paddington 2	Steve Visby	
2024	The Glassworker	Professor Ansari	
2024	The Lord of the Rings: The War of the Rohirrim	Lord Frygt	

=== Television ===
Year	Title	Role	Notes
2015-2019	The Amazing World of Gumball	Business Ogre, Hot Dog Guy many others	51 episodes
2017	EastEnders	Dr. Hargreaves	1 episode
2025	Andor	Soldier #1	2 episodes

=== Video games ===
Year	Title	Role	Notes
2014	Game of Thrones: A Telltale Games Series	Asher Forrester	
2016	Stellaris	Skrand Sharpbeak	
2016	Sherlock Holmes: The Devil's Daughter	Sherlock Holmes	
2022	Sherlock Holmes Chapter One	Sherlock Holmes	
2022	Warhammer 40,000: Darktide	The Professional, Traitor Captain	
2023	Sherlock Holmes: The Awakened	Sherlock Holmes	
2023	Cyberpunk 2077: Phantom Liberty	Mr. Hands	
2023	Baldur's Gate 3	Sex noises	
2024	Wuthering Waves	Jiyan	
2024	Dragon Age: The Veilguard	Rook	
2025	Eternal Strands	Dahm	
2025	Split Fiction	Ice King	
2025	The Alters	Jan Dolski, Jan Dolski, Jan Dolski, Jan Dolski, Jan Dolski, Jan Dolski, Jan Dolski, Jan Dolski, Jan Dolski, Jan Dolski, Jan Dolski, Jan Dolski, Jan Dolski, Jan Dolski, Jan Dolski, Jan Dolski, Jan's Father	
2026	Emberville	TBA	Also voice director

=== Web series ===
Year	Title	Role	Notes	Source
2023–present	Natural Six	I		

== Awards and nominations ==
Year	Award	Category	Nominated work	Result	Ref.
2025	Golden Joystick Awards	Best Lead Performer	The Alters	Nominated	
2026	22nd British Academy Games Awards	Performer in a Leading Role	The Alters	Longlisted	
