= Natural Six =

UK based Dungeons & Dragons web series

- Genre: Fantasy; Actual play
- Based on: Dungeons & Dragons 5th edition
- Starring: Harry McEntire; Ben Starr; Doug Cockle; Aoife Wilson; Hollie Bennett; Alex Jordan
- Theme music composer: Alex Moukala
- Country of origin: United Kingdom
- Original language: English
- No. of episodes: 67

Production
- Production locations: London, England
- Running time: Approximately 150–240 minutes per episode
- Production company: Natural Six Ltd; DoubleJump

Original release
- Network: Twitch; YouTube
- Release: 2 April 2024 – present

Related
- Aftershow; Action Surge (2024 – present)

Natural Six is an actual play series set in the fictional world of Reliquiae where six video game industry professionals play Dungeons & Dragons. The group consists of American actor Doug Cockle, Northern Irish producer and writer Aoife Wilson, Welsh communications manager Hollie Bennett, and British actors Ben Starr, Alex Jordan, and Harry McEntire, with the latter serving as the primary Dungeon Master for the series. New episodes premiere weekly on YouTube, with story episodes alternating with Action Surge post-show episodes. Serving Cantrip, a Twitch hangout, is also held fortnightly.

The series has also been performed live at PAX East and MCM Comic Con London after debuting at EGX 2023.

== History ==
In June 2023, the cast came together to discuss playing Dungeons & Dragons in a London pub and "five bottles of rosé later..." decided they wanted to do so in front of a camera. Some of the group had met before, with the genesis of the idea to play having come when Alex Jordan and Ben Starr got to talking in the Side recording studio reception in London. Both were waiting to go into a booth and record for different video games. Jordan recruited colleague Doug Cockle and Starr brought in Hollie Bennett, having met her a mutual friend's house-warming party, as well as Harry McEntire who had been recommended to him as a potential Dungeon Master by fellow actual play group Oxventure.

In order to fund initial production the group announced a crowdfunding campaign on Kickstarter with a trailer on 9 October 2023. The campaign officially ran from 16 October to 15 November 2023. It received 907 backers, who contributed £67,932, surpassing the initial goal of £50,000 funding the first 10 episodes, plus the addition of miniatures and the podcast version.

The campaign's launch day also featured a YouTube video where the cast rolled their characters. On 27 October 2023, they followed up with a pre-recorded Session Zero. As part of the pre-launch, the group hosted a live show at EGX on 13 October 2023, which served as a Session 0.5.

Following the successful funding for the first 10 episodes a Natural Six Patreon has been introduced, with additional content available by subscription tier, as well as merchandise sales which debuted at MCM Comic Con x EGX 2024. The first online merchanise drop sold out in half an hour.

== Production ==
=== Format ===
Episodes are recorded in-studio, with filming taking place one weekend a month, recording two story episodes and two Action Surge episodes per weekend. Natural Six typically stays one to two episodes ahead of the published story episodes. Filming, editing, and production are managed by the video production agency DoubleJump.

=== Action Surge ===
In addition to story episodes, Natural Six also releases Action Surge, available one week after the release of story episodes or immediately for Patreon members. Originally designed to help maintain a weekly content schedule—since the team could only film and fund two full story episodes per month—Action Surge was designed to be a companion to the main adventure. Action Surge episodes alternate weekly with story episodes and are available as both video and podcast versions.

== World and story ==
Natural Six follows a story designed and written by the Dungeon Master Harry McEntire. Initially conceived for a series of offline D&D sessions, the group turned it into an actual play series once McEntire shared his initial plans for the story.

Thousands of years ago, the Gods were locked in a divine war as the embodiments of good (The Virtuous), evil (The Vile), and order and chaos (The Wild) did battle. After millennia, The Virtuous were victorious and ushered in the Immortal Peace, consigning the memory of evil to history. Driven by a desire to use their divine power to create, rather than destroy, they called into existence Reliquiae, a great fertile crater surrounded on all sides by a ring of impassable mountains called The Allanites.

Once peace settled, each God also brought forth a mortal race to populate this new world, imbuing them with an essence of their own divinity. Mortality flourished; cities, towns, trade routes, and centres of magic and learning sprung up as the land fed its people and the Gods offered counsel.

Yet, even during peace, the mortal realm often falls short of perfection; feuds, thefts, murders, extortions, and all manner of other ills can be found throughout the land, despite its political and religious stability. From this, The Web was born.

The Web is an organization that offers protection and procurement, at a price. Originally founded in the city of Eskalond, The Web has grown in influence and scope, expanding rapidly to spread itself across the continent. It is known by many as the last refuge of the desperate. If a farmer owes a debt they cannot pay, if a family wishes to settle an age-old score, or a scholar longs to recover something lost long ago, they seek the silken embrace of The Web.

Those who wish to avail themselves of The Web's services can pay in gold or time. Many of the debts of those paying "the time price" pledge years of their life or even subsequent generations of their family.

The story starts by following the stories of five heroes as they begin their mission.

== Cast and characters ==
Natural Six is formed of six principal cast members—one Dungeon Master and five player characters

- Harry McEntire - Dungeon Master
- Doug Cockle - Kelnys – Dragonborn druid
- Ben Starr - Raidion Thornbear – Wood Elf wizard
- Aoife Wilson - Dolly DeWinter – Tiefling bard
- Alex Jordan - I – Kobold rogue
- Hollie Bennett - Elowen "Ellie" Grēnweard – Human fighter (Previously known as Endellion Rinnan)

== Episodes ==
=== Campaign One ===
Episode	Title	Original Release Date
0	Session Zero	27 October 2023
0.5	Session 0.5 Live from EGX	3 November 2023
1	The Gods Are Real	2 April 2024
2	The Shadow Will Flood	16 April 2024
3	Oathbreaker	30 April 2024
4	The Newly Dead	14 May 2024
5	The Girl in the Cell	28 May 2024
6	Hot Heads and Fast Words	11 June 2024
7	The Spider and The Flies	25 June 2024
8	The Bodies and the Book	9 July 2024
9	The Prisoner in the Attic	23 July 2024
10	The Kindness of Strangers	6 August 2024
11	Trials of the Brothers	20 August 2024
12	Flies in the Ointment	3 September 2024
13	The God Killers	17 September 2024
14	Secrets for Sale	1 October 2024
15	Blood, Wine, and Moonlight	15 October 2024
16	Politics and Poker Faces	29 October 2024
17	A Date with Death	12 November 2024
18	A Toast to Trouble	26 November 2024
19	Scales of Justice	10 December 2024
Christmas Special	Critical Failures, Chaos, and Cocktails	24 December 2024
20	The Sting of Suspicion	7 January 2025
21	The Sanctum	21 January 2025
22	Son of the Treespeaker	4 February 2025
23	A Leap into the Unknown	18 February 2025
24	City of Shadows	4 March 2025
25	Blood of the Kobold	18 March 2025
26	The Rift Below	1 April 2025
27	Croak and Dagger	15 April 2025
28	Burning Shadows	29 April 2025
29	The Midnight Moon	13 May 2025
30	The Bard and the Bowed	27 May 2025
31	The Hand You're Dealt	10 June 2025
32	Trust Fall	24 June 2025
33	Seeds of Change	8th July 2025
34	A Taste of Autumn	22nd July 2025
35	Scents and Sensibility	5th August 2025
36	The Old Dark	19th August 2025
37	Cradle to Grave	2nd September 2025
38	Nine Souls Needed	16th September 2025
39	The Colour of Divinity	30th September 2025
40	The Gross and the Great	14th October 2025
41	A Well-Placed Knife	28th October 2025
42	Hope is Easy	11th November 2025
43	The Last Light	25th November 2025
44	The Dreams of Elowen Grēnweard	9th December 2025
45	The Last Ride of Calypso Moonrise	6th January 2026
46	The House of Unknown Letters	20th January 2026
47	The Ganders Grace	3rd February 2026
48	Diamonds in the Rough	17th February 2026
49	No Secrets Among Friends	3rd March 2026
50	Dressed to Impress	17th March 2026
51	The Sins of the Sinless	31st March 2026
52	The Sword of The Flood	14th April 2026
53	Boorish Rebuke	28th April 2026
54	Song of the Treespeaker	12th May 2026
55	The Forest Grows	26th March 2026
56	Bone and Cloth	9th June 2026
57	The Everfire	23rd June 2026
58	The White Stag	7th July 2026
59	The Dragon Rider	21th July 2026
60	Hanging by a Thread	4th August 2026
61	The Corpsewyrm	18th August 2026
62	Just a Wasp	1st September 2026
63	Blood of the Dragon	15th September 2026
64	Glass and Gold	29th September 2026
65	Hot and Bothered	13th October 2026
66	A Fiery Endorsement	27th October 2026
67	Elections and Exaltations	10th November 2026

=== One Shots ===
Title	Dungeon Master	Original Release Date	Notes
Dream of the Dragonborn	Harry McEntire	30 August 2024	Using the 2024 Player's Handbook
The Alters x Natural Six	Alex Jordan	16 June 2025	Tie in with The Alters video game
Elf 'n' Safety	Alex Jordan	23 December 2025	Christmas special
Welcome to the Ruby Rebellion	Aoife Wilson	30 December 2025	Drakonym two-part special
Monsters in the Moonlight	Aoife Wilson	16 January 2026	Drakonym two-part special
Journey to the Witchspire	Harry McEntire	4 June 2026	Tie in with Witchspire by Envar games
The Journey Begins	Aoife Wilson	2 July 2026	Legends of Akeroth two-part special
Crabs, Cranks & Crowns	Aoife Wilson	16 July 2026	Legends of Akeroth two-part special
