= Ben Starr =

Ben Starr may refer to:

- Ben Starr (television producer) (1921–2014), American television producer, creator, writer and playwright
- Ben Starr (actor) (born 1988), English actor
