= Ella McLeod =

Ella McLeod may refer to:

- Ella McLeod (nurse) (1921–2011), New Zealand nurse, wife of civil engineer Colin McLeod
- Ella McLeod (writer) (born 1996), English author and podcaster
