= The First Berserker: Khazan =

2025 video game

- Developer: Neople
- Publisher: Nexon
- Director: Lee Jun-ho
- Producer: Yoob Myeong-jin
- Composers: Lee Jae-kwang, Go Young-hwa, a-JAE (Shin Wook-jae), 2WEI
- Engine: Unreal Engine 4
- Platforms: PlayStation 5; Windows; Xbox Series X/S
- Release: WW: March 27, 2025
- Genre: Action role-playing game
- Mode: Single-player

The First Berserker: Khazan (Korean: 퍼스트 버서커: 카잔) is a 2025 action role-playing game developed by Neople and published by Nexon. Set in a fictional European-inspired medieval fantasy world, the game takes place within the universe of the Dungeon & Fighter series. Gameplay centers around stamina-based combat, requiring players to strategically manage their stamina to dodge, block, and launch attacks. Players are encouraged to adopt an aggressive approach to prevent enemies from recovering their own stamina. The game features a 3D cel-shaded anime-inspired art style. The deluxe edition of the game was released early on March 24, 2025, which was followed by the regular release on March 27.

== Gameplay ==
The First Berserker: Khazan is a third-person action game in which the player takes control of the protagonist, Khazan. The gameplay emphasizes stamina management, where actions such as attacking and defending consume stamina. If the stamina bar is depleted entirely, the player becomes temporarily helpless. Healing items can be had at checkpoints but are highly limited in general, though more can be unlocked through exploration. Enemies also have a stamina bar, which, when depleted, causes them to become staggered, similarly to Sekiro: Shadows Die Twice. Standard blocking mitigates most incoming damage, while mechanics such as perfect blocks, parries, and reflections can reduce enemy health and stamina. During combat, the player accumulates Spirit points, which enables the use of weapon skills that do not consume stamina.

The game features three weapons: a well-balanced dual-wield axe and short-sword, a slow and heavy great sword, and an agile, long-range spear. Equipment upgrades can be found in random drops in levels, from defeated enemies, or in chests. Individual weapons and armor each have an assigned rarity level, random damage and defense values, and bonus attributes such as stat bonuses. Equipping a complete set of matching gear provides predetermined set bonuses.

The game includes two primary currencies, Gold and Lacrima. Gold is used to purchase items, like consumables or new equipment, while Lacrima is required for leveling up character stats. Upon death, the player loses all unspent Lacrima, though it can be recovered by returning to the point of death without dying again, which is characteristic of the Soulslike genre. Additionally, bonus Lacrima is awarded when dying during boss encounters, based on the amount of damage dealt prior to defeat.

Gameplay is structured around individual missions set within levels, which include unlockable shortcuts and checkpoints. Each level contains hidden items and collectibles designed to encourage exploration of side paths and ends with a boss battle. A central hub, known as The Crevice, serves as the player's base of operations. This area contains various non-player characters such as shopkeepers and provides access to completed missions and side quests that remix the main levels.

The player may also summon a non-player-character ally during boss encounters by using a special consumable item. These summoning items are obtained by locating and defeating mini-bosses.

== Plot ==
General Khazan, a former hero of the Pell Los Empire, was branded a traitor to the Empire along with his best friend Ozma, a powerful mage. His sentence was the severing of his tendons and his exile. As Pell Los soldiers escort him through Mount Heinmach, a ghost seeking a host to exist in the mortal world, chooses Khazan as a candidate. The ghost creates an avalanche, freeing Khazan from his chains and possessing him. While his wounds were healed, Khazan struggles for control of his own body as he tries to traverse the mountain range, fighting wildlife and Pell Los soldiers. He eventually passes out from exhaustion, and is found by Quimuk, an elderly shaman of the Bantu Tribe. Quimuk takes him to an ancient warrior's trial to face the ghost that possesses him. Khazan eventually meets the ghost face-to-face, the ghost revealing itself to be the Blade Phantom, an aggregation of warriors who died in combat. Khazan defeats the Blade Phantom, but instead of expelling the dead warriors, Khazan offers a truce in exchange for the Phantom's powers. The Phantom tells Khazan the warriors' goal in the mortal world: there has been an imbalance of souls entering the Netherworld, and their master Charon has sent them to find and stop the cause. Khazan must help the Blade Phantom restore balance to the mortal world and in return, the warriors will help him with his revenge against the Emperor and all who betrayed him.

Khazan travels across the Pell Los Empire, searching for those who betrayed him, while fighting supernatural creatures that do not belong in the mortal world. He is joined by several allies such as his former soldier Tristan, shield maiden Elamein, blacksmith Qazumaka, and Netherworld messenger Daphrona. Khazan eventually finds out that Ozma was executed, and that a forbidden type of magic called Chaos, which is powerful and corruptive enough to destroy otherwise immortal souls, is the source of the imbalance of souls entering the Netherworld. While Khazan investigates a Chaos laboratory, Elemein is abducted. While Khazan tries to shut down the machine imprisoning her, it is deactivated too late and Elemein is possessed by Chaos. With no other choice, Khazan is forced to kill her. While rescuing his former soldiers from a work camp in Linon Mine, one of them, Yulian, reveales that Ozma faked his execution and was in fact working with the Emperor. Enraged, Khazan turns his focus to seeking Ozma instead of the Emperor. Meanwhile, Ozma betrays the Emperor, kills him, and destroys the Capital.

While en route to the Capital, Khazan encounters a dark elf necromancer named Bellerian, who used to work with Ozma in researching Necromancy and Chaos magic. When Ozma went mad with power and resorted to kidnapping innocent people for test subjects, Bellerian fled into hiding. Bellerian also confirmed it was Ozma that orchestrated the trap that lead to Khazan's arrest and betrayal. Now knowing Ozma is the mage causing chaos magic across the mortal realm, the warriors of the Blade Phantom state that their goal and Khazan's are now one and the same. Near the capital, Khazan faces off against a chaos-corrupted Reese, a priestess who was a childhood friend of Khazan and Ozma's, as well as Ozma's lover. After Khazan defeats her, Reese pleads with her final words that Khazan save Ozma.

Finally reaching the capital, Daphrona asks Khazan what he will do once he faces Ozma. Three choices are presented, which result in three different endings:

- Ending 1 – Choosing "I will have my revenge" will result in the default ending. After defeating Ozma, after 2 phases the Empire collapses. Khazan returns to Ozma's home and mourns the death of Reese. The warriors of the Blade Phantom tell Khazan that their contract is not yet complete as there is still chaos in the mortal realm, and Khazan begrudgingly accepts that.
- Ending 2 – Choosing "I want to speak to him" will result in the good ending. To unlock this option, Khazan must complete the side missions that unlock the Blade Phantom's sword and the Charon's chains. In the fight against Ozma, Khazan hesitates, which allows Ozma to initiate a third phase. Equipped with the chains and sword, Khazan defeats Ozma, who sheds a tear, apologizes to Khazan, and dies in Khazan's arms. Khazan returns to Ozma's home and mourns the death of both Reese and Ozma. The Blade Phantom tells Khazan the same thing as the previous ending, but it ends with Khazan saying sorry to Ozma.
- Ending 3 – Choosing "I want to know the truth" will result in the true ending. To unlock this option, the player needs to fulfill the previous requirements along with finding all 3 fragments of Aldevir's Disc to complete the bonus mission involving what happened to Reese. In the fight against Ozma, the same events will occur as in ending 2, only that Ozma will release a burst of chaos energy and call for the end of the world before exploding. From there, Khazan will return to Ozma's home and find the source of Ozma's motivation. Before the events of the game, a supernatural being in the form of a single eye showed Ozma the power of Chaos magic, and he studied it in the hopes it could help him and Khazan defeat Hismar, a powerful dragon that plagued the Empire. Khazan and Ozma eventually did slay Hismar and were made heroes. One day, the Emperor's soldiers, marked by the Eye, approaches Reese and states the Emperor wants her to be made his concubine. She refused and fled into hiding, but was eventually found and executed. Enraged, Ozma retaliated and was arrested. While Ozma was carted through the streets in chains, the citizens of the kingdom called him a traitor despite him being the hero that saved them from the dragon. Brokenhearted and ridiculed, Ozma viewed humanity itself as a great evil, and orchestrated the plan to resurrect Reese and destroy humanity with the use of Chaos magic. Now knowing that there is still a being out there that gave Ozma the knowledge of Chaos magic, and influenced the Emperor's soldiers, Khazan proclaims his revenge is not yet complete, and unites with the Blade Phantom warriors.

== Development ==
The First Berserker: Khazan was developed by Neople. It was directed by Lee Jun ho, and produced by Park Eunhui and Lee Wontae. Khazan's graphical style originated from the cancelled Dungeon Fighter Online prototype, Project BBQ.

The creative director Junho Lee highlighted that the game is deeply rooted in the Dungeon & Fighter Series (DNF) universe, "The whole development team are huge lovers of the original DNF universe. We're servicing and developing the original at the same time, and we're thinking of releasing more content based on the IP [intellectual property] like comics, anime, novels." The game's difficulty and medieval fantasy melee-combat has evoked comparisons with some of FromSoftware's titles, however JunHo Lee also explained "guess that's the way a player can actually feel [that it's a Soulslike], especially for the very first session of the game." "But at the same time, are the FromSoftware games the biggest inspiration? We probably say no."

Art director Kychul Lee discussed the game's unique visual style, "Instead of the typical photorealistic graphic approach that a lot of 3D games take these days, we've gone for the cartoon rendering graphic because it's more evocative. People can look at that and connect to the game even better because it's more evocative, it's more emotional."

Junho Lee spoke to Game Rant about development of the story, "The story is really about uncovering the conspiracy behind his exile while also incorporating the drama of his quest for revenge. Khazan sacrificed everything in service of the Empire, and the Empire in turn sacrificed Khazan."

It was playable in two separate demo releases before its official launch. The first was a closed beta in October 2024 for PlayStation 5 and Xbox Series X. The second was available indefinitely starting in January 2025, for the same platforms as well as for Steam.

== Reception ==
Reception

Aggregate scores
Aggregator	Score
Metacritic	(PC) 83/100 (XBSX) 80/100 (PS5) 78/100
OpenCritic	83% recommend

Review scores
Publication	Score
Digital Trends	3.5/5
Edge	6/10
Eurogamer	4/5
GameSpot	8/10
Hardcore Gamer	3.5/5
IGN	8/10
PC Gamer (US)	80/100
PCGamesN	7/10
PCMag	4/5
Push Square	6/10
Shacknews	7/10
VG247	4/5
Vice	Strongly Recommended
Siliconera	8/10
GamingBolt	7/10
XboxEra	8.7/10

The First Berserker: Khazan received "generally favorable" reviews, according to review aggregator website Metacritic. OpenCritic determined that 83% of critics recommend the game.

Critical praise for Khazan often centered around its boss fights. IGN first described them as "a peak point of frustration", but came to enjoy the process of learning boss movesets and timing. Push Square praised the variety of the main mission boss fights, and PCGamesN found the bosses to be good showcases of the depth's of Khazan's combat system, requiring a mastery of it to defeat them. The quality-of-life system, that grants Lacrima for reducing a boss's health even when Khazan is killed, was positively received. VG247 and Push Square criticized its reuse of bosses in side missions, often immediately after the boss was fought for the first time. PCMag criticized the "bloated health" in the boss fights.

The general combat mechanics of the game were generally reviewed positively; GameSpot and PC Gamer praised the multitude of defensive options available to the player, with Khazan providing its own take on the standards of the genre. Many critics noted a very large emphasis on stamina management; Shacknews praised it as being "demanding and exhilarating", with a heavy emphasis on learning boss timings; and VG247 praised the back-and-forth of depleting bosses stamina while maintaining Khazan's own. Digital Trends found that the player's stamina recovery rate was insufficient to deal with Khazan's aggressive bosses, and Push Square found the inconsistency with which tools were effective against which bosses with appropriate timing frustrating. Siliconera considered Khazan to be focused on defense, with wearing down enemy stamina to deal a critical blow through a "Brutal Attack" being the best strategy for bosses. Khazan's loot system was compared to the Nioh series, and received a mixed reception. Digitial Trends and Vice both praised the game as being "streamlined" and less bloated than Nioh. However, Vice and IGN criticized it for not having a large impact on the way the game is played. Push Square felt that the loot drops were both excessive in quantity and insignificant in impacting game play, while requiring the player to spend a large amount of time in menus managing it.

Khazan's level design and mission structure were frequently criticized, with many critics noting that the game was repetitive and lacking incentive for exploration, while not meeting the level of challenge present in the boss fights. GameSpot commented that the levels were sufficient for delivering its combat encounters, but lacked the "feeling of a labyrinthine, interconnected space" that other games in the genre have. Digital Trends did praise it overall, appreciating the unlockable shortcuts, but criticizing the mission structure for resetting a level entirely each time you return to it for making farming levels for useful drops inconvenient. The campaign was noted by critics to being quite long in general, especially with side missions required for an extra ending.

Similarly, the plot was generally received as minimally acceptable, being predictable and generic while not serving any other purpose than to bring the player through the missions; however, the story was not considered to be a main draw for games in the genre in the first place. Shacknews described it as a revenge story "with little attempt at [...] doing anything interesting with the tired vengeance trope at all". IGN praised the side quests for adding depth to the story not present in the main missions. The character designs were generally well received, especially the voice performance of Ben Starr as the protagonist and Anthony Howell (Margit/Morgott from Elden Ring) as the Blade Phantom. GamingBolt considered the overall voice acting from the cast to be stronger than the game's voice writing. The setting was generally considered relatively uninteresting, especially for those lacking context from the Dungeon & Fighter series.

=== Sales ===
In an earnings call covering the first quarter of the fiscal year, publisher Nexon stated that the game underperformed its sales targets. However, they still considered it to be a success due to it bringing in more interest to the Dungeon & Fighter series in regions that were previously uninterested.
