= Harry McEntire =

English actor (born 1990)

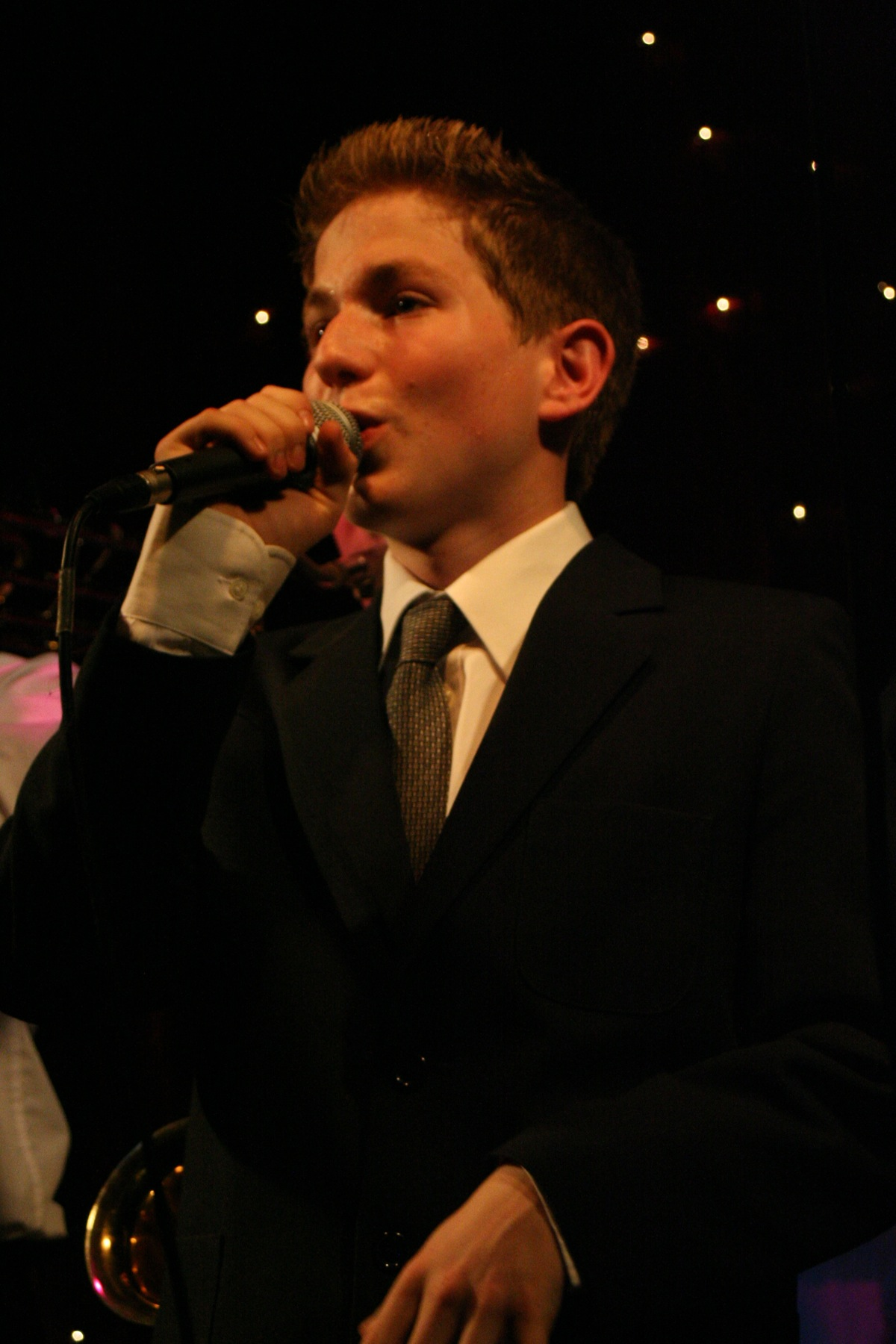
- McEntire in 2007
- Born: 14 September 1990 (age 36); Redhill, Surrey, England
- Occupation: Actor
- Years active: 2007–present

Harry McEntire (born 14 September 1990) is an English actor. He is known for his roles in Tower Block, for his numerous theatre roles, such as in the award-winning London production of Spring Awakening. In television, McEntire played Æthelwold in The Last Kingdom. As a voice actor, McEntire starred in the English dub of Xenoblade Chronicles 3 as Noah and the Chinese RPG Wuthering Waves as Avidius.

McEntire won the Best Actor Manchester Theatre Award in 2015 for his role in Billy Liar, at the Royal Exchange Theatre.

== Biography ==
In June 2023, McEntire, Alex Jordan, Hollie Bennett, Ben Starr, Aoife Wilson, and Doug Cockle began a web series where they play Dungeons & Dragons. The group ran a Kickstarter campaign from October to November 2023, raising £67,932 on a £50,000 goal. McEntire leads the group, known as Natural Six, as its Dungeon Master and chief architect of the series' fantasy world of Reliquiae.

== Filmography ==
=== Television ===
Year	Title	Role	Notes
2004	Tracy Beaker: The Movie of Me	Boy at the station	Television film
2007	Jinx		Unaired pilot episode
2008	Clay	Davie	Television film
2009	Po5t	William	Web series Honored at the 2010 Webby Awards in the "Online Film & Video – Drama" category
2011	Eric and Ernie	Young Ernie	Television film
2012	Some Girls	Jordan	2 episodes
2012–2013	Prisoners' Wives	Matt	Supporting role
2012–2014	Episodes	Jason	Supporting role
2015	Father Brown	Frank Albert	Episode: "The Owl of Minerva"
2015	Carter Mysteries: The Incident of the Russian Visitors	Steven	Radio series
2015–2018	The Last Kingdom	Æthelwold	Supporting role (season 1–2); Main cast (season 3)
2016	Endeavour	Ronnie Gidderton	Episode: "Coda"
2016	The Secret	Matt	Episode: "Part 3"
2016	Victoria	Edward Oxford	Episode: "Young England"
2019	Britannia	Young Harka	Episode: "Genesis"
2022	Andor	Weapons Specialist	Episode: "Daughter of Ferrix"

=== Film ===
Year	Title	Role	Notes
2012	Unconditional Love	Owen	
2012	Tower Block	Daniel	

=== Video games ===
Year	Title	Voice role	Notes	Ref.
2020	Assassin's Creed Valhalla	Hunwald		
2022	Xenoblade Chronicles 3	Noah, N		
2022	Valkyrie Elysium	Armand		
2023	Xenoblade Chronicles 3: Future Redeemed	N		
2023	Final Fantasy XVI	Additional voices		
2024	Arknights	Verdant		
2025	Final Fantasy Tactics: The Ivalice Chronicles	Mustadio		
2025	Wuthering Waves	Avidius		
2025	Age of Empires II: Definitive Edition	Alexander the Great	Chronicles: Alexander the Great expansion	
2026	Black Jacket	Reed		
TBA	Emberville	TBA	Early access release set for October 2026	
TBA	Stronghold 4	TBA		

=== Theatre ===
Year	Title	Role	Notes
2009	Spring Awakening	Ernst	Won four Laurence Olivier Awards, including "Best New Musical"
2010	A Thousand Stars Explode in the Sky	Michael	
2013	Debris	Michael	Lead role with Leila Mimmack
2015	Billy Liar	Billy Liar	Lead role Won a Manchester Theatre Award for "Best Actor"

=== Web series ===
Year	Title	Role	Notes	Ref
2024–present	Natural Six	Dungeon Master		
