= Gibbous - A Cthulhu Adventure =

2019 video game

- Developer: Stuck In Attic
- Publisher: Stuck In Attic
- Director: Liviu Boar
- Producer: Liviu Boar
- Designer: Liviu Boar
- Programmer: Nicu Câmpian
- Artist: Cami Cuibus
- Writer: Liviu Boar
- Composer: Cami Cuibus
- Engine: Unity
- Platforms: Microsoft Windows, macOS, Linux, Nintendo Switch
- Release: Windows, macOS, Linux; August 7, 2019; Nintendo Switch; October 28, 2020
- Genre: Point-and-click adventure game
- Mode: Single-player

Gibbous - A Cthulhu Adventure is a point-and-click adventure game developed and published by Romanian developer Stuck In Attic for Windows, macOS, Linux and Nintendo Switch. It was released on August 7, 2019 on Steam and GOG.

== Gameplay ==
The player takes control of one out of three protagonists in each of the seven chapters. In order to advance, the player has to pick up items and talk to other characters to solve puzzles. When playing as Buzz Kerwan, the player can use his cat Kitteh to solve certain puzzles or ask her for advice which works as an in-game hint system. When playing as Don R. Ketype, the player can find hints in his diary. Some key scenes in the game are presented as animated cutscenes that can be watched again from the main menu. The player can also highlight all hotspots in each scene or zoom by pressing a button.

== Plot ==
Detective Don R. Ketype is hired to find and bring back the Necronomicon that is supposed to be located in the Miskatonic Library in Darkham. However, things don't go according to plan. Don gets kidnapped by a strange cult and the librarian, Buzz Kerwan, stumbles upon the evil tome himself. After he accidentally makes his cat Kitteh talk by speaking a spell from the book, he sets out to reverse the effect. In the course of the game, the three protagonists work together and travel to different places to solve the mysteries involving the Necronomicon and the different cults.

== Characters ==
=== Protagonists ===
- Buzz Kerwan (voiced by Liviu Boar)

He is a librarian working at the Miskatonic Library in Darkham. He is kind of goofy and an average guy who stumbles upon the Necronomicon, and gets dragged into a cosmic plot.

- Don R. Ketype (voiced by Don Thacker)

He is a detective who has been hired to find the Necronomicon. When he meets Buzz, he gets dragged into a world of cults and cosmic plots.

- Kitteh (voiced by Lindsay Peck)

She is Buzz's cat and now talks after he spoke a spell from the Necronomicon. She is very cynical and sarcastic, but helps Buzz nonetheless when he needs it.

=== Side characters ===
- The Butcher (voiced by Doug Cockle)

He is the antagonist of the game who is planning something evil in the town of Fishmouth.

- Barnabas Busara (voiced by Josef Gagnier)

He is a mysterious man looking for Bob Olmstein.

- Peace Busara (voiced by Anairis Quinones)

She is Barnabas's daughter.

- Bob Olmstein

A mysterious being who might appear different to each person or who might not be recognized at all.

== Development ==
The game was developed by a small team consisting of three members from Târgu Mureș, Transylvania, Romania. In 2016, the game was funded through a Kickstarter campaign. The goal of 39.270 CHF was exceeded and a total sum of 53.862 CHF from nearly 2,000 backers was achieved. The game draws inspiration from the Cthulhu Mythos by American writer H. P. Lovecraft and was also inspired by 90s LucasArts games, while the art direction was inspired by Disney movies and Studio Ghibli works. It was translated into 12 languages that were available at launch, and features more than 70 English-speaking voice actors including Doug Cockle and Amber Lee Connors.

It was released on August 7, 2019 on Steam and GOG. A port for Nintendo Switch followed on October 28, 2020.

== Reception ==
Reception

Aggregate score
Aggregator	Score
Metacritic	74/100

Gibbous - A Cthuhlu Adventure received "mixed or average reviews", according to review aggregator platform Metacritic, based on 14 reviews.

Teodor Nechita from Softpedia gave 4 out of 5 stars and compared the atmosphere of the game to Tim Burton. In the review it said, "All in all, Gibbous - A Cthulhu Adventure is a game that no self-proclaimed point-and -click fan should overlook, as it will definitely find a place in your gaming library, comedy movie collection, and finally, your heart."

Joe Keeley from Adventure Gamers gave 3 out of 5 stars, praising the art design and animation, the sense of humor, the voice acting from two of the three main characters, and the puzzles, but critzising the convoluted story, the at times unnatural dialogue, the grating voice acting from the third main character and some side characters, and the unsatisfactory ending. He said, "Gibbous: A Cthulhu Adventure looks amazing and will make you laugh, but its inability to tell a coherent story prevents this comedy cosmic horror adventure from fulfilling its abundant potential."

== Sequels ==
In July 2021, Stuck in Attic announced a new game titled Near-Mage that is set in the same universe called Kittehverse. Though not a direct sequel, the game will tie up narrative threads from Gibbous and will feature characters that have appeared in the first game. The player will take control of Illy Vraja, who visits the Transylvanian Institute for Magick, and will learn how to use spells and brew potions in order to help characters around the Institute, the real-life town of Sighișoara and the mythical town of Rakus. In August 2021, they started a Kickstarter campaign in order to finance the development. The funding goal of 25.250 € was exceeded in less than 24 hours. The game was released on May 27, 2025.

A focus tool called Hocus Focus was released on August 7, 2026. It is set in the same universe and shares many locations and assets from Near-Mage.
