= Near-Mage =

2025 video game

- Developer: Stuck In Attic
- Publisher: Stuck In Attic
- Director: Liviu Boar
- Producer: Liviu Boar
- Designer: Liviu Boar
- Artist: Cami Cuibus
- Writer: Liviu Boar
- Engine: Unity
- Platforms: Microsoft Windows, macOS, Linux
- Release: May 27, 2025
- Genre: Point-and-click adventure game
- Mode: Single-player

Near-Mage is a point-and-click adventure game that also includes RPG elements developed and published by Romanian developer Stuck In Attic for Windows, macOS, and Linux. It was released on May 27, 2025.

== Gameplay ==
The gameplay combines point-and-click mechanics with direct character control. Players explore interconnected environments across three main areas: the real-world town of Sighișoara, its magical counterpart Rakus, and the Magick Institute itself. Navigation can be done by walking, running, or, later, flying.

A core mechanic involves learning near-spells and combining them to real spells based on elements such as earth, fire, water, air, soul, and blood. These spells can be acquired through in-game classes at certain points in the story. Spells can be used to interact with characters, solve puzzles, and affect the game world. Players can customize their spell inventory and choose different magical approaches to problems, or refrain from using Magick at all.

Certain quests feature multiple solutions and consequences depending on the spells used or decisions made. Character customization options allow players to alter Illy's appearance through various outfits and hairstyles.

== Plot ==
Near-Mage follows the story of Illy Vraja, a teenager who discovers that she has inherited latent magical abilities from her Transylvanian ancestry. After receiving a mysterious invitation, she travels to the fictional Transylvanian Institute for Magick to begin her training as a "Near-Mage", a category of spellcaster who has not yet fully awakened their magical potential.

Upon arrival in the region of Sighișoara, Illy begins to uncover the hidden magical layers of the world, including the parallel city of Rakus, inhabited by supernatural beings such as vampyres, strigoi, and ghouls. As she attends classes and explores the surrounding areas, Illy becomes involved in local conflicts, magical mysteries, and historical tensions between the magical and non-magical communities, the so-called Arcanyls.

The plot develops through interactions with other students, faculty, and townspeople, with Illy gradually learning about her family's past, Magick, and the political dynamics within the magical world. The narrative branches depending on player choices, including if and how Illy uses magic and how she relates to various characters and factions.

== Development ==
Near-Mage was developed by the Romanian independent studio Stuck In Attic, based in Târgu Mureș. The game was announced in 2021 as a follow-up to the studio's previous title, Gibbous - A Cthulhu Adventure. Like its predecessor, Near-Mage features hand-drawn 2D animation and a point-and-click interface, but it expands on gameplay mechanics with the addition of spellcrafting and light RPG elements.

The game was funded through a Kickstarter campaign launched in September 2021, which met its funding goal within hours and eventually raised over €125,000.

Development focused on combining traditional adventure gameplay with more dynamic systems such as spell experimentation, branching dialogue, and character customization. The setting incorporates real locations in Transylvania, with Sighișoara serving as a major inspiration. The team aimed to blend fantasy elements with cultural references drawn from local mythology and history.

The game was developed using the Unity engine and features voice acting, animated cutscenes, and a fully orchestrated soundtrack. It was translated into German and Russian for the launch, and it was released for Windows, macOS, and Linux in May 2025.

== Reception ==
Reception

Aggregate score
Aggregator	Score
Metacritic	72/100

Near-Mage received "mixed or average" reviews, according to review aggregator Metacritic. Critics praised its visual style, humor, and imaginative worldbuilding. Reviewers highlighted the game's hand-drawn animation, branching dialogue, and the integration of Romanian folklore as standout features.

Adventure Game Hotspot praised the voice acting and soundtrack, but noted that some puzzles felt underdeveloped compared to the narrative content.

Cosmin Vasile, writing for Softpedia, noted that although the game "doesn't quite realize its full potential," its imaginative magical setting and appealing art style balance moments of underdeveloped puzzles and animations.
