= Ella McLeod (writer) =

English writer and podcaster

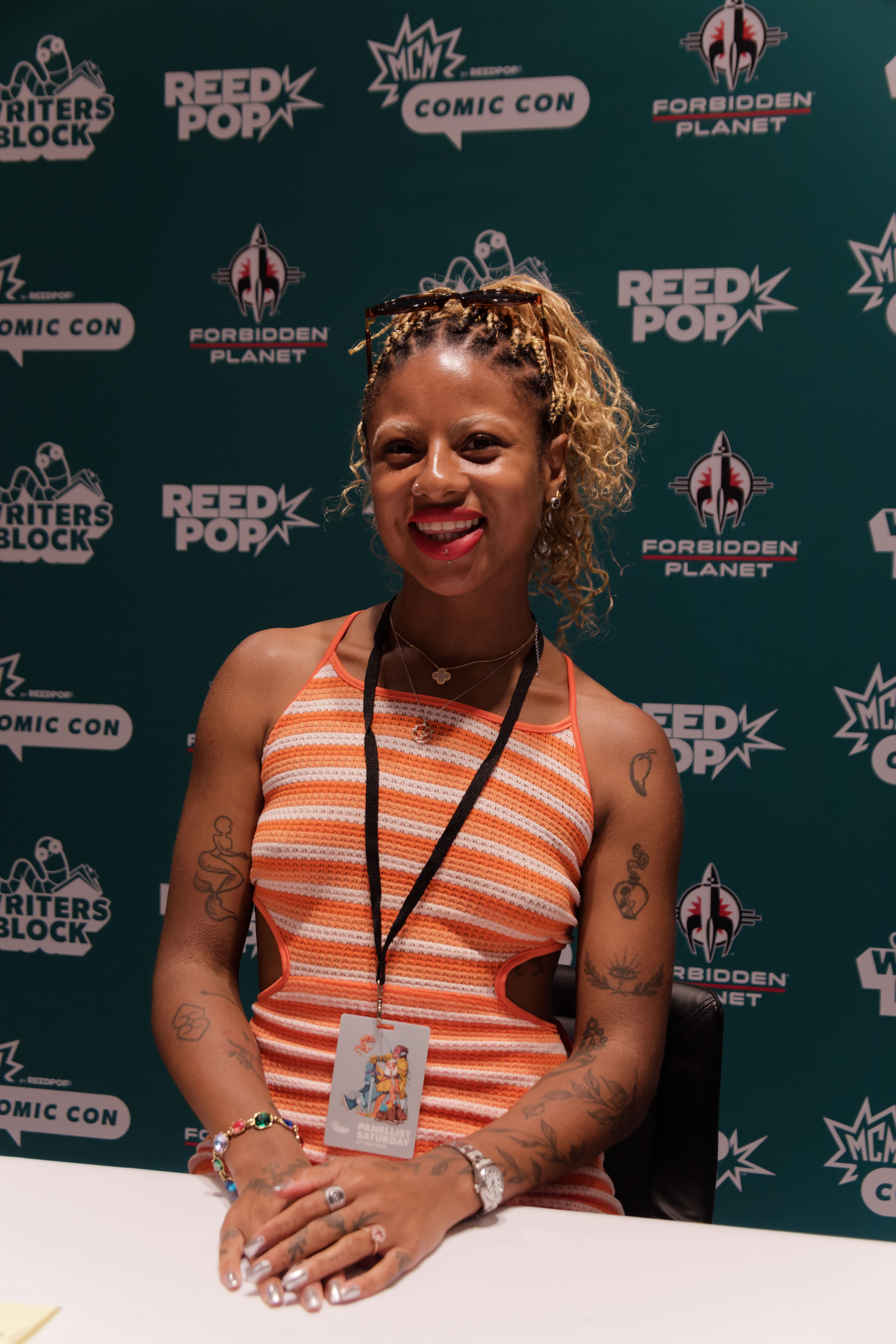
- McLeod at the 2026 MCM London Comic Con
- Born: Ella Sade McLeod; 16 March 1996 (age 30)
- Other names: E.S. McLeod; Ella McLeod
- Education: University of Warwick
- Years active: 2017–present

Ella Sade McLeod (born 16 March 1996) is an English writer and podcaster. In addition to young adult (YA) and children's fiction, she writes adult fiction under the name E.S. McLeod.

== Early life ==
McLeod grew up in Forest Hill, South London. Her grandmother arrived in England from Jamaica as part of the Windrush generation, settling in Clapham. McLeod earned a scholarship to attend Streatham and Clapham High School. She graduated from the University of Warwick with a degree in English literature and theatre studies. During her time at Warwick, McLeod became involved in slam poetry.

== Career ==
At the start of 2022, McLeod signed a three-book deal with Scholastic UK, through which she published her debut young adult (YA) novel Rapunzella, or, Don't Touch My Hair later that year. The novel combines a London teenager's coming-of-age story with her Rapunzel-esque fairytale dreams. Rapunzella, or, Don't Touch My Hair was longlisted for the Branford Boase Award. Also in 2022, McLeod began hosting the podcast Comfort Creatures with Alexis B Preston.

McLeod's second YA novel The Map That Led to You was published in 2024. This was followed by the picture book Goldilocs in 2025, illustrated by Rochelle Falconer.

It was announced in 2024 that McLeod would publish her debut adult novel Andromeda, a Greek myth retelling, under the name E.S. McLeod via Transworld in 2026.

== Personal life ==
McLeod is queer.

== Bibliography ==
=== Adult novels ===
- Andromeda (2026)

=== YA novels ===
- Rapunzella, or, Don't Touch My Hair (2022)
- The Map That Led to You (2024)

=== Children's books ===
- Goldilocs (2025)
