= Sarah Graley =

British cartoonist (born 1991)

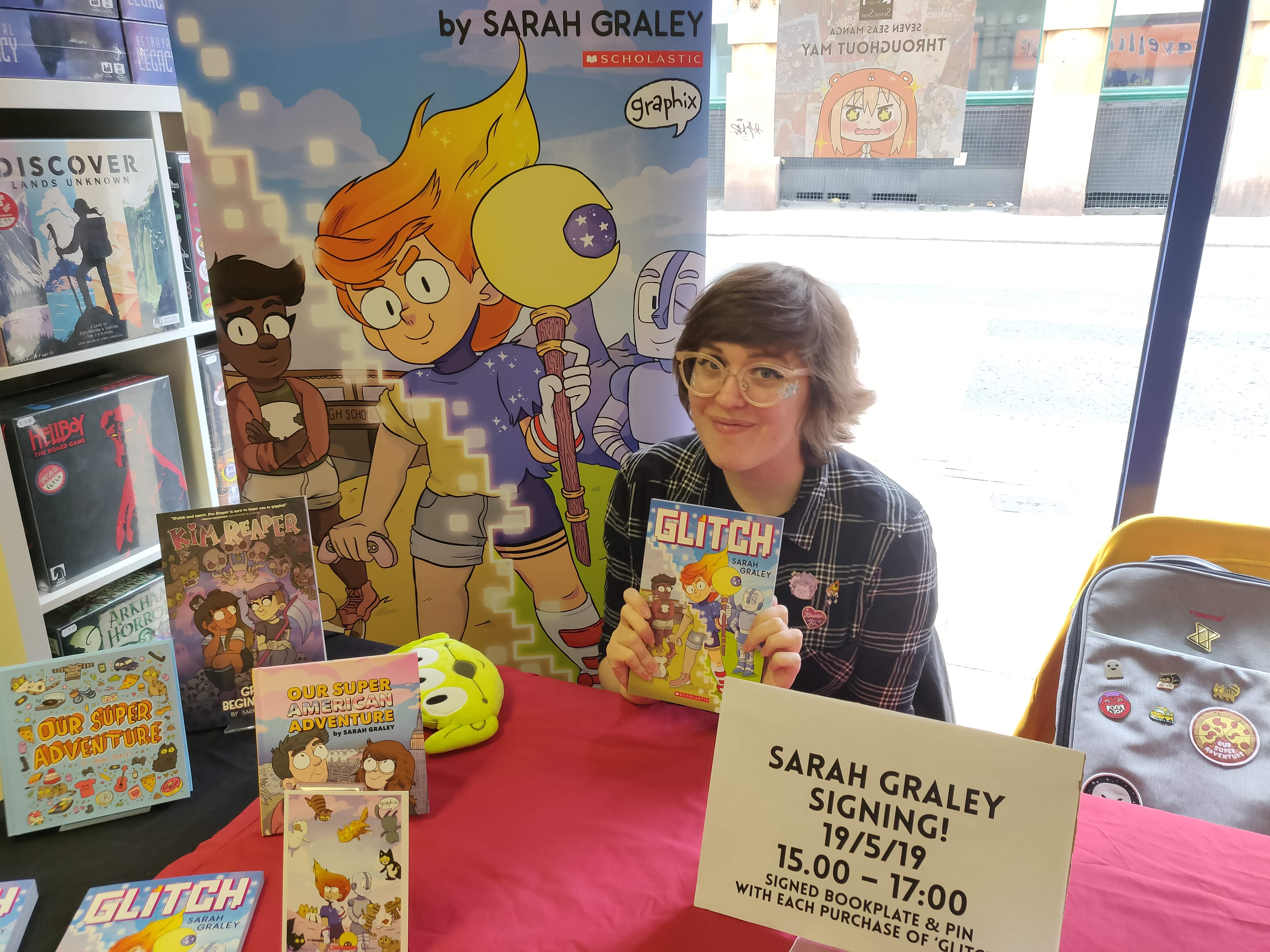
- Graley at a book signing event in 2019
- Born: Sarah Graley; 3 October 1991 (age 35) Northampton, England
- Areas: Cartoonist, Writer, Artist
- Notable works: Our Super Adventure; Donut The Destroyer; Minecraft; Glitch
- Spouse: Stef Purenins (m. 2024)

Sarah Graley (born 3 October 1991) is a British cartoonist, best known for the ongoing webcomic, Our Super Adventure, and for her work on comic series such as Kim Reaper, Glitch, Minecraft and Donut The Destroyer.

== Career ==
Graley graduated from the University of Wolverhampton with a BA (Hons) in Visual Communication (Illustration). During her studies, Graley started the webcomic series Our Super Adventure and self-published three small printed collections of comic strips between 2013 and 2015.

In 2015, Graley ran a Kickstarter project for a hardcover collection of 200 Our Super Adventure comics. It raised 450% of its goal. She has since gone on to publish four main volumes of Our Super Adventure comics, and three shorter travel comic collections.

Her first published comic work was the Oni Press miniseries Rick and Morty: Lil' Poopy Superstar (2016), a five-issue spin-off of the main Rick and Morty comic book series, of which Graley was the writer and illustrator.

Graley's original comic series Kim Reaper was released by Oni Press in 2017.

Graley's first middle grade graphic novel Glitch was released by Scholastic Graphix in 2019.

Graley was the artist on the first official Minecraft graphic novel, Minecraft Vol. 1, which was published by Dark Horse Comics in 2019. Graley's was also the artist on two sequels; Minecraft Vol. 2, published in 2020, and Minecraft Vol. 3, published in 2021. Minecraft Vol. 1 was Dark Horse Comics' best selling graphic novel in 2020, 2021, 2022, and 2023 according to BookScan.

Graley's second middle grade novel Donut the Destroyer was co-created with her husband Stef Purenins, and it was released in 2020 by Scholastic Graphix.

Graley and Purenins co-created a webcomic called Bite + Subscribe! which was released online through webcomic app Tinyview from 2021 to 2023 and a print edition was self-published in 2022 which was titled Bite + Subscribe Volume 1.

They also wrote a five-issue arc of the IDW comic book series, Marvel Action Spider-Man, which was released in 2021.

In 2022, Graley and Purenins started a YouTube channel dedicated to simple animated versions of Our Super Adventure comic strips. As of June 2024, the channel has over 300,000 subscribers, and total video views of over 126 million.

== Music ==
In 2012, Graley and Purenins formed a band which they named Sonic the Comic, after the UK's official Sega comic of the 1990s. The band is still together and their last album, "Stabatha EP", was released in July 2016. The band's albums were only ever released physically in an extremely limited quantity but they are still available to listen to digitally.

The band's four available albums are titled: Pixel (November 1, 2013), Reveries EP (August 5, 2014), Atoms (May 4, 2015), and Stabatha EP (July 4, 2016). The band's genre is a mixture of indie-pop and pop-punk.

== Awards ==
- 2015 British Comic Awards nomination for Emerging Talent
- 2016 Diamond Gem Award nomination for Best Licensed Comic of the Year - Rick and Morty - Lil' Poopy Superstar
- 2016 Diamond Gem Award nomination for Best New Comic Book Series - Rick and Morty - Lil' Poopy Superstar
- 2019 Kids' Comic Award win for Most Epic Adventure - Glitch

== Bibliography ==
=== Graphic novels ===
- Rick and Morty: Lil' Poopy Superstar (2017, Oni Press, ISBN 978-1620103746)
- Kim Reaper: Grim Beginnings (2018, Oni Press, ISBN 978-1620104552)
- Kim Reaper: Vampire Island (2019, Oni Press, ISBN 978-1620106372)
- Glitch (2019, Scholastic Graphix, ISBN 978-1338174519)
- Minecraft Vol. 1 (2019, Dark Horse Comics, ISBN 978-1506708348)
- Donut the Destroyer (2020, Scholastic Graphix, ISBN 978-1338541922)
- Minecraft Vol. 2 (2020, Dark Horse Comics, ISBN 978-1506708362)
- Minecraft Vol. 3 (2021, Dark Horse Comics, ISBN 978-1506725802)

=== Comic collections ===
- Our Super Adventure (2015, ISBN 978-0993384325)
- Our Super American Adventure (2017, ISBN 978-0993384356)
- Our Super Adventure: Press Start To Begin (2019, Oni Press, ISBN 978-1620105825)
- Our Super Adventure: Video Games and Pizza Parties (2019, Oni Press, ISBN 978-1620106464)
- Our Super American Adventure: An Our Super Adventure Travelogue (2019, Oni Press, ISBN 978-1620106754)
- Our Super Canadian Adventure: An Our Super Adventure Travelogue (2019, Oni Press, ISBN 978-1620106730)
- Our Super Adventure Travelogue Collection: America and Canada (2019, Oni Press, ISBN 978-1620106778)
- Our Super Adventure: Cute! (2020, ISBN 978-0993384370)
- Bite + Subscribe! Volume 1 (2022, ISBN 978-0993384387)
- Our Super Adventure: Cats & Snacks! (2023, ISBN 978-0993384394)
- Our Super Japanese Adventure (2023, ISBN 978-1739494711)

=== Comic books ===
- Invader Zim #26 (2017)
- Marvel Action Spider-Man #1 (2021)
- Marvel Action Spider-Man #2 (2021)
- Marvel Action Spider-Man #3 (2021)
- Marvel Action Spider-Man #4 (2021)
- Marvel Action Spider-Man #5 (2021)

=== Other publications ===
- Pizza Witch (2017, ISBN 978-0993384349)
- Pizza Witch: Deluxe Edition (2017, ISBN 978-0993384349)
