= Eternal Strands =

2025 video game

- Developer: Yellow Brick Games
- Publisher: Yellow Brick Games
- Directors: Mike Laidlaw; Frederic St-Laurent
- Artist: Sebastien Primeau
- Writer: Kate MacMullin
- Composer: Austin Wintory
- Engine: Unreal Engine 5
- Platforms: Microsoft Windows; PlayStation 5; Xbox Series X/S
- Release: January 28, 2025
- Genre: Action-adventure
- Mode: Single-player

Eternal Strands is a 2025 action-adventure game developed and published by Yellow Brick Games. The game was released for PlayStation 5, Windows, and Xbox Series X/S on January 28, 2025. It received generally positive reviews from critics.

== Gameplay ==
Eternal Strands is an action-adventure video game played from a third-person perspective. In the game, the player assumes control of Brynn, a warrior who is on a quest to search for the secrets of a long-lost civilization known as the Enclave. The player has the ability to manipulate elements and temperature using a magical cloak. Freezing enemies can slow them down, while burning them cost them health. The player's manipulation of temperature will also alter the game's world. Frequent usage of fire abilities will cause an area to become arid, and may result in fires that can spread rapidly in the game's vegetation. Brynn also has access to telekinetic powers, allowing her to perform feats such as hurling objects at enemies. These magical abilities can also be used for exploration. Brynn can construct bridges using ice, burn obstacles, or use telekinetic skills to launch herself across great distance. Brynn can also climb any surface found in the game's world.

As player progresses, they will encounter nine distinct bosses that roam in different parts of the game's world. Players are often required to fight these bosses while climbing on them in order to strike their weak points. Once a boss is defeated, players will be rewarded with a new magical ability that can be used for exploration or combat.

== Development ==
Yellow Brick Games was founded in early 2020 by Mike Laidlaw and several other developers from Ubisoft, in particular its Quebec studio. Shadow of the Colossus (2005), Dragon's Dogma (2012), and The Legend of Zelda: Breath of the Wild (2017) and Tears of the Kingdom (2023) were important inspirations for gameplay, while European visual novels influenced the game's art style. With its physic-based combat system, the studio aimed to make players feel like they are a "fantasy superhero" while playing the game. The game was created with Unreal Engine 5, and the team had about 68 people.

== Release ==
Yellow Brick Games partnered with Private Division to publish the game in 2022, though it was revealed in March 2024 that the studio will self-publish the title. The game was officially announced in April 2024, and was released for PlayStation 5, Windows, and Xbox Series X/S on January 28, 2025. The first post-launch update for the game will introduce a new creature, armor and weapon set designed by Yusuke Mogi from Square Enix's Creative Studio III. It was made available at launch to PC Game Pass and Xbox Game Pass Ultimate subscribers at no additional cost.

== Reception ==
Reception

Aggregate scores
Aggregator	Score
Metacritic	(PC) 77/100 (PS5) 69/100 (XSXS) 76/100
OpenCritic	61% recommend

Review scores
Publication	Score
Eurogamer	4/5
IGN	7/10
PC Gamer (US)	86/100

Eternal Strands received "generally favorable" reviews from critics for the PC and Xbox Series X/S versions, while the PS5 version received "mixed or average" reviews, according to review aggregator website Metacritic. Fellow review aggregator OpenCritic assessed that the game received fair approval, being recommended by 61% of critics.

PC Gamer enjoyed the freedom elemental abilities offered to the player, writing that it felt "natural and improvised". Eurogamer praised the monster encounters in the title, comparing them favorably to Shadow of the Colossus and the Monster Hunter series. IGN criticized the combat, calling it repetitive and noting that many of the small monster fights didn't "evolve in a substantial enough way" throughout Eternal Strands' runtime.
