= The Alters =

2025 video game

- Developer: 11 Bit Studios
- Publisher: 11 Bit Studios
- Director: Tomasz Kisilewicz
- Producer: Bartek Gwardiak
- Designer: Rafał Włosek
- Programmers: Szymon Kurek; Adrian Sawko
- Artist: Tomasz Cygan
- Writers: Katarzyna Tybinka; Magda Gamrot; Tomasz Kisilewicz
- Composer: Piotr Musiał
- Engine: Unreal Engine 5
- Platforms: PlayStation 5; Windows; Xbox Series X/S
- Release: 13 June 2025
- Genre: Survival
- Mode: Single-player

The Alters is a 2025 survival game developed and published by 11 Bit Studios. In the game, the player assumes control of Jan Dolski, a space miner who must create alternative versions of himself in order to survive on an inhospitable planet. It was released for PlayStation 5, Windows, and Xbox Series X/S on 13 June 2025, to generally positive reviews from critics. The game won Strategy/Simulation Game of the Year at the 29th Annual D.I.C.E. Awards.

== Gameplay ==
In the game, Jan must create Alters, alternate versions of himself who made different life choices, in order to survive.

In The Alters, the player assumes control of Jan Dolski, a builder working on the Project Dolly space expedition. Jan needs to pilot a massive, wheel-shaped base along the planet surface to stay out of the range of the sun, which can kill him due to lethal radiation. It is a survival game in which players need to explore the planet and mine for resources and materials, which is essential for maintaining and expanding the base. Infrastructure, such as electricity pylons, must be built to provide power for mining equipment. Base expansion is similar to games such as Fallout Shelter and XCOM, with players being tasked to attach new rooms and modules to the base, advancing its capabilities and keeping its crew content. Each segment of the game is timed, as the sun will rise and obliterate the player's entire crew. One second of real-world time is equivalent to one in-game minute.

To survive and escape before sunrise, he must create "Alters" using a material known as Rapidium. Alters are alternate versions of himself who made different life choices, and therefore, have their own distinct skill sets, lifestyles and personalities. Using a system named the "Tree of Life", the original Jan can look at his own life path and choose which Alter to bring into life. Alters can offer solutions to the problems the player is currently facing. For instance, a scientist Jan may be able to help players to research new ways to navigate through the game's hostile environments. Each Alter has their own emotions, needs and fears, and players need to regularly check on their status. If left unattended, they may act rashly, resulting in unforeseen consequences. There is a maximum number of Alters a player can create in one playthrough.

== Synopsis ==
=== Characters and setting ===
Jan Dolski (Alex Jordan) is an unremarkable builder aboard an Ally Corp mining ship en route to a hostile, rare, triple-star world in search of the rare, newly-discovered element Rapidium, which has time-accelerating properties. Dolski accepted the mission to escape Earth, haunted by his mother's death, an abusive father, and a failed marriage to his ex-wife Lena, ruined by his insecurities and obsession with his regrets.

The ship crashlands on the planet for unknown reasons, leaving Jan the sole survivor on the distant, isolated and desolate planet, riddled with dangerous gravitational anomalies, environmental hazards, and an encroaching, scorching sun, with the wheel-shaped base serving as his only sanctuary.

The ship's quantum computer contains a detailed memory scan of the crew, including Jan, and can calculate points in history where Jan may have made different choices and become an alternate version of himself. Using the newly-found Rapidium and the quantum computer, Jan is able to generate rapidly grown clones, known as Alters, that represent versions of himself that made different choices at pivotal moments, such as Jan Technician, who stood up to his father when the original Jan ran away, creating a more gruff, assertive, and technically-abled Alter. Throughout the game, Jan is able to make several other Alters, including the career-driven Jan Scientist, Jan Miner, Jan Doctor, and Jan Botanist (all voiced by Alex Jordan), who have their own memories and distinctly different lives dictated by the alternate choice they made to the original Jan.

=== Plot ===
On approach to the unexplored planet, the Ally Corp mining vessel is catastrophically damaged by an unknown force, forcing an evacuation. Jan awakens alone on the planet's surface and discovers the team dead. He locates the base, but due to intense natural phenomena he struggles to contact help. A fragmented voice warns that sunrise will scorch his location in days, so he must make the base mobile.

While exploring the area, Jan discovers the highly coveted Rapidium, which will make Ally Corp prioritize his rescue. The voice instructs him to verify it by rapidly gestating an adult clone of a sheep (Molly). As Jan cannot operate the Base alone, the voice encourages him to use its quantum computer, which contains a scan of his memories, to create an Alter of himself by simulating a divergent life path, creating the Technician.

With the Technician's help, the base moves, and communication clears. Jan learns the voice belongs to Lucas Peña, a space traffic controller. Lucas admits his boss, Maxwell, suggested creating the Alter, an ethically illegal act, to ensure the recovery of the Rapidium, which could revolutionize humanity. The base halts at an impassable lava pit. Jan creates more Alters to help, including the Scientist, Doctor, Miner, and Botanist. The Scientist develops a remote bridge, enabling progress.

They are soon stopped by a colossal gravitational anomaly. Meanwhile, Molly the sheep suddenly dies. An autopsy reveals a brain mutation caused by its rapid gestation. Scans show all Alters are afflicted and will also soon die. Jan confers separately with Maxwell, and his ex-wife Lena (who works for Ally Corp) for help: Maxwell suggests creating an Alter with no memories—avoiding the mutation—and fatally harvesting its tissue; Lena offers a neural implant design, which will expose the Alters' existence to Ally Corp. Either option upsets the Alters. Lena's suggestion also exposes Maxwell's involvement, resulting in his and Lucas's firing and the intervention of Ally Corp COO Agatha, who reveals that Maxwell is a disgraced scientist responsible for a deadly memory manipulation project. Lucas later confesses he knew about Maxwell, but kept quiet out of fear.

After the gravitational anomaly is neutralized, the Technician betrays Jan, knocking him unconscious. He and a group of dissenting Alters flee in a secretly repaired ground vehicle. Jan regains consciousness to find the base in transit, lost in a sandstorm, and on the brink of collapse. Desperate, he uses the quantum computer to manipulate his memories to become a better leader. In a surreal desert mindscape, he encounters the Stranger, a manifestation of his subconscious, who can help Jan accept himself and reveals the quantum computer saved him over his crew because it calculated he had the highest chance of leading the mission to success.

Reinvigorated, Jan suggests navigating the sandstorm by tracking the rebel Alters' vehicle. He locates them in a barren wasteland and builds a beacon to signal the rescue team. However, the signal is blocked by a massive planetary anomaly which also caused the original crash. He and the Scientist discover a tree-like structure existing out of phase with their reality and construct a device to bring it into their world, allowing Jan to destroy it and activate the beacon. Maxwell or Agatha insist the Alters' existence is concealed, so they construct a fake Rapidium storage unit to smuggle themselves back in suspended animation. Jan can optionally attempt to reunite with the rebel Alters before the rescue team arrives and the survivors and Rapidium are returned to Earth.

The ending varies based on the player's choices. If Jan sides with his Alters, he commandeers the rescue ship and returns to Earth, allowing them to escape, but is put on trial for various crimes. Supporting Maxwell results in him hoarding the Rapidium for his illicit experiments, and coercing Jan's cooperation. If Jan sides with Agatha, he becomes the unhappy public face of Ally Corp's Rapidium recovery. Helping either, or failing to commandeer the rescue ship, leads to the Alters being captured, their fate unknown. Lena may either reconnect with Jan or sever ties permanently. Depending on events, she might be promoted or face trial herself for aiding him. If Lucas helps Jan seize the ship, he too goes on trial but finds peace in having done the right thing. The Scientist can remain on the planet to study a hidden oasis, and the Botanist can assume Jan's identity while he vanishes with the surviving Alters. Should Jan recover enough Rapidium, small start-ups begin using it to address Earth's global food shortage. In all endings, Jan receives a coded message from "J".

==== The Last Variable ====
The Scientist awakens in an underground bunker to find an older version of himself. He realizes he is a clone created by the dying Scientist to continue his research. Before dying, the older Scientist tells him to be better. The Scientist is then briefed by JanBot, an artificial intelligence based on the original Scientist's fractured mind. JanBot explains that the planet's surface-scorching hot cycles last for thirteen years, preventing the original Scientist from studying the planet's untouched Oasis in detail before age began to affect him. Instead, he developed a cryo-sleep chamber to preserve his clone through each hot cycle. The Scientist creates Alters of himself for assistance: the Physicist, Chemist, Biologist, and Geologist.

Through exploration and research, the Scientist and his Alters discover Phased Rapidium and Phased Minerals that, when combined with Rapidium, can terraform the planet's barren surface, gradually expanding the Oasis and its immunity to the hot cycles. The Scientist also builds field labs, allowing his Alters to witness the "Zero Event" by living through the hot cycles and observing their effects on the surrounding environment. At the end of each cycle, when the Scientist emerges from cryostasis, the aged field lab Alters brief him on events, but, to his bewilderment, each refuses to return to the bunker, preferring to live out their lives on the surface. Eventually, he discovers that areas protected from the sun are shielded by a Rapidium-created singularity that generates zero point energy from a quantum vacuum. He realizes that Rapidium can therefore be used to generate infinite energy as well as manipulate the universe. JanBot instructs him to create a zero-point energy generator but warns him of the "variable".

The Scientist builds and activates the generator, causing a space-time collapse that reverses the terraforming beyond the Oasis and rapidly ages him into an old man. He returns to the bunker to find it abandoned and discovers duplicate versions beneath it. Confronting JanBot, he learns that he is the 319th iteration of the original Scientist and that nearly 20,000 years have passed since the first. JanBot explains that the truth was hidden from each Scientist because his ego would not allow him to accept being merely one iteration contributing to a future Scientist's success. The Scientist himself is the variable, with each iteration bringing them closer to perfecting the generator.

JanBot offers the Scientist a choice: create a new Scientist to continue the research or break the cycle. If he chooses the latter, he deactivates JanBot and dies peacefully while appreciating the beauty of the Oasis.

== Development and release ==
The Alters was developed by Polish game developer 11 Bit Studios, which had previously worked on This War of Mine and Frostpunk. The game was revealed by 11 Bit Studios in June 2022 during the PC Gaming Show 2022. It was released for PlayStation 5, Windows, and Xbox Series X/S on 13 June 2025. The game was made available at launch to PC Game Pass and Xbox Game Pass Ultimate subscribers at no additional cost. The game is developed using Unreal Engine 5.

Lead artist Tomasz Kisilewicz explained to the press that the game was influenced by psychological thrillers, and went on to describe The Alters as a "weird game". While he described collecting resources as "the very base" of the game's economy, time was the game's most precious resource. While there are multiple ways for players to solve a certain problem, they would not have time to perform every task and therefore, must think strategically and prioritize their goals. The game play was inspired by Satisfactory. The original idea for the game was to have players building and running a base in space by creating various copies of himself. The story of the game, which focused on how life choices and decisions may have led to very different outcomes, was created to supplement the setting. The team wanted these life choices to be relatable, as they are also commonly faced by people in real life. According to the studio, "each Alter has a very carefully prepared personality and story that the player can interact with while playing".

After the game's release, players discovered leftover AI prompts in subtitles and flavor text, implying LLM use, despite failing to declare this on their Steam storefront page as mandated by Valve Corporation. 11 Bit responded to the controversy, confirming "AI-generated assets were used strictly as temporary WIPs during the development process". The assets were intended to be removed before launch.

In December 2025, 11 Bit Studios released a free update for the game, introducing a Relax Mode as well in the game to let players enjoy the story aspect of the game and not get too worried about the survival and management parts of it, as well as a new storyline, a new room, and a playable card game. An expansion for the game, titled Last Variable, was released on July 13, 2026. Featuring a 20-hour-long campaign, the expansion follows Jan Scientist who stays behind on the planet, and introduces four additional Alters.

== Reception ==
=== Critical response ===
Reception

Aggregate scores
Aggregator	Score
Metacritic	(PC) 85/100 (PS5) 83/100 (XSXS) 86/100
OpenCritic	95% recommend

Review scores
Publication	Score
Digital Trends	4/5
Eurogamer	4/5
GameSpot	8/10
GamesRadar+	4.5/5
IGN	8/10
PC Gamer (US)	90/100
PCGamesN	5/10
Push Square	8/10

The Alters received "generally favorable" reviews from critics, according to review aggregator Metacritic. OpenCritic determined that 95% of critics recommended the game.

Eurogamer noted in their review that The Alters requires "perseverance", but sticking with it pays off. They praised the game's merging of ideas as original. IGN praised the simple resource and management mechanics.

=== Sales ===
As of July 8, 2025, 11 Bit Studios reported that The Alters had sold over 280,000 copies across all platforms since its launch on June 13, 2025.

=== Accolades ===
Year	Award	Category	Result	Ref.
2024	Gamescom Awards	Gameplay	Nominated	
2024	Gamescom Awards	Best Xbox Game	Nominated	
2024	Gamescom Awards	Best PC Game	Nominated	
2025	43rd Golden Joystick Awards	Best Lead Performer (Alex Jordan)	Nominated	
2025	43rd Golden Joystick Awards	PC Game of the Year	Nominated	
2025	The Game Awards 2025	Best Sim/Strategy Game	Nominated	
2026	15th New York Game Awards	Great White Way Award for Best Acting in a Game (Alex Jordan)	Nominated	
2026	29th Annual D.I.C.E. Awards	Strategy/Simulation Game of the Year	Won	
2026	24th Game Audio Network Guild Awards	Best Audio for an Indie Game	Nominated	
2026	24th Game Audio Network Guild Awards	Best Sound Design for an Indie Game	Nominated	
2026	22nd British Academy Games Awards	Game Beyond Entertainment	Nominated	
2026	22nd British Academy Games Awards	Game Design	Longlisted	
2026	22nd British Academy Games Awards	Narrative	Nominated	
2026	22nd British Academy Games Awards	New Intellectual Property	Nominated	
2026	22nd British Academy Games Awards	Performer in a Leading Role (Alex Jordan)	Longlisted	
2026	Develop:Star Awards 2026	Best Narrative	Nominated	
2026	Develop:Star Awards 2026	Best Original IP	Nominated	
2026	44th Golden Joystick Awards	Best Game Expansion (Last Variable)	Nominated	
