= Doug Cockle =

American actor and director (born 1970)

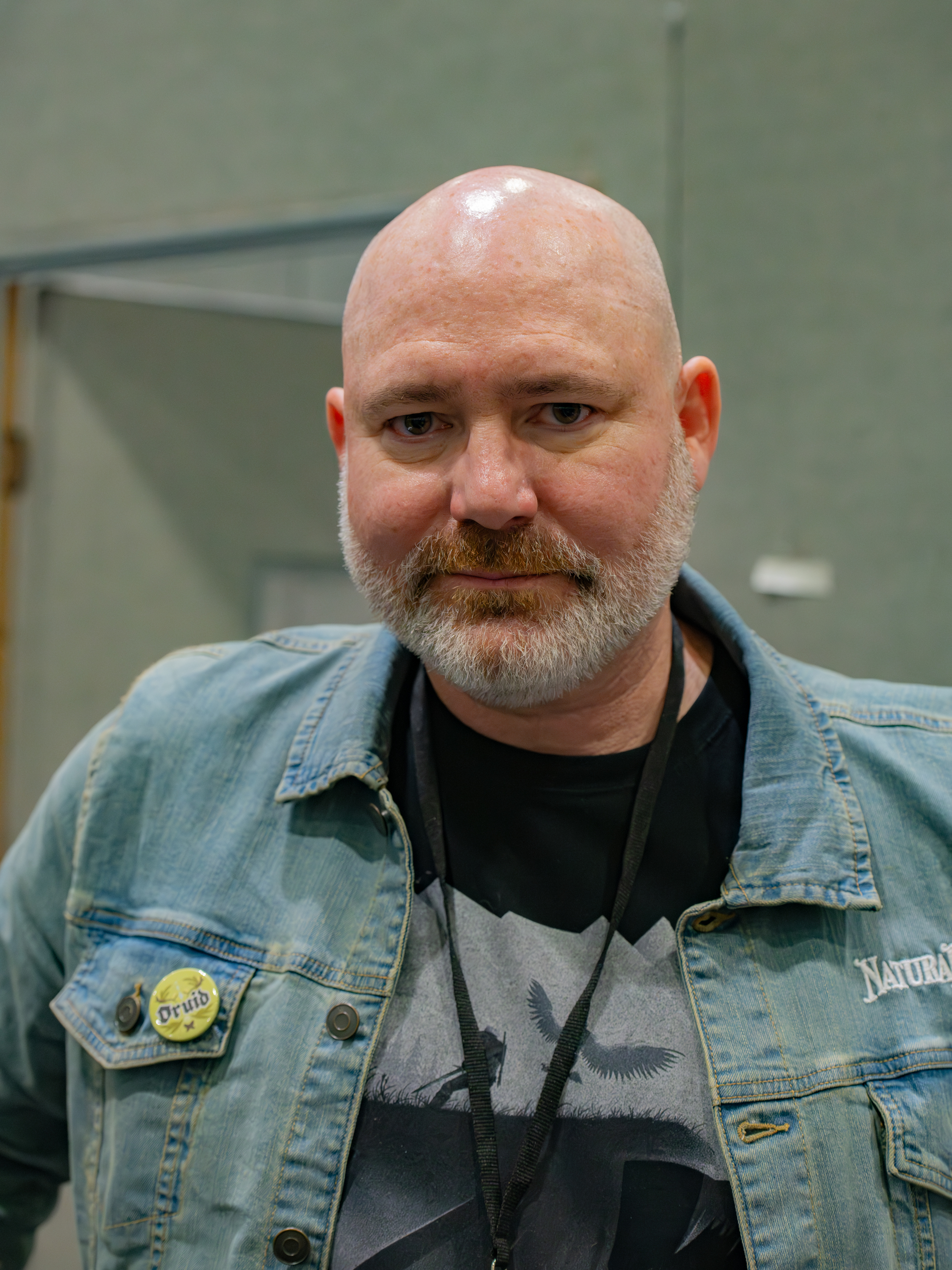
- At MCM Comic Con London, May 2025
- Born: Douglas Steven Cockle; September 16, 1970 (age 56); Twentynine Palms, California, U.S.
- Citizenship: United States; United Kingdom
- Education: Virginia Tech (BA)
- Occupations: Actor, director
- Years active: 2001–present
- Website: DougCockle.com

Douglas Steven Cockle (born 16 September 1970) is an American actor and director. Cockle is known for his voice-over roles in videogames, most notably of Geralt of Rivia in The Witcher series. He was nominated for a Game Award for Best Performance, a British Academy Games Award for Performer, and won Golden Joystick Award Best Gaming Performance for his portrayal of Geralt in The Witcher 3: Wild Hunt.

== Filmography ==
=== Film ===
Year	Title	Role	Notes
2001	The Tailor of Panama	Pentagon Aide	
2002	Reign of Fire	Goosh	
2004	London Voodoo	Lincoln Mathers	
2004	The Calcium Kid	News Reporter	
2005	Dot.Kill	Financial news anchor man	
2011	Captain America: The First Avenger	Young Doctor	
2014	Dark Noir	Vincent Black (voice)	Short film
2015	Survivor	Burly Worker #1	
2016	Criminal	Extraction Team Leader	
2022	Future TX	Dylan's Dad	
2025	The Witcher: Sirens of the Deep	Geralt of Rivia	Animated film
2025	The Amateur	CIA Security Agent	
2025	Predator: Killer of Killers	Einar	Animated film

=== Television ===
Year	Title	Role	Notes
2001	Band of Brothers	Father John Maloney	2 episodes
2003	The Second Coming	American Newsreader	Episode: "Episode #1.1"
2004	Murphy's Law	Quirrell	Episode: "Convent"

=== Video games ===
Year	Title	Role	Notes
2001	Independence War 2: Edge of Chaos	Cal	
2002	TimeSplitters 2	Additional voices	
2002	Twin Caliber	Sheriff Fortman	
2002	Archangel	Michael Travinsky / Ghost of the Monk	English dub
2003	The Great Escape	Additional voices	
2003	Chaser	Additional voices	
2003	AquaNox 2: Revelation	Hank Bellows	
2003	Conflict: Desert Storm II - Back to Baghdad	US Bradley	
2004	Urban Freestyle Soccer	Low Riders	
2004	Second Sight	Director Hanson	
2004	Yager	Magnus Tide	
2005	Perfect Dark Zero	Additional voices	
2007	The Witcher	Geralt of Rivia	
2010	Dead Nation	Jack McReady	
2011	The Witcher 2: Assassins of Kings	Geralt of Rivia	
2011	Driver: San Francisco	Police Dispatcher	
2011	The Book of Unwritten Tales	Nathaniel Bonnet	
2013	Dark	Eric Bane	
2015	Randal's Monday	Mel / Bob	
2015	The Book of Unwritten Tales 2	Nathaniel Bonnet	
2015	The Witcher 3: Wild Hunt	Geralt of Rivia	
2015	Victor Vran	Victor Vran	
2015	Blues and Bullets	Eliot Ness / Stranger	
2015	The Witcher 3: Wild Hunt – Hearts of Stone	Geralt of Rivia	
2016	The Witcher 3: Wild Hunt – Blood and Wine	Geralt of Rivia	
2017	Horizon Zero Dawn	Additional voices	
2017	Augmented Empire	Eugene Mund	
2017	SpellForce 3	Sentenza Noria	
2018	SMITE	Chernobog	
2018	State of Mind	Richard Nolan	
2018	RuneScape	Solak, the Grove Guardian	
2018	Arena of Valor	Richter / Riktor	
2018	Soulcalibur VI	Geralt of Rivia	English dub
2019	Monster Hunter: World	Geralt of Rivia	
2019	Euro Truck Simulator 2	Optional GPS Voice	
2019	Gibbous - A Cthulhu Adventure	The Butcher	
2019	Terminator: Resistance	Colin	
2020	SMITE	Totem Caller Hou Yi	
2020	Desperados III	The Baron	
2021	King's Bounty II	Aivar	
2021	War Mongrels	Ewald	
2021	Empires in Ruins	Sgt. Hans Heimer	
2021	Tails of Iron	Narrator	
2022	Arcade Paradise	Ashley's Father	
2022	God Souls	Chaos	
2023	Hunt: Showdown	John Victor	
2023	Baldur's Gate 3	Bhaal	
2023	Payday 3	Bile	
2023	Alan Wake II	Robert Nightingale	
2024	The First Descendant	Ajax	
2025	The Alters	Terrence Maxwell	
2025	Tails of Iron 2: Whiskers of Winter	Narrator	
2025	Dead by Daylight	Geralt of Rivia	Cosmetic outfit
2026	Emberville	TBA	
2027	The Witcher 3: Wild Hunt – Songs of the Past	Geralt of Rivia	
TBA	The Witcher IV	Geralt of Rivia	
TBA	Emberville	Unannounced role	In production

=== Web series ===
Year	Title	Role	Notes	Ref
2024-present	Natural Six	Kelnys		
