= Ben Starr (actor) =

English actor (born 1988)

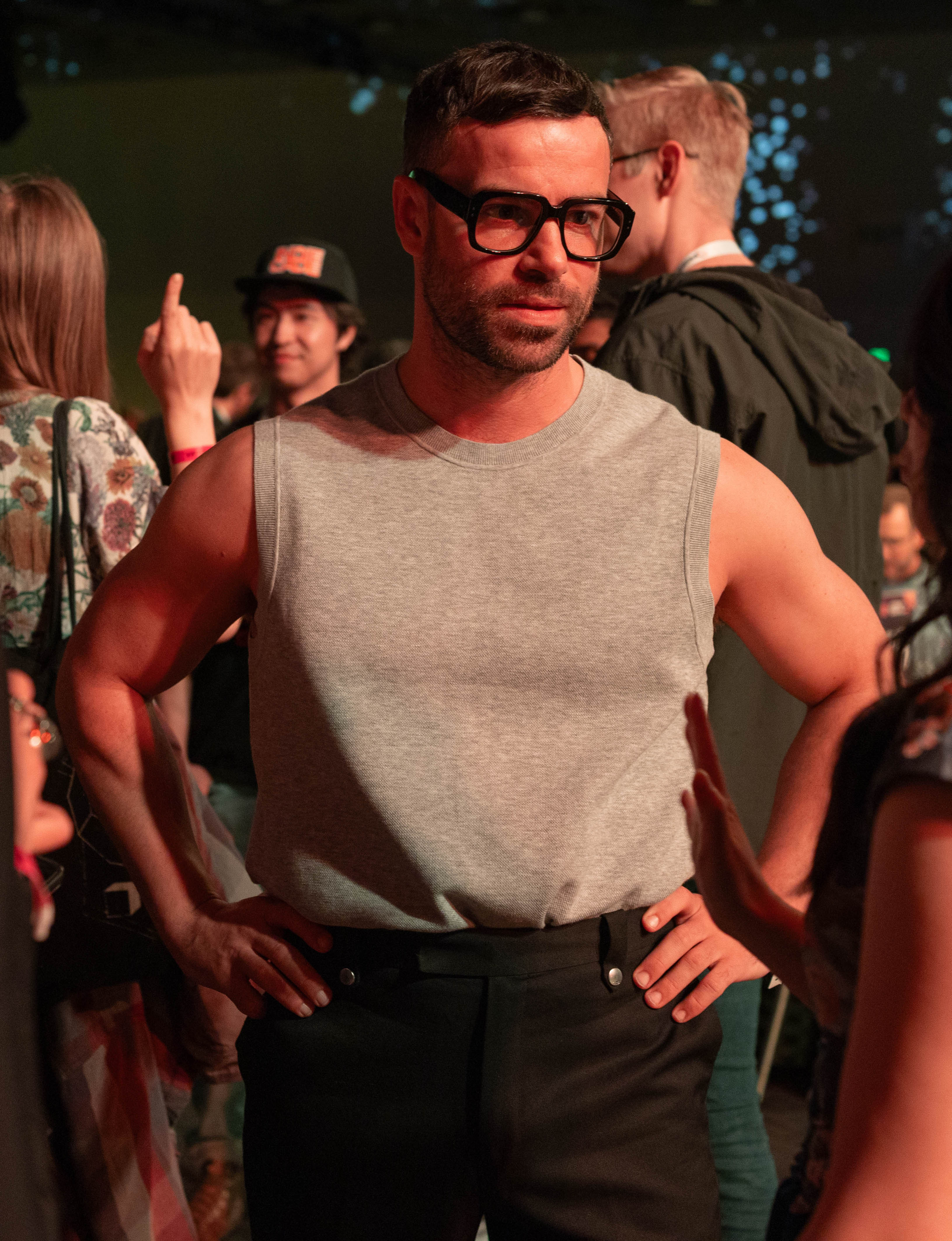
- Starr at the 2025 Game Developers Choice Awards
- Born: 1 April 1988 (age 38); Bristol, England
- Education: Durham University (BA); London Academy of Music and Dramatic Art (MA)
- Occupation: Actor
- Years active: 2013–present
- Spouse: Naomi Battrick

Ben Starr (born 1 April 1988) is an English actor, primarily known for his voice acting work in video games. After a string of minor roles, mainly on television, he had his breakthrough by virtue of portraying Clive Rosfield, the protagonist of the role-playing game Final Fantasy XVI (2023). This role earned him the award for "Best Lead Performer" at the Golden Joystick Awards 2023 and a nomination for "Best Performance" at The Game Awards 2023.

Starr has subsequently voiced many characters in video games, including Verso in Clair Obscur: Expedition 33 (2025), which earned him the award for "Best Supporting Performer" at the Golden Joystick Awards 2025, another nomination for "Best Performance" at The Game Awards 2025 and a nomination for Performer in a Leading Role at the 22nd British Academy Games Awards. The same year, he voiced Prometheus in Hades II.

== Biography ==
Starr was born in Bristol. He attended Queen Elizabeth's Hospital School and was captain of school 2005/6. While at school he was a member of Great Western Youth Theatre, Bristol Old Vic Youth Theatre and HTV Television Workshop. He studied history at Durham University and was president of Castle Theatre Company, a member of DULOG, as well as a founding member of DIM. On graduating from Durham he completed a two-year postgraduate acting course at the London Academy of Music and Dramatic Art (LAMDA).

== Career ==
His first role was in Father Brown in 2013, followed by Doctors in 2013, and The Musketeers in 2015. He played Captain James Hawdon in the BBC series Dickensian. In 2016, he had roles in Casualty as Nathan Mason and he starred in the role of Donatello in Medici: Masters of Florence. In 2017 he landed a recurring role as the Apothecary, Dr Christopher Priestley, in the Sky1 series Jamestown.

Starr voiced the main character Clive Rosfield in the role-playing video game Final Fantasy XVI, for which his performance was widely acclaimed and enriched his stardom in the video game industry. He also hosted the Golden Joystick Awards in 2024, after having won the award for Best Lead Performer the previous year. He reprised his role as a DLC character in the first season pass for the fighting game Tekken 8.

Starr would also go on to star as Jimbo when advertising the 2024 indie game Balatro. During the 21st British Academy Games Awards, he would reprise this role to accept the Debut Game Award on Balatro creator LocalThunk's behalf. Starr hosted the Magic: the Gathering panel at PAX East 2025 for the debut showcase for the Final Fantasy set. He voiced the character Verso in the 2025 video game Clair Obscur: Expedition 33. In 2026 he joined the cast of Fortnite as part of fictional organisation "The Seven", however his character was a disguise for "Geno", the main antagonist.

In May 2026, Starr announced that he will play the role of Tempest Bayor in the upcoming video game Soulframe, and will be debuting in the game's playable Pre-alpha version at TennoCon 2026.

== Filmography ==
=== Film ===
Year	Title	Role	Notes	Ref.
2015	Survivor	Sniper		
2015	Meet Pursuit Delange: The Movie	Pursuit Delange		
2016	A Great Personality is Just Skin Deep	Dan	Short film	
2017	Eat Locals	Private Crown		
2018	7 Miracles	Judas		
2021	Sinking	Husband	Short film	
2025	Arriba Beach	Sam	Short film	
2025	Marathon	Durandal	Short film	

=== Television ===
Year	Title	Role	Notes	Ref.
2013	Father Brown	Adam Watkins	1 episode	
2013	Doctors	Paul Stammers	1 episode	
2015	The Musketeers	Francesco	1 episode	
2015–2016	Dickensian	Captain James Hawdon	17 episodes	
2016	Casualty	Nathan Mason	1 episode	
2016	Medici	Donatello	1 episode	
2017–2019	Jamestown	Dr. Christopher Priestley	24 episodes	
2019	Knightfall	Philippe	2 episodes	
2019	Midsomer Murders	Noah Moon	1 episode	
2021	Trying	Elliot	2 episodes	
2022	Death in Paradise	Chad Burinsky	1 episode	
2022	London Kills	Josh Hart	1 episode	
2022	The Other Half	Oscar	1 episode	
2023	You & Me	Harry	3 episodes	
2023	You	Niko Leandros	1 episode	

=== Theatre ===
Year	Title	Role	Venue	Ref.
2013	Yellow Face	Marcus G. Dahlman	Royal National Theatre, Park Theatre	
2013	Stop the play!	Camp gay director	Trafalgar Studios	

=== Video games ===
Year	Title	Role	Notes	Ref.
2013	Company of Heroes 2	Additional voices		
2016	Quantum Break	Additional voices		
2018	A Way Out	Additional voices		
2023	Final Fantasy XVI	Clive Rosfield	Also provided voice work for paid DLC released from 2023 to 2024	
2023	Arknights	Sharp		
2024	Atlas Fallen	Gauntlet Bearer (male)	Reign of Sand update	
2024	Warframe	Arthur Nightingale	1999 expansion	
2024	Tekken 8	Clive Rosfield	DLC guest character	
2025	The First Berserker: Khazan	Khazan		
2025	Clair Obscur: Expedition 33	Verso		
2025	Date Everything!	Dorian		
2025	Dead Take	Vinny Monroe		
2025	Hades II	Prometheus		
2025	Final Fantasy Tactics: The Ivalice Chronicles	Dycedarg		
2026	Marathon	Durandal		
2026	Fortnite	Geno		
2026	Ledgerbound	Cazian		
TBA	Solasta II	Rickard Colwall		
TBA	Fallen Fates	Arven		
TBA	Soulframe	Tempest Bayor		
TBA	Emberville	TBA		
TBA	Stronghold 4	TBA		
	Wonderful Neoran Valley	Iris		

=== Web series ===
Year	Title	Role	Notes	Ref
2023–2024	Abridgd… Too Far!	Various	4 episodes	
2024	GETTYS Live On Stage: Tim & Gia's Wedding	Announcer		
2024–present	Natural Six	Raidion Thornbear		

== Awards and nominations ==
Year	Award	Category	Nominated work	Result	Ref.
2023	Golden Joystick Awards	Best Lead Performer	Final Fantasy XVI	Won	
2023	The Game Awards 2023	Best Performance	Final Fantasy XVI	Nominated	
2024	New York Game Awards	Great White Way Award for Best Acting in a Game	Final Fantasy XVI	Nominated	
2024	20th British Academy Games Awards	Performer in a Leading Role	Final Fantasy XVI	Longlisted	
2025	Golden Joystick Awards	Best Supporting Performer	Clair Obscur: Expedition 33	Won	
2025	The Game Awards 2025	Best Performance	Clair Obscur: Expedition 33	Nominated	
2026	24th Game Audio Network Guild Awards	Best Ensemble Cast Performance	Clair Obscur: Expedition 33	Won	
2026	22nd British Academy Games Awards	Performer in a Leading Role	Clair Obscur: Expedition 33	Nominated	
