= Adam Badowski =

Polish video game director and entrepreneur (born 1975)

Adam Konrad Badowski
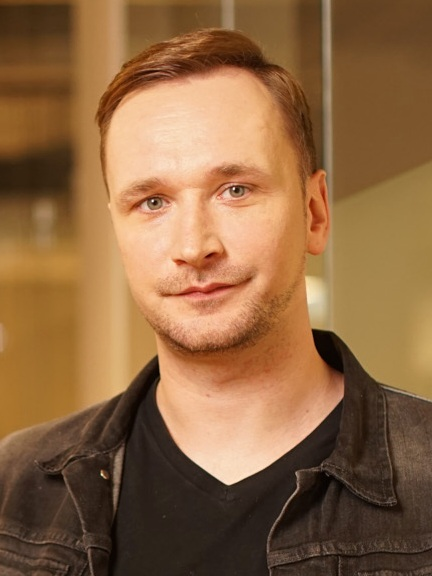
- Adam Badowski in 2019
- Born: October 19, 1975 (age 51); Łódź
- Education: University of Łódź
- Occupations: Businessman; video game director; publisher
- Title: Joint CEO of CD Projekt
- Spouse: Martyna Kryska-Badowska (m. 2018)
- Awards: Knight's Cross of the Order of Polonia Restituta

Adam Konrad Badowski (born October 19, 1975) is a Polish video game director, entrepreneur, and joint CEO of CD Projekt. Badowski has been a chief contributor to the visuals, narrative, and design of The Witcher and Cyberpunk video game series.

== Education and early work ==
Adam Badowski was born in Łódź. He studied philosophy at the Faculty of Philosophy and History at the University of Łódź but afterwards decided to pursue a career in computer graphics and design. In 1995, he began working as a graphic designer, among others at the Kolski and Partners Film & Advertising agency founded by Jan Jakub Kolski.

In collaboration with Krzysztof Ostrowski – frontman of the Cool Kids of Death alt-rock band – Badowski created animated music videos, including the 2002 video titled "Beware" (Polish: Uważaj), which received an award at the 2002 Yacht Film Polish music video festival for its innovative use of computer animation and the 2006 music video "Fumes" (Polish: Spaliny) awarded at the 2006 Yacht Film festival in the "animation" category.

== CD Projekt Red ==
Adam Badowski joined the newly established CD Projekt Red studio in 2002 as a graphic designer and animator, contributing to the studio's initial projects. Three years later he became head of the art department. In 2009, he took on the role of director of The Witcher 2: Assassins of Kings and joined the company's management board. In 2011, he became the head of CD Projekt Red, assuming responsibility for game production and the direction of the studio's development. In January 2024 he was appointed joint CEO of the company alongside Michał Nowakowski. Badowski is responsible for the creative vision of the studio and for managing creative teams at CD Projekt Red – he leads the Game direction, Story and Global art teams.

=== The Witcher game series ===
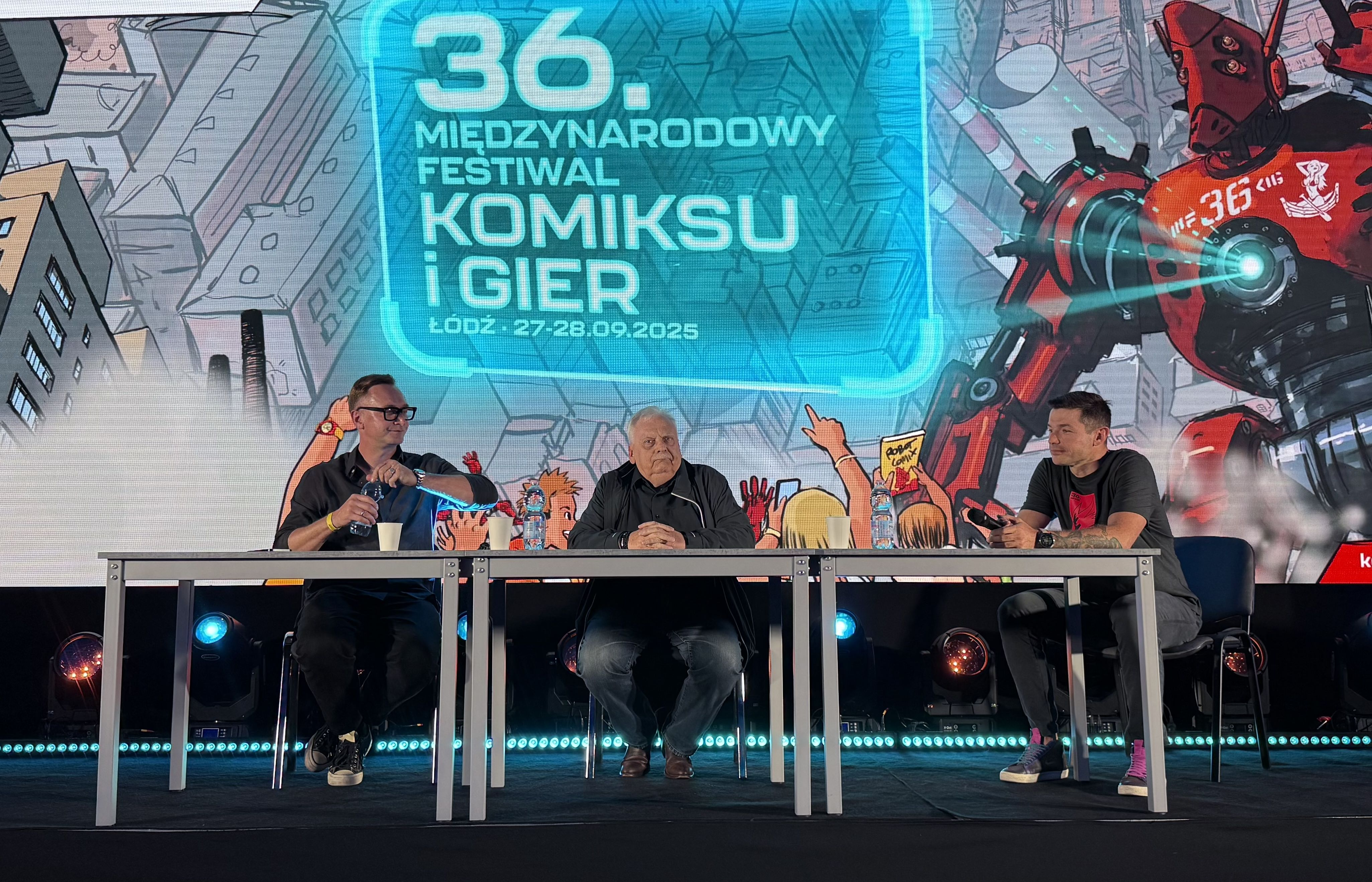
Adam Badowski and Andrzej Sapkowski during the 36th International Festival of Comics and Games in Łódź, 2025

As a 3D artist, he created concept art and supervised the work of the studio's branch in Łódź, which developed the first role-playing video game in the Witcher series, based on the short stories and novels by Andrzej Sapkowski. Badowski invited the artist Przemysław Truściński to shape the visual portrayal of the game's protagonist, Geralt of Rivia. The first Witcher game was published in 2007. As an animator working on the project, Badowski led the first motion capture sessions in Poland and was responsible for their execution, with an emphasis on animation realism, especially the reproduction of character movement physics.

Badowski was one of the main creators of the graphic concept and storyline of the studio's first two games: The Witcher and its sequel, The Witcher 2: Assassins of Kings, released in 2011. He participated in the work on the third installment in the series, The Witcher 3: Wild Hunt, further developing the narrative and artistic design. He co-created the expansions: The Witcher 3: Wild Hunt – Hearts of Stone and The Witcher 3: Wild Hunt – Blood and Wine; he participated in the production of the video game GWENT: The Witcher Card Game.

=== Cyberpunk 2077 ===
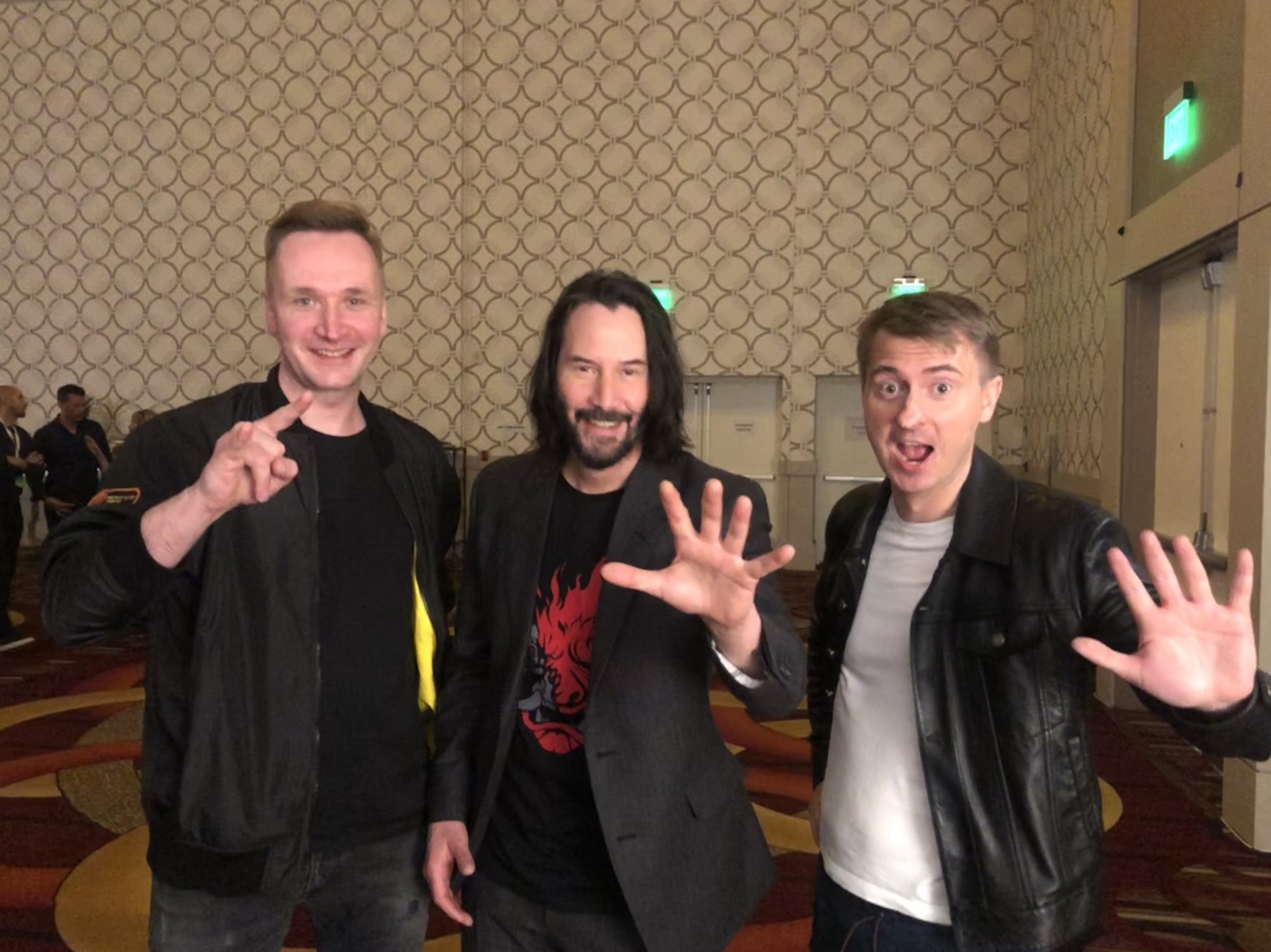
Adam Badowski, Michał Nowakowski and Keanu Reeves at an event prior to the Cyberpunk 2077 release, 2019

Badowski served as game director for Cyberpunk 2077, released in 2020. He was responsible for overseeing the production process, including the game's artistic and narrative aspects and coordinating the development teams. The title, based on a story system created by Mike Pondsmith, was one of the most anticipated projects in the studio's history.

=== Role in game projects ===
- The Witcher, 2007 – Head of Art;
- The Witcher 2: Assassins of Kings, 2011 – Game Director;
- The Witcher 3: Wild Hunt, 2015 – Head of Studio;
- Cyberpunk 2077, 2020 – Head of Studio, Game Director;
- Cyberpunk 2077: Phantom Liberty, 2023 – Head of Studio.

== Publisher ==
In 2023, Badowski, alongside Krzysztof Ostrowski and Bartosz Musiał, founded the "Nagle!" publishing house. By 2025 it has published several dozen comic book titles, including Do A Powerbomb by Daniel Warren Johnson, named "Foreign Comic of the Year" by Nowa Fantastyka magazine, Krzysztof Nowak's comic Futuro Darko, which won a Polish Comics Association award in the "Best Polish Comic" category in 2024, and the comic book America by Piotr Dumała.

== Honors and awards ==
- In 2011, he received the Śląkfa award from the Silesian Fantasy Club as Publisher of the Year.
- In 2013, he received the Knight's Cross of the Order of Polonia Restituta from President Bronisław Komorowski.
- In 2023, he was awarded a medal given to distinguished citizens of Łódź in recognition of their achievements on the 600th anniversary of the city.
