= The Molasses Flood =

American video game developer

The Molasses Flood LLC
- Type: Subsidiary
- Industry: Video games
- Founded: 2014
- Defunct: April 1, 2025
- Fate: Absorbed into CD Projekt Red Boston
- Headquarters: Boston, Massachusetts, US
- Key people: Forrest Dowling (Studio president)
- Parent: CD Projekt
- Website: themolassesflood.com (archived February 2025)

The Molasses Flood LLC was an American video game developer based in Boston, Massachusetts. Founded by industry veterans in 2014, the company was acquired by CD Projekt in 2021 and was absorbed into CD Projekt Red in 2025. The Molasses Flood developed independent games The Flame in the Flood and Drake Hollow. It was also working on a multiplayer spinoff of The Witcher series, codenamed Project Sirius, before the studio was shut down.

== History ==
The Molasses Flood was an American video game development studio based in Boston, Massachusetts. It was founded in 2014 by former employees of Irrational Games, Harmonix, and Bungie.

The Molasses Flood's first game was The Flame in the Flood, a survival game set in a post-apocalyptic river landscape, which was released in 2016 for Windows, macOS, Xbox One, PlayStation 4, and Nintendo Switch. The game received positive reviews from critics and players and was nominated for several awards. The studio's second game was Drake Hollow.

The company was acquired by CD Projekt in 2021. It then began working on a new game codenamed "Project Sirius" set in The Witcher universe in early 2022 in corroboration with CD Projekt Red North America. The game will include multiplayer elements. By March 2024, CD Projekt announced a significant write-off related to Project Sirius. Development on the game was rebooted and 29 employees from The Molasses Flood were laid off.

On April 1, 2025, the development team was officially absorbed into CD Projekt Red and The Molasses Flood ceased to be a separate legal entity. While the developers continue to work on Project Sirius, studio leadership, such as co-founder Damian Isla, left the company.

== Games developed ==
Year	Title	Platform(s)
2016	The Flame in the Flood	Windows, macOS, Xbox One, PlayStation 4, Nintendo Switch
2020	Drake Hollow	Windows, Xbox One
