= The Witcher Battle Arena =

Multiplayer online battle arena video game

- Developers: CD Projekt Red; Fuero Games
- Publisher: CD Projekt Red
- Series: The Witcher
- Engine: Unity
- Platforms: Android, iOS, Windows Phone
- Release: Android, iOS; 22 January 2015; Windows Phone; 2015
- Genre: Multiplayer online battle arena
- Mode: Multiplayer

The Witcher Battle Arena was a free-to-play multiplayer online battle arena (MOBA) video game developed and published by CD Projekt Red. The game released for Android, iOS, and Windows Phone devices in 2015, and was playable until the end of that year when the servers were closed.

== Gameplay ==
The Witcher Battle Arena was a multiplayer online battle arena set within the universe of The Witcher. The game made use of touchscreen controls. The game featured eight heroes—playable characters from the series—each with three skills. Additional content could be unlocked through microtransactions.

== Development and release ==
The Witcher Battle Arena was developed by Polish video game studios CD Projekt Red and Fuero Games using the Unity game engine. The developers opted to use a free-to-play and microtransaction system model for the game. The decision to create a MOBA spin-off was seen as an opportunity to expand The Witcher universe onto more devices.

The game was first showcased at the Electronic Entertainment Expo 2014. It was initially scheduled to be released in late 2014 on Android, iOS, and Windows Phone tablet and mobile devices. Android and iOS versions launched on 22 January 2015, and later that year on Windows Phone. Servers for the game were shut down on 31 December 2015.

== Reception ==
Reception

Aggregate score
Aggregator	Score
Metacritic	63/100

Review score
Publication	Score
TouchArcade	2.5/5

The Witcher Battle Arena received "mixed or average" reviews from professional critics according to review aggregator website Metacritic.
