= The Witcher: Monster Slayer =

2021 video game

- Developer: Spokko
- Publisher: Spokko
- Series: The Witcher
- Platforms: Android, iOS
- Release: July 21, 2021
- Genres: Role-playing game, geolocation-based mobile game

The Witcher: Monster Slayer (Polish: Wiedźmin: Pogromca Potworów) was a geolocation-based role-playing video game developed by Spokko, part of the CD Projekt group. The game was released for Android and iOS on July 21, 2021, and is a prequel to the main Witcher game series.

In late 2022, CD Projekt announced that the game would be shut down on June 30, 2023, after determining that the game did not live up to business expectations. The game would no longer be available for download after January 31 and all in-app purchases would be disabled by then. Some Spokko employees who worked on the game are expected to be laid off. The game was shut down as scheduled.

== Gameplay ==
In the game, players take on the role of a witcher. The game world is an image of the real world, which is supported by Google Maps. The player has to move around in the real world in order to move around in the witcher game world. The location is taken over by the location function of the end device. On the game world, the player will find all kinds of monsters, herbs or orders. Depending on the topography as well as the time of day or night, players will encounter different objects. Monsters from one of ten different classes appear in three different rarities: common, rare and legendary, with rarer ones being more dangerous and difficult to kill.

Players can choose to engage any monster that is within the immediate area in a one-on-one fight. As witchers, they have a sword, sign-casting and explosives at their disposal, all controlled with the touchscreen, in a manner similar to the Nintendo DS version of Deep Labyrinth, to defeat the monster they choose to engage, and must leverage the monster's weaknesses (such as choosing either fast or strong sword strikes) to inflict more damage and build up a critical hit meter for a chance to pass a quick-time event to inflict such hit for extra damage, while being careful to parry enemy attacks with the sword. Players also can craft oils and potions with portable crafting stations that require repair after overuse to gain advantages in combat, while bombs can be purchased, found or even crafted later on. In addition to individual battles, players can also meet characters, which then lead to small quests.

== Reception ==
Reception

Aggregate score
Aggregator	Score
Metacritic	72/100

The game received "mixed or average" reviews according to review aggregator Metacritic. The game reached over half a million downloads on the Play Store within three days of its release. By the time the game's shutdown was announced, over 100 million in-game monsters had been slain.
