= The Witcher Adventure Game =

- Developers: CD Projekt Red; Can Explode Games
- Publisher: CD Projekt Red
- Directors: Mateusz Kanik; Sebastian Stępień; Konrad Tomaszkiewicz
- Composers: Marcin Przybyłowicz; Mikolai Stroinski
- Series: The Witcher
- Platforms: OS X, Windows, Android, iOS
- Release: 27 November 2014
- Genre: Board game
- Modes: Single-player, multiplayer

The Witcher Adventure Game
- Manufacturers: CD Projekt Red; Fantasy Flight Games
- Designers: Ignacy Trzewiczek
- Publication: 26 November 2014
- Genres: Board game
- Players: 2–4
- Setup time: Several to a dozen minutes
- Playing time: 2+ hours
- Chance: Dice rolls, card draws
- Age range: 16+
- Website: https://www.thewitcher.com/kr/pl/classics

The Witcher Adventure Game (Polish: Wiedźmin: Gra przygodowa) is a Polish board game set in The Witcher universe, released in 2014 by CD Projekt RED in cooperation with Fantasy Flight Games. Its designer was Ignacy Trzewiczek. The game is intended for 2–4 players, who assume one of four characters known from the universe—Geralt, Triss Merigold, Dandelion, or Yarpen Zigrin—competing to gain the largest number of victory points by completing quests and defeating monsters.

In the same year, an electronic version of the game developed by CD Projekt Red and Can Explode Games was also released, constituting a digital adaptation of the board edition, published for Microsoft Windows, Android, and iOS.

The game received a mixed reception from reviewers, who primarily praised its atmosphere and references to the world of The Witcher, while pointing to limited interaction between players, randomness, and repetitive gameplay.

== Setting ==
The game is set in the The Witcher universe, created by Andrzej Sapkowski. The action takes place in a fictional world inspired by medieval Europe, inhabited by humans and numerous non-human beings such as elfves, dwarfs, and monsters derived from Slavic beliefs and European folklore. The universe is characterized by moral ambiguity, racial conflict, and the presence of magic as an element of everyday life. The game uses locations, characters, and narrative motifs known from the cycle, and players assume heroes operating on the margins of the social order, carrying out dangerous tasks in exchange for payment and fame

== Components ==
The physical contents of the game include a board depicting a map of the world of The Witcher, divided into connected locations that players move between during play. The box also includes four unpainted plastic miniatures of the heroes corresponding to the playable characters, and a set of six-sided dice (d6) with unique iconography, used among other things to resolve combat and random tests

A significant component of the contents are the cards, divided into different types such as quest cards, monster cards, and random event cards. The latter give the gameplay a narrative character and introduce variability to the situation on the board. In addition, the game includes numerous tokens used to mark character states (e.g., wounds or fatigue), quest progress, and current gameplay effects.

The box also includes a rulebook that describes in detail the rules of the game, the course of a turn, and the functioning of individual mechanics and game components.

== Gameplay mechanics ==
The game is intended for 2–4 players. Each assumes one of four asymmetric characters: Geralt, Triss Merigold, Dandelion, or Yarpen Zigrin—differing in special abilities, play style, and preferred ways of gaining victory points.

Each of the four playable characters has unique special abilities and a different way of earning victory points, which gives play an asymmetric character. Geralt brews potions and focuses primarily on fighting monsters (in which he is the best among the heroes). Triss Merigold uses magic, preparing spells and having abilities that affect cards and the course of quests; in the later stages of the game she also becomes powerful in combat. Dandelion avoids combat, easily earns money via the singing action, and bases his strategy on indirect interactions and scoring through narrative events (he can gain points when other characters near him gain them), whereas Yarpen Zigrin focuses on commanding his companions, managing resources, and the character’s economic development. These differences mean that players pursue different strategies despite using a common set of basic actions

Gameplay proceeds in turns. In each turn, a player performs two actions from available possibilities such as traveling between locations, conducting an investigation, developing the character, resting, or using the hero’s unique abilities. The available options are constrained by a shared pool of resources and a fatigue and wounds system, which forces planning the order of actions and periodic breaks for recovery.

The primary aim of the game is to gain as many victory points as possible, obtained mainly by completing narrative quests and defeating monsters. Quests are multi-stage and are tied to board exploration and random events represented by adventure cards. Combat with monsters is resolved using dice and cards that modify the result. Although this introduces randomness, players can partially control risk through developing skills and appropriate preparation

The game ends when one player completes a third main quest, after which the remaining players play a final turn, and the winner is the person with the highest number of victory points. The game’s mechanics emphasize players pursuing objectives in parallel, with relatively limited direct interaction, which makes gameplay resemble a race with elements of indirect rivalry

== Production and release ==
The game was designed by Ignacy Trzewiczek, illustrated by Damien Mammoliti, and published by CD Projekt RED and Fantasy Flight Games. In the same year, an electronic version of the game was also released (for Microsoft Windows, Android, and iOS), developed by CD Projekt Red in cooperation with the Can Explode studio. Both games premiered at similar times: the board game was released on 26 November, and the computer game one day later, on 27 November.

== Electronic version ==
The Witcher Adventure Game
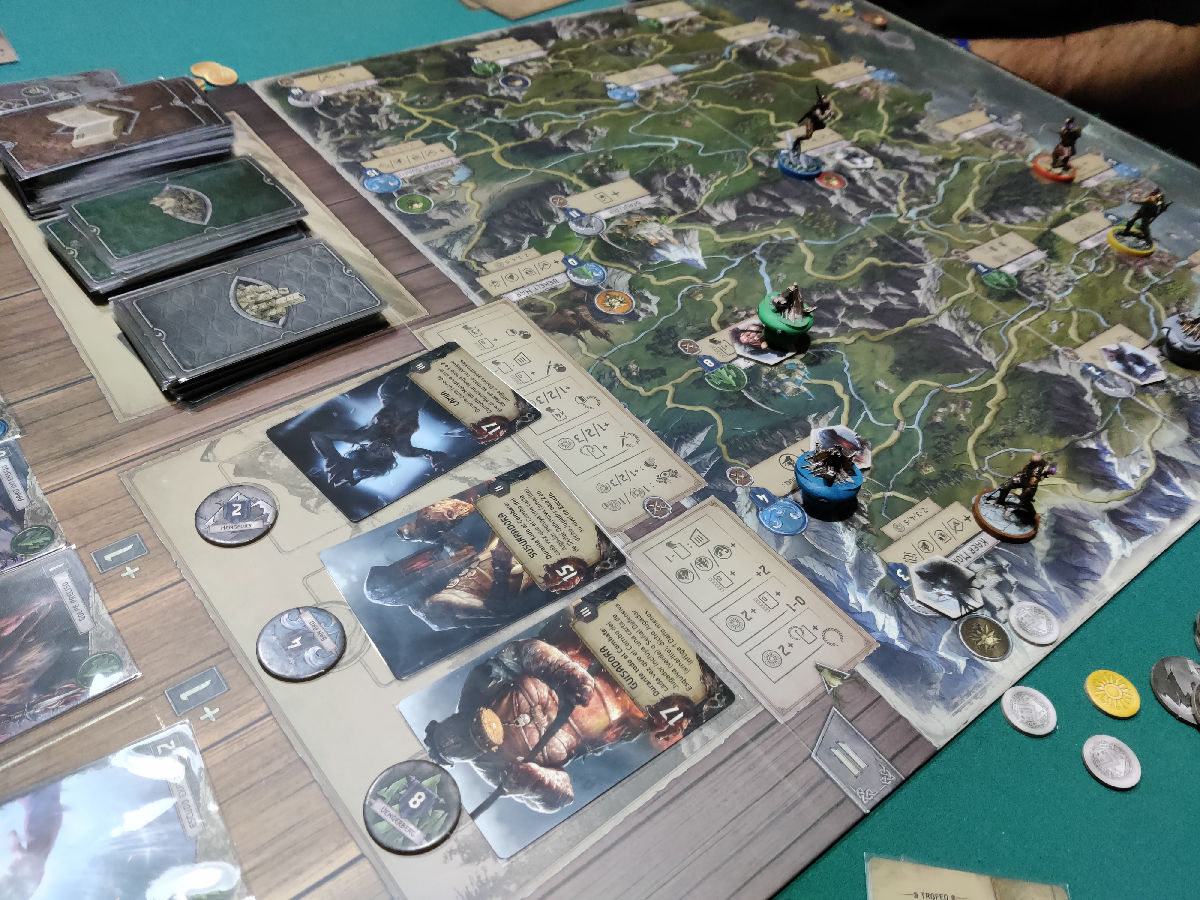
- Developer: Can Explode Games
- Publisher: CD Projekt
- Series: The Witcher
- Engine: Unity
- Platforms: Microsoft Windows, macOS, Android, iOS
- Release: 2014
- Genres: Adventure game, digital adaptation of a board game
- Modes: Single-player, Multiplayer

The electronic version, in English and Polish language versions, based on the Unity engine, was released for personal computers and mobile devices. A shared set of rules and mechanics was retained, adapting the interface to the specifics of individual platforms. The electronic version is a faithful adaptation of the mechanics known from the board edition, automating the handling of rules, combat resolution, assignment of card effects, and counting victory points, which reduces the need for players to manually track game state. The user interface presents a three-dimensional board and animated gameplay elements, and the course of a match is supported by tutorials introducing the rules of the game.

Significant changes compared to the board version include above all the expected possibility of single-player play (solo) with computer-controlled characters and a multiplayer mode with other players, not only in “hot seat” mode, but also via the Internet In addition, the electronic version officially enables adjusting the length of play by choosing the number of main quests (from one to five), allowing it to be shortened or extended relative to the standard board variant.

== Reception ==
Reception

Aggregate score
Aggregator	Score
Metacritic	PC: 68/100 (21 reviews) iOS: 65/100 (7 reviews)

Review scores
Publication	Score
Computer Games Magazine	7/10
IGN	6.9/10
Pocket Gamer	3.5/10
TouchArcade	3.5/5
Filmweb	6/10
GRY-Online.pl	8.5/10
Interia	80/100
Game Exe	6.5/10
Softpedia	7/10
PPE	8/10
Hardcore Droid	3/5
CD-Action	7

The game drew broad interest from reviewers, both in board game press and in portals dealing with computer and mobile games. This resulted from the recognizability of the The Witcher brand and the simultaneous premiere of the board and electronic versions. The board version received reviews, among others, in Board Times, The Dice Tower, Derp Storm, GamesFanatic, Nerdheim and Polter; similarly, the electronic version also received many reviews. Among the media that rated the game were CD-Action, Computer Games Magazine, Eurogamer, Filmweb, Game Exe GRY-Online.pl, Hardcore Droid, Hardcore Gamer, IGN, Interia, Oblicza Kultury, Pocket Gamer, PPE, Rock, Paper, Shotgun, Softpedia, TechRaptor and TouchArcade

=== Numerical scores and overall reception ===
Most reviewers rated the game as average or moderately successful; both clearly positive and clearly critical voices appeared. The board version most often received scores in the 6–7/10 range (Board Times, GamesFanatic, Nerdheim, Derp Storm<ref name=":52" />), while the Polter reviewer gave a clearly higher score (8.5/10), and the Board Times reviewer judged the game much more harshly in the case of advanced players. On BoardGameGeek the game has a rating of 6.3 (from 2,783 votes).

The electronic version was rated similarly, with results most often in the 3.5/5 and 6–7/10 ranges (CD-Action, Computer Games Magazine, Filmweb, Game Exe, Hardcore Droid, IGN, Pocket Gamer, Softpedia, TouchArcade), with rarer higher scores (GRYOnline, Interia, PPE); on Metacritic it received a 65–68/100 score (depending on platform)

=== Atmosphere and use of The Witcher universe ===
Among the elements most often praised were the atmosphere and numerous references to the world of The Witcher. Many reviewers praised the game’s embedding in the The Witcher setting, pointing to recognizable characters and elements of the world (Novigrad, Rivia, Kaer Morhen, etc.), as well as the narrative character of quest and event cards (Board Times, CD-Action, Derp Storm, GamesFanatic, Polter, Interia, GRYOnline, PPE, Softpedia). At the same time, some reviewers indicated that the gameplay mechanics are weakly tied to the universe and could function equally well as a generic adventure game in any other fantasy world (The Dice Tower, Filmweb, Hardcore Gamer, Rock Paper Shotgun).

=== Mechanics and the importance of player decisions ===
Reviewers mostly agreed in assessing the game’s mechanics as competent but not very original. Reviewers criticized the repetitiveness of actions and the schematic nature of quests as well as the limited number of strategic decisions (Board Times, GamesFanatic, Nerdheim, The Dice Tower, Filmweb, Game Exe, IGN, Hardcore Gamer, TouchArcade). On the other hand, some reviewers positively singled out the action economy system and the wound mechanics as elements that force planning and compromise (GRYOnline, Computer Games Magazine, Softpedia, Hardcore Droid, Filmweb).

=== Interaction between players ===
Limited interaction between players was one of the most frequently repeated critical remarks; reviewers in the large majority emphasized that players largely pursue their goals independently of each other and that direct competition is small (Board Times, GamesFanatic, Nerdheim, Polter, The Dice Tower, Eurogamer, Filmweb, Game Exe, IGN, Hardcore Gamer, GRYOnline). The GRYOnline reviewer suggested that the game might function better in a fully cooperative mode.

=== Randomness ===
Randomness (dice rolls, drawing cards and events) was assessed ambivalently: some reviewers considered it a typical and acceptable element of an adventure game (Derp Storm, Polter, Oblicza Kultury), while others criticized its strong impact on the outcome and on the player’s sense of control (The Dice Tower, GamesFanatic, Softpedia, Hardcore Gamer, TouchArcade, Pocket Gamer).

=== Diversity and balance of characters ===
Reviewers mostly noticed character diversity, but opinions on its quality were divided. The varied abilities of the heroes leading to diverse styles of play were praised (Board Times, GamesFanatic, Polter, GRYOnline, TechRaptor, Hardcore Droid). At the same time, some reviewers pointed to balance problems, especially the advantage of Geralt and Yarpen (Nerdheim, Filmweb, Softpedia, TouchArcade), as well as more complicated rules when playing the weaker characters Dandelion and Triss (GamesFanatic, Polter, TouchArcade); while some reviewers had different preferences—for example, the CD-Action reviewer considered Triss her favourite character (while agreeing that playing as Dandelion is the riskiest), and the Board Times reviewer considered Dandelion the most interesting character, though probably the weakest or hardest to play.

=== Game length, “downtime”, and replayability ===
Overly long sessions, waiting time between turns (“downtime”), and limited replayability stemming from repetitive actions and strategies were often criticized (Board Times, GamesFanatic, Nerdheim, Game Exe, Computer Games Magazine, IGN, Hardcore Gamer); although there were exceptions—the CD-Action reviewer specifically praised long play sessions. In the computer version, the ability to regulate game length in the electronic version was appreciated by many reviewers, including GRYOnline, Interia, Softpedia and TechRaptor.

=== Two-player mode and scaling with number of players ===
Although the game is advertised as intended for 2–4 players, some reviewers judged the two-player variant as weaker. The Polter reviewer indicated that with two players interaction is too limited, the game loses dynamism and tension, and the title works better with three or four players. Similar reservations regarding low interaction and parallel pursuit of goals (especially acute with fewer players) also appeared in other reviews of the board and digital versions (Board Times, Computer Games Magazine, The Dice Tower, Eurogamer, Filmweb, Game Exe, GamesFanatic, Hardcore Droid, Hardcore Gamer, Nerdheim, Polter).

=== Presentation, production, and usability issues (rulebook / interface) ===
The presentation and aesthetics of the game were often evaluated positively: in the board version reviewers praised the quality of components (including miniatures and the board), and in the digital version the board presentation, animations, and music (Board Times, GamesFanatic, Nerdheim, Polter, Interia, Filmweb, GRYOnline, PPE, Oblicza Kultury, Hardcore Gamer). Critical remarks concerned, among other things, the quality of some illustrations (Board Times), the readability of selected cards (Oblicza Kultury), and problems with readability and ergonomics of the interface in the digital version (Hardcore Gamer, Hardcore Droid).

=== Rulebook, entry threshold, and accessibility of the rules ===
Most reviewers positively assessed the quality of the rulebook and the overall readability of the game’s rules. Board Times praised the rulebook of the board version as well written and clear, enabling quick mastery of the rules. In the digital version reviewers pointed to helpful tutorials and rule automation, which made it easier to begin play (Eurogamer, Filmweb, Computer Games Magazine). At the same time, some reviewers pointed to a high entry threshold resulting from the number of mechanics and exceptions to the rules, which could discourage new players, especially in the electronic version (Softpedia, Pocket Gamer).

=== Component quality and production details of the board version ===
The quality of the physical elements of the game was usually evaluated positively, though with some reservations. The Board Times reviewer praised the hero miniatures and the d6 dice with unique iconography, but considered the card illustrations average. GamesFanatic and Nerdheim positively assessed the component quality as solid and adequate to the game’s price. Critical remarks by some reviewers (Board Times, Oblicza Kultury) concerned mainly the readability of some cards and uneven illustration quality, which occasionally hindered quick assimilation of information during play.

=== Digital adaptation: rule automation, tutorials, AI, and technical features ===
In reviews of the electronic version, attention was drawn to the convenience resulting from rule automation and easier “running” of the game (Computer Games Magazine, Filmweb, Pocket Gamer); in this context, as mentioned, the ability to shorten or extend the game length was appreciated. Eurogamer praised the tutorial and stability of the beta version. However, some reviewers criticized technical and functional issues such as long delays on AI turns and a lack of convenient solutions (IGN, Hardcore Gamer, Hardcore Droid), as well as technical problems and the lack of an ability to save, which, given the long solo game time, was considered a significant drawback (CD-Action, Softpedia, TouchArcade, Hardcore Droid). The Game Exe review additionally pointed to imperfections in the Polish language localization. The electronic version also has an expected soundtrack, although the CD-Action reviewer considered it “formulaic” and “tiring in the long run”; in the context of multiplayer she pointed to the lack of an option to add other players to a friends list.

Some reviewers emphasized that the digital version retains the character of a “virtual board game”, not fully exploiting the possibilities of the electronic medium. Rock Paper Shotgun and Hardcore Gamer noted that the game is a faithful but overly literal adaptation of the original, offering limited dynamism and little added value compared to the physical version. Hardcore Droid formulated similar conclusions, pointing to a mismatch between solid board-game mechanics and their inflexible implementation in the digital version.
