= CD Projekt Red Boston =

American video game developer

- Type: Subsidiary
- Industry: Video games
- Founded: 2023
- Headquarters: Watertown, Massachusetts, US
- Key people: Gabe Amatangelo (Studio president)
- Number of employees: 275 (2026)
- Parent: CD Projekt Red
- Subsidiaries: CD Projekt Red Vancouver

CD Projekt Red Boston is an American video game development company and a satellite branch of the Polish video game company CD Projekt Red. Founded in May 2023, the studio is located in Watertown, Massachusetts. The Boston studio focuses primarily on the development of future Cyberpunk franchise titles and serves as one of the company's major North American production hubs. The primary project associated with CD Projekt Red Boston is Cyberpunk 2, followed by continued work on Project Sirius.

== History ==
The Boston studio originated from CD Projekt acquiring The Molasses Flood in 2021. The Molasses Flood was a Boston-based independent studio founded in 2014, known for The Flame in the Flood and Drake Hollow. After the acquisition, the studio began work on Project Sirius, an experimental title in the universe of The Witcher that was to include multiplayer elements.

In October 4, 2022, CD Projekt Red announced that it would open a new studio in Boston, Massachusetts, and move the development of future Cyberpunk games to North America. The Cyberpunk 2 will be led by the Boston team and co-developed by the Vancouver and Warsaw studios. The studio will use Unreal Engine 5 for the new game. The Boston studio was opened in part because CD Projekt said that having development on the sequel to Cyberpunk 2077 handled in North America would help make the game more “authentically American.” In a company podcast, acting executive producer Dan Hernberg said that because Cyberpunk is “a uniquely American story,” it “seems right to do it in America.” Associate game director Paweł Sasko noted cultural and environmental details like types of manhole covers, street lights, trash bins, hydrants, and signage, that differed between Europe and the U.S., and said having a U.S.-based studio would help avoid such immersion-breaking mismatches. The company also indicated that establishing a Boston-based studio would give it access to the North American talent pool, especially developers unwilling to relocate to Europe, while also acknowledging that development costs in Boston will be higher compared to Poland. CD Projekt was approved for $2.1 million in state tax incentives in exchange for creating new jobs in Massachusetts. The company plans to expand its office space by roughly 9,100 sq ft, bringing the total to approximately 23,100 sq ft in Waltham.

Project Sirius by The Molasses Flood continued through a redefined scope after 2023. On April 1, 2025, The Molasses Flood was formally merged into CD Projekt Red, ending its existence as a separate entity; its personnel, leadership, and ongoing projects were absorbed into CD Projekt Red Boston.

In February 6, 2024, CD Projekt announced that Cyberpunk 2 is in early development at the CD Projekt Red Boston studio, led by Cyberpunk 2077 and Phantom Liberty veterans Gabriel Amatangelo, Paweł Sasko, Igor Sarzyński, Andrzej Stopa, Kacper Niepokólczycki, Sarah Grümmer, and Kacper Kościeński. The team is bolstered by Executive Producer Dan Hernberg, who previously worked on Amazon Games and Blizzard Entertainment; Design Director Ryan Barnard, former game director at Massive Entertainment and IO Interactive; Engineering Director Alan Villani, from the Mortal Kombat series; Lead Writer Anna Megill, known for Control; and writer Alexander Freed, known for Star Wars: The Old Republic. The game entered pre-production in May 2025.

By November 26, 2025, CD Projekt Red Boston expanded to over 80 developers, with roughly 90% of the staff consisting of senior-level developers, including former developers from Santa Monica Studio, Naughty Dog, Rockstar Games, Blizzard Entertainment and others CD Projekt stated that, after several years of building an experienced core team, it would begin hiring entry-level developers to support long-term expansion and create a more balanced staffing structure. CD Projekt announced plans to scale its North American studios, Boston and Vancouver, to more than 300 developers by 2027, up from approximately 135 in 2025. Around half of the planned development workforce is expected to be located in Boston, with the remainder distributed between Vancouver and Warsaw. CD Projekt Boston plans to hire over 141 employees in Greater Boston area alone over the next three years to help develop new games in the two series. The expansion is primarily focused on game development, including technical roles, but will also include support functions such as finance, human resources, and other administrative positions.

In June 2026, CD Projekt Red Boston relocated its office from Waltham to a larger facility in Watertown, Massachusetts, which includes motion-capture capabilities to support in‑house animation and performance capture. At the end of June 2026, CD Projekt Red Boston hub (Boston and Vancouver studios) employed 275 people, 242 of whom were developers.

== Games developed ==
Year	Title	Platform(s)	Note	Ref.
TBA	Cyberpunk 2	TBA	Co-developed by CD Projekt Vancouver and Warsaw. The game is in the pre-production phase.	
TBA	Project Sirius (untitled The Witcher game)	TBA	The game is in the pre-production phase.	
