= The Flame in the Flood =

2016 video game

- Developer: The Molasses Flood
- Publisher: Curve Digital (Note: Published by CD Projekt after 2021)
- Composer: Chuck Ragan
- Engine: Unreal Engine 4
- Platforms: Windows, macOS, Xbox One, PlayStation 4, Switch
- Release: Windows, macOS, Xbox One; February 24, 2016; PS4; January 17, 2017; Switch; October 12, 2017
- Genres: Roguelike, survival, adventure
- Mode: Single-player

The Flame in the Flood is a 2016 roguelike survival adventure video game developed by The Molasses Flood and published by Curve Digital. The game was developed for Microsoft Windows, macOS, and Xbox One. A PlayStation 4 version was released on January 17, 2017. A Nintendo Switch version was released on October 12, 2017. Publishing rights were moved to CD Projekt after its acquisition of The Molasses Flood.

== Gameplay ==
The player character is a young girl referred to as Scout. Her companion is a dog (named either Aesop or Daisy) who can sense danger and locate supplies. Scout uses a raft to traverse a large river, the result of an apocalyptic flood which has turned the land into a series of islands. The player must pay attention to Scout's needs such as her energy, thirst, hunger, warmth, and fatigue. Not paying attention to them can result in death. Like other roguelikes, death is permanent, although the player can restart at predetermined checkpoints along the river if they are playing in Campaign mode. There is a crafting system allowing the player to create new items. Players will need to scavenge areas for valuable items. Factors such as the weather impact the gameplay. Players are able to create insulated clothing to protect Scout from the cold. One of the developers referred to it as a "travelling survival game".

== Plot ==
The player must try to survive a river journey through the backwaters of a forgotten post-societal America.

== Development ==
The game was developed by a team of people who previously worked on BioShock, Halo 2, and Rock Band. It had a successful crowdfunding campaign, reaching $251,647 of a $150,000 goal. The game was originally available in beta, to its Kickstarter backers, and was released on Steam as an early access game on September 24, 2015.

=== Soundtrack ===
The soundtrack for the game was made by Chuck Ragan of the band Hot Water Music.

== Reception ==
Reception

Aggregate score
Aggregator	Score	
Aggregator	PC	Xbox One
Metacritic	73/100	74/100

Review scores
Publication	Score	
Publication	PC	Xbox One
Destructoid	7.5/10	N/A
Electronic Gaming Monthly	N/A	4/10
Game Informer	N/A	9/10
GameRevolution	2.5/5	N/A
GameSpot	8/10	N/A
IGN	7.3/10	N/A
PC Gamer (US)	70/100	N/A
VideoGamer.com	N/A	8/10
Hardcore Gamer	4/5	N/A

The Flame in the Flood received "mixed or average" reviews, on Metacritic, with the PC version scoring 73% based on 43 reviews, and the Xbox One version scoring 74% based on 22 reviews.

Ben Davis from Destructoid rated the game a 7.5/10 saying, "Even with its flaws, The Flame in the Flood remains an engaging and challenging survival game."

Mark Steighner of Hardcore Gamer gave the game a 4 out of 5 saying, "The Flame in the Flood offers a genuinely new variation on the survival game theme, tuned, focused and confident in its execution."

IGN awarded it a score of 7.3 out of 10, saying "Brutal and beautiful, The Flame in the Flood is a unique sort of survival game, with a few crucial flaws."

GameSpot awarded it a score of 8.0 out of 10, saying "Despite the awkward menu system, it's an absorbing game that lets you experience a journey in the present, and fully appreciate the sights, sounds, and joys of floating down the river in its alluring world."
