= CD Projekt Red =

Polish video game company

CD Projekt Red S.A.
- Logo used since 2026
- Type: Public
- Traded as: WSE: CDR; FWB: 7CD; WIG20 component (CDR)
- ISIN: PLOPTTC00011
- Industry: Video games
- Founded: May 1994; 32 years ago
- Founders: Marcin Iwiński; Michał Kiciński
- Headquarters: Warsaw, Poland
- Area served: Worldwide
- Key people: Marcin Iwiński (Chair); Adam Kiciński (Chair); Michał Nowakowski (President of the Management Board); Adam Badowski (President of the Management Board); Piotr Nielubowicz (Financial director)
- Products: The Witcher; Cyberpunk 2077
- Revenue: ▲1.23 billion zł (2023)
- Operating income: ▲469 million zł (2023)
- Net income: ▲481.1 million zł (2023)
- Total assets: ▲2.61 billion zł (2023)
- Total equity: ▲2.40 billion zł (2023)
- Owner: Marcin Iwiński (12.89%); Michał Kiciński (9.99%); Piotr Nielubowicz (6.87%); Adam Kiciński (4.05%)
- Number of employees: 1,134 (entire company) (Note: Total number of people employed by the entire company, including all subsidiaries, as of 3 September 2024.); 615 (CD Projekt Red only) (Note: Number includes only CD Projekt Red employees as of 31 December 2023.)
- Subsidiaries: See § Subsidiaries
- Website: cdprojekt.com

CD Projekt Red S.A. (Polish: [ˌt͡sɛˈdɛ ˈprɔjɛkt]) is a Polish video game company based in Warsaw, founded in May 1994 by Marcin Iwiński and Michał Kiciński. Iwiński and Kiciński were video game retailers before they founded the company, which initially acted as a distributor of foreign video games for the domestic market. The department responsible for developing original games, CD Projekt Red, best known for The Witcher series and Cyberpunk 2077, was formed in 2002. In 2008, CD Projekt launched the digital distribution service Good Old Games, now known as GOG.com; the platform was sold to CD Projekt co-founder Michał Kiciński in 2025.

The company began by translating major video game releases into Polish, collaborating with Interplay Entertainment for two Baldur's Gate games. CD Projekt was working on the PC version of Baldur's Gate: Dark Alliance when Interplay experienced financial difficulties. The game was cancelled and the company decided to reuse the code for its own video game. It became The Witcher, a 2007 video game based on the works of novelist Andrzej Sapkowski.

After the release of The Witcher, CD Projekt worked on a console port called The Witcher: White Wolf; however, development issues and increasing costs led the company to the brink of bankruptcy. CD Projekt later released The Witcher 2: Assassins of Kings in 2011 and The Witcher 3: Wild Hunt in 2015, with the latter winning various Game of the Year awards. In 2020, the company released Cyberpunk 2077, a role-playing game based on the Cyberpunk 2020 tabletop game system for which it opened a new division in Wrocław. A video game distribution service, GOG.com, was established by CD Projekt in 2008 to help players find old games. Its mission is to offer games free of digital rights management (DRM) to players and its service was expanded in 2012 to cover new AAA and independent games.

In 2009, CD Projekt's then-parent company, CDP Investment, announced its plans to merge with Optimus S.A. in a deal intended to reorganise CD Projekt as a publicly traded company. The merger was closed in December 2010 with Optimus as the legal surviving entity; Optimus became the current incarnation of CD Projekt S.A. in July 2011. By September 2017, it was the largest publicly traded video game company in Poland, worth about US$2.3 billion, and by May 2020, had reached a valuation of US$8.1 billion, making it the largest video game company in Europe. In March 2018, the company joined WIG20, an index of the 20 largest companies on the Warsaw Stock Exchange. The company is also listed on the Frankfurt Stock Exchange. On 23 June 2026, the website bankier.pl stated that the old company name CD Projekt S.A. was to be replaced by CD Projekt RED S.A. in order to "ensure consistency in the communication of the CD Projekt RED brand".

== History ==
=== Founding ===
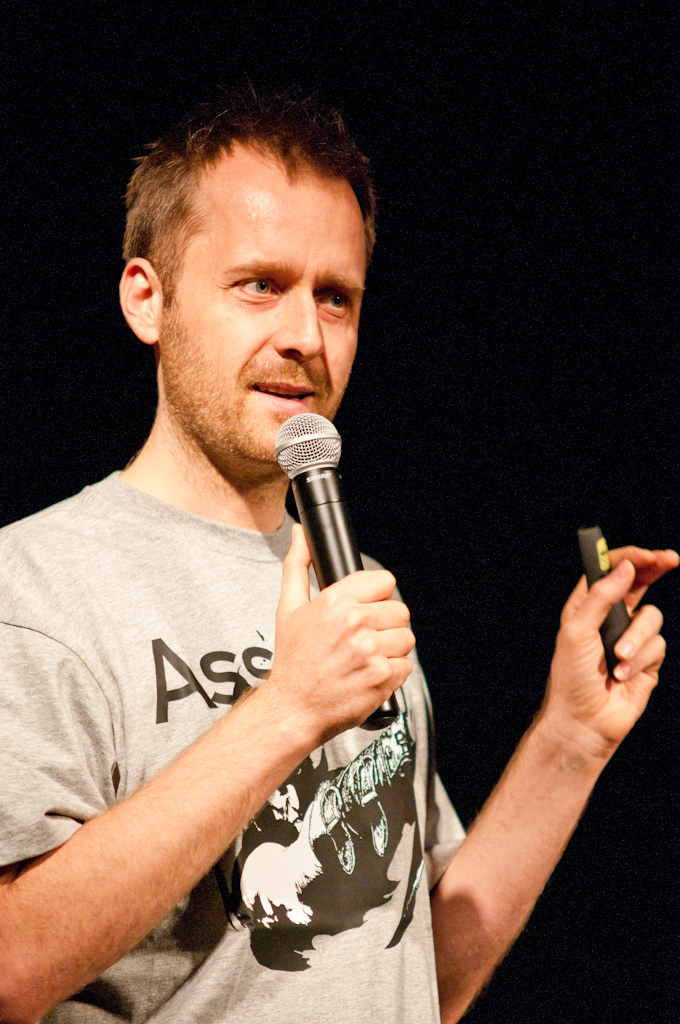
CD Projekt co-founder Marcin Iwiński in 2011

Former logo that was used until 2014

CD Projekt was founded in May 1994 by Marcin Iwiński and Michał Kiciński. According to Iwiński, although he enjoyed playing video games as a child they were scarce in the Polish People's Republic (which experienced political unrest, martial law, and goods shortages during the 1980s). Marcin Iwiński, in high school, was selling cracked copies of Western video games at a Warsaw marketplace (stalls on the streets with many such products were popular in the newly established and aggressively privatised Third Polish Republic of the 1990s). In high school, Iwiński met Kiciński, who became his business partner; at that time, Kiciński was also selling video games.

Wanting to conduct business legitimately, Iwiński and Kiciński began importing games from US retailers and were the first importers of CD-ROM games. After Poland's transition to a primarily market-based economy in the early 90s, they founded their own company. Iwiński and Kiciński founded CD Projekt in the second quarter of 1994. With only $2,000, they used a friend's flat as a rent-free office.

=== Localization ===
The company was one of the first in Poland to localize games; according to Iwiński, most of their products were sold to "mom-and-pop shops". CD Projekt began partial localization for developers such as Seven Stars and Leryx-LongSoft in 1996, and full-scale localization a year later. According to Iwiński, one of their first successful localization titles was for Ace Ventura; whereas previous localizations had only sold copies in the hundreds, Ace Ventura sold in the thousands, establishing the success of its localization approach. With its methods affirmed, CD Projekt approached BioWare and Interplay Entertainment for the Polish localization of Baldur's Gate. They expected the title to become popular in Poland, and felt that no retailer would be able to translate the text from English to Polish. To increase the title's popularity in Poland, CD Projekt added items to the game's packaging and hired well-known Polish actors to voice its characters. Their first attempt was successful, with 18,000 units shipped on the game's release day (higher than the average shipments of other games at the time).

The company continued to work with Interplay after the release of Baldur's Gate, collaborating on a PC port for the sequel Baldur's Gate: Dark Alliance. To develop the port, CD Projekt hired Sebastian Zieliński (who had developed Mortyr 2093-1944) and Adam Badowski. Six months after development began, Interplay experienced financial problems and cancelled the PC version. CD Projekt continued to localize other games after Dark Alliance's cancellation. Especially the localization of Gothic (released in Poland in 2002) and Gothic II (in 2003), for which CD Projekt was also the publisher in Poland, was a success for the company. The main series of Gothic became very popular in Poland and – according to developers of CD Projekt itself – a primary influence in the later development of The Witcher game series. CD Projekt received Business Gazelle awards in 2003 and 2004.

=== CD Projekt Red ===
Logo used from May 2014 until August 2026

Enthusiasm for game distribution ebbed, and CD Projekt's founders wondered if the company should continue as a distributor or a game developer after Dark Alliance's cancellation. With the game cancelled and its code owned by CD Projekt, the company planned to use them to develop their first original game. They intended to develop a game series based on Andrzej Sapkowski's Wiedźmin books (which were popular in Poland) and the author accepted the company's development proposal. The franchise rights had been sold to Metropolis Software in 1997 and a playable version of the first chapter was made, but then left abandoned. CD Projekt acquired the rights to the Wiedźmin franchise in 2002. According to Iwiński, he and Kiciński had no idea how to develop a video game at that time.

CD Projekt Red created a demo in a year. "It was a piece of crap," chuckles Adam Badowski. "We tried to convince Marcin and Michal not to go on the first business trip with the demo, but they decided..." to show it to a dozen publishers all around Europe on the most expensive and powerful laptop money could buy, Iwiński fills in. "After two weeks of meetings, we get two emails saying, in a very nice British way, 'It's not so good'. So pretty much: 'Boys, go home'. We were shattered. We were like, 'Oh my god we suck'".

— CD Projekt co-founder Marcin Iwiński, on publisher rejection of the Witcher demo

To develop the game, the company formed a video game development studio, CD Projekt Red sp. z o.o. (stylised as CD PROJEKT RED), which was headed by Sebastian Zieliński in Łódź in 2002. The studio made a demonstration game, which Adam Badowski called "a piece of crap" in retrospect. The demo was a role-playing game with a top-down perspective, similar to Dark Alliance and Diablo, and used the game engine which powered Mortyr. Iwiński and Kiciński pitched the demo to a number of publishers, without success. The Łódź office closed and the staff, except for Zieliński, moved to the Warsaw headquarters.

Zieliński left the company, and Kiciński headed the project. Although the game's development continued, the demo was abandoned. According to CD Projekt, the development team had different ideas for the game and lacked overall direction; as a result, it was returned to the drawing board in 2003. The team, unfamiliar with video-game development, spent nearly two years organising production. They received assistance from BioWare, who helped promote the game at the 2004 Electronic Entertainment Expo by offering CD Projekt space in their booth next to Jade Empire. BioWare also licensed their Aurora game engine to the company.

The game's budget exceeded expectations. The original 15-person development team expanded to about 100, at a cost of 20 million złoty. According to Iwiński, content was removed from the game for budgetary reasons but the characters' personalities were retained; however, there was difficulty in translating the game's Polish text into English. Atari agreed to publish the game. After five years of development, the game brought Wiedźmin to an international audience, and so the company adopted the English name, The Witcher, coined by Adrian Chmielarz. (Note: Chmielarz's claim to the term "Witcher" is disputed by Sapkowski in the latter's 2005 book-interview (see The Witcher § The name "Witcher")) The Witcher was released in 2007 to generally positive reviews.

Sales were satisfactory, and the development of sequels began almost immediately after The Witcher's release. The team began the design work for The Witcher 2: Assassins of Kings, and experimented with consoles to develop a new engine for The Witcher 3. Their development was halted when the team began work on The Witcher: White Wolf, a console version of The Witcher. Although they collaborated with French studio Widescreen Games for the console port, it entered development limbo. Widescreen demanded more manpower, money and time to develop the title, complaining that they were not being paid; according to Iwiński, CD Projekt paid them more than their own staff members. The team cancelled the project, suspending its development. Unhappy with the decision, Atari demanded that CD Projekt repay it for funding the console port development and Iwiński agreed that Atari would be the North American publisher of the sequel of The Witcher 2. CD Projekt acquired Metropolis Software in 2008.

The dispute over White Wolf was costly; the company faced bankruptcy, with the 2008 financial crisis as a contributing factor. To stay afloat, the team decided to focus on The Witcher 2 with the Witcher 3 engine. When the engine (known as Red Engine) was finished, the game could be ported to other consoles. To develop The Witcher 2, the company suspended development of Metropolis' first-person shooter, titled They. After three-and-a-half years of development, The Witcher 2: Assassins of Kings was released in 2011 to critical praise and sales of more than 1.7 million copies.

After The Witcher 2, CD Projekt wanted to develop an open-world game of a quality similar to its other games, and the company wanted to add features to avoid criticism that it was Witcher 2.5. They wanted to push the game's graphics boundaries, releasing it only for the PC and eighth-generation consoles. This triggered debate on the team, some of whom wanted to release the game for older consoles to maximise profit. The Witcher 3: Wild Hunt took three-and-a-half years to develop and cost over $81 million. A report alleged that the team had to crunch extensively for a year in order to meet release date deadlines. After multiple delays, it was released in May 2015 to critical praise. Wild Hunt was commercially successful, selling six million copies in its first six weeks and giving the studio a profit of 236 million złoty ($62.5 million) in the first half of 2015. The team released 16 free content downloads and two paid expansions, Hearts of Stone and Blood and Wine. The team decided that The Witcher 3: Wild Hunt would be the final game in the series with Geralt. Regarding the future of the Witcher series, Konrad Tomaszkiewicz, game director of The Witcher 3, stated in May 2016 that he hoped to continue working with the series sometime in the future, but had nothing planned at the time.

The success of The Witcher 3 enabled CD Projekt to expand. In March 2016, the company announced that it had another role-playing game in development, and that the title is scheduled to be released in the period of 2017 to 2021. They also announced plans for expansion, where the Red division will expand two-fold. It also listed itself at Warsaw Stock Exchange, riding on the success of The Witcher 3. As of 2017, The Witcher series had sold over 33 million copies. A spin-off of the series, Gwent: The Witcher Card Game, based on the popular card game in The Witcher 3, was released in 2018.

In March 2018, the opening of a new studio in Wrocław was announced. Acquired from a studio called Strange New Things, it is headed by former Techland COO Paweł Zawodny and composed of other ex-Techland, IO Interactive, and CD Projekt Red employees. In August 2018, CD Projekt established Spokko, a development studio focused on mobile gaming. The Witcher 3's success as well as CD Projekt RED's customer-friendly policies during that period enabled the studio to earn a lot of goodwill within the gaming community. However, the studio's working conditions were questioned after disgruntled employees flooded the company's profile at Glassdoor with negative reviews. Iwinski later responded by saying that the studio's approach to making games "is not for everyone".

Following the successful release of The Witcher 3: Wild Hunt, Cyberpunk 2077, the studio's next title, became one of the most anticipated video games of all time. It is an open-world role-playing game based on the Cyberpunk 2020 tabletop system created by Mike Pondsmith. The game was initially introduced in May 2012. The hype for the title, alongside the release of The Witcher TV series on Netflix, enabled CD Projekt to become the most valuable video game company in Europe in May 2020, surpassing Ubisoft. The game suffered multiple delays, with the team stressing that it would not release the game until it was ready. While CD Projekt Red initially introduced a "non-obligatory crunch" model for the team to lessen the effects of game development on their personal lives, a mandatory crunch period was eventually implemented, requiring all developers to work six-day weeks. The game was released in December 2020. The PC version received generally positive reviews and became one of the biggest video game launches for PC. The development cost was fully recouped based on pre-order sales alone. However, the console versions were plagued with technical issues and software bugs, with some players reporting that these versions were unplayable. The studio was accused of hiding the poor state of the console versions from its customers during the game's marketing. On 18 December 2020 the game was removed from the PlayStation online store. Kiciński acknowledged that the company's approach to marketing the console versions eroded players' trust in the studio, and promised to release patches for the game.

In early February 2021, CD Projekt Red was hit by a ransomware attack, with the attackers able to acquire the source code to several of the studio's games, including Gwent, The Witcher 3 and Cyberpunk 2077 as well as administrative files. The attackers demanded CD Projekt Red pay them a large sum of money within a few days under threat of leaking or selling the stolen code and files. CD Projekt refused to negotiate with the attackers, stating to the press that "We will not give in to the demands or negotiate with the actor", affirming no personal information was obtained in the attack and that it was working with law enforcement to track down the attackers. Security analysts saw the code being auctioned on the dark web for a minimum price of US$1 million, and subsequently closed later with the attackers stating they had received an offer that satisfied them. Within a week of these auctions, the code was being shared online via social media, and CD Projekt began using DMCA takedown notices to remove postings of its code.

In March 2021, CD Projekt Red acquired Vancouver, Canada-based Digital Scapes Studios and rebranded the studio as CD Projekt Red Vancouver. In May, it was reported that Tomaszkiewicz had resigned from studio following an internal investigation into workplace bullying allegations that found him not guilty. He founded his own studio and began developing The Blood of Dawnwalker. In October 2021, CD Projekt Red acquired Boston-based independent studio The Molasses Flood, the developer of The Flame in the Flood. On 6 October 2022, CD Projekt announced a slew of new projects that were in the works. These included a sequel to Cyberpunk 2077, codenamed Orion, and several new titles in The Witcher series. These included a new trilogy of games, the first of which is codenamed Polaris; a standalone game known as Canis Majoris (later confirmed to be a remake of the first Witcher game); and a single-player/multiplayer hybrid game from The Molasses Flood.

In December 2022, it was announced that active development on Gwent would end after 2023. Instead of shutting down completely, the game would be controlled by the community, allowing players to determine matters like balance decisions. Thirty members of the Gwent development team were laid off in June 2023. The game's final update was released in October 2023. On 20 March 2023, CD Projekt announced its intentions to write off funds allocated to the development of Project Sirius, and that work would need to be restarted from scratch. That May, 29 employees of The Molasses Flood were laid off once changes were made to Project Sirius. In July 2023, CD Projekt CEO Adam Kiciński announced that it would be laying off around 100 workers—9% of its total workforce—from CD Projekt RED.

=== REDengine ===
REDengine is a game engine developed by CD Projekt Red exclusively for its nonlinear role-playing video games. It is the replacement of the Aurora Engine CD Projekt Red had previously licensed from BioWare for the development of The Witcher. REDengine is portable across 32- and 64-bit software platforms and runs under Windows. REDengine was first used in The Witcher 2: Assassins of Kings for Windows. REDengine 2, an updated version of REDengine used in The Witcher 2, also runs under Xbox 360 and both OS X and Linux, however these ports were made using a compatibility layer similar to Wine called eON. REDengine 3 was designed exclusively for a 64-bit software platform, and also runs under PlayStation 4, Xbox One, and Nintendo Switch. REDengine 2 utilized middleware such as Havok for physics, Scaleform GFx for the user interface, and FMOD for audio. The engine was used for the Xbox 360 port of The Witcher 2.

REDengine 3 was designed to run exclusively on a 64-bit software platform. CD Projekt Red created REDengine 3 for the purpose of developing open world video game environments, such as those of The Witcher 3: Wild Hunt. It introduces improvements to facial and other animations. Lighting effects no longer suffer from reduced contrast ratio. REDengine 3 also supports volumetric effects enabling advanced rendering of clouds, mist, fog, smoke, and other particle effects. There is also support for high-resolution textures and mapping, as well as dynamic physics and an advanced dialogue lip-syncing system. However, due to limitations on texture streaming, the use of high-resolution textures may not always be the case.

REDengine 3 has a flexible renderer prepared for deferred or forward+ rendering pipelines. The result is a wide array of cinematic effects, including depth-of-view, color grading and lens flares associated with multiple lighting. The terrain system in REDengine 3 uses tessellation and layers varying material, which can then be easily blended. Cyberpunk 2077 used REDengine 4, which supported ray-traced global illumination and other effects. On 21 March 2022, CD Projekt announced a partnership with Epic Games after retiring REDengine to use Unreal Engine 5. In April 2022, Studio CTO Paweł Zawodny said that the decision to change engines came down to Unreal Engine 5's new focus on open world game design. Shifting to Unreal Engine 5 also enabled CD Projekt to leave much of the engine-level development to Epic Games, allowing the studio to focus primarily on creating its game.

=== Game distribution ===

In 2008, the company introduced Good Old Games, a distribution service with a digital rights management-free strategy. GOG.com aims to help players find "good old games", preserving old games. To do so, the team needed to unravel licensing issues for defunct developers or negotiate with publishers for distribution rights. To recover old code for conversion to modern platforms, they had to use retail versions or second-hand games. CD Projekt partnered with small developers and large publishers, including Activision, Electronic Arts and Ubisoft, to broaden the service's portfolio of games to triple-A and independent video games.

Despite suspicions that it was a "doomed project", according to managing director Guillaume Rambourg, it has expanded since its introduction. As of June 2015, GOG.com sold 690,000 units of CD Projekt Red's game The Witcher 3: Wild Hunt redeemed through the service, more than the second largest digital seller Steam (approx. 580,000 units) and all other PC digital distribution services combined. As of 8 July 2019, a third of Cyberpunk 2077 digital pre-orders were sold on GOG.com. Income from GOG.com (known internally as CD Projekt Blue) accrues to CD Projekt Red. GOG.com was sold by CD Projekt to Michał Kiciński, one of the original founders of GOG, in December 2025. The sale allows GOG to remain independent of CD Projekt, though the studio will continue to support GOG for its games. With its independence, GOG intends to focus more on preservation of video games while maintaining its ongoing support for DRM-free games.

== Subsidiaries ==
Name	Location	Parent	Founded	Acquired	Notes
CD Projekt Red	Warsaw	CD Projekt Red Europe	2002		Known for The Witcher series and Cyberpunk 2077
CD Projekt Red Wrocław	Wrocław	CD Projekt Red Europe	2018		
CD Projekt Red Kraków	Kraków	CD Projekt Red Europe	2013		
CD Projekt Red Vancouver	Vancouver	CD Projekt Red North America	2012	2021	Formerly Digital Scapes Studios
CD Projekt Red Boston	Boston	CD Projekt Red North America	2023		Formed to drive development of Cyberpunk 2

=== Former subsidiaries ===
Name	Location	Founded	Acquired	Closed/Divested	Notes
Metropolis Software	Warsaw	1992	2008	2009	Closed
GOG Sp. z o.o.	Warsaw	2008		2025	Sold to Michał Kiciński, one of the founders of CD Projekt and GOG
CDP.pl	Warsaw	1994		2014	Sold to the management, filed for bankruptcy in 2020
Spokko	Warsaw	2018		2022	Merged into CD Projekt Red
The Molasses Flood	Boston	2014	2021	2025	Merged into CD Projekt Red Boston

== Games developed ==
Year	Title	Platform(s)	Developer(s)	Notes
2007	The Witcher	Windows, macOS	CD Projekt Red	Enhanced Edition released in 2008
2011	The Witcher 2: Assassins of Kings	Windows, Linux, macOS, Xbox 360	CD Projekt Red	Enhanced Edition released in 2012
2014	The Witcher Adventure Game	Android, iOS, macOS, Windows	CD Projekt Red, Can Explode	—N/a
2015	The Witcher Battle Arena	Android, iOS	CD Projekt Red, Fuero Games	—N/a
2015	The Witcher 3: Wild Hunt	PlayStation 4, Windows, Xbox One, Nintendo Switch, PlayStation 5, Xbox Series X/S	CD Projekt Red	—N/a
2015	The Witcher 3: Wild Hunt – Hearts of Stone	PlayStation 4, Windows, Xbox One, Nintendo Switch, PlayStation 5, Xbox Series X/S	CD Projekt Red	Expansion pack to The Witcher 3: Wild Hunt
2016	The Witcher 3: Wild Hunt – Blood and Wine	PlayStation 4, Windows, Xbox One, Nintendo Switch, PlayStation 5, Xbox Series X/S	CD Projekt Red	Expansion pack to The Witcher 3: Wild Hunt
2018	Gwent: The Witcher Card Game	PlayStation 4, Windows, Xbox One, iOS, Android	CD Projekt Red	Spin-off of a card game featured in The Witcher 3
2018	Thronebreaker: The Witcher Tales	Windows, PlayStation 4, Xbox One, Nintendo Switch, iOS, Android	CD Projekt Red	Standalone single-player game originally planned to be included in Gwent as Gwent: Thronebreaker
2020	Cyberpunk 2077	PlayStation 4, Stadia, Windows, Xbox One, PlayStation 5, Xbox Series X/S, macOS, Nintendo Switch 2	CD Projekt Red	—N/a
2021	The Witcher: Monster Slayer	Android, iOS	Spokko	—N/a
2022	Gwent: Rogue Mage	Windows, Android, iOS	CD Projekt Red	Standalone single-player expansion to Gwent
2022	Roach Race	Android, iOS	CD Projekt Red, Crunching Koalas	Also released as an arcade minigame in Cyberpunk 2077 via DLC
2023	Cyberpunk 2077: Phantom Liberty	PlayStation 5, Windows, Xbox Series X/S, Nintendo Switch 2, macOS	CD Projekt Red	Expansion pack to Cyberpunk 2077
2026	The Witcher 3: Wild Hunt Remastered	PlayStation 5, Windows, Xbox Series X/S, Nintendo Switch 2, macOS	CD Projekt Red	Remastered version of The Witcher 3: Wild Hunt
2027	The Witcher 3: Wild Hunt – Songs of the Past	PlayStation 5, Windows, Xbox Series X/S, Nintendo Switch 2, macOS	CD Projekt Red, Fool's Theory	Expansion pack to The Witcher 3: Wild Hunt
2028	The Witcher IV	PlayStation 5, Windows, Xbox Series X/S	CD Projekt Red	First game in a new trilogy set in The Witcher universe. The game is in the Full-production phase.
TBA	The Witcher Remake	TBA	Fool's Theory	Remake of The Witcher (2007), developed using Unreal Engine 5. The game is in the early planning phase.
TBA	Project Hadar	TBA	CD Projekt Red	CD Projekt's first original IP. The game is in the IP planning phase.
TBA	Cyberpunk 2	TBA	CD Projekt Red North America	Sequel to Cyberpunk 2077. The game is in the pre-production phase.
TBA	Project Sirius	TBA	CD Projekt Red North America	New game set in The Witcher universe featuring multiplayer. The game is in the pre-production phase.
TBA	Untitled game	TBA	Scopely, CD Projekt Red	New game based on a CD Projekt IP. The game is in the early planning phase.

== Business views ==
The moment we start becoming conservative [and] stop taking creative risks and business risks, and stop being true to what we're doing, that's when we should worry. And I am not worried. Our values and our care for what we are doing and – hopefully what gamers would agree with – care for gamers is what drives this company forward. It's my personal horror to become a faceless behemoth of game development or publishing or whatnot. As long as I am here I will be fighting for this not to happen.

— CD Projekt Red founder Marcin Iwiński, on maintaining independence

The company claims to focus on certain aspects and features of a game at a time, in order to ensure quality. The company focuses on the development of role-playing games, with the team working on established franchises with a fan base and introducing lesser-known franchises to a wide audience. The studio has been praised for prioritising quest design over the size of the game world in its open-world games.

CD Projekt Red opposes the inclusion of digital-rights-management technology in video games and software. The company believes that DRM is ineffective in halting software piracy, based on data from sales of The Witcher 2: Assassins of Kings. CD Projekt Red found that its initial release (which included DRM technology) was pirated over 4.5 million times; its DRM-free re-release was pirated far less. The Witcher 3: Wild Hunt and Cyberpunk 2077 were released without DRM technology. The team believes that free downloadable content should be an industry standard. The company demonstrated this by releasing several free DLC for Wild Hunt.

According to Studio Head Adam Badowski, CD Projekt Red avoided becoming a subsidiary of another company in order to preserve its financial and creative freedom and ownership of its projects. In 2015, Electronic Arts was rumoured to be attempting to acquire CD Projekt, but this was denied by Iwiński who said that maintaining the company's independence was something he would be fighting for. Financial details on development, marketing and release costs are freely published, citing being "open in communication" as one of the company's core values.

The company used to follow Rockstar Games' business model, where the company works on a single project with a large team and avoids working on multiple projects at the same time. In March 2021, it changed its strategy. From 2022 onward, it will work on multiple AAA games in parallel.

== Controversy ==
In December 2021, CD Projekt agreed to pay $1.85 million while negotiating to settle a class-action lawsuit over the problematic release of Cyberpunk 2077, a game which at launch had several technical issues that many users experienced.
