= The Witcher 2: Assassins of Kings =

2011 video game

- Developer: CD Projekt Red
- Publisher: CD Projekt
- Director: Adam Badowski
- Producer: Jędrzej Mróz
- Designers: Mateusz Kanik; Maciej Szcześnik
- Programmer: Tomasz Wójcik
- Writers: Sebastian Stępień; Konrad Tomaszkiewicz; Marcin Blacha
- Composers: Adam Skorupa; Krzysztof Wierzynkiewicz; Marcin Przybyłowicz
- Series: The Witcher
- Engine: REDengine
- Platforms: Windows; Xbox 360; OS X; Linux
- Release: 17 May 2011: WW: 17 May 2011; Enhanced Edition; Windows, Xbox 360; WW: 17 April 2012; OS X; WW: 18 October 2012; Linux; WW: 22 May 2014
- Genre: Action role-playing
- Mode: Single-player

The Witcher 2: Assassins of Kings (Note: Polish: Wiedźmin 2: Zabójcy królów) is a 2011 action role-playing game developed by CD Projekt Red, based on The Witcher series of fantasy novels authored by Andrzej Sapkowski. It is a sequel to the 2007 game, The Witcher and the second main installment in The Witcher's video game series. It was released for Windows, Xbox 360, OS X, and Linux.

The player directs the actions of Geralt of Rivia, a monster hunter known as a Witcher. The fantasy world in which his adventures take place owes much to Polish history and Slavic mythology. The game was both a critical and commercial success, selling over eight million copies by September 2014. The third installment in the series, The Witcher 3: Wild Hunt, was released in 2015. A fourth installment, The Witcher IV, is planned for release in 2028.

== Gameplay ==
Screenshot of Geralt in the opening part of the game

The gameplay of The Witcher 2 is a marked departure from that of its predecessor. Combat, for instance, is more complex, with additions in the form of abilities to lay traps and aim and throw ranged weapons. The protagonist, Geralt, has an improved offensive and defensive arsenal, with a range of melee and ranged weapons, armor, bombs, traps, and secondary weapons such as hatchets and shovels. Upgrades are divided into four paths: an initial training path, which includes generalized upgrades for core abilities and must be invested in before the other paths can be accessed; swordsmanship, which improves Geralt's sword-fighting abilities; alchemy, which includes perks such as reducing the negative effects of potions; and magic, which improves Witcher Signs.

The Witcher 2 includes a stealth mode in certain parts of the game, where players must remain undetected as they make their way to a certain objective. Players have the option of stunning enemies if Geralt manages to get behind them, but the player may choose to take a less subtle approach and engage the guards in combat.

== Plot ==
=== Story ===
The player controls Geralt of Rivia, who is one of the few remaining witchers – enhanced and trained humans with special powers who hunt monsters for a living. The Witcher 2: Assassins of Kings contains different paths and storylines, along with multiple endings.

==== Prologue ====
At the start of the game, Geralt is in prison under suspicion of assassinating Foltest, the king of Temeria. The head of the Temerian special forces, Vernon Roche, interrogates Geralt and learns the story that led from Geralt being Foltest's right-hand man to a prisoner. Prior to and during the events of The Witcher, Foltest had a secret relationship with a baroness named Maria Louisa La Valette, which led to two children, Anais and Boussy. Some time after Geralt saved Foltest from a witcher assassin, (Note: As depicted in The Witcher) Foltest attempted to claim his children and bring them to live with him in Vizima. Maria was not willing to give up the children, and Foltest waged a war to claim them. Geralt succeeded in escorting Foltest to his children, but an unknown assailant kills Foltest before disappearing, leaving Geralt the only suspect. After the interrogation, Roche decides that Geralt is innocent and aids him in escaping the prison. The two, along with sorceress Triss Merigold, go in search of the kingslayer.

==== Chapter 1 ====
The trio arrives in the trading town of Flotsam and is ambushed by Iorveth, a rebel elf. It appears to the group that a witcher, believed to have assassinated King Demavend of the neighboring country of Aedirn, is in league with the rebels. Geralt saves his old friends, the bard Dandelion and the dwarf Zoltan Chivay, from being hanged in the city square. With the help of sorceress Síle de Tansarville, Geralt kills a kayran, a giant monster that is disrupting the town's trade routes. Geralt discovers that Loredo, the ostensibly Temerian commander of the town, is intending to sell the town to King Henselt of Kaedwen. He also discovers that the kingslayer, a witcher known as Letho, means to betray Iorveth and convinces the elf of the truth. As Geralt and Iorveth confront Letho, Roche arrives with an armed force. The player chooses between assisting Iorveth or Roche, thus setting the path of the second chapter. Regardless of the choice, Letho kidnaps Triss and forces her to teleport both of them to Aedirn.

==== Chapter 2 (Iorveth) ====
If Geralt assists Iorveth, the pair sail to upper Aedirn. There, they become embroiled in a rebellion against King Henselt of neighboring Kaedwen, and they assist the rebel forces. Geralt completes three missions: formulating a poison antidote for rebel leader Saskia, determining Triss's whereabouts (captured by spies from the empire of Nilfgaard and taken to Loc Muinne), and lifting a battlefield curse that is preventing the rebels from defending Vergen, the rebels' base of operations. The rebels defeat King Henselt's army, and Henselt is forced to acknowledge Saskia's terms. Geralt discovers Saskia is a dragon taking human form, but she is under mind control by her advisor, the sorceress Philippa Eilhart. When Philippa teleports Saskia and herself to Loc Muinne, Geralt and Iorveth follow.

==== Chapter 2 (Roche) ====
If Geralt assists Roche, Roche has Geralt assassinate Loredo for treason. Geralt and Roche sail to upper Aedirn. There, they also become embroiled in the rebellion against King Henselt, but assist the king instead of fighting against him. Geralt discovers an insurgency in the Kaedweni army: loyalists who are convinced Henselt is conspiring with the empire of Nilfgaard. Geralt completes three missions: determining Triss's whereabouts (captured by a diplomatic delegation from Nilfgaard and taken to Loc Muinne), lifting a curse on King Henselt, and lifting a battlefield curse that is preventing the king from marching on the city of Vergen. Geralt defends Henselt from two witcher assassins, and assists Dethmold, a mage and royal advisor to King Henselt, in a necromancy ritual to discover they are in league with Síle de Tansarville, who has already fled to Loc Muinne with fellow sorceress Philippa Eilhart and entranced rebel leader Saskia in tow. Roche is revealed to be plotting against Kaedwen, and Henselt executes most of Roche's men in retaliation. As Henselt assaults Vergen, Geralt defeats Henselt's personal guard, and either allows Roche to murder Henselt in revenge (which causes a civil war in Kaedwen) or convinces him to spare the king. Geralt and Roche then go to Loc Muinne, on the trail of Triss and Philippa.

==== Chapter 3 ====
Geralt arrives at Loc Muinne with either Iorveth or Roche, depending on whom he assisted previously. The mages have called a meeting to establish a new magical ruling body known as the Conclave, and all royal leaders are at Loc Muinne. Philippa Eilhart and Síle de Tansarville intend to use the meeting to establish their own power, with the still-entranced Saskia as leverage.

If Geralt arrives with Iorveth, he must choose between rescuing Triss or rescuing Philippa, who is the only person capable of lifting the spell from Saskia but who was captured and blinded by the king of Redania. If Geralt arrives with Roche, he must choose between rescuing Triss or rescuing the kidnapped Princess Anais of Temeria. Depending on the choice, the mage-royal meeting is interrupted when Nilfgaardian forces arrive with Letho, who reveals the sorceresses' entire plot, or if Triss is rescued – regardless of whom Geralt assisted – she reveals the sorceresses' plot instead. The meeting is interrupted again by Saskia in dragon form, who is still under mind control by Philippa. Geralt chases down Síle, who attempts to use her megascope (a magical teleporter) to escape. However, Letho had sabotaged the megascope, in which Síle becomes stuck. Geralt can either rescue Síle or do nothing, in which case Síle is torn to bits. Finally, Geralt duels Saskia, after which he can kill her, let her live, or (if he rescued Philippa earlier) break the spell over Saskia's mind.

==== Epilogue ====
If Triss was rescued, the Conclave is restored and the mages work to seal Loc Muinne. If Triss was not rescued, a bloody pogrom of magic users occurs in Loc Muinne and throughout the Northern Kingdoms. Geralt finally confronts Letho, who reveals a Nilfgaardian plot to destabilize the Northern Kingdoms. After hearing Letho's story, Geralt can either let him go or duel him to the death. Geralt then reunites with Triss and either Iorveth or Roche, and sets off south. A concurrent plot of the game is Geralt's attempts to recover lost memories from his previous life, learning more about his beloved Yennefer, and the mythical Wild Hunt. The post-credit scene reveals a wood gathering peasant witnessing a Nilfgaardian invasion, setting the stage for The Witcher 3: Wild Hunt.

== Development ==
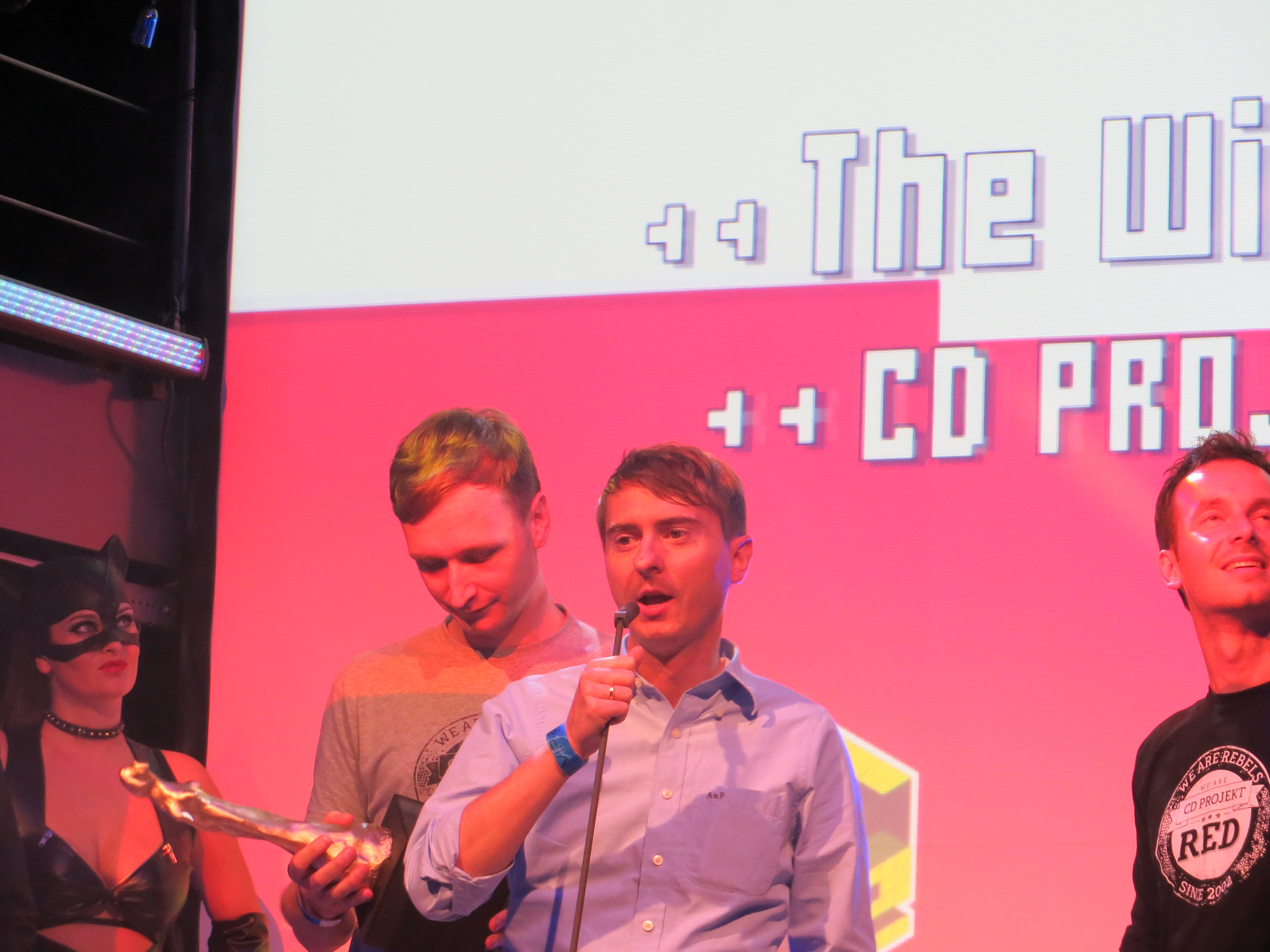
CD Projekt Red receiving the European Games Award for The Witcher 2 at Gamescom 2012

The Witcher 2: Assassins of Kings was announced on 18 September 2009. CD Projekt Red developed a proprietary engine, the REDengine, for the game, unlike the first installment, which ran on a modified version of BioWare's Aurora Engine. The game incorporates the Havok physics engine.

The Witcher 2 features a branching dialogue system with full voice acting, which was cast, directed, and recorded in London, England. The developers said that the game would have 16 different endings, although that was later clarified as 16 "states of the world" by the game's end. The game drew from influences such as Demon's Souls, Heavy Rain, and Batman: Arkham Asylum.

CD Projekt Red released the first gameplay video on 25 March 2011, showcasing different methods with which a player could complete a level. Another gameplay video was revealed at Gamescom 2011, displaying the game's characters and settings. An Xbox 360 version was announced on 2 June 2011, with CD Projekt Red confirming that it would be released by the end of the year. On 1 August 2011, the Xbox 360 release date was pushed back to the first quarter of 2012 to give the team "more time expanding and polishing certain elements of the gameplay" and to allow the developers time to deal with legal issues surrounding distribution rights for the game.

=== Release ===
During the game's initial announcement, CD Projekt Red revealed that their parent company CD Projekt would self-distribute the game in Poland, in addition to Central Europe. A contract with Agora S.A. was announced to allow the company to co-produce the game in Poland. Distribution deals with Atari in North America and 1C Company/Snowball Studios in Russia were already put into place, while a European distribution plan was still under negotiations. On 25 May 2010, it was announced that Namco Bandai Partners would distribute the game in Western Europe, Australia, New Zealand, and the Middle East.

On 14 April 2011, CD Projekt Red announced during their CDP Days 2011 Spring Conference that retail copies of the game would feature SecuRom digital rights management (DRM). The protection would still allow for infinite installations on an infinite number of PCs, with the ability to play on up to five PCs at any one time. It was confirmed that the game would feature no censorship between regions. The Witcher 2 was distributed through several digital distribution services such as Steam and CD Projekt Red's own service GOG.com. The version sold on GOG.com was the only version that did not have any DRM at release.

On 3 May 2011, Namco Bandai Partners Australia confirmed that the Australian release of the game would be modified to meet the MA15+ rating. The edit specifically relates to a side quest in which Geralt is offered sex as a reward for completing the quest. The Australian version sees Geralt decline the offer automatically. Three weeks prior to this announcement, the game was removed from the Australian Steam store, causing outrage amongst the Australian gaming community. Additionally, CD Projekt Red's digital distribution service GOG.com announced that the price of the Australian version would be increased due to licensing issues, but that customers could still pre-order the game for its original price 17 hours before the change.

The Witcher 2: Assassins of Kings was released for PC on 17 May 2011 at retail stores and digital distribution services such as GOG and Steam.

==== Xbox 360 version ====
On 30 June 2011, it was announced that THQ would be the distributor for the Xbox 360 version of the game for Western Europe, Australia, New Zealand, and the Middle East instead of Namco Bandai Partners. On 8 July 2011, Namco Bandai sued CD Projekt, accusing CD Projekt of breaking its contractual obligations with the publisher. On 8 December 2011, Namco Bandai won the suit, and CD Projekt Red's distribution agreement with THQ was canceled.

On 21 October 2011, Warner Bros. Interactive Entertainment signed as the North American distributor for the Xbox 360 version.

UK supermarket chain Tesco released the Xbox 360 version of the game on Friday 13 April 2012 – four days ahead of the scheduled release date – and were asked to pull the game off the shelves until the original release date.

Spike Chunsoft localised and published the Xbox 360 version in Japan.

=== Marketing ===
GOG promoted the game by reducing the price of The Witcher a week before the sequel's release. They encouraged players to import their save files from the first game to the second. Steam offered three promotional The Witcher 2 items for Team Fortress 2. These were a hat of hair, a sword, and a necklace, which were limited to the game's Scout class. The May 2011 issue of the Polish version of Playboy featured the half-naked character Triss on the cover. In Russia, publishers 1C Company released a real-life nude calendar with copies of the game. When American President Barack Obama visited Poland in May 2011, Polish Prime Minister Donald Tusk gave him several gifts, including the Collector's Edition of The Witcher 2.

=== Enhanced Edition ===
On 27 January 2012, CD Projekt Red announced an "Enhanced Edition" of The Witcher 2 via its sister company GOG.com. It was released on 17 April 2012 on the Xbox 360 and on Windows via Steam and GOG.com. All existing owners of The Witcher 2 received free upgrades to the Enhanced Edition, and could pre-load the update starting 11 April 2012. All new copies on PC and Xbox 360 shipped with the additional content on board. The Witcher 2: Assassins of Kings Enhanced Edition includes all content from the base game and added over 10 GB of new content, including four hours of gameplay, arena mode, a new tutorial, 36 minutes of cinematics including a new intro created by Platige Image, and an outro, as well as a host of fixes to gameplay and the interface.

== Reception ==
=== Critical reception ===
Reception

Aggregate score
Aggregator	Score
Metacritic	PC: 88/100; X360: 88/100

Review scores
Publication	Score
Destructoid	6/10
Edge	6/10
Eurogamer	9/10
Game Informer	9.5/10
GameRevolution	4/5
GameSpot	9/10
GamesRadar+	10/10
GamesTM	8/10
GameTrailers	9.4/10
IGN	9/10
Joystiq	4/5

Awards
Publication	Award
European Games Awards	Best European Game
Shacknews	2011 Game of the Year

The Witcher 2: Assassins of Kings received "generally favorable" reviews. It has won over 50 awards for best graphics, best adaptation or use of a license, best story, best PC game, best RPG, and Game of the Year. During the 15th Annual Interactive Achievement Awards, the Academy of Interactive Arts & Sciences nominated The Witcher 2 for "Role-Playing/Massively Multiplayer Game of the Year".

Critics praised combat mechanics, customization, graphics, environments, immersion, and storytelling. PC Gamer felt that combat mechanics and the game's ending were the weaker points of the game. 1UP's Tom Chick gave the game a glowing 'A' rating and cited its "rich graphics that don't have to be flashy, complex challenging combat, and superlative low-fantasy writing". The game garnered some perfect scores, with GamePro saying that "The Witcher 2 embodies everything that's good about PC development, and everything that makes it, in my mind, the best platform out there." Game Informer gave the game a "platinum score" and mentioned that "the brilliant dark fantasy adventure is just as good on console" as it was on PC.

A source of contention about the game is the difficulty of the combat, especially during the game's first hours. Some sources such as Eurogamer have praised the difficulty of the prologue, explaining "[the game] treats you not as a player ... but as an adult, free to make your own mistakes and suffer a plot in which not everyone gets what they deserve".

The game was criticized for what Rock, Paper, Shotgun characterized as gratuitous nudity, especially in the topless scene of the character Maria Louisa La Valette, who is said to show "brazen breasts" while being threatened with torture, her breasts sexualizing a scene that should be gravely serious. Other critics felt the scene was simply being realistic, in that a woman in the real world who is about to be tortured would probably have bare breasts.

In June 2014, the game garnered mainstream media coverage when United States President Barack Obama mentioned the video game in his speech in Poland. He said:

The last time I was here, [Polish Prime Minister] Donald [Tusk] gave me a gift, the video game developed here in Poland that's won fans the world over, The Witcher. I confess, I'm not very good at video games, but I've been told that it is a great example of Poland's place in the new global economy. And it's a tribute to the talents and work ethic of the Polish people as well as the wise stewardship of Polish leaders like Prime Minister Tusk.

=== Sales ===
The Witcher 2 had reportedly sold more than 940,000 copies by August 2011, a sales rate that CD Projekt Red had projected. Of the 940,000 copies sold, 200,000 were online sales (digital sales).

Additional statistics for online sales were reported in November 2011. Direct2Drive, Impulse, and Gamersgate's combined sales were a total of 10,000 units. GOG sold 40,000 copies. Within the same time period, 200,000 copies of The Witcher 2 were sold on Steam.

By May 2012, the game had sold 1.7 million copies. By February 2013, the combined sales of the game and its predecessor exceeded 5 million. By March 2014, The Witcher series had sold 7 million copies of both games. By September 2014, the series reached 8 million copies.

CD Projekt CEO Michał Nowakowski stated in January 2026 that The Witcher 2: Assassins of Kings has sold over 15 million copies worldwide.

== Sequel ==
The Witcher 3: Wild Hunt was announced by CD Projekt Red on 5 February 2013, and was released on 19 May 2015 for PlayStation 4, Windows and Xbox One.
