= The Witcher (video game) =

2007 video game

- Developer: CD Projekt Red
- Publishers: CEE: CD Projekt; NA/EU/AS/AU: Atari (Note: Published digitally by CD Projekt)
- Director: Jacek Brzeziński
- Producer: Maciej Miąsik
- Designer: Michał Madej
- Programmer: Maciej Siniło
- Artist: Adam Badowski
- Writers: Artur Ganszyniec; Sebastian Stępień; Marcin Blacha
- Composers: Adam Skorupa; Paweł Blaszczak
- Series: The Witcher
- Engine: Aurora Engine
- Platforms: Windows, Mac OS X
- Release: EU: 26 October 2007; NA: 30 October 2007; AU: 9 November 2007; Enhanced Edition: Windows; NA: 16 September 2008; EU: 19 September 2008; AU: 30 September 2008; Mac OS X; 5 April 2012
- Genre: Action role-playing
- Mode: Single-player

The Witcher (Polish: Wiedźmin pronounced [ˈvʲɛd͡ʑmʲin]) is a 2007 action role-playing game developed by CD Projekt Red for Windows and Mac OS X. It was based on the fantasy novel series The Witcher by Polish author Andrzej Sapkowski. The game's story takes place after the events of the main saga.

The Witcher received positive reviews from critics. A console version, The Witcher: Rise of the White Wolf, was scheduled for release in 2009 using an entirely new engine and combat system. This was suspended as a result of payment problems with console developers Widescreen Games. A sequel, The Witcher 2: Assassins of Kings, was released in 2011. The third installment, The Witcher 3: Wild Hunt released in 2015 and the fourth, The Witcher 4 is planned to release in 2028.

A remake of The Witcher was announced in October 2022, which was formerly first teased under the codename "Canis Majoris". Entitled The Witcher Remake, it will be developed using Unreal Engine 5, the same engine in use for the planned second trilogy. Fool's Theory will mainly develop the remake with full creative supervision from The Witcher series staff and CD Projekt Red.

== Gameplay ==
A screenshot of The Witcher showing the lighting and the "over-the-shoulder" camera

There are three camera styles available in The Witcher: two isometric perspectives, where the mouse is used to control most functions, and an over-the-shoulder view, which brings the player closer to the in-game combat while limiting vision. In all three views the controls can be changed to be primarily mouse focused or a combined keyboard and mouse approach.

The story takes place in a medieval fantasy world and follows Geralt of Rivia, one of a few traveling monster hunters who have supernatural powers, known as Witchers. Players can choose one of three fighting styles to use in different situations and against different foes. The fast style allows for more rapid, less-damaging attacks with a higher chance of hitting faster enemies; the strong style deals more damage in exchange for a slow attack speed, and a lower chance to hit faster enemies; and the group style features sweeping attacks best used if Geralt is surrounded. The player can switch between the styles at any point. Both of Geralt's main swords also have distinctively different combat styles from other weaponry, and serve specific purposes. The steel blade is used to fight humans and other flesh-and-blood beings, while the silver sword is more effective against supernatural monsters and beasts (against some of which steel may have no effect whatsoever). With precise timing, the player can link Geralt's attacks into combos to damage enemies more effectively.

Alchemy is a significant part of the gameplay. The player can create potions that increase health or endurance regeneration, allow Geralt to see in the dark, or provide other beneficial effects. The recipes for these potions can be learned through scrolls, or by experimentation. Once the player creates an unknown potion, he can choose to drink it, but if the potion is a failure it will poison or have other harmful effects on Geralt. Each time Geralt drinks potions, they increase the toxicity level of his body. This can be reduced by drinking a special potion or by meditating at an inn or fireplace. In addition to potions, the player can create oils used to augment the damage done by weapons. They can also create bombs for use as weapons in combat. Neither can be created until talent points have been allocated into the corresponding skills.

A time-delayed decision-consequence system means that the repercussions of players' decisions will make themselves apparent in plot devices in later acts of the game. This helps avert a save-reload approach to decision making. It also adds to the game's replay value, as the consequences resulting from the player's decisions can lead to significant differences in the events that take place later, and ultimately a very different gameplay experience than in prior playthroughs. The player often finds themselves choosing between the lesser of two evils.

== Plot ==
=== Setting and characters ===
Set in the Continent of the Witcher franchise, the player assumes the role of Geralt of Rivia, a wandering genetically enhanced monster hunter for hire. The game takes place around five years after the events of The Lady of the Lake. Geralt is accompanied by his longtime allies and fellow witchers, Eskel, Lambert, and instructor Vesemir, as well as sorceress Triss Merigold of Maribor and the field medic Shani. In addition, characters in the game originally from the books include Geralt's companions Dandelion the poet, the dwarf Zoltan Chivay, King Foltest of Temeria, his daughter Princess Adda (who was previously cursed into the form of a striga, but was cured by Geralt), King Radovid of Redania, and the spectral King of the Wild Hunt, a conqueror from another world. Characters original to the game include the boy Alvin, the sorcerer Azar Javed, the mercenary Professor, and Jacques de Alderberg, the Grand Master of the religious faction Order of the Flaming Rose.

=== Plot ===
Geralt awakens at the School of the Wolf's mountain fortress Kaer Morhen, with no memory of who he is or how he arrived there. He is taken in by his witcher brothers as well as Triss Merigold, who seeks a remedy for his mysterious condition. Kaer Morhen is suddenly attacked by an unknown group of assailants, who escape with the School of the Wolf's key mutagens and formulae that detail how to create witchers. Pursuing this faction, Geralt travels to the Temerian capital Vizima. On the way, he saves Alvin, a magically gifted peasant child. Triss determines that Alvin is a Source, a genetic magic prodigy similar to Ciri, Geralt's foster daughter. The player has the choice of leaving Alvin in the care of either Triss or Shani, a Redanian medic and Geralt's friend. Alvin is given a magical amulet meant to keep his abilities in check while he learns magic.

Geralt pursues several leads on the group which attacked Kaer Morhen and learns that they are known as Salamandra, and ostensibly led by the foreign mage Azar Javed. To further complicate matters, tensions are high in the city due to the conflict between the religious fanatics the Order of the Flaming Rose, and the elven terrorist faction the Scoia'tael. With the help of various allies in Vizima, Geralt assaults a Salamandra base in Vizima and kills the Professor, a dangerous mercenary in the employ of the criminal syndicate, but is then betrayed by Princess Adda and is teleported to a village on the outskirts of the city by Triss. The previously peaceful hamlet becomes a battleground when armed conflict breaks out between the Order of the Flaming Rose and the Scoia'tael. Geralt is forced to choose to support either faction, or make enemies of them both. Alvin is frightened and, using his Source abilities, magically disappears.

When Geralt returns to Vizima, he finds that Temeria's regent King Foltest has also returned while Adda has relapsed in her curse and is in striga form once more. Under Foltest's direction, Geralt either assists the knights or the elves to restore order to the city as well as deals with Adda. Geralt then storms the Salamandra headquarters and kills Azar Javed, only to find that the gang's true leader is Jacques de Aldersberg, the Grand Master of the Order of the Flaming Rose. Foltest hires Geralt under a contract to slay Jacques to end the Salamandra threat. Geralt confronts Jacques, who explains that due to his Source abilities he has seen the eventual extinction of humanity because of the world-ending White Frost, and was attempting to engineer a genetically enhanced superior race of humans to survive this apocalypse. Geralt is also confronted by the King of the Wild Hunt, who warns him of an impending conflict.

After Geralt defeats and slays Jacques, he notices the Grand Master was wearing the same amulet as Alvin, revealing that de Aldersberg was actually the village boy he saved earlier, who traveled back in time by accident. After Geralt returns to Foltest with news of his success, the king is attacked by an assassin. Geralt defeats the assassin, who is revealed to be another Witcher.

== Development ==
Before CD Projekt's involvement, Metropolis Software (which CD Projekt bought in 2009 and closed in 2010) had obtained a license from Andrzej Sapkowski for his novels in The Witcher series, around 1997. However, due to several other projects that the studio was involved in at the time, and concerns from their publisher TopWare about the materials' international appeal, the project never got further than some initial media and a playable level.

CD Projekt later approached Sapkowski for rights for the series. They were able to secure the rights for about 35,000 zloty (approximately US$9,500) from Sapkowski, who wanted all the payment upfront, rather than through royalties, even though these were offered to him. In a 2017 interview, Sapkowski said that at the time he had no interest in video games, and was only looking at the deal from a financial benefit standpoint.

The developers cited the Gothic series of role-playing games as a primary influence. CD Project had localized and published Gothic (released in Poland in 2002) and Gothic II (in 2003) in Poland. Both games as well as Gothic 3 (released in 2006) became very popular in Poland and therefore a success for CD Project as a regional publisher of said games. CD Project received Business Gazelle awards in 2003 and 2004.

=== Game engine ===
The Witcher is powered by a modified version of the Aurora Engine by BioWare, but using its own rendering engine, optimized heavily for the game's singleplayer requirements. Many changes have been introduced to the original engine; some of them are described below.

One of the most important changes to the Aurora Engine involved developing the in-game environments in 3ds Max and then exporting them into the game engine, rather than using a tile-based system. This allowed the developers to make every environment unique from the others, rather than recycling the same tiled objects over and over again in different environments. CD Projekt's version of the engine also supports lightmaps generated in 3ds Max. Shadows created this way are reported to look more realistic, and provide better game performance.

The modified engine also includes texture paint, a special tool that allows the developer to paint the environment using custom textures. New realistic skyboxes and water effects designed specifically for The Witcher were added to the engine. Natural light during various phases of the day is realistically altered, and the day and night transitions serve to enrich the game's ambiance. The weather can dynamically change between various states, such as clear skies, light rainfall or thunderstorms.

Other significant changes include motion-captured animation, improved physics modeling, new mechanics, and a new combat system. Additional modifications include the introduction of portals and the inclusion of other graphical effects, such as glows, advanced dynamic shadows, blurs and others.

=== Localization ===
All the female portrait cards shown after Geralt's "sexual conquests" were censored ("retouched to a more modest standard") for the U.S. release version. The in-game dryad was also reskinned, so her hair covered more of her body in this release. Some of the previously censored content, such as the romance cards, were uncensored for the Enhanced Edition.

Some dialogue between characters is shortened in the non-Polish-language versions. Lead designer Michal Madej has disputed claims by fans that this was due to the sometimes crude language, but that the decision to edit down dialogue occurred because of production-related concerns in game development. Proofreader Martin Pagan noticed this shortened version during his work, and writer Sande Chen confirmed that it was not due to censorship. Fans have theorized that it may have been done for voice acting cost savings, especially since much of the vulgar language has been retained.

=== Publication ===
On 31 August 2006, Atari Europe announced they would publish and distribute the game in Western Europe and Asian territories. A North American publishing and distribution deal with fellow subsidiary Atari, Inc. was later announced on 5 February 2007. CD Projekt self-published the game throughout Central and Eastern Europe, including Poland.

=== Enhanced Edition ===
At Game Developers Conference 2008, CD Projekt Red announced an enhanced version of the game, which was released on 16 September 2008. The significant changes featured in the enhanced version are over 200 new animations, additional NPC models, and recoloring of generic NPC models as well as monsters, vastly expanded and corrected dialogues in translated versions, improved stability, redesigned inventory system and load times reduced by roughly 80%. In addition, all bugs are said to be fixed, and the game manual completely overhauled. There are also two new adventures available to play through: Side Effects and The Price of Neutrality. A new option is to set the language of the voice acting and text separately. For instance, players can now choose to play the game with Polish voices and English subtitles. Other featured languages are Russian, Italian, French, Spanish, German, Czech, Hungarian, and Chinese.

Aside from the game enhancements, The Witcher Enhanced Edition includes a "making of" DVD, a CD with 29 in-game soundtracks, another CD with "Inspired by" music, the short story The Witcher from the book The Last Wish, a map of Temeria printed on high-quality paper, and the official strategy guide. In addition, a new and enhanced version of the D'jinni Adventure Editor is on the DVD with the two new Adventures. The game updates, as well as the box's extras, are available as a free download for owners of the original version who registered their game on the official forum. Furthermore, old savegames are compatible with the Enhanced Edition.

According to CD Projekt co-founder Michal Kicinski, the Enhanced Edition required a $1 million investment, and the company had shipped 300,000 copies of the retail version worldwide as of December 2008.

CD Projekt released a Director's Cut version of the game in North America on 31 July 2009. It is equal to the Enhanced Edition available to the rest of the world, but without the censorship applied to the North American version. The company has since released an official uncensoring patch that makes the North American version the same as the international for those who have purchased a boxed version of the game.

=== Console version ===
On 29 November 2008, a video covering the console version of the game was uploaded on the Internet. On 2 December, CD Projekt Red officially confirmed that The Witcher would be ported to PlayStation 3 and Xbox 360 consoles and released as The Witcher: Rise of the White Wolf. It had been built from the ground up for Widescreen Games' DaVinci Engine and featured a host of differences. According to CD Projekt Red senior designer Jakub Styliński, the game featured a new interface, redesigned boss battles, new music, "a smattering of new models", and a redesigned character development system, in addition to an entirely new action-oriented combat system with enhanced AI, additional motion-capture animations and the ability to directly control Geralt's defensive maneuvers. CD Projekt also confirmed that Rise of the White Wolf would have featured downloadable content.

On 29 April 2009, it was announced that the production of the game had been halted due to late payments from CD Projekt to the French developers of the console version, Widescreen Games. A release from CD Projekt's CEO Michał Kiciński stated that payments were delayed due to Widescreen Games not meeting development deadlines, additionally saying "technical incapability created a risk of missing planned quality" and that CD Projekt had ended their association with the company.

== Reception ==
Reception

Aggregate score
Aggregator	Score
Metacritic	81/100 (Enhanced Edition) 86/100

Review scores
Publication	Score
1Up.com	B−
Eurogamer	7/10
GamePro	4.5/5
GameSpot	8.5/10
GameSpy	4.5/5
GameZone	8.8/10
IGN	8.5/10

Awards
Publication	Award
GameSpy	PC RPG of the Year
IGN	Best of 2007, Best RPG

The game received mostly positive reviews. The game's cumulative score stands at 81 out of 100 on Metacritic. Michael Lafferty from GameZone gave the game 8.8 out of 10, describing it as a deep, immersive game that will "ask you to think and make choices, not just hack and slash your way to glory". The Witcher's cinematic intro was nominated for the 2007 VES Awards in the category of Outstanding Pre-Rendered Visuals in a Video Game, and the game's soundtrack was voted "Best Fantasy Game Soundtrack" in the 2007 Radio Rivendell Fantasy Awards.

During the 11th Annual Interactive Achievement Awards, the Academy of Interactive Arts and Sciences named The Witcher as one of the nominees for 2007's "Role-Playing Game of the Year"; however, it was eventually awarded to Mass Effect.

In 2010, the game was included as one of the titles in the book 1001 Video Games You Must Play Before You Die.

For many years, CD Projekt Red did not publicly disclose detailed sales figures for The Witcher. In 2026, CD Projekt co-CEO Michał Nowakowski revealed updated lifetime sales data in a public statement on social media. According to Nowakowski, The Witcher (2007) has sold over 10 million copies worldwide. He also noted that the game continues to generate sales years after its original release.
