= The Witcher (video game series) =

Video game series by CD Projekt RED

- Logo since 2015
- Genres: Action role-playing Digital tabletop game Multiplayer online battle arena Digital collectible card game
- Developers: CD Projekt Red; Breakpoint one2tribe Can Explode Games; Fuero Games; Spokko; Crunching Koalas; Fool's Theory
- Publishers: CD Projekt; Atari (2007); Hands-On Mobile; Spokko
- Platforms: Windows; Xbox 360; macOS; Linux; Xbox One; PlayStation 4; Nintendo Switch; Xbox Series X/S; PlayStation 5; Nintendo Switch 2; Java ME; Windows Phone; Android; iOS
- First release: The Witcher; 26 October 2007
- Latest release: Roach Race; September 6, 2022
- Parent series: The Witcher

The Witcher (Polish: Wiedźmin) is a fantasy action role-playing game series developed by CD Projekt Red and published by CD Projekt. It is based on the book series of the same name by Polish writer Andrzej Sapkowski, acting as non-canonical sequels to the story of the books.

The main series began in 2007 with the release of The Witcher, and concluded with 2015's The Witcher 3: Wild Hunt. As of 2022, the series has three main standalone games, two expansion packs and seven spin-off games. The series has sold 90 million units by September 2026.

In March 2022, a fourth installment of the franchise was announced to be in early development and is planned as the start of a new trilogy for the series. In October 2022, a remake of The Witcher was announced. Fool's Theory will mainly develop the game with full creative supervision from The Witcher series staff and CD Projekt Red. Another game will also be developed by The Molasses Flood and created with support from CDPR.

The series has spawned a series of graphic novels published by Dark Horse Comics.

== Gameplay ==
The series revolves around Geralt of Rivia, a skilled monster hunter, and his adventures in a fantasy world of magic, political intrigue, and dangerous creatures. The gameplay mainly focuses on exploration, combat, and decision-making as the player navigates Geralt in the game world, completing quests, and fighting enemies. The series is known for its intricate narratives, morally ambiguous choices, and attention to detail in creating rich and immersive worlds for players to explore.

The games are represented in a third-person view perspective in a partially open world environment. During the game, the player is faced with difficult decisions that affect the ending of the story and the game world. The choices players make in The Witcher games can have immediate and long-term consequences, affecting relationships between characters, opening up new quests and storylines.

The quests have multiple solutions and branching paths, depending on the player's choices, adding to the game's replayability and encouraging exploration. Many quests involve interacting with NPCs and building relationships with them, which can lead to different outcomes and branching paths in the story. The series also features a variety of quest types, including main story quests, side quests, contracts, and treasure hunts. Each quest type offers a unique challenge and reward, ranging from advancing the story to obtaining rare loot or unlocking new areas.

Potions are consumable items that Geralt can use to temporarily enhance his abilities. Players can choose which skills to invest in based on their preferred playstyle and customize Geralt's skills to their liking. In addition to potions and abilities, the game also includes equipment upgrades such as weapons and armor that can further enhance Geralt's abilities. Crafting and upgrading gear is another important aspect of the game where players must gather resources and work with crafters to create the gear that best suits Geralt's needs.

== Releases ==
Release timeline
2007	The Witcher
2007	Crimson Trail
2008	Versus
2009–2010
2011	Assassins of Kings
2012–2013
2014	Adventure Game
2015	Battle Arena
2015	Wild Hunt
2015	Hearts of Stone
2016	Blood and Wine
2017
2018	Gwent
2018	Thronebreaker
2019–2020
2021	Monster Slayer
2022	Gwent: Rogue Mage
2022	Roach Race
2023–2026
2027	Songs of the Past
2028	The Witcher IV
TBA	The Witcher Remake
TBA	Project Sirius

Year	Title	Platform(s)		
Year	Title	PC	Console	Handheld
Main titles
2007	The Witcher	Windows; macOS	-	-
2011	The Witcher 2: Assassins of Kings	Windows; macOS; Linux	Xbox 360	-
2015	The Witcher 3: Wild Hunt	Windows	Xbox One; Xbox Series X/S; PlayStation 4; PlayStation 5	Nintendo Switch; Nintendo Switch 2
2028	The Witcher IV	Windows	Xbox Series X/S; PlayStation 5	-
TBA	The Witcher Remake	TBA		
Expansion packs
2015	The Witcher 3: Wild Hunt – Hearts of Stone	Windows	Xbox One; Xbox Series X/S; PlayStation 4; PlayStation 5	Nintendo Switch; Nintendo Switch 2
2016	The Witcher 3: Wild Hunt – Blood and Wine	Windows	Xbox One; Xbox Series X/S; PlayStation 4; PlayStation 5	Nintendo Switch; Nintendo Switch 2
2027	The Witcher 3: Wild Hunt – Songs of the Past	Windows	Xbox Series X/S; PlayStation 5	Nintendo Switch 2
Spin-offs
2007	The Witcher: Crimson Trail	-	-	Java ME
2008	The Witcher: Versus	Browser	-	iOS
2014	The Witcher Adventure Game	Windows; macOS	-	Android; iOS
2015	The Witcher Battle Arena	-	-	Android; iOS; Windows Phone
2018	Gwent: The Witcher Card Game	Windows; macOS	Xbox One; PlayStation 4	Android; iOS
2018	Thronebreaker: The Witcher Tales	Windows	Xbox One; PlayStation 4	Nintendo Switch; Android; iOS
2021	The Witcher: Monster Slayer	-	-	Android; iOS
2022	Gwent: Rogue Mage	Windows; macOS	-	Android; iOS
2022	Roach Race	-	-	Android; iOS
TBA	Project Sirius	TBA		

== Main series ==
=== The Witcher ===
In 1996 and 1997, a Witcher (Polish: Wiedźmin) video game was being developed by Metropolis Software in Poland, but it was canceled. The game's director was Adrian Chmielarz, former People Can Fly co-owner and creative director, who coined the translation "The Witcher" during its development. According to Chmielarz, the game would have been a 3D action-adventure game with role-playing elements such as moral choices and experience points.

In 2003, Polish video-game developer CD Projekt Red negotiated with Sapkowski for rights to The Witcher, given the languishing work at Metropolis, and released The Witcher, a role-playing game based on the saga in October 2007 for personal computers. It was well-publicized and, although it was the developer's first game, it received critical praise in Europe and North America. The Witcher was published in Poland and Central and Eastern Europe by CD Projekt and the rest of the world by Atari. A console version, The Witcher: Rise of the White Wolf with the same story and a different engine and combat system, was scheduled for release in fall 2009 but was canceled that spring. The game's story takes place around five years after the events of the main book saga.

=== The Witcher 2: Assassins of Kings ===
The Witcher 2: Assassins of Kings (Polish: Wiedźmin 2: Zabójcy królów) is the sequel to The Witcher, developed by CD Projekt Red. On 16 September 2009, before Assassins of Kings was introduced, a video of the game was leaked; two days later, CD Projekt Red confirmed that it was in development. Assassins of Kings was published by CD Projekt, with distribution held by Namco Bandai Partners in Europe and by Atari in North America. The game was also distributed digitally through Steam and DRM-free on Good Old Games. It takes place around half a year after the events of the first game.

=== The Witcher 3: Wild Hunt ===
The Witcher 3: Wild Hunt (Polish: Wiedźmin 3: Dziki Gon) was released on 19 May 2015 and quickly came to be considered one of the greatest video games of all time, shipping over ten million copies by March 2016. Subsequently, two expansion packs were released, The Witcher 3: Wild Hunt – Hearts of Stone (Polish: Wiedźmin 3: Dziki Gon – Serca z kamienia) in 2015 and The Witcher 3: Wild Hunt – Blood and Wine (Polish: Wiedźmin 3: Dziki Gon – Krew i wino) in 2016. The game was updated in December 2022 with a variety of visual enhancements and gameplay tweaks.

=== The Witcher Remake ===
A remake of The Witcher (2007) which was formerly first teased under the codename, Canis Majoris. The original game will be rebuilt from the ground up in Unreal Engine 5 by Fool's Theory with full creative supervision from The Witcher series staff and CD Projekt Red.

=== The Witcher 4 ===
Polaris is a codename for the next installment in The Witcher series. It will use Unreal Engine 5 instead of REDengine, which the two previous games used. The game is to be the beginning of a new saga. CDPR aim to release two more Witcher games after Polaris, creating a new AAA RPG trilogy. In November 2024, CD Projekt Red announced that the game entered a full-scale production. In December 2024, a cinematic reveal trailer has been presented at The Games Awards show featuring Ciri, now a witcher, as the protagonist of the new game.

== Spin-offs ==
=== The Witcher: Crimson Trail ===
The Witcher: Crimson Trail (Polish: Wiedźmin: Krwawy szlak, "The Witcher: Bloody Trail"), also known as The Witcher Mobile, is a mobile-phone action game created by Breakpoint on license from CD Projekt in November 2007. It features a young Geralt as a promising student who has completed his training to become a monster-slayer – a witcher.

=== The Witcher Adventure Game ===
The Witcher Adventure Game (Polish: Wiedźmin: Gra przygodowa) is a digital adaptation of the board game of the same name released in 2014.

=== The Witcher Battle Arena ===
CD Projekt Red announced The Witcher Battle Arena, a free-to-play multiplayer online battle arena game for mobile devices, on 1 July 2014. It shut down at the end of 2015.

=== Gwent: The Witcher Card Game ===
Gwent: The Witcher Card Game (Polish: Gwint: Wiedźmińska gra karciana) is a digital collectible card game released in 2018.

=== Thronebreaker: The Witcher Tales ===
In October 2018, CD Projekt Red released Thronebreaker: The Witcher Tales (Polish: Wojna Krwi: Wiedźmińskie Opowieści, "War of Blood: The Witcher Tales"), a turn-based roleplaying game with similar gameplay to the free-to-play card game Gwent: The Witcher Card Game. In Thronebreaker's thirty-hour-long campaign, the player takes the control of Queen Meve, the ruler of Lyria and Rivia, during the events that precede the first Witcher game. The game world consists of five regions never explored in The Witcher game franchise before: Rivia, Lyria, Angren, Mahakam and Lower Aedirn. The title received generally favorable reviews.

=== The Witcher: Monster Slayer ===
The Witcher: Monster Slayer (Polish: Wiedźmin: Pogromca Potworów) was an augmented reality video game for mobile devices released in 2021.

=== Roach Race ===
Roach Race is a free-to-play platform, sidescroller game co-developed with Crunching Koalas. The game was released for iOS and Android on September 6, 2022. It has an embedded version as an arcade minigame in Cyberpunk 2077 which was released with Patch 1.6 the same day.

=== Project Sirius ===
Sirius is a codename for a game developed by The Molasses Flood and created with support from CDPR. It is said to differ from past productions, offering multiplayer gameplay on top of a single-player experience including a campaign with quests and a story. In March 2023, CD Projekt announced it had rebooted the game's development.

=== The Witcher: Old World and The Witcher: Legacy ===
CD Projekt Red worked with Go On Board to make multiple games based on The Witcher, such as The Witcher: Old World in 2023 and The Witcher: Legacy crowdfunded in 2025.

== Reception ==
=== Critical reception ===
Aggregate review scores
Game	Metacritic
The Witcher	81/100
The Witcher 2	(PC/360) 88/100
The Witcher 3	(PC) 93/100 (PS4) 92/100 (XBO) 91/100
The Witcher 3: Wild Hunt - Complete Edition	(PS5) 94/100 (XSXS) 94/100 (NS) 85/100

The Witcher series has received generally positive reception from critics and audiences alike.

The Witcher received mostly positive reception from critics. Praise was given towards its narrative, branching dialogues, adult themes, setting, RPG elements, leveling and alchemy system, and Geralt's character, though the combat, animations, movement and loading times were criticized.

The Witcher 2: Assassins of Kings was deemed an improvement over its predecessor in terms of combat mechanics, customization, graphics, environments, immersion, and storytelling. The major source of criticism was the difficulty of the combat, especially during the game's first few hours, and gratuitous nudity.

The Witcher 3: Wild Hunt received universal acclaim from critics and audiences alike, and has been named one of the greatest games of all time. Praise has been given for its gameplay, narrative, world design, combat, original soundtrack and visuals, although it received minor criticism due to technical issues.

=== Sales ===
The series had sold over 33 million units by March 2018, increasing to over 50 million units by May 2020. As of March 2023, the series has sold over 75 million units, of which over 50 million were of The Witcher 3: Wild Hunt. In January 2026, CD Projekt CEO Michał Nowakowski announced that The Witcher and The Witcher 2: Assassins of Kings had reached 10 million and 15 million units sold respectively, contributing to a cumulative franchise figure of 85 million units. The total makes it one of the best-selling video game franchises of all time.

=== Legal issues ===
In October 2018, Sapkowski sent notice to CD Projekt demanding he be remunerated for sales of The Witcher video games, asking for more than 60 million Polish złoty (more than US$15 million) representing between about 5% and 15% of the game's revenues over the years. Sapkowski had originally provided the license to CD Projekt based on a lump sum payment, but now believes he is due more since the series has become much more successful than expected. CD Projekt stated that while they had met all obligations on the initial acquisition of the license, they will work amicably with Sapkowski's legal representatives to come to a fair outcome for all parties. By February 2019, CD Projekt worked out a settlement agreement that would provide Sapkowski additional royalties for their video game series, though not as great as those Sapkowski had asked for, as to maintain a working relationship with the author for future Witcher projects. The settlement was finalized by December 2019.
