= The Player of Games =

1988 novel by Iain M. Banks

- First edition
- Author: Iain M. Banks
- Audio read by: Peter Kenny
- Cover artist: Richard Hopkinson
- Language: English
- Series: The Culture
- Genre: Science fiction
- Publisher: Macmillan
- Publication date: 1988
- Publication place: United Kingdom
- Media type: Print (Hardback & Paperback)
- Pages: 288
- ISBN: 0-333-47110-5
- OCLC: 59102973
- Preceded by: A Gift from the Culture
- Followed by: The State of the Art

The Player of Games is a 1988 science-fiction novel by Scottish writer Iain M. Banks. It was the second-published Culture novel.

== Plot ==
Jernau Morat Gurgeh, a famously skillful player of board games and other similar contests, lives on Chiark Orbital, and is bored with his successful life. The Culture's Special Circumstances (SC) inquires about his willingness to participate in a long journey but will not explain further unless Gurgeh agrees to participate. While he is considering this offer, one of his drone acquaintances, Mawhrin-Skel, which had been ejected from SC due to its unstable personality, convinces him to cheat in one of his games in an attempt to win in an unprecedentedly perfect fashion. The attempt fails, but Mawhrin-Skel uses its recording of the event to blackmail Gurgeh into accepting the offer with the condition that Mawhrin-Skel be admitted back into SC.

Gurgeh spends the next two years travelling to the Empire of Azad in the Small Magellanic Cloud, where a complex game (also named Azad) is used to determine social rank and political status. The game itself is sufficiently subtle and complex that a player's tactics reflect their own political and philosophical outlook. By the time he arrives, he has grasped the game but is unsure how he will measure up against opponents who have been studying it for their entire lives.

Gurgeh lands on the Empire's home planet of Eä, accompanied by another drone, Flere-Imsaho. As a Culture citizen, he naturally plays with a style markedly different from his opponents, many of whom stack the odds against him one way or another, including by forming backroom agreements to cooperate against him (which is allowed by the game's rules) and placing bets on the game requiring the castration of the loser. As he advances through the tournament he is matched against increasingly powerful Azad politicians, and ultimately the Emperor himself in the final round.

The final contests take place on Echronedal, the Fire Planet, which undergoes a periodic natural conflagration fueled by native plants that produce huge amounts of oxygen. The final game is timed to end when the flames engulf the castle where the event takes place, symbolically renewing the Empire by fire. Faced with defeat, the Emperor's men destroy the castle's fire-suppression systems and start a closer fire front, as the Emperor places cards representing this within the game. With the castle surrounded by fire, the Emperor attempts to kill Gurgeh. Instead, the Emperor is killed by a shot from his own weapon, deflected by Flere-Imsaho, who later refuses to tell Gurgeh if it was coincidental after rescuing him from the fire.

Flere-Imsaho reveals that Gurgeh's participation was part of a Culture plot to overthrow the corrupt and savage Empire from within, and that he, the player, was in fact a pawn in a much larger game. He is further told that in the aftermath of the final game, the Empire of Azad collapsed without further intervention from the Culture. Although Gurgeh never discovers the whole truth, in the final sentences of the novel the narrator is revealed to be Flere-Imsaho, who had been disguised as Mawhrin-Skel to manipulate Gurgeh into taking part in the game.

== Azad ==
Azad is a game played in the Empire of Azad. In the language of the fictional Empire the word "Azad" means "machine" or "system" and is applied to any complex entity such as animals, plants or artificial machines.

The game is described in detail, but the rules are never specified to the reader. It is primarily tactical and played on three-dimensional boards of various shapes and sizes, though earlier rounds may be played exclusively in cards. Typically the boards are large enough for players to walk around inside them to move or interact with their pieces. The number of players differs from game to game and also influences the tactics, as players can choose to cooperate or compete with one another. As well as skill and tactics, random events may influence gameplay (often as card games or other games of chance), and sometimes may change the outcome critically.

=== Game elements ===
The game consists of a number of minor games, such as card games and elemental die matching, which allow the players to build up their forces for use on the game's three giant boards (in order: the Board of Origin, the Board of Form, and finally the Board of Becoming) and a number of minor boards.

The game uses a variety of pieces to represent a player's units (military, resource or even philosophical premises). Some of the pieces are genetically engineered constructs, which may change form during the game according to their use and environment. These respond to their handling by a player and appear difficult to understand—during his training, Gurgeh is encouraged to sleep while holding some of the more important pieces so he can better understand them in play.

=== Significance ===
In the empire, the game is the main determinant of one's social status. The game is played in a tournament every "Great Year" (roughly every six Culture years), initially consisting of some 12,000 players in the main series. Through the various rounds, these are all whittled down until the final game, the victor of which becomes emperor. Players knocked out from the main series may take part in further games to determine their careers. The complexity of the game aims to represent reality to such a degree that a player's own political and philosophical outlook can be expressed in play (the idea being that rival ideologies are essentially "tested" in the game before the winners can apply them in reality). As the protagonist discovers, the game embodies the incumbent preferences of the social elite, reinforcing and reiterating the pre-existing gender and caste inclinations of the empire, putting the lie to the "fairness" which is generally perceived to govern the outcome of the tournament and thus the shape of Azadian society. In the novel, the protagonist ultimately finds that his (successful) tactics reflect the values of his own civilization, the Culture, though he also recognises that his own thought and behaviour have been markedly influenced by the manner in which he has been forced to compete. In a private audience with the emperor on the penultimate eve of the tournament, when confronted with the seeming absurdity of the possibility that a novice with a mere two years of experience at the game could systematically defeat players whose whole lives were devoted to its mastery, the protagonist comes to understand that his proficiency is merely a reflection of his experience with strategic games of all sorts. Given that, the Culture had intended all along to use him to discredit the brutality of the Azadian system by publicly giving the lie to the game's representation of social reality.

== Reception ==
In 2010, Kirkus Reviews described the book as "Predictable, certainly, and less imaginative than Consider Phlebas, but technically much more solid: honorably crafted work, often engrossing despite some sluggish patches."

== Legacy ==
A film version of the book was planned by Pathé in the 1990s, but was abandoned.

In 2015, SpaceX founder Elon Musk named two autonomous spaceport drone ships—Just Read the Instructions and Of Course I Still Love You—after ships in the book as a tribute to Banks, who had died in 2013.

Around 2018, deep-submergence vehicle (DSV) Limiting Factor was named after the sapient warship (provided to Gurgeh for transport) in the book. According to Victor Vescovo, who commissioned the DSV, "The naming of these vessels is a large tip of the hat and no small amount of admiration for Iain M Banks' brilliant science fiction series."

In 2021, Canadian singer Grimes released a song titled "Player of Games". Kotaku speculated that this was a reference to both the book and her relationship with Musk.

== Bibliography ==
- The Player of Games, Iain M. Banks, London : Macmillan, 1988, ISBN 0-333-47110-5 (paperback ISBN 1-85723-146-5)
