= Genre fiction =

Fictional works written with the intent of fitting into a specific literary genre

In the book-trade, genre fiction, also known as formula fiction, or commercial fiction, encompasses fictional works written with the intent of fitting into a specific literary genre in order to appeal to readers and fans already familiar with that genre. These labels commonly imply that this type of fiction places more value on plot and entertainment than on character development, philosophical themes, or artistic depth. This distinguishes genre fiction from literary fiction.

Popular genres include crime, fantasy, romance, science fiction and horror—as well as Western, inspirational and historical fiction.

Slipstream is sometimes thought to be in between genre and non-genre fiction.

== Genre and the marketing of fiction ==
In the publishing industry the term "category fiction" is often used as a synonym for genre fiction, with the categories serving as the familiar shelf headings within the fiction section of a bookstore, such as Western or mystery.

Some authors classified instead as literary fiction have written genre novels under pseudonyms, while others are argued to have employed genre elements in literary fiction.

Romance fiction had an estimated $1.375 billion share in the US book market in 2007. Religion/inspirational literature followed with $819 million, science fiction/fantasy with $700 million, mystery with $650 million and classic literary fiction with $466 million.

== History of genres ==
Genre began as a classification system for ancient Greek literature. Poetry, prose, and drama had specific calculated styles that related to the theme of the story. Among the genres were the epic in poetry and tragedy and comedy for plays. In later periods other genres such as the chivalric romance, opera, and prose fiction developed.

Though the novel is often seen as a modern genre – Ian Watt, in The Rise of the Novel (1957) suggests that the novel first came into being in the early 18th century – it has also been described as possessing "a continuous and comprehensive history of about two thousand years", from the time of both Classical Greece and Rome.

The "romance" is a closely related long prose narrative. Walter Scott defined it as "a fictitious narrative in prose or verse; the interest of which turns upon marvellous and uncommon incidents", whereas in the novel "the events are accommodated to the ordinary train of human events and the modern state of society". However, many romances, including the historical romances of Scott, Emily Brontë's Wuthering Heights and Herman Melville's Moby-Dick, are also frequently called novels, and Scott describes romance as a "kindred term". Romance, as defined here, should not be confused with the genre fiction love romance or romance novel. Other European languages do not distinguish between romance and novel: "a novel is le roman, der Roman, il romanzo."

Genre fiction developed from various subgenres of the novel (and its "romance" version) during the nineteenth century, along with the growth of the mass-marketing of fiction in the twentieth century: this includes the gothic novel, fantasy, science fiction, adventure novel, historical romance, and the detective novel. Some scholars see precursors to the genre fiction romance novels in literary fiction of the 18th and 19th centuries, including Samuel Richardson's sentimental novel Pamela, or Virtue Rewarded (1740) and the novels of Jane Austen such as Pride and Prejudice (1813).

Critics have often regarded genre fiction as having less artistic merit than literary fiction, but this assumption has been contested after the growth of fiction that blurs these boundaries and the serious study of genre fiction within universities.

== Genres ==
The following are some of the main genres as they are used in contemporary publishing:

=== Crime ===
Crime fiction is the literary genre that fictionalises crimes, their detection, criminals, and their motives. It is usually distinguished from mainstream fiction and other genres such as historical fiction or science fiction, but the boundaries are indistinct. Crime fiction has multiple subgenres, including detective fiction (such as the whodunit), courtroom drama, hard-boiled fiction, mystery fiction, and legal thrillers. Suspense and mystery are key elements to the genre.

=== Fantasy ===
Fantasy is a genre of fiction that uses magic or other supernatural elements as a main plot element, theme, or setting. Many works within the genre take place in imaginary worlds where magic and magical creatures are common. Fantasy is generally distinguished from the genres of science fiction and horror by the expectation that it steers clear of scientific and macabre themes, respectively, though there is a great deal of overlap among the three, all of which are subgenres of speculative fiction. Fantasy works frequently feature a medieval setting.

=== Romance ===
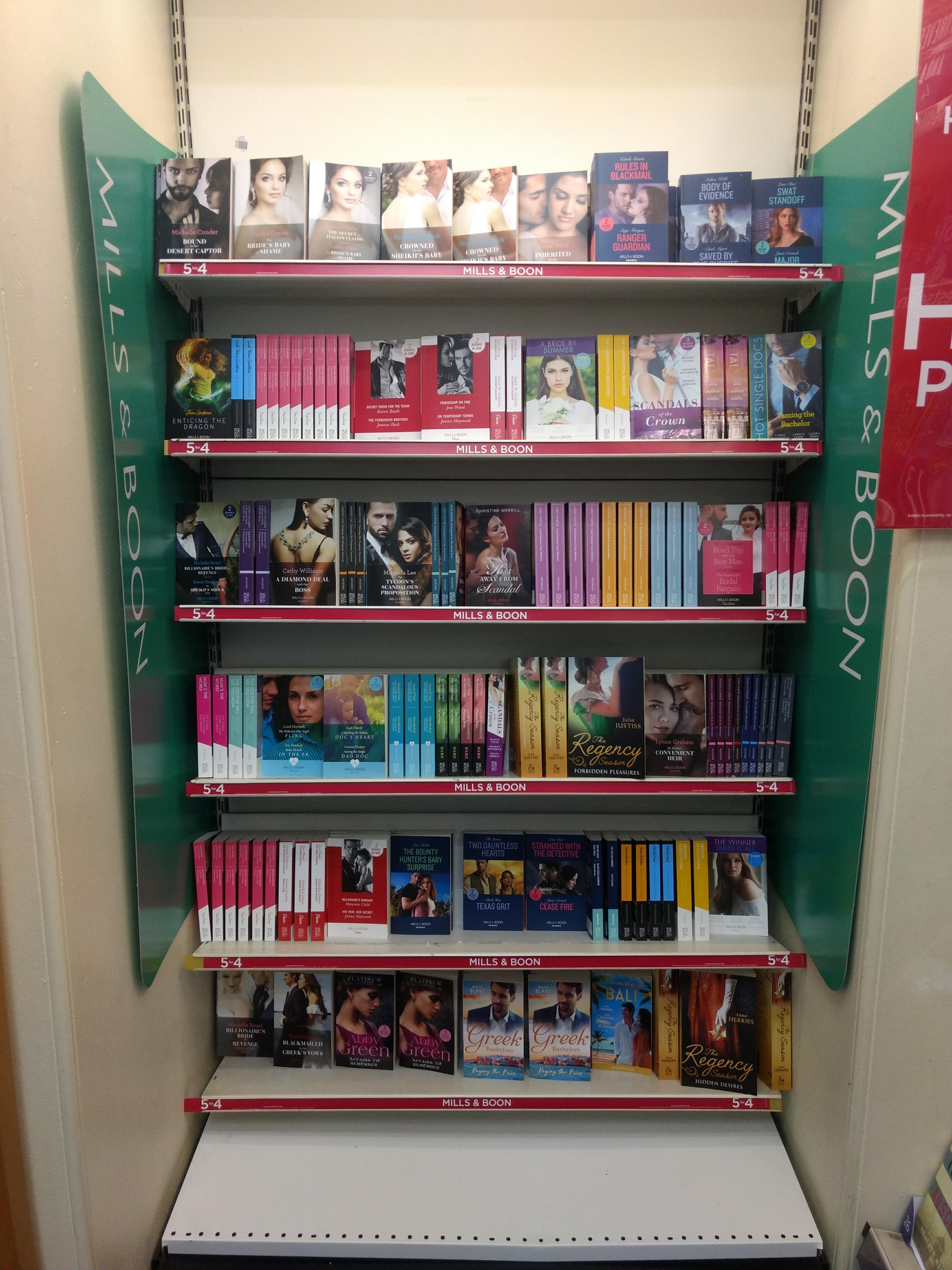
Romance novels

The romance novel or "romantic novel" primarily focuses on the relationship and romantic love between two people, and must have an "emotionally satisfying and optimistic ending." There are many subgenres of the romance novel including fantasy, historical, science fiction, same sex romantic fiction, and paranormal fiction.

According to Romance Writers of America's data, the most popular subgenres are romantic suspense, contemporary romance, historical romance, erotic romance, paranormal romance, and young adult romance.

The romantic novel is not to be confused with romance as a literary form, which Walter Scott defined as "a fictitious narrative in prose or verse; the interest of which turns upon marvellous and uncommon incidents".

- Other: Inspirational romance, chick-lit, category romance, women's fiction.

=== Science fiction ===
Science fiction is a genre of speculative fiction dealing with imaginative concepts such as futuristic science and technology, space travel, time travel, faster than light travel, parallel universes and extraterrestrial life. Science fiction often explores the potential consequences of scientific and other innovations, and has been called a "literature of ideas". It usually eschews the supernatural, and unlike the related genre of fantasy, historically science fiction stories were intended to have at least pretense of science-based fact or theory at the time the story was created, but this connection has become tenuous or non-existent in much of science fiction.

=== Horror ===
Horror fiction aims to frighten or disgust its readers. Although many horror novels feature supernatural phenomena or monsters, it is not a requirement. Early horror drew much inspiration from Romanticism and Gothic fiction. Modern horror, such as cosmic horror and splatterpunk, tends to be less melodramatic and more explicit. Horror is often mixed with other genres.

== Critical reception and controversies ==
Horror novelist Stephen King was awarded the Medal for Distinguished Contribution to American Letters in 2003, polarizing opinions and leading to debate on genre fiction's literary merit. Negative comments about genre fiction have sparked responses from Time, Salon, the Atlantic, and the Los Angeles Review of Books. Nobel laureate Doris Lessing described science fiction as "some of the best social fiction of our time", and called Greg Bear, author of Blood Music, "a great writer".

In the 2000s, the BBC defended itself against charges that it discussed genre fiction with a "sneering derogatory tone". The Man Booker Prize and British Book Awards have been criticized for ignoring genre fiction in their selection process.

Some critics have claimed that reading romance and suspense thrillers makes readers more sensitive, because these novels focus on interpersonal relationships.

== 19th-century British and Irish genre fiction ==
Sir John Barrow's descriptive 1831 account of the Mutiny on the Bounty immortalised the Royal Navy ship HMS Bounty and her people. The legend of Dick Turpin was popularised when the 18th-century English highwayman's exploits appeared in the novel Rookwood (1834) by William Harrison Ainsworth.

Although pre-dated by John Ruskin's The King of the Golden River in 1841, the history of the modern fantasy genre is generally said to begin with George MacDonald, the influential author of The Princess and the Goblin and Phantastes (1858). William Morris was a popular English poet who also wrote several fantasy novels during the latter part of the nineteenth century. Wilkie Collins' epistolary novel The Moonstone (1868) is generally considered the first detective novel in the English language, while The Woman in White is regarded as one of the finest sensation novels. H. G. Wells's (1866–1946) writing career began in the 1890s with science fiction novels like The Time Machine (1895), and The War of the Worlds (1898) which describes an invasion of late Victorian England by Martians, and Wells is seen, along with Frenchman Jules Verne (1828–1905), as a major figure in the development of the science fiction genre.

Penny dreadful publications were an alternative to mainstream works, and were aimed at working class adolescents, introducing the infamous Sweeney Todd. The premier ghost story writer of the 19th century was the Irish writer Sheridan Le Fanu. His works include the macabre mystery novel Uncle Silas 1865, and his Gothic novella Carmilla 1872, which tells the story of a young woman's susceptibility to the attentions of a female vampire. The vampire genre fiction began with John William Polidori's "The Vampyre" (1819). This short story was inspired by the life of Lord Byron and his poem The Giaour. An important later work is Varney the Vampire (1845), where many standard vampire conventions originated: Varney has fangs, leaves two puncture wounds on the neck of his victims, and has hypnotic powers and superhuman strength. Varney was also the first example of the "sympathetic vampire", who loathes his condition but is a slave to it. Bram Stoker, yet another Irish writer, was the author of the seminal horror work Dracula and featured as its primary antagonist the vampire Count Dracula, with the vampire hunter Abraham Van Helsing his arch-enemy. Dracula has been attributed to a number of literary genres including vampire literature, horror fiction, gothic novel and invasion literature.

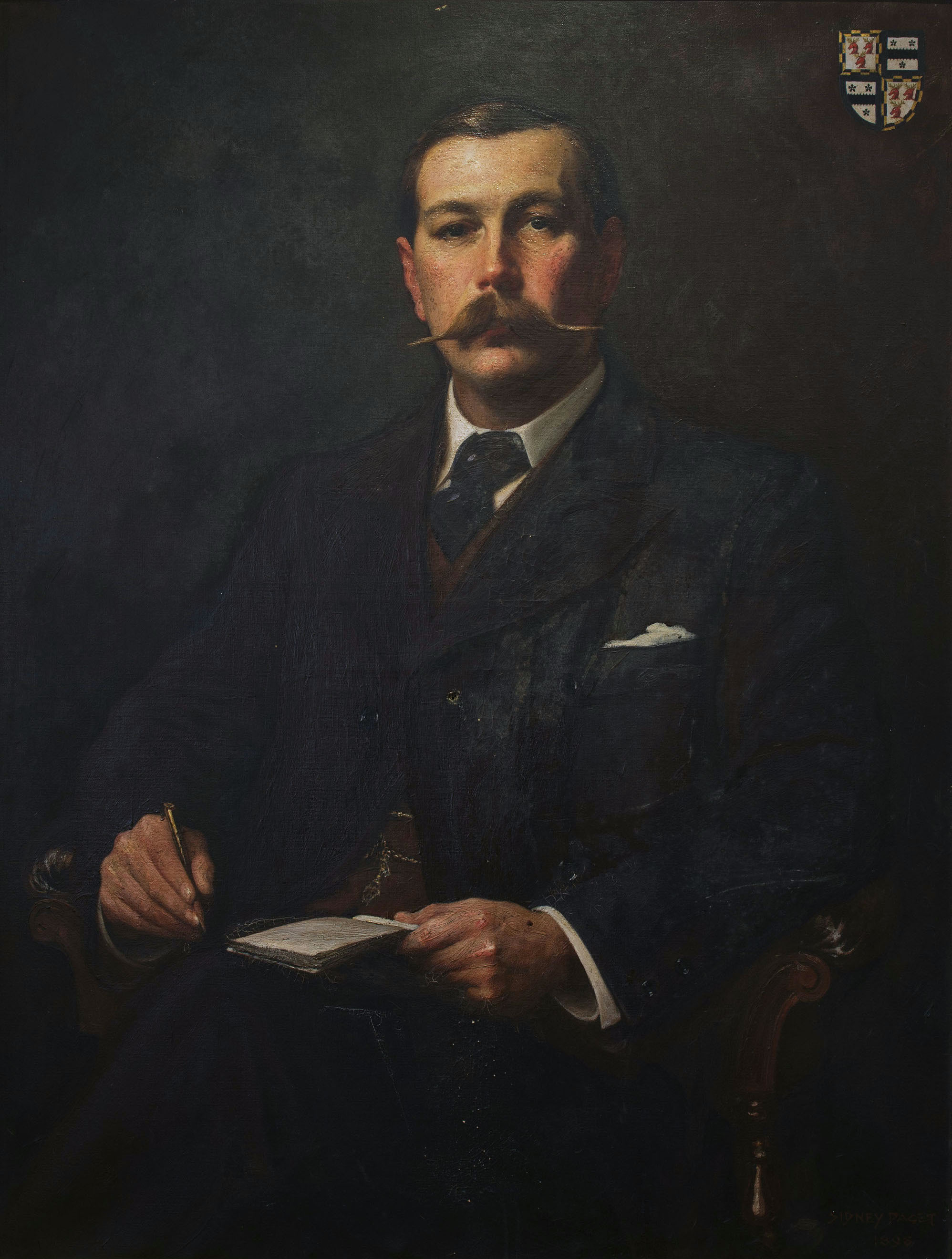
Sir Arthur Conan Doyle was born in Scotland of Irish parents but his Sherlock Holmes stories have typified a fog-filled London for readers worldwide.

Sir Arthur Conan Doyle's Sherlock Holmes is a brilliant London-based "consulting detective", famous for his intellectual prowess, skilful use of astute observation, deductive reasoning and forensic skills to solve difficult cases. Holmes' archenemy Professor Moriarty, is widely considered to be the first true example of a supervillain, while Sherlock Holmes has become a by-word for a detective. Conan Doyle wrote four novels and fifty-six short stories featuring Holmes, from 1880 up to 1907, with a final case in 1914. All but four Conan Doyle stories are narrated by Holmes' friend, assistant, and biographer, Dr John H. Watson.

== 20th-century genre fiction ==
=== Early 20th century ===
Erskine Childers' The Riddle of the Sands (1903) defined the spy novel and Follett has also called it "the first modern thriller".

Emma Orczy's The Scarlet Pimpernel (1903) was originally a highly successful play, when staged in London in 1905. The novel The Scarlet Pimpernel was published soon after the play opened and was an immediate success. Orczy gained a following of readers in Britain and throughout the world. The popularity of the novel, which recounted the adventures of a member of the English gentry in the French Revolutionary period, encouraged her to write a number of sequels for her "reckless daredevil" over the next 35 years. The play was performed to great acclaim in France, Italy, Germany and Spain, while the novel was translated into 16 languages. Subsequently, the story has been adapted for television, film, a musical and other media. Baroness Orczy's character The Old Man in the Corner (1908) was among the earliest armchair detectives to be created. Her short stories about Lady Molly of Scotland Yard (1910) were an early example of a female detective as main character.

John Buchan wrote the adventure novels on Prester John (1910) and four novels telling the adventures of Richard Hannay, of which the first, The Thirty-Nine Steps (1915) is the best known. Novels featuring a gentleman adventurer were popular in the interwar period, exemplified by the series of H. C. McNeile with Bulldog Drummond (1920) and Leslie Charteris, whose many books chronicled the adventures of Simon Templar, alias The Saint.

The medievalist scholar M. R. James wrote highly regarded ghost stories (1904–1928) in contemporary settings.

This was called the Golden Age of Detective Fiction. Agatha Christie, a writer of crime novels, short stories and plays, is best remembered for her 80 detective novels and her successful West End theatre plays. Christie's works, particularly those featuring the detectives Hercule Poirot or Miss Marple, made her one of the most important and innovative writers in the development of the genre. Her most influential novels include The Murder of Roger Ackroyd (1926; one of her most controversial novels, its innovative twist ending had a significant impact on the genre), Murder on the Orient Express (1934), Death on the Nile (1937) and And Then There Were None (1939). Other female writers dubbed "Queens of crime" include Dorothy L. Sayers (gentleman detective, Lord Peter Wimsey), Margery Allingham (Albert Campion, supposedly created as a parody of Sayers' Wimsey,) and New Zealander Ngaio Marsh (Roderick Alleyn). Georgette Heyer recreated the historical romance genre since 1921, and also wrote detective fiction (1932–1953).

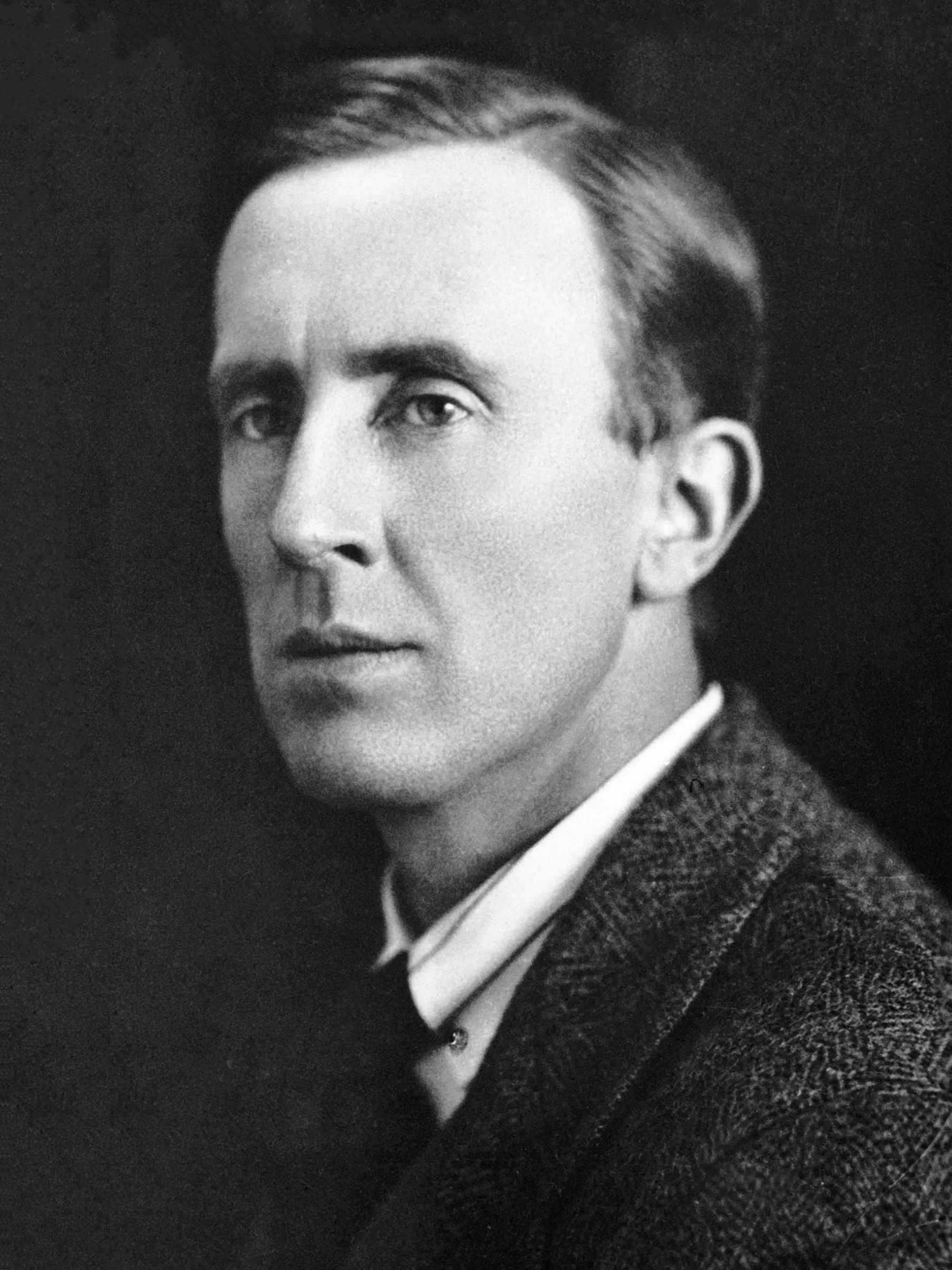
J. R. R. Tolkien

From the early 1930s to late 1940s, an informal literary discussion group associated with the English faculty at the University of Oxford, were the "Inklings". Its leading members were the major fantasy novelists; C. S. Lewis and J. R. R. Tolkien. Lewis is known for The Screwtape Letters (1942), The Chronicles of Narnia (1950–1956) and The Space Trilogy (1938–1945), while Tolkien is best known as the author of The Hobbit (1937), The Lord of the Rings (1954–1955), and The Silmarillion (1977).

=== Later 20th century ===
In thriller writing, Ian Fleming created the character James Bond 007 in January 1952, while on holiday at his Jamaican estate, Goldeneye. Fleming chronicled Bond's adventures in twelve novels, including Casino Royale (1953), Live and Let Die (1954), Dr. No (1958), Goldfinger (1959), Thunderball (1961), The Spy Who Loved Me (1962), and nine short story works.

In contrast to the larger-than-life spy capers of Bond, John le Carré was an author of spy novels who depicted a shadowy world of espionage and counter-espionage, and his best known novel The Spy Who Came in from the Cold (1963), is often regarded as one of the greatest in the genre. Frederick Forsyth also wrote thrillers, including The Day of the Jackal (1971), The Odessa File (1972), The Dogs of War (1974) and The Fourth Protocol (1984). Ken Follett writes spy thrillers, his first success being Eye of the Needle (1978), followed by The Key to Rebecca (1980), as well as historical novels, notably The Pillars of the Earth (1989), and its sequel World Without End (2007). Elleston Trevor is remembered for his 1964 adventure story The Flight of the Phoenix, while the thriller novelist Philip Nicholson is best known for Man on Fire. Peter George's Red Alert (1958), is a Cold War thriller.

War novels include Alistair MacLean thrillers The Guns of Navarone (1957), Where Eagles Dare (1968), and Jack Higgins' The Eagle Has Landed (1975). Patrick O'Brian's nautical historical novels feature the Aubrey–Maturin series set in the Royal Navy, the first being Master and Commander (1969).

Ronald Welch's Carnegie Medal winning novel Knight Crusader is set in the 12th century and gives a depiction of the Third Crusade, featuring the Christian leader and King of England Richard the Lionheart.

In crime fiction, the murder mysteries of Ruth Rendell and P. D. James are popular.

Nigel Tranter wrote historical novels of celebrated Scottish warriors: Robert the Bruce in The Bruce Trilogy, and William Wallace in The Wallace (1975).

==== Science fiction ====
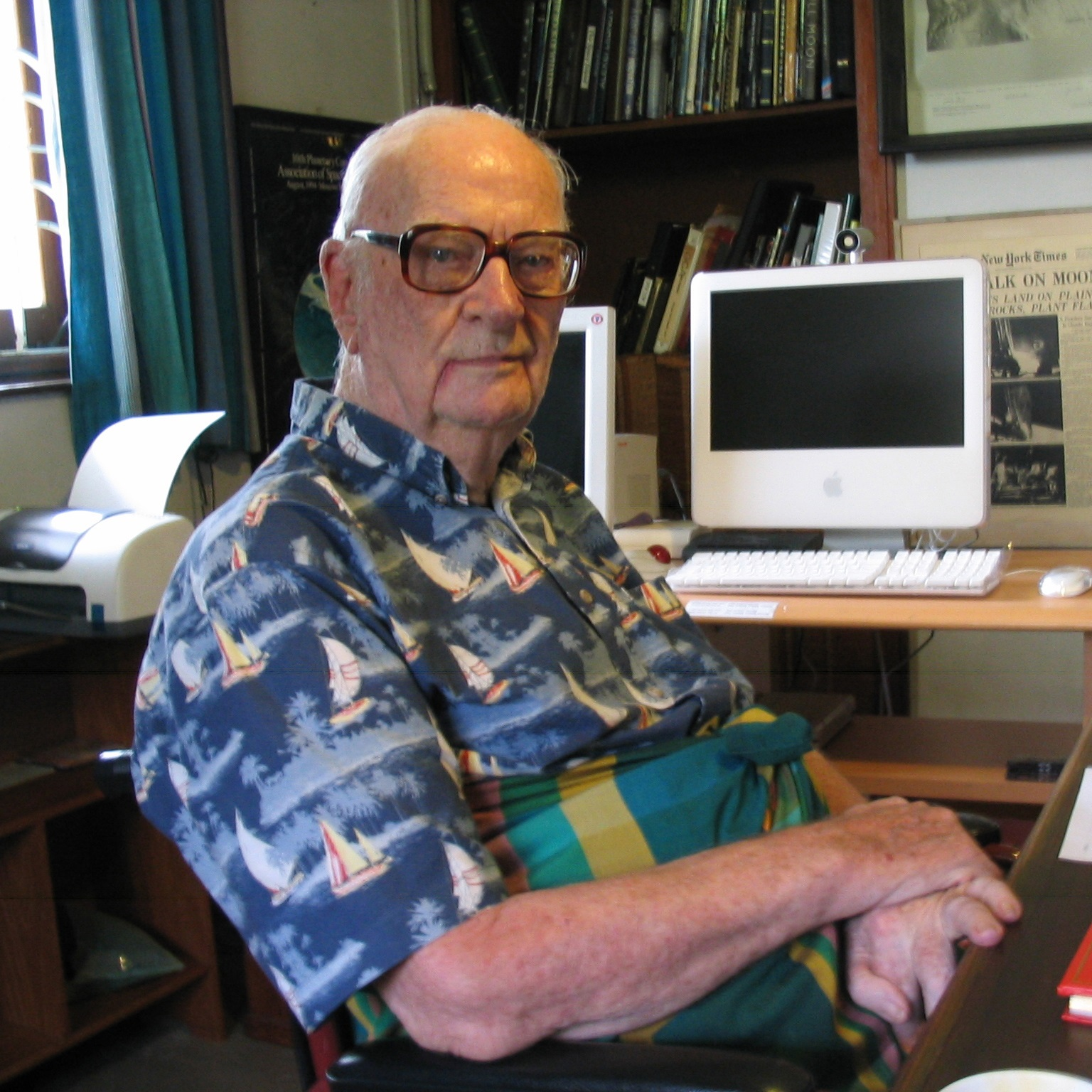
Arthur C. Clarke

John Wyndham wrote post-apocalyptic science fiction, his most notable works being The Day of the Triffids (1951), and The Midwich Cuckoos (1957). George Langelaan's The Fly (1957), is a science fiction short story. Science fiction novelist Arthur C. Clarke's 2001: A Space Odyssey (1968) is based on his various short stories, particularly The Sentinel (1951). His other major novels include Rendezvous with Rama (1972), and The Fountains of Paradise (1979). Brian Aldiss is Clarke's contemporary.

Michael Moorcock (born 1939) is a writer, primarily of science fiction and fantasy, who has also published a number of literary novels. He was involved with the 'New Wave' of science fiction writers "part of whose aim was to invest the genre with literary merit" Similarly J. G. Ballard (born 1930) "became known in the 1960s as the most prominent of the 'New Wave' science fiction writers". A later major figure in science fiction was Iain M. Banks who created a fictional anarchist, socialist, and utopian society named "The Culture". The novels that feature in it include Excession (1996), and Inversions (1998). He also published mainstream novels, including the highly controversial The Wasp Factory in 1984. Nobel prize winner Doris Lessing also published a sequence of five science fiction novels the Canopus in Argos: Archives between 1979 and 1983.

==== Fantasy ====
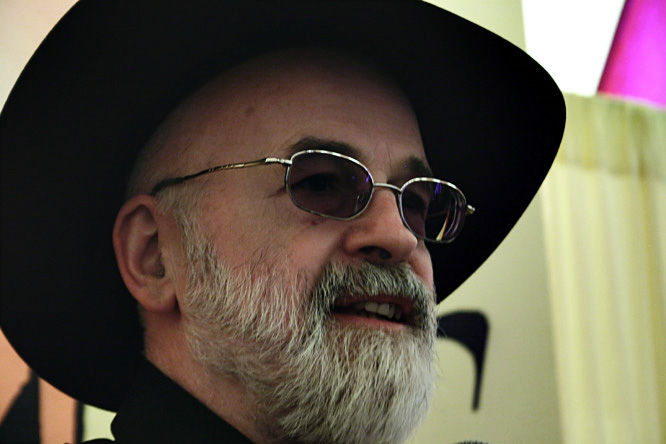
Terry Pratchett

Terry Pratchett is best known for his Discworld series of comic fantasy novels, that begins with The Colour of Magic (1983), and includes Mort (1987), Hogfather (1996), and Night Watch (2002). Pratchett's other most notable work is the 1990 novel Good Omens.

Philip Pullman's fantasy trilogy His Dark Materials comprises Northern Lights (1995), The Subtle Knife (1997), and The Amber Spyglass (2000). It follows the coming-of-age of two children as they wander through a series of parallel universes against a backdrop of epic events.

Neil Gaiman is a writer of science fiction, fantasy short stories and novels, whose notable works include Stardust (1998), Coraline (2002), The Graveyard Book (2009), and The Sandman series.

Alan Moore's works include Watchmen, V for Vendetta set in a dystopian future UK, The League of Extraordinary Gentlemen, and From Hell, speculating on the identity and motives of Jack the Ripper.

Douglas Adams wrote the five-volume science fiction comedy trilogy The Hitchhiker's Guide to the Galaxy, and also wrote the humorous fantasy detective novel Dirk Gently's Holistic Detective Agency.

==== Horror ====
Clive Barker horror novels include The Hellbound Heart.

== The Reading List ==
The "Reading list", compiled by the Reference and User Services Association of the American Library Association is an annual list of the best genre books for the adult reader. Eight genres are awarded: adrenaline titles (suspense, thrillers, and action adventure), fantasy, historical fiction, horror, mystery, romance, science fiction, and relationship fiction.

== Age categories ==
Most genres of fiction may also be segmented by the age of the intended reader:

- Children's fiction
- Middle grade fiction
- Young adult fiction
- New adult fiction
- Adult fiction

== See also ==
- Literary fiction, the type of fiction genre fiction is not
- Speculative fiction
- Stock character
- Thriller (genre)
