= DCSG =

DCSG may refer to:

- Dulwich College Singapore, a prestigious British private school in Singapore
- Dame Commander of Saint Gregory, female variant of a class in one of the orders of knighthood of the Holy See
- the Data Centre Specialist Group, a Specialist Group (SG) of the British Computer Society (BCS)
- Texas Instruments SN76489, DCSG (Digital Complex Sound Generator) sound chip by Texas Instruments
- Disaggregated Cell Site Gateway, a project within the Telecom Infra Project (TIP)
