= Grand cycle =

A Grand cycle may refer to:

- On the Solar Hijri calendar, a period of 128 or 132 years, including multiple cycles.
- Iain M. Banks's 2000 novel Look to Windward uses Grand cycle as a term for what is more commonly known as a Galactic year.
- In baseball, when someone hits for the cycle and the home run is a grand slam.
