= Peter Kenny =

British actor and singer

Peter Kenny is a voice-over artist, actor, singer and designer living in South West London. Raised on Merseyside he gained a BA(Hons) in Drama from the University of Hull.

== Career ==
=== Early career ===
Initially Peter worked for Edinburgh District Council, at the now defunct Nelson Halls, building, amongst other things, trick props and Cinderella's Coach for the King's Theatre Pantomimes. He then went on to work for the Royal Lyceum Theatre at their Roseburn Studios. After four years working as a freelance, including projects for Perth Rep, Scottish Theatre Company, Scottish Heritage and The City Gallery; he moved to London and took up his career as a performer.

=== Puppetry ===
His first engagement as a performer was with Playboard Puppets in the stage version of the popular children's Television Show, Button Moon. Roles included: Queen Wibbly, Ragdoll, Fairy Fungus, and Little Bottle. He subsequently remained with the company on a freelance basis as a puppet maker and operator, including ad campaigns for Robertsons Fruit Drinks, McDonald's, and the pilot episode of Spooks of Bottle Bay.

=== Acting ===
In theatre he has worked for a wide range of companies including: The Royal Shakespeare Company, as Ferdy the male soprano in Peter Gill's production of John Osborne's A Patriot For Me. He appeared as the lead role of Henry in the award-winning short film The Take-Out Directed by Jamie Thraves. As a member of Greg Thompson's A&BC Theatre Co. He toured the world in their iconic production of Shakespeare's The Tempest and created the role of Pilate in Greg's play, If I Were Lifted Up From Earth. In 2006 he composed the music for A&BC's production of Shaw's Saint Joan at the Fischer Center in New York, in which he also played La Hire and The English Soldier. As part of the RSC's "Complete Works" season at Stratford upon Avon, Peter played Thomas Cromwell and was the "ethereal soprano" (Michael Billington, The Guardian) singing from the darkened nave in Greg Thompson's production of Henry VIII.

From 1993 to 1994 he was a member of the BBC Radio Drama Company which he describes as, "...the best vocal training I ever had!" where he worked alongside some of the greatest names in the British Entertainment industry. He has subsequently worked as a freelance performer in a whole host of productions on UK national radio.

He was an active member of the Staging the Court Project, which endeavoured to bring academic study and theatrical practice together to recreate a performance of a play in the Great Hall at Hampton Court as it may have been performed before Henry VII.

In 2011 he joined the Tell Theatre Company and has performed in their first two productions Marriage by Gogol and A Respectable Wedding by Bertolt Brecht.

=== Audio books ===
Following a chance meeting on a tube with Matthew Walters, a producer he had worked with at the BBC, Peter started recording unabridged audio books as a reader for the charity Listening Books. Titles included: Junk by Melvin Burgess, Face and Refugee Boy by Benjamin Zephaniah, Consider Phlebas, Look To Windward, Player of Games, Surface Detail, The Wasp Factory, and Transition by Iain M. Banks.

He subsequently recorded The Wasp Factory as a commercial recording twelve years later for Iain Banks' publishers Hachette and Little Brown, and was generously reviewed by Sue Arnold in The Guardian. In 1998 he was invited to record books for the RNIB and has since recorded a large range of titles including: Kidnapped by Robert Louis Stevenson, Revolution Day by Rageh Omaar, One Good Turn by Kate Atkinson and At My Mothers Knee by Paul O'Grady.

Kenny is now an established audiobook reader with over fifty titles recorded. He regularly records the Library editions of Mandasue Heller's dark northern thrillers for ISIS Publishing, and the abridged and unabridged recordings of Iain M. Banks' space operas about The Culture. He has recorded W. J. Burley's crime novel, Wycliffe and the House of Fear for Orion Publishing, Medicus and the Disappearing Dancing Girls by R. S. Downie, The Prestige by Christopher Priest, Mother's Milk by Edward St Aubyn and Young Wives' Tales by Adele Parks. Kenny has also recorded the Audiobook version of "The Witcher" books by Andrzej Sapkowski, which have seen increased popularity after the adaptations to video games and a Netflix show.

The table below chronicles Kenny's audiobooks. It is incomplete.

Release date	Title	Author
Mar 2007	The Steep Approach to Garbadale	Iain Banks
May 2007	Young Wives' Tales	Adele Parks
Mar 2008	The Wasp Factory	Iain Banks
Apr 2008	The Prestige	Christopher Priest
Sep 2009	Transition	Iain M. Banks
2010	Surface Detail	Iain M. Banks
2011	Consider Phlebas	Iain M. Banks
2011	The Player of Games	Iain M. Banks
2012	Use of Weapons	Iain M. Banks
2012	The Hundred-Year-Old Man Who Climbed Out the Window and Disappeared	Jonas Jonasson
2012	The Hydrogen Sonata	Iain M. Banks
2013	Excession	Iain M. Banks
2013	Inversions	Iain M. Banks
2013	Use of Weapons	Iain M. Banks
2013	The Crow Road	Iain Banks
2014	The First Fifteen Lives of Harry August	Claire North
2014	Blood of Elves	Andrzej Sapkowski
2014	The Last Wish	Andrzej Sapkowski
2014	Baptism of Fire	Andrzej Sapkowski
2014	Time of Contempt	Andrzej Sapkowski
2014	The Girl Who Saved the King of Sweden	Jonas Jonasson
2014	Look to Windward	Iain M. Banks
2014	The State of the Art	Iain M. Banks
2015	Sword of Destiny	Andrzej Sapkowski
2016	The Swallows Tower	Andrzej Sapkowski
2016	Hitman Anders and the Meaning of It All	Jonas Jonasson
2017	Lady of the Lake	Andrzej Sapkowski
2017	Puck of Pook's Hill	Rudyard Kipling
2018	Season of Storms	Andrzej Sapkowski
2018	84K	Claire North
2019	The Pursuit of William Abbey	Claire North
2020	The Tower of Fools	Andrzej Sapkowski

=== Video games ===
Kenny has lent his voice to a few video games.

Release date	Title	Role
1996	Broken Sword: The Shadow of the Templars	No specific role
2014	Divinity: Original Sin	No specific role
2014	Pillars of Eternity II: Deadfire	Elias Zelen / Furrante / Shrimp (voice)

=== Corporate voice work ===
Kenny has voiced an extensive set of training videos for Romonet Software Suite, the flagship product from Romonet.

=== Singing ===
As a singer he has frequently been cast in roles such as Ferdy, Feste and Balthasar. He was a member of the early music group Passamezzo, with whom he recorded four CDs.
