= Elevenstring =

Elevenstring may refer to:

- The eleven-string alto guitar
- A fictional musical instrument in The Hydrogen Sonata by Iain M. Banks
