= Phlebas =

Phlebas may refer to:

- Phlebas the Phoenician, a character from T. S. Eliot’s poem The Waste Land, part IV and Dans le Restaurant.
- Consider Phlebas, a novel by Iain M. Banks, named after Eliot’s poem
