= Kate Craig-Wood =

British entrepreneur and transgender activist (born 1977)

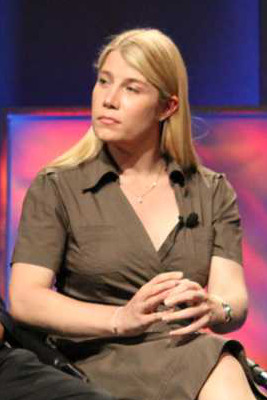
- Craig-Wood in 2010
- Born: 1 February 1977; Surrey, England
- Died: 22 September 2020 (aged 43)
- Education: University of Southampton
- Occupation: IT entrepreneur
- Known for: IT entrepreneurship and advocacy of green IT, women in IT, and acceptance of trans people
- Website: kate.craig-wood.com

Kate Helen Craig-Wood (1 February 1977 – 22 September 2020) was a British IT entrepreneur and the co-founder and managing director of Memset Dedicated Hosting. She received a number of awards for her work in business. Craig-Wood was a trans woman, and was known for promoting green IT, women in IT, and acceptance of trans people.

== Biography ==
Craig-Wood was born on 1 February 1977 in Surrey, England. She was educated at the Royal Grammar School and attended the University of Southampton, obtaining a 2:1 in Biomedical Sciences and a master's degree in the same field. Craig-Wood taught herself various programming languages and internet technologies, and after completing her master's, joined Arthur Andersen as an IT consultant. She later became head of business development for Easyspace Ltd., one of the UK's largest web hosting companies.

Craig-Wood married in 2000 and divorced in 2006. The divorce was a result of her beginning her transition, which she undertook between October 2005 and November 2006.

In 2002, Craig-Wood left Easyspace and founded Memset with her brother, Nick. Memset grew rapidly from its inception and was described as Britain's first carbon neutral ISP. Memset was voted best UK Web host six years running (2006–2011) and won a number of other awards for innovation, environmental awareness and IT strategy.

In March 2008, she came out in The Sunday Times Magazine, in the hope that she might be the role model to younger trans women that she never had, and also to try and dispel some myths about [transgender people]. She was an executive committee member and trustee of the Gender Identity Research and Education Society, and worked with the group with a focus on improving medical care in the UK for young trans people.

Craig-Wood was a proponent of energy-efficient computing and was a UK finalist in the 2008 BlackBerry Women and Technology awards for "best use of technology by a woman in a small to medium business". She was a director of Intellect UK, the UK's high-tech trade association, and chaired its climate change group. She was also involved with the British Computer Society's efforts on green IT via her committee membership of the Data Centre Specialist Group.

Kate resigned as a Director of Memset in August 2018, and relinquished her share of financial control, under the name Kate Helen Bishopwood, on 12 March 2020, when the company was sold to iomart.

Craig-Wood died on 22 September 2020, at the age of 43, of a suspected drug overdose.
