= Culture series =

1987–2012 series of ten books by Iain Banks

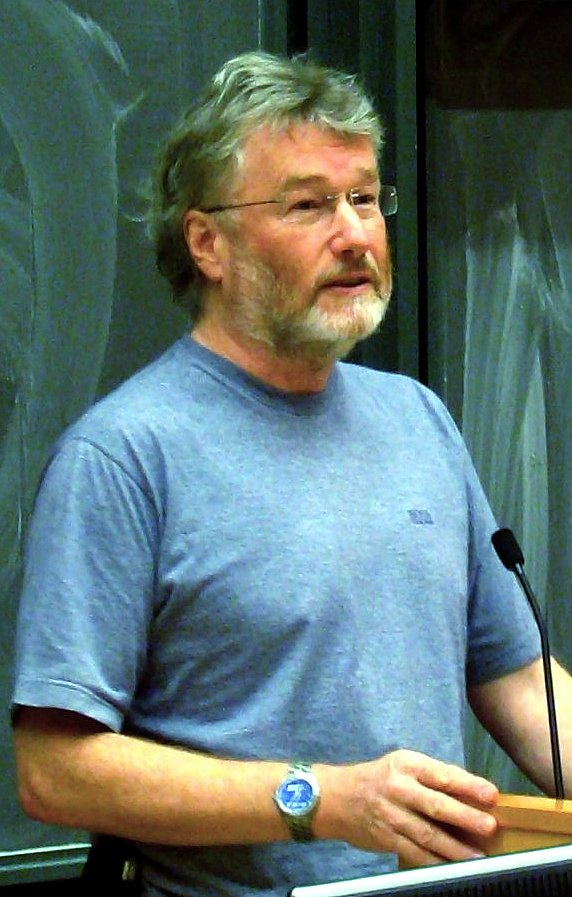
- Iain M. Banks in 2008
- Consider Phlebas (1987); The Player of Games (1988); Use of Weapons (1990); The State of the Art (1991); Excession (1996); Inversions (1998); Look to Windward (2000); Matter (2008); Surface Detail (2010); The Hydrogen Sonata (2012)
- Author: Iain M. Banks
- Country: United Kingdom
- Language: English
- Genre: Science Fiction
- Publisher: Orbit Books
- Published: 1987 – 2012
- Media type: Print / Digital
- No. of books: 10
- Website: https://www.iain-banks.net

The Culture series is a science fiction series written by Scottish author Iain M. Banks and released from 1987 until 2012. The stories centre on The Culture, a utopian, post-scarcity space society of humanoid aliens and advanced superintelligent artificial intelligences living in artificial habitats spread across the Milky Way galaxy. The main themes of the series are the dilemmas that an idealistic, more-advanced civilization faces in dealing with smaller, less-advanced civilizations that do not share its ideals, and whose behaviour it sometimes finds barbaric. In some of the stories, action takes place mainly in non-Culture environments, and the leading characters are often on the fringes of (or non-members of) the Culture, sometimes acting as agents of the Culture (knowing and unknowing) in its plans to civilize the galaxy. Each novel is a self-contained story with new characters, although reference is occasionally made to the events of previous novels.

== The Culture ==
The Culture is a society formed by various humanoid species and artificial intelligences about 9,000 years before the events of novels in the series. Since the majority of its biological population can have almost anything they want without the need to work, there is little need for laws or enforcement, and the culture is described by Banks as space socialism. It features a post-scarcity economy (Note: Banks: "It is my vision of what you do when you are in that post-scarcity society, you can completely indulge myself. The Culture has no unemployment problem, no one has to work, so all work is a form of play!" (Parsons 2010)) where technology is advanced to such a degree that all production is automated. Its members live mainly in spaceships and other off-planet constructs, because its founders wished to avoid the centralised political and corporate power-structures that planet-based economies foster. Most of the planning and administration is done by Minds, very advanced AIs.

Although the Culture has more advanced technology and a more powerful economy than the vast majority of known civilizations, it is only one of the "Involved" civilizations that take an active part in galactic affairs. The much older Homomda are slightly more advanced at the time of Consider Phlebas. The Morthanveld have a much larger population and economy, but are hampered by a more restrictive attitude to the role of AI in their society. The capabilities of all such societies are vastly exceeded by those of the Elder civilisations (semi-retired from Galactic politics but who remain supremely potent) and even more so by those of the Sublimed, entities which have abandoned their material form for existence in the form of a non-corporeal, multi-dimensional energy being. The Sublimed generally refrain from intervention in the material world.

Some other civilizations hold less favourable views of the Culture. At the time of their war with the Culture, the Idirans and some of their allies regarded the control that the Minds exercised over the Culture as a form of idolatry. The Homomda regard the Culture as idealistic and hyper-active. Some members of the Culture have seceded to form related civilizations, known collectively as the Ulterior. These include the Peace Faction, the AhForgetIt Tendency and the Zetetic Elench. Others simply drop out temporarily or permanently.

== Books in the series ==
The Culture series comprises nine novels, one novella, and two short stories ordered by publication date:

Title	First published	Date of setting	ISBN
Consider Phlebas	April 1987	1331 CE (Note: Early in the book it is stated that the war has been going on for four years, while the historical appendix states that the war began in 1327 CE. (Banks 1987, p. 467, A Short History of the Idiran War); the book ends with a historical account of the war dated to 2110)	1-85723-138-4
An episode in a full-scale war between the Culture and the Idirans, told mainly from the point of view of an operative of the Idiran Empire.
A Gift from the Culture	June 1987	?	
A man in self-imposed exile from the Culture is pressured into committing an act of terrorism with the help of Culture technology. A short story first published in Interzone #20 in 1987, later collected in Banks's 1991 short story collection The State of the Art.
Descendant	August 1987	?	1-85286-004-9
A soldier and his sapient spacesuit struggle to survive after being shot down and crash-landing on a barren planet. A short story first published in the anthology Tales from the Forbidden Planet, edited by Roz Kaveney, later collected in Banks's 1991 short story collection The State of the Art.
The Player of Games	1988	c. 2083 to 2087/88 CE (Note: The ship Limiting Factor was "constructed seven hundred and sixteen years earlier in the closing stages of the Idiran war, when the conflict in space was almost over".(Banks 1988) The war in space ended in 1367. The events of the book take place over a period of four to five years from the time of this statement.)	1-85723-146-5
A bored member of the Culture is blackmailed into being the Culture's agent in a plan to subvert a brutal, hierarchical empire. His mission is to win an empire-wide tournament by which the ruler of the empire is selected.
The State of the Art	1989	1977 CE	0-929480-06-6
A Culture group investigate Earth in the 1970s, considering it for contact. A novella first published on its own, later collected in Banks's 1991 short story collection named after it.
Use of Weapons	1990	2092 CE (Note: the events of the book are almost simultaneous with Diziet Sma's writing an account of her visit to Earth in 1977. In her preface to this account in "The State of the Art", she dates the visit to 115 years earlier.) main narrative. 1892 CE (Note: At the end of the main narrative stream, Zakalwe says it has been two centuries since the battleship was taken.) start of secondary narrative.	0-356-19160-5
Chapters describing the current mission of a Culture special agent born and raised on a non-Culture planet alternate with chapters that describe in reverse chronological order earlier missions and the traumatic events that made him who he is.
Excession	1996	c. 1867 CE (Note: The Gray Area reflects, "Nothing like this had been seen in the galaxy since the worst days of the Idiran war five hundred years earlier, and even then not remotely on such a scale." (Banks 1996, p. 463)) main setting. c. 1827 CE (Note: Dated by Dajeil's "forty-year pregnancy". (Banks 1996, p. 9)) and c. 633 BCE (Note: "two and a half thousand years ago… the Problem Child…chanced upon the ember of a very old star" where it found "A perfect black-body sphere fifty klicks across, in orbit around the unfeasibly ancient star." (Banks 1996, pp. 70–73)) flashbacks.	1-85723-394-8
An alien artifact far advanced beyond the Culture's understanding is used by one group of Minds to lure a civilisation (the behaviour of which they disapprove) into war; another group of Minds works against the conspiracy. A sub-plot covers how two humanoids make up their differences after traumatic events that happened 40 years earlier.
Inversions	1998	Unspecified	1-85723-763-3
Not explicitly a Culture novel, but recounts what appear to be the activities of a Special Circumstances agent and a Culture emigrant on a planet whose development is roughly equivalent to that of medieval Europe. The interwoven stories are told from the viewpoint of several of the locals.
Look to Windward	2000	c. 2167 CE (Note: "The war had ended nearly eight hundred years ago and life had gone on." (Banks 2000, p. 29))	1-85723-969-5
The Culture has interfered in the development of a race known as the Chelgrians, with disastrous consequences. Now, in the light of a star that was destroyed 800 years previously during the Idiran War, plans for revenge are being hatched.
Matter	2008	c. 1887 or 2167 CE (Note: The book refers to the Sleeper Service incident in Excession as occurring 20 years previously; however, it also says that the Liveware Problem has been wandering for 800 years, having begun at the end of its service in the Idiran War.)	1-84149-417-8
A Culture special agent who is a princess of an early-industrial society on a huge artificial planet learns that her father and brother have been killed and decides to return to her homeworld. When she returns, she finds a far deeper threat.
Surface Detail	2010	sometime between 2767 (Note: The book states that the events of Look to Windward occurred about 600 years earlier ("However, as part of what were in effect war reparations after the Chel debacle, six hundred years ago..."), and repeatedly refers to the Idiran war as occurring about 1500 years earlier; the war formally ended in 1375.) and c. 2967 CE (Note: Banks in an interview stated, "This one takes place about eight hundred years later on in the chronology of the culture"; at the time he was speaking the latest book in the culture chronology was set around 2167 (Parsons 2010))	1-84149-893-9
A young woman seeks revenge on her murderer after being brought back to life by Culture technology. Meanwhile, a war over the digitized souls of the dead is expanding from cyberspace into the real world.
The Hydrogen Sonata	2012	c. 2375 CE (Note: The book states that the Interesting Times Gang from Excession has not been seen in almost 500 years; also, that it is about 1000 years after the Idiran war.)	978-0356501505
In the last days of the Gzilt civilisation, which is about to Sublime, a secret from far back in their history threatens to unravel their plans. Aided by a number of Culture vessels and their avatars, one of the Gzilt tries to discover if much of their history was actually a lie.

== Main themes ==
Since the Culture's biological population commonly live as long as 400 years and have no need to work, they face the difficulty of giving meaning to their lives when the Minds and other intelligent machines can do almost anything better than the biological population can. Many try—few successfully—to join Contact, the Culture's combined diplomatic / military / government service, and fewer still are invited to the elite Special Circumstances (SC), Contact's secret service and special operations division. Normal Culture citizens vicariously derive meaning from their existence via the works of Contact and SC. Banks described the Culture as "some incredibly rich lady of leisure who does good, charitable works... Contact does that on a large scale." The same need to find a purpose for existence contributed to the majority of the Culture embarking semi-voluntarily on its only recent full-scale war, to stop the expansion of the militaristic and expansionist Idirans—otherwise the Culture's economic and technological advancement would only have been an exercise in hedonism.

All of the stories feature the tension between the Culture's humane, anarcho-communist ideals and its need to intervene in the affairs of less enlightened and often less advanced civilisations.The first Culture novel, Consider Phlebas, describes an episode in the Idiran War, which the Culture's Minds foresaw would cause billions of deaths on both sides, but which their utilitarian calculations predicted would be the best course in the long term. The Idiran War serves as a recurring reference point in most of the subsequent novels, influencing the Culture's development for centuries and dividing its residents—both humanoids and AI Minds—along the pacifist and interventionist ideals.

In subsequent novels, the Culture—particularly SC and, to a lesser degree, Contact—continue to employ subterfuge, espionage, and even direct action (collectively called "dirty tricks") in order to protect itself and spread the Culture's "good works" and ideals. These dirty tricks include blackmailing persons, employing mercenaries, recruiting double agents, attempting to effect regime change, and even engaging in false flag operations against the Culture itself (potentially resulting in the death of billions). Though each of these individual actions would horrify the average Culture citizen, the Culture's Minds tend to justify these actions in terms of lives saved in the long-term, perhaps over the course of several hundred years. The Culture is willing to use not only preemptive, but also retaliatory, actions in order to deter future hostile actions against itself. Banks commented that in order to prevent atrocities, "even the Culture throws away its usual moral rule-book." Andrew M. Butler noted that, "Having established the peaceful, utopian, game-playing tendencies of the Culture, ... in later volumes the Culture’s dirty tricks are more exposed."

The Culture stories have been described as "eerily prescient". Consider Phlebas explicitly presents a clash of civilizations, although this phrase was used by Samuel P. Huntington and earlier authors. This is highlighted by the novel's description of the Idirans' expansion as a "jihad" and by its epigraphic verse from the Koran, "Idolatry is worse than carnage". (Note: "Idolatry is worse than carnage" is presented as a translation of "The Koran, 2: 190"; but is actually a misplaced reference to Quran 2:191, even then, modern scholars regard it as inaccurate, since the word translated as "idolatry" actually means "discord" or "oppression" or "persecution" (Duggan 2007)) However, it was as much a "holy war" from the Culture's point of view. Throughout the series, Contact and Special Circumstances show themselves willing to intervene, sometimes forcefully, in other civilizations to make them more Culture-like.

Much of Look to Windward is a commentary on the Idiran-Culture war, from a viewpoint 800 years later, mainly reflecting grief over both personal and large-scale losses and guilt over actions taken in the war. It combines these with similar reflections on the catastrophic miscarriage of the Culture's attempt to dissolve the Chelgrians' oppressive caste system. In neither case, however, does distress over the consequences of Culture policy lead its representatives to reject that policy. The book illustrates the limitations of power, and also points out that Minds and other AIs are as vulnerable as biological persons to grief, guilt and regrets.

== Place within science fiction ==
According to critic Farah Mendelson, the Culture stories are space opera, with certain elements that are free from scientific realism, and Banks uses this freedom extravagantly in order to focus on the human and political aspects of his universe; he rejects the dystopian direction of present-day capitalism, which both cyberpunk and earlier space operas assume, in creating a post-scarcity society as the primary civilization of focus. Space opera had peaked in the 1930s, but started to decline as magazine editors such as John W. Campbell demanded more realistic approaches. By the 1960s many space operas were satires on earlier styles, such as Harry Harrison's Stainless Steel Rat and Bill, the Galactic Hero stories, while televised and film space operas such as Star Trek and Star Wars were thought to have dumbed down the subgenre. The Culture stories did much to revive space opera.

== Literary techniques ==
Banks has been described as "an incorrigible player of games" with both style and structure – and with the reader. In both the Culture stories and his work outside science fiction, there are two sides to Banks, the "merry chatterer" who brings scenes to life and "the altogether less amiable character" who "engineers the often savage structure of his stories". Banks uses a wide range of styles. The Player of Games opens in a leisurely manner as it presents the main character's sense of boredom and inertia, and adopts for the main storyline a "spare, functional" style that contrasts with the "linguistic fireworks" of later stories. Sometimes the styles used in Excession relate to the function and focal character of the scene: slow-paced and detailed for Dajeil, who is still mourning over traumatic events that happened decades earlier; a parody of huntin', shootin', and fishin' country gentlemen, sometimes reminiscent of P. G. Wodehouse, when describing the viewpoint of the Affront; the ship Serious Callers Only, afraid of becoming involved in the conflict between factions of Minds, speaks in cryptic verse, while the Sleeper Service, acting as a freelance detective, adopts a hardboiled style. On the other hand, Banks often wrong-foots readers by using prosaic descriptions for the grandest scenery, self-deprecation and humour for the most heroic actions, and a poetic style in describing one of the Affront's killings.

He delights in building up expectations and then surprising the reader. Even in The Player of Games, which has the simplest style and structure of the series, the last line of the epilogue reveals who was really pulling the strings all along. In all the Culture stories, Banks subverts many clichés of space opera. The Minds are not plotting to take over the universe, and no-one is following a grand plan. The darkly comic double-act of Ferbin and Holse in Matter is not something most writers would place in "the normally po-faced context of space opera". Even the names of Culture spaceships are jokes – for example Lightly Seared on the Reality Grill, Experiencing a Significant Gravitas Shortfall (part of a running gag in the series) and Liveware Problem (see liveware).

Banks often uses "outsiders" as viewpoint characters, and said that using an enemy of the Culture as the main character of Consider Phlebas, the first story in the series, enabled him to present a more rounded view of the Culture. However, this character realises that his attempts to plan for anything that might conceivably happen on a mission are very similar to the way in which the Culture makes all its decisions, and by the end suspects he has chosen the wrong side.

The focal character of The Player of Games is bored with the lack of real challenges in his life, is blackmailed into becoming a Culture agent, admires the vibrancy of the Azad Empire but is then disgusted by its brutality, and plays the final of the tournament in a style that reflects the Culture's values.

Use of Weapons features a non-Culture mercenary who accepts the benefits of association with the Culture, including immortality as the fee for his first assignment, and completes several dangerous missions as a Culture agent, but complains that he is kept in the dark about the aims of his missions and that in some of the wars he has fought maybe the Culture was backing both sides, with good reason.

Look to Windward uses three commentators on the Culture, a near-immortal Behemothaur, a member of the race plunged into civil war by a Culture intervention that went wrong, and the ambassador of a race at similar technological level to the Culture's.

The action scenes of the Culture stories are comparable to those of blockbuster films. In an interview, Banks said he would like Consider Phlebas to be filmed "with a very, very, very big budget indeed" and would not mind if the story were given a happy ending, provided the biggest action scenes were kept. On the other hand, The Player of Games relies mainly on the psychological tension of the games by which the ruler of the Azad Empire is selected.

Banks is unspecific about many of the background details in the stories, such as the rules of the game that is the centrepiece of The Player of Games, and cheerfully makes no attempt at scientific credibility. (Note: "I know it's all nonsense, but you've got to admit it's impressive nonsense." (Banks 1994))

== Genesis of the series ==
Banks says he conceived the Culture in the 1960s, and that it is a combination of wish fulfilment and a reaction against the predominantly right-wing science fiction produced in the United States. In his opinion, the Culture might be a "great place to live", with no exploitation of people or AIs, and whose people could create beings greater than themselves.

Before his first published novel, The Wasp Factory (1984; not science fiction), was accepted in 1983, Banks wrote five books that were rejected, of which three were science fiction. In Banks's first draft of Use of Weapons in 1974, his third attempt at a novel, the Culture was just a backdrop intended to show that the mercenary agent was working for the "good guys" and was responsible for his own misdeeds. At the time he persuaded his friend Ken MacLeod to read it and MacLeod tried to suggest improvements, but the book had too much purple prose and a very convoluted structure. In 1984, shortly after The Wasp Factory was published, MacLeod was asked to read Use of Weapons again, and said there was "a good novel in there struggling to get out", and suggested the interleaved forwards and backwards narratives that appeared in the published version in 1990. The novella The State of the Art, which provides the title of the 1991 collection, dates from 1979, the first draft of The Player of Games from 1980 and that of Consider Phlebas from 1982.

== Reception ==
Inversions won the 2004 Italia Science Fiction Award for the Best International Novel.

The American edition of Look to Windward was listed by the editors of SF Site as one of the "Best SF and Fantasy Books of 2001" after the UK edition had missed out by just one place the previous year.

Use of Weapons was listed in Damien Broderick's book Science Fiction: The 101 Best Novels 1985–2010.

As a posthumous tribute to Iain Banks, aerospace manufacturer SpaceX named two of its autonomous spaceport drone ships after sentient star ships Just Read the Instructions and Of Course I Still Love You which first appeared in the novel The Player of Games. A third drone craft was named A Shortfall of Gravitas, inspired by the starship Experiencing a Significant Gravitas Shortfall in Look to Windward.

A further tribute was paid by the Five Deeps Expedition which named all of its craft after Culture ships and drones.

Amazon founder Jeff Bezos is also a fan of the series. In 2018, he announced that Amazon Studios was developing a television adaptation of Consider Phlebas, calling the series a "huge personal favorite", though the project was cancelled in 2020. Speaking with John Elkann at Italian Tech Week in October 2025, Bezos again recommended the series, praising Banks's "utopian" vision of the future. He highlighted the series for offering a rare optimistic depiction of the intersection between humanity and super-intelligent artificial intelligence, contrasting it with the dystopian narratives common in science fiction.

On an episode of Lex Fridman's podcast released on 29 April 2022, the artist Grimes said that Surface Detail of the Culture series is the greatest science fiction book ever written.

== Bibliography ==
=== Primary sources ===
- Banks, Iain M. (1987). Consider Phlebas. Orbit. ISBN 1-85723-138-4.
- Kaveney, Roz (1987). Tales from the Forbidden Planet. Titan Books. ISBN 1-85286-004-9.
- Banks, Iain M. (1988). The Player of Games. Orbit. ISBN 1-85723-146-5.
- Banks, Iain M. (1989). The State of the Art. Mark V. Ziesing. ISBN 0-929480-06-6.
- Banks, Iain M. (1990). Use of Weapons. Orbit. ISBN 0-356-19160-5.
- Banks, Iain M. (1991). The State of the Art. Orbit. ISBN 0-356-19669-0.
- Banks, Iain M. (10 August 1994). "A Few Notes on the Culture". Newsgroup: rec.arts.sf.written.
- Banks, Iain M. (1996). Excession. Orbit. ISBN 1-85723-457-X.
- Banks, Iain M. (1998). Inversions. Orbit. ISBN 1-85723-763-3.
- Banks, Iain M. (2000). Look to Windward. Orbit. ISBN 1-85723-969-5.
- Banks, Iain M. (2008). Matter. Orbit. ISBN 978-1-84149-417-3.
- Banks, Iain M. (2010). Surface Detail. Orbit. ISBN 978-1-84149-893-5.
- Banks, Iain M. (2012). The Hydrogen Sonata. Orbit. ISBN 978-0356501505.

=== Secondary sources ===
- Brown, Carolyn (1996), "Utopias and Heterotopias: The 'Culture' of Iain M. Banks", in Littlewood, Derek; Stockwell, Peter (eds.), Impossibility Fiction, Rodopi, pp. 57–73, ISBN 90-420-0032-5.
- Butler, Andrew M. (2003), "Thirteen Ways of Looking at the British Boom" (PDF), Science Fiction Studies, 30 (3): 374–393, JSTOR 4241200.
- Duggan, Robert (22 December 2007), "Iain M. Banks, Postmodernism and the Gulf War", Extrapolation, 48 (3): 558–577, doi:10.3828/extr.2007.48.3.12.
- Hollinger, Veronica (1997), "Introducing Star Trek", Science Fiction Studies, 24 (2).
- Horwich, David (21 January 2002), "Culture Clash: Ambivalent Heroes and the Ambiguous Utopia in the Work of Iain M. Banks", Strange Horizons.
- Jackson, Patrick Thaddeus; Heilman, James (2008), "Outside Context Problems: Liberalism and the Other in the Work of Iain M.Banks", in Hassler, D.M.; Wilcox, C. (eds.), New Boundaries in Political Science Fiction, University of South Carolina Press, pp. 235–258, ISBN 978-1-57003-736-8.
- Mendelsohn, Farah (2005), "Iain M.Banks: Excession", in Seed, David (ed.), A Companion to Science Fiction, Blackwell Publishing, pp. 556–566, ISBN 0470797010.
- Palmer, Christopher (1999), "Galactic Empires and the Contemporary Extravaganza: Dan Simmons and Iain M. Banks", Science Fiction Studies, 26 (1).
- Stockwell, Stephen (2009). Utopia and Apocalypse: Political Philosophy and American TV Series. APSA Conference. hdl:10072/31808.
- Vint, Sherryl (2007), Bodies of Tomorrow, University of Toronto Press, ISBN 978-0-8020-9052-2.
- Westfahl, Gary (2003), "Space Opera", in James, Edward; Mendelsohn, Farah (eds.), The Cambridge Companion to Science Fiction, Cambridge University Press, pp. 197–208, ISBN 0-521-01657-6.

=== Interviews and reviews ===
- Allberry, Russ (18 November 2005), "Review: The Player of Games by Iain M. Banks", Eyrie.
- Baker, Neal (2003), "Review of Dark Light", in Butler, Andrew M.; Mendelsohn, Farah (eds.), The True Knowledge of Ken MacLeod, Reading, UK: Science Fiction Foundation, pp. 95–97, ISBN 978-0903007023.
- Gevers, Nick (2000), Look To Windward (review), archived from the original on 10 December 2000.
- Gevers, Nick (2002), "Cultured futurist Iain M. Banks creates an ornate utopia", SciFi.com, archived from the original on 2 October 2008.
- Holt, Tom (November 2007), "The Player of Games (review)" (PDF), SFX Magazine: 114, archived from the original (PDF) on 10 October 2008.
- Horton, Richard (5 March 1997), Use of Weapons: Review, archived from the original on 28 January 2017.
- "Iain M Banks (interview)", The Guardian, 11 September 2000
- "Interview with Iain M. Banks", SFF World, 1 June 1997, archived from the original on 15 July 2009
- Johnson, Greg L. (2008), "Matter (review)", SF Site, archived from the original on 4 June 2008.
- Johnson, Greg L. (1998), "Excession (review)", SF Site, archived from the original on 28 April 1999.
- Langford, David (1998), "Iain M. Banks: Inversions", Ansible.uk.
- Lowe, Greg (24 March 2008), "Iain Banks – Interview", Spike Magazine.
- Mitchell, Chris (3 September 1996), "Iain Banks: Whit and Excession: Getting Used To Being God", Spike Magazine.
- Parsons, Michael (14 October 2010), "Interview: Iain M Banks talks 'Surface Detail' with Wired", Wired.
- Poole, Steven (9 February 2008), "Culture Clashes: Review of Matter by Iain M. Banks", The Guardian.
- "Science Fiction: The 101 Best Novels 1985-2010", Nonstop Press, 5 May 2012, archived from the original on 26 April 2013.
- A Quick Chat With Iain M. Banks, The Richmond Review, 1996, archived from the original on 12 May 2008.
- Shoul, Simeon (1 August 2001), Look to Windward by Iain M. Banks (review).
- Silver, Steven H. (22 March 2004), SF Site: News, archived from the original on 17 May 2008.
- Sleight, Graham (28 March 2008), Locus Magazine's Graham Sleight reviews Iain M. Banks, Locus Magazine
- Walsh, Neil (2002), "Best SF and Fantasy Books of 2001: Editors' Choice", SF Site, archived from the original on 14 August 2002.
- Wilson, Andrew (1994), "Iain Banks Interview", Textualities.

=== News sources ===
- Ajami, Fouad; Cohen, Eliot A.; Huntington, Samuel P. (14 January 2009), "Samuel P. Huntington, 1927–2008", American Enterprise Institute for Public Policy Research, archived from the original on 18 April 2009
- Arevalo, Evelyn (9 July 2021), "Elon Musk Shows Off New SpaceX Falcon 9 Autonomous Droneship -'A Shortfall Of Gravitas'", Tesmanian.
- Cofield, Calla (9 April 2016), "SpaceX Sticks a Rocket Landing at Sea in Historic First", Scientific American.
