= Surface Detail =

2010 science fiction novel by Iain M. Banks

- First edition
- Author: Iain M. Banks
- Audio read by: Peter Kenny
- Language: English
- Series: Culture
- Genre: Science fiction novel
- Publisher: Orbit
- Publication date: 7 October 2010
- Publication place: Scotland
- Media type: Print (Hardback)
- Pages: 604 (Hardcover)
- ISBN: 978-0-316-12340-2
- Preceded by: Matter
- Followed by: The Hydrogen Sonata

Surface Detail by Iain M. Banks is a science fiction novel in his Culture series, first published in the UK on 7 October 2010 and the US on 28 October 2010.

== Synopsis ==
The events of Surface Detail take place around 2970 AD, according to Banks. The events occur six to eight hundred years after the "Chel Debacle", depicted in the earlier novel Look to Windward which is set seventy-eight years after the events in Use of Weapons.

Each chapter of the book covers one or more of the six main protagonists—Lededje Y'breq, a chattel slave; Joiler Veppers, an industrialist and playboy; Gyorni Vatueil, a soldier; Prin and Chay, Pavulean academics; and Yime Nsokyi, a Quietus agent. Some of the plot occurs in simulated environments. As the book begins, a war game—the "War in Heaven"—has been running for several decades. The outcome of the simulated war will determine whether societies are allowed to run artificial Hells, virtual afterlives in which the mind-states of the dead are tortured. The Culture, fiercely anti-Hell, has opted to stay out of the war while accepting the outcome as binding.

Vatueil is a soldier who has fought his way up the ranks of the war game to a position where he can determine policy. He is instrumental in the decision to cheat—first by attempting to hack into and subvert the war game, and when this fails by moving the simulated war into the real world.

Prin and Chay belong to a species that use the threat of Hell to control the behaviour of their population. While still alive, they enter the Pavulean Hell on a mission to reveal the existence and details of this Hell to the general population. Prin succeeds in getting out, but has to leave his partner Chay behind, where she is tortured, restored to some semblance of sanity, and finally given a role as an angel in Hell who is able to release one soul a day by killing them. Prin testifies to the Pavulean parliament of his experience in Hell and attempts to convince them that it should be abolished.

Veppers is the richest person in his society, the multi-planet Sichultian Enablement. Y'breq, a frequent victim of rape by Veppers, is murdered by him as she attempts to escape. She is unexpectedly reincarnated ("revented," in Culture terms) aboard a Culture ship, having been secretly implanted with a neural lace some ten years before. She immediately wants to return to her homeworld, to find and kill Veppers.

The book hinges on Veppers's involvement in the War in Heaven. He initially appears to be a minor player, but his involvement is gradually revealed to be more and more critical. The final revelation is that he has made some of his fortune by providing the hardware to run the Hells of various species; over a century he has accumulated about 70% of all the Hells. The hardware is located on his country estate on the planet Sichult. He sets up a secret deal to have the Hells destroyed in an attack which is to be blamed upon the Culture. His motivation is that such an attack will release him from his contracts to run the Hells, which would have become worthless if the anti-Hell side won, but which he cannot escape in any other way.

Y'breq travels back to Sichult on the Falling Outside The Normal Moral Constraints, an advanced and "very slightly psychotic" Culture warship. In hot pursuit is Yime Nsokyi, a Culture agent tasked with preventing Y'breq from killing Veppers. As they and their ships arrive, things come to a head.

The Culture agents conspire to arrange for the attack on the Veppers estate to successfully destroy the Hells, while simultaneously appearing to attempt to stop the attack. They also conspire to ensure that Veppers's secret deal is revealed. Veppers himself is at the estate's mansion during the attack, where Y'breq finds him for the final, personal, showdown.

The epilogue reveals Vatueil's identity as Zakalwe, using an alias that is an anagram of Livueta, the character in Use of Weapons whose forgiveness Zakalwe sought.

== Critical reception ==
Roz Kaveney of The Independent said that this was a poor book to introduce new readers to the Culture, but "far from the worst introduction to Banks's series." Alastair Mabbott of The Herald described the story as having "murder, revenge, pursuit and subterfuge taking place against a backdrop of escalating tension [that] stands up very well, and makes the prospect of further books in the Culture series somewhat less imposing." UK book review site The Bookbag remarked that "... what sets this book apart is the quality of the writing and the depth of the author's imagination."

== See also ==
- Simulated reality
