= Use of Weapons =

1990 novel by Iain M. Banks

- Early Orbit edition cover
- Author: Iain M. Banks
- Audio read by: Peter Kenny
- Language: English
- Series: The Culture
- Genre: Science fiction
- Publisher: Orbit
- Publication date: 13 September 1990
- Publication place: Scotland
- Media type: Print (Hardcover)
- Pages: 352
- ISBN: 0-356-19160-5
- OCLC: 59159282
- Preceded by: The State of the Art
- Followed by: Excession

Use of Weapons is a science fiction novel by Scottish writer Iain M. Banks, first published in 1990. It is the third novel in the Culture series.

The narrative takes the form of a biography of a man called Cheradenine Zakalwe, who was born outside of the Culture but was recruited into it by Special Circumstances agent Diziet Sma to work as an operative intervening in less advanced civilizations. The novel recounts several of these interventions and Zakalwe's attempts to come to terms with his own past.

== Plot summary ==
The book is made up of two narrative streams, interwoven in alternating chapters. The numbers of the chapters indicate which stream they belong to: one stream is numbered forward in words (One, Two ...), while the other is numbered in reverse with Roman numerals (XIII, XII ...). The story told by the former moves forward chronologically (as the numbers suggest) and tells a self-contained story, while the latter is written in a reverse chronology with each chapter successively earlier in Zakalwe's life. Further complicating this structure is a prologue and epilogue set shortly after the events of the main narrative, and many flashbacks within the chapters.

The forward-moving narrative stream deals with the attempts of Diziet Sma and a drone named Skaffen-Amtiskaw (of Special Circumstances, a division of Contact Section) to re-enlist Zakalwe for another job. He must entice Beychae, an old politician, to come out of retirement to aid the Culture's aim in preventing war in the region. The payment that Zakalwe demands is the location of a woman, named Livueta. The backward-moving narrative stream describes earlier jobs that Zakalwe has performed for the Culture, ultimately returning to his pre-Culture childhood with his two sisters (Livueta and Darckense) and a boy his age named Elethiomel whose father has been imprisoned for treason.

As the two streams of the narrative conclude, it emerges that Elethiomel and Zakalwe commanded two opposing armies in a bloody civil war. Elethiomel took Darckense hostage before finally having her killed and her bones and skin made into a chair, to be sent to Zakalwe, who attempted suicide upon receiving it.

After the conclusion of his mission, a severely wounded Zakalwe is taken back to his homeworld to see Livueta. She rejects him and reveals that the person called "Cheradenine Zakalwe" is in fact Elethiomel, who had stolen the real Zakalwe's identity after the latter killed himself during the civil war. Elethiomel suffers an aneurysm and Skaffen-Amtiskaw performs surgery in an attempt to save his life with initially unclear results.

The Prologue/Epilogue as well as the section, "States of War", ostensibly written as the opening chapter of a sequel, show how the characters continue. In the latter Sma recruits another war-torn agent for the Culture, while in the former Zakalwe is "back to his old tricks" in military action.

== History ==
According to Banks, he wrote a much longer version of the book in 1974, long before any of his books (science fiction or otherwise) were published. The book had an even more complicated structure ("It was impossible to comprehend without thinking in six dimensions") but already introduced the Culture as background for the story of Cheradenine Zakalwe. Realising that his intended structure was a "fatal flaw", not least because it demanded the story's climax appear exactly half-way through, Banks moved on to write Against a Dark Background instead. The book's cryptic acknowledgement credits friend and fellow science fiction author Ken MacLeod with the suggestion "to argue the old warrior out of retirement" (to rewrite the old book) and further credits him with suggesting "the fitness programme" (the new structure). MacLeod makes use of similar structures in his own novels, most notably in The Stone Canal.

== Reception ==
In 1990 Use of Weapons was nominated for a British Science Fiction Association Award. In 1991 it was nominated for an Arthur C. Clarke Award, and in 1993 it won the Kurd-Laßwitz-Preis for Foreign Novel. Tor.com reviewed the book favorably in 2017, describing it as "beautiful and inevitable, and the tension is unbearable... There’s so much I love about this I hardly know where to start." The Pequod rated the book a 9.5 (out of 10.0), saying, "This is first-rate science fiction, with unexpected depth as it explores the nature of morality, the effectiveness (and unintended consequences) of political intervention, and even the process of decision-making in the face of uncertainty." In 2012 it was selected for Damien Broderick's book Science Fiction: The 101 Best Novels 1985-2010.

Use of Weapons was voted the Best sci-fi film never made by the readers of The Register in 2011.

== See also ==
- Banks' Surface Detail, in which Zakalwe also appears under an alias.
- Banks' The State of the Art, in which Diziet Sma and the drone Skaffen-Amtiskaw are two of the main characters in the novella that lent its title to the story collection.

== Bibliography ==
- Use of Weapons, Iain M. Banks, London: Orbit, 1990, ISBN 0-356-19160-5, ISBN 0-7088-8358-3, ISBN 0-7088-8350-8, ISBN 1-85723-135-X (UK), ISBN 0-553-29224-2 (US)
