= Matter (novel) =

2008 novel by Iain Banks

- Author: Iain M. Banks
- Audio read by: Toby Longworth
- Language: English
- Series: The Culture
- Genre: Science fiction novel
- Publisher: Orbit
- Publication date: 25 January 2008
- Publication place: United Kingdom
- Media type: Print (Hardback & Paperback)
- Pages: 593 (Hardcover)
- ISBN: 978-1-84149-417-3
- OCLC: 176831809
- Preceded by: Look to Windward
- Followed by: Surface Detail

Matter is a science fiction novel from Iain M. Banks set in his Culture universe. It was published on 25 January 2008.

Matter was a finalist for the 2009 Prometheus Award.

== Creation ==
From an interview with The Guardian newspaper at the Hay Literary Festival on 25 May 2007:

Banks tells me that he has spent the past three months writing another Culture novel. It will be called Matter and is to be published next February. "It's a real shelf-breaker," he says enthusiastically. "It's 204,000 words long and the last 4,000 consist of appendices and glossaries. It's so complicated that even in its complexity it's complex. I'm not sure the publishers will go for the appendices, but readers will need them. It's filled with neologisms and characters who disappear for 150 pages and come back, with lots of flashbacks and -forwards. And the story involves different civilizations at different stages of technological evolution. There's even one group who have disappeared up their own fundaments into non-matter-based societies".

The working title of Banks' earlier novel The Steep Approach to Garbadale was also Matter.

== Synopsis ==
The book follows the experiences of three members of the royal household of the Sarl, a feudal, early-industrial humanoid race living on the eighth level of the Shellworld of Sursamen. Constructed for an unknown purpose by a long-dead race called the Veil, Shellworlds are ancient artificial planets consisting of nested concentric spheres internally lit by tiny thermonuclear "stars". The spheres are inhabited by various primitive races along with progressively more advanced mentoring species, up to the level of what the Sarl call "Optimae." (The Optimae themselves, particularly the Culture, prefer the term "Involved.") Approximately 4,000 Shellworlds were built, but over 2,000 were deliberately destroyed, for reasons unknown, by another presumed extinct race, the Iln. Like many Shellworlds, the core of Sursamen is known to be inhabited by a mysterious creature called a Xinthian Tensile Aeranothaur, whom the Sarl worship as their "WorldGod."

Prince Ferbin, the self-centred heir to the Sarl throne, has to flee his home level on the Shellworld and the Shellworld itself after witnessing the murder of his father, King Hausk, by Mertis tyl Loesp, the King's second-in-command. Prince Oramen, Ferbin's studious younger brother, is unaware of the treachery and trusts tyl Loesp fully. After Ferbin's disappearance—and presumed death—tyl Loesp takes on the role of regent, ostensibly until Prince Regent Oramen comes of age and can be crowned king.

The Oct, the direct mentoring species over the Sarl, meanwhile have been organizing the takeover of the ninth level of Sursamen (owned by the Deldeyn, another human nation of approximately equal level of development to the Sarl), using the Sarl royal court and military as their pawns. It becomes increasingly clear that they are searching for something hidden in the Nameless City, a metropolis buried under several hundred million years of sediment which is currently being stripped away by the giant Hyeng-zhar waterfalls. The ninth level was only recently re-colonised in a move by the Oct, which was retrospectively validated, with reluctance, by Sursamen's mentoring races, the Nariscene and the more senior Morthanveld. (The Culture itself has no jurisdiction over Sursamen, since the Morthanveld are - like the Culture - "High Level Involved", technically regarded as sort-of-equals in an uneasy although peaceful diplomatic relationship: although despite this, the human(oid) Sarl seem to have more affinity with the Culture although their hierarchy of patronage comes from the Morthanveld.) Opposed to the Oct at an approximately equal stage of development are another species, the Aultridia, who opposed the Oct's incursions into the ninth level, and there is a risk of Oct/Aultridia war breaking out - which may become worse if the intermediate-level Nariscene, themselves patrons of the Oct, are dragged into involvement, or worse still, the high-level Morthanveld themselves.

Elsewhere, Djan Seriy Anaplian, another child of King Hausk, had left Sursamen fifteen years earlier to become a member of the Culture as part of a cultural exchange and later joined the Culture's covert Special Circumstances (SC) intelligence and intervention organisation. Anaplian decides to return to Sursamen, originally to pay her respects to her dead father and presumed-dead brother. (Initial reports from Sursamen only described the king and prince's causes of death as combat-related.) Meanwhile, the fleeing Ferbin is seeking out his long-absent sister hoping that, with her powerful connections and SC access, she could help him attain revenge against tyl Loesp.

Within the Culture, other channels of intelligence later validate suspicions that the Oct are planning something mysterious on Sursamen and SC contacts Anaplian en route via a humanoid avatar of the Culture ship Liveware Problem, Klatsli Quike. SC asks Anaplian to investigate, upgrading her bereavement travel to an official Culture mission - one which will be necessarily highly sensitive since Sursamen is not under Culture jurisdiction, nor are any of the species involved in the Morthanveld chain of patronage. Quike is soon replaced by another avatoid of The Liveware Problem, Pone Hippinse, as Anaplian's tactical partner in the mission. Her combat drone, Turminder Xuss, had covertly stowed away in her belongings at the beginning of her journey, disguised initially as a Knife Missile resembling a dildo; Anaplian has had most SC tactical enhancements to her mind and body disabled for her personal journey out of diplomatic considerations, but she restores most of them after her trip is upgraded to an official mission, and Xuss will prove critically useful as well. At this point, Anaplian is reunited with her fugitive brother, Ferbin, and his faithful (but increasingly independently-minded) servant Choubris Holse.

Arriving at Sursamen on board the Liveware Problem, the team (Anaplian, Hippinse, Ferbin, Holse and Xuss) successfully infiltrate their way down to the Shellworld's ninth level to confront tyl Loesp, and protect their brother, Prince Oramen, both of whom are overseeing the excavation of the Nameless City. By the time the team arrives, Oramen has survived assassination attempts by tyl Loesp, but has been killed by a mysterious and powerful entity long entombed in the ancient ruins. Oramen had discovered—too late—that the entity is a ruthless machine created by or belonging to the long-dead race known as the Iln.

The liberated Iln machine's nature is a horrible surprise to the Sarl humans and especially the Oct, who thought that they were excavating one of the "Involucra" (aka the Veil) who had originally built the shellworlds and from whom they claim to be descended. The Iln entity kills all nearby Sarl and Octs - including both Oramen and tyl Loesp - with a small thermonuclear explosion—after thanking them for their help—and heads towards the core of the Shellworld, planning to capture the Xinthian "WorldGod" and then destroy Sursamen by generating and detonating antimatter.

With both tyl Loesp and their brother dead on the ninth level, Anaplian and Ferbin descend towards the Shellworld's core level with the rest of the team, equipped with intelligent SC-technology combat suits. The Liveware Problem itself speeds down a vast shaft into the Shellworld's interior to lead the team, but sustains substantial damage from Nariscene weapons during its descent to the core (it becoming increasingly apparent that all the various species involved have been getting their hands on technology from at least one level higher up the chain). The team is thus outgunned by the Iln device, which has taken over a Morthanveld guard ship and twelve other drones secretly emplaced in the core. Xuss is MIA. Hippinse's parent ship, the Liveware Problem, disposes of all but two of the Morthanveld drones then sacrifices itself in a suicide attack on the hijacked Morthanveld guard ship. Hippinse himself is killed eliminating one of the remaining drones; Anaplian accounts for the last one, but the Iln entity remains too strong for the remaining compatriots, whose resources are seriously depleted.

Ferbin sacrifices himself to the Iln machine and is killed outright, but satisfies the enemy that the humans are not dangerous and permits Anaplian a much closer approach. Despite her advanced armour, she is eviscerated beyond the point where a non-SC enhanced human would be dead, but she remains conscious enough to detonate the tiny grain of antimatter in her skull that provided power to her SC-enhanced body, destroying the Iln entity and saving the Shellworld.

In the epilogue, Holse, the lone survivor of the Iln encounter, rejoins his family after a long absence, accompanied by the surviving Liveware Problem avatoid, Quike. He declares his intention to become a political leader of a no-longer-monarchist Sarl, with the secret backing of the Culture.

== Unused material ==
An unused section of the first draft was published as the short story 'The Secret Courtyard' in a booklet called 'The Spheres', by the Birmingham Science Fiction group, in 2010, in a limited edition of 500, to mark Novacon 40.
