= The Hydrogen Sonata =

2012 novel by Iain Banks

- Author: Iain M. Banks
- Audio read by: Peter Kenny
- Language: English
- Series: Culture
- Genre: Science fiction novel
- Publisher: Orbit
- Publication date: 4 October 2012 (UK); 9 October 2012 (USA)
- Publication place: Scotland
- Media type: Print (hardcover)
- Pages: 528 (hardcover)
- ISBN: 978-0356501505
- Preceded by: Surface Detail

The Hydrogen Sonata is a science fiction novel by Scottish author Iain M. Banks, set in his techno-utopian Culture universe. The hardcover edition was released on 4 October 2012 in the United Kingdom, and on 9 October in the United States. The book's release marked 25 years since the publication of Banks' first Culture novel. A paperback edition of the book was released on 5 September 2013 in the United Kingdom, and on 10 September in the United States. The Hydrogen Sonata was Banks' last science fiction novel, as he died of gall bladder cancer in June 2013.

The Hydrogen Sonata of the title is a fictional work of music, a highly complex composition, which is woven into the plot. It is played on a stringed instrument which requires the player to sit in it like a chair. One of the novel's protagonists, Vyr Cossont, has undergone body enhancement to grow the two extra arms needed, ideally, to play it.

== Background ==
An official synopsis and preliminary cover art were released in February 2012. The novel's final cover art, which differed significantly from the preliminary art, was unveiled on 28 June 2012. At a book signing at Foyles in London, England, on 11 April 2012, Banks briefly described The Hydrogen Sonata as being "about the whole Subliming business". The first four chapters of the book were read by Banks and Kim Stanley Robinson at an event in the British Library on 9 June 2012. The sonata of the title was revealed to be an almost impossible-to-play musical piece.

== Plot ==
The Gzilt, a civilisation that almost joined the Culture 10,000 years before the novel, have decided to Sublime, leaving behind “the Real” to take up residence in higher dimensions. The Zihdren-Remnant, what is left of an older species that Sublimed before the Culture was formed, send an envoy to confess a long-kept secret before the Gzilt depart but a Gzilt warship intercepts and destroys their ship several weeks before the Sublimation is due to take place in order to preserve that secret.

The Culture sends ships both to wish the Gzilt well, as they have always been on good terms with the Gzilt, and to keep an eye on the younger species arriving to scavenge the technology and infrastructure the Gzilt leave behind. Two of these, the Liseiden (an eel-like species) and the Ronte (a hive insect-like species) are jockeying in negotiations with the Gzilt for official permission and preferred status.

Vyr Cossont is introduced as a former Lieutenant-Commander (reserve) of the Gzilt, who has set herself a life-task of playing T. C. Vilabier's 26th String-Specific Sonata For An Instrument Yet To Be Invented, the titular Hydrogen Sonata, on the instrument subsequently invented for its performance: the Antagonistic Undecagonstring, or elevenstring. In order to do so, she has had to grow two additional arms. Both the instrument and the work are presented as unusually challenging.

Spyware aboard the Gzilt warship has transmitted the secret to the 14th Regiment, traditional opponents of the current power structure and erstwhile dissenters in the decision to Sublime; they recruit Cossont, who once knew Ngaroe QiRia, a Culture citizen who may be able to verify the truth of the Zihdren secret. Alerted to their knowledge and doing all he can to ensure a smooth Sublimation, Septame Banstegeyn orders their destruction. Cossont barely escapes, and is eventually picked up by the Mistake Not…, a Culture ship of non-standard class. They begin to head towards the storage facility where Cossont left the mind state QiRia had given her, but are interrupted by intelligence that he had stopped at Xown, where Cossont had been living, some five years earlier. Despite confirmation that he had indeed stopped there, they are unable to locate the information they need.

Meanwhile, a group of Minds dealing with the issue wake Scoaliera Tefwe, a former lover of QiRia who has been Stored for many centuries. She agrees to try and track him down, and her mind state is sent to inhabit a pair of new bodies, stopping for information from an old drone. When she finds him, he reveals he has had the memories removed.

Cossont and the Mistake Not... successfully retrieve QiRia's mind-state, but only after being attacked in the storage facility on Banstegeyn's orders. Unfortunately, the memories have also been wiped from the mind state, and they have to return to Xown when they realise where they have been hidden. Cossont manages to retrieve the memories despite heavy attack and the loss of the ship's avatar.

The Gzilt Book of Truth is revealed to have been a sociological experiment by a fringe Zihdren scientist that was subsequently forgotten. This had been disclosed to QiRia and other members of the prospective Culture. After finding this out and deciding it would not affect the ability of the Gzilt to join the Culture being formed, their minds had been wiped of these memories. However, experimental memory storage augmentation in QiRia prevented the memories from being properly removed.

The other Minds in the group decide to keep the secret, and some 99.9% of the Gzilt Sublime. Cossont is one of the few that does not. She leaves behind her elevenstring instrument, and considers rejoining the Mistake Not... to visit QiRia at the planet where he is on retreat, and returning his memories.

== Analysis ==
The titular sonata, a fictional piece of music, is an extremely complex piece that is an example of a challenge for virtually immortal beings in post-scarcity societies, and potentially a metaphor for the interaction of such advanced civilizations with material reality.

== Reception ==
Stuart Kelly of The Guardian gave the novel a positive review, praising Banks' "gloriously baroque and silly" ideas and the "keen satire and... keener anger" of his political themes. Kirkus Reviews described it as "Sheer delight."
