= Transition (novel) =

2009 science fiction novel by Iain M. Banks

- First edition cover
- Author: Iain Banks
- Audio read by: Peter Kenny
- Language: English
- Publisher: Little, Brown and Company
- Publication date: 3 September 2009
- Publication place: Scotland
- Media type: Print (Hardback)
- Pages: 416 pp
- ISBN: 0-316-73107-2
- OCLC: 373479614

Transition is a novel by Scottish writer Iain Banks, first published in 2009. The American edition was published under the name "Iain M. Banks", which is the name Banks used for his science fiction work.

== Background ==
In an interview with The Guardian, Banks explained what he was aiming for: "With Transition, I wanted to prove something. I wanted to show I could do something like The Bridge again because until now, that has been my favourite."

While he has insisted it wasn't a commentary on American imperialism ("I don't think it's about America per se; it's more about power and the way that it is wielded in general") he does admit that the character The Philosopher is a way of addressing the Abu Ghraib torture and prisoner abuse scandal.

== Premise ==
The novel, taking place between the dismantling of the Berlin Wall and the 2008 financial crisis, focusses on the hidden organization called the Concern (also known as "L'Expédience"), which affect the lives of the novel's multiple narrators and characters. Banks uses the many-worlds interpretation of quantum mechanics theory to imagine "infinitudes" of parallel realities, between which The Concern's agents – known as Transitionaries – can "flit", intervening in events to produce what The Concern sees as beneficial outcomes for that world. Transitioning, or flitting, is only possible for people with a predisposed talent for such movement, who may only flit after ingesting a mysterious drug called "septus". When a Transitionary flits into another world, he or she temporarily takes control of the body of an existing inhabitant of that world, along with some of that body's residual idiosyncrasies (such as personality disorders and sexual preferences).

== Main characters ==
=== The Transitionary ===
Referred to in section headings as "The Transitionary", the character's name is Temudjin Oh. Like the majority of The Concern's operatives, he naturally inhabits a version of Earth called Calbefraques, which is an "Open" world – one in which the presence of the many worlds is commonly known about and accepted. Temudjin, or Tem, is one of The Concern's most skilled and prized Transitionaries, although much mistrusted by the organisation's de facto head, Madame d'Ortolan, owing to his formerly close relationship with a renegade Concern operative, Mrs Mulverhill.

=== Patient 8262 ===
A former Transitionary, now in hiding in a far-flung reality, posing as a patient in a hospital. Patient 8262 is in the end revealed to be Temudjin Oh.

=== Madame d'Ortolan ===
The de facto head of The Concern's Central Council, known for sexual predation. More than two hundred years old, Madame d'Ortolan has been accorded the honour of being allowed to transition permanently into a younger body when her older one is near death. An unstable genius, she is deeply worried about the influence of Mrs Mulverhill on the Concern's activities.

=== Adrian Cubbish ===
A City trader in the reality of our own Earth, Adrian is, at first, apparently not connected to the other characters or The Concern. He is a former drug dealer and arch-capitalist, who becomes extremely wealthy from his work as a trader, before setting up his own hedge fund.

=== Mrs Mulverhill ===
A former member of The Concern, a highly talented Transitionary and erstwhile teacher at The Concern's University of Practical Talents. She believes that the ruling elite of the Concern has ulterior motives and a hidden agenda for the actions they perform. After forming a close relationship with Temudjin Oh, she disappears, causing Madame d'Ortolan to become deeply paranoid about her motives and intentions.

Mrs Mulverhill theorises that Madame d'Ortolan is motivated, along with a need to control the Council (and therefore humanity), to ensure that none of the many Earth worlds are contaminated by alien contact. Her instructions to the transitionaries to kill, supposedly to eliminate evil workers, are suspected by Mrs Mulverhill as being the means of eliminating the possibility of alien contact for Earth in all its realities (or otherwise of covering up this motive). In a final scene, Mme 'O' appears to accept this accusation.

=== The Philosopher ===
A torturer and former employee of the police and army. The Philosopher likes to imagine himself as an ethical and thoughtful man – hence his sobriquet – and claims to take no pleasure in his work, seeing it only as a necessary evil.

=== Bisquitine ===
A young and apparently mad woman kept under close watch by the Concern. Through various extreme and unethical measures, the Concern has developed Bisquitine's transition powers to a very high degree. Thus crazy and possessed of superpowers, she is the Concern's secret weapon; a real loose cannon. In the end she is revealed to be an abused character we have briefly met in previous chapters, named "Subject 7".

== Reception ==
Doug Johnstone, writing for The Independent described the novel as one which "makes you think, one that makes you look at the world around you in a different light, and it's also a properly thrilling read. If only more contemporary fiction was like it."

Patrick Ness for The Guardian suggested the book has a "weird half-heartedness". He concluded "this is an airport novel, something for the flight from JFK to Eafrow [sic]. You're welcome to take that for as much of a recommendation as you choose."

== Unused material ==
In 2010, an unused section of the first draft was published by the Birmingham Science Fiction Group as a chapbook entitled "The Spheres". This a limited edition of 500 to mark Novacon 40.
