= Inversions (novel) =

1998 science fiction novel by Iain M. Banks

- Author: Iain M. Banks
- Audio read by: Peter Kenny
- Language: English
- Genre: Science fiction
- Publisher: Orbit Books
- Publication date: 1998
- Publication place: Scotland
- Media type: Print (hardcover and paperback)
- Pages: 345
- ISBN: 1-85723-626-2
- OCLC: 263665473
- Preceded by: Excession
- Followed by: Look to Windward

Inversions is a science fiction novel by Scottish writer Iain M. Banks, first published in 1998. Banks has said "Inversions was an attempt to write a Culture novel that wasn't."

== Plot ==
The book takes place on a fictional planet resembling Europe during the Late Middle Ages. A large empire broke up in the decade or so preceding the action, apparently from meteor or asteroid strikes that severely affected farming across much of the globe. The remnants of the empire still war with one another.

The narrative alternates chapter-by-chapter between two concurrent story-lines, with alternating chapter headings of The Doctor and The Bodyguard.

=== The Doctor ===
The first storyline is presented as a written account from Oelph, publicly a doctor's assistant, but privately a spy for an individual identified only as "Master", to whom much of the account is addressed. Oelph is the assistant to Vosill, the personal doctor to King Quience of Haspidus—and a woman. The latter is unheard of in the patriarchal kingdom, and is tolerated only because Vosill claims citizenship in the far-off country of Drezen. The King himself is appreciative of her and her talents, but nonetheless her elevated position in defiance of the kingdom's social mores inspires hostility among others of the court.

Oelph's account follows Vosill as she attends to the King regularly, as well as more charitable ministrations to the impoverished and those in need. Her methods are unconventional by kingdom standards, for example forgoing the use of leeches and instead using alcohol to "kill the ill humours which can infect a wound," but are more often than not successful. This only serves to inspire more distrust amongst her detractors, notably including a number of Dukes as well as the King's Guard Commander, Adlain. On this topic, Oelph includes a transcript he claims to have found in Vosill's journal, purported to be an exchange between Duke Walen and Adlain in which they make an agreement, "should it become necessary", to covertly kidnap the lady doctor and have Nolieti, the King's chief torturer, "put her to the question." Oelph notes that while the transcript appears to have been obtained under impossible circumstances, he somehow does not doubt its veracity.

While Vosill attends to the King, Nolieti is murdered, nearly decapitated, presumably by his assistant Unoure. Vosill examines the body and determines that Unoure could not have killed his master, but her explanation is disregarded. Unoure is captured, but before he can be questioned he is found in his cell dead from a cut throat, apparently self-inflicted. Following this account Oelph includes another found transcript, this time between Walen and Duke Quettil, though Walen is unable to obtain Quettil's agreement for the use of Ralinge, his own chief torturer, in Walen's kidnapping plan. Some days later at a masked ball Walen is found murdered, this time by a stab to the heart. The Duke's murder disquiets much of the royal house, as it occurred in a room no one entered or left.

Resentment towards Vosill continues to build, particularly after King Quience begins implementing somewhat radical reforms, such as permitting commoners to own farmland without the oversight of a noble and the creation of city councils, reforms which Vosill has discussed with the King publicly and at length. Following these reforms Vosill confesses to the King that she loves him, a sentiment he rebuffs, and further informs her that he prefers "pretty, dainty, delicate women who [have] no brains." Oelph finds her after this, drunk, and hints at his own feelings of love towards her; she rebuffs him as well, in what might be considered a more gentle way.

Some days later Vosill receives a note purportedly from Adlain, asking her to privately meet him and two other Dukes elsewhere in the castle. She leaves alone, but Oelph opts to follow her in secret; after catching a glimpse of someone fleeing, he arrives in time to be arrested by the guard, who proceed to discover Vosill standing over the body of a murdered Duke, stabbed with one of her scalpels. Vosill and Oelph are almost immediately delivered to Ralinge, who binds the two separately and then strips, intending to rape Vosill. The woman issues what sounds to Oelph like commands, albeit in a language he does not recognize even partially. Oelph's eyes are closed at this point, and in his narrative he is unable to adequately describe what he hears next, other than an impression of wind and metal. When he opens his eyes he finds Ralinge and his assistants dead, dispatched bloodily, and Vosill free and in the process of removing her bindings, with no indication of how she was freed. Later, she claims that Oelph fell unconscious and the three men fought over who would rape her first, though she indicates to him that this is what he "should" remember.

The two are taken from the torturer's chamber shortly thereafter, as the King has abruptly taken ill and appears to be dying. Vosill is able to cure King Quience's condition, and is there to witness as the conspiracy against her is revealed to the King, inadvertently, when news of Ralinge's death reaches the conspirators: Commander Adlain and Dukes Quettil and Ulresile. Ultimately the blame is publicly taken by Ulresile, who escapes with being exiled for several months; the King makes it clear that further plots against the doctor will not be tolerated. Because Oelph is not present for these events, his account comes second-hand from servants present; during this scene he reveals his master to be Guard Commander Adlain.

Vosill requests the King release her from her duties, which he does. She leaves just a few days later on a ship for Drezen, and is seen off at the dock by Oelph. Oelph tries to suppress the urge to ask to accompany Vosill, since he knows that her answer will be in the negative, but in the end he does so anyway. The ship leaves sometime later, and Vosill vanishes some days later.

=== The Bodyguard ===
The second, interleaved storyline is told by an initially unnamed narrator, remaining unnamed so as to provide a neutral context for the narrative. The story focuses on DeWar, bodyguard to General UrLeyn, the Prime Protector of the Protectorate of Tassasen. Protector UrLeyn is the leader of Tassasen, having killed the previous monarch in a revolt; subsequently he eliminated official terms such as "King" and "Empire" within Tassasen. At the beginning of the story the Protectorate is fast approaching a war with the neighbouring land of Ladenscion, led by barons who initially supported UrLeyn's revolution but now intend to establish themselves as independent.

DeWar is the sometimes-confidant of UrLeyn, but the bodyguard also maintains a friendly, conversational relationship with Perrund, a member of the Tassasen harem. Perrund was once the Protector's prized concubine, which changed following an assassination attempt on UrLeyn; Perrund shielded the Protector with her body, saving his life at the cost of crippling her left arm. Though no longer as prized as a concubine, Perrund is highly regarded by UrLeyn, DeWar, and most of Tassasen society. DeWar in particular finds her easy to confide in, and spends much of his off-time playing board games with her while the two tell each other stories.

DeWar is on high alert as the conflict with Ladenscion approaches, believing that someone within the court may be a traitor. An attempt is made on UrLeyn's life by an assassin disguised as an ambassador, though DeWar anticipates the threat and kills the man before he can succeed. Nonetheless, this act only reinforces DeWar's fears of a traitor.

A surprising, unwelcome turn comes when UrLeyn's young son, Lattens, has a seizure and subsequently falls ill. While the boy slowly recovers, DeWar tells him stories of a "magical land" called Lavishia, a place where "every man was a king, every woman a queen". Eventually the boy recovers, and UrLeyn and his bodyguard depart for the front lines, where the war with Ladenscion is flagging. However, no sooner are they there than word arrives that Lattens has fallen ill again, prompting a distraught UrLeyn to rush back to the castle.

While DeWar is gone, Perrund tells Lattens a story about a girl named Dawn, who spent most of her life locked in a basement by her cruel family and was eventually rescued by a travelling circus. When he returns, Perrund tells DeWar about the story, then tells him it was a shadow of the real story: her story. Rather than her parents locking her in the basement to be cruel, they locked her in to hide her from Imperial soldiers—high-ranking men of the former King's regime. Rather than being rescued, the soldiers found her, raped her, her mother and her sisters, and then forced her to watch as they murdered her father and brothers. The soldiers were eventually killed, but Perrund still feels she is now dead inside. DeWar attempts to in some way comfort her, but she responds bitterly and demands he return her to the harem.

Lattens' condition continues to worsen, causing UrLeyn to act more and more erratically, spending less time focusing on the war and more time at his son's bedside. The Protector goes so far as to bar all visitors to his chambers, and even prohibits DeWar from speaking to him unless he is spoken to. His only real contact is with Perrund, who spends most nights holding UrLeyn as he cries himself to sleep. DeWar enlists Perrund's help in focusing UrLeyn on the war, but to no success.

An epiphany strikes DeWar when he finds he has drooled on his pillow in his sleep, and he proceeds to Lattens' room. A guard restrains the boy's nurse while DeWar examines his security blanket, finding it has been soaked in an unknown fluid, presumably poison. Under threat of death the nurse reveals who has been orchestrating the poisoning: Perrund. DeWar storms into the harem chambers, intent on revealing the conspiracy to UrLeyn, but arrives too late; Perrund has already killed the Protector, and calmly waits for the bodyguard. Holding her at sword-point, DeWar tearfully demands to know why she conspired against the Protector. Perrund replies that she did it for revenge, for killing her and her family. The soldiers who raped her were not the former King's men at all, not even men allied to UrLeyn, but the man himself, as well as his current, closest advisers. Afterwards she was taken in by men from Haspidus, and recruited as a spy by King Quience directly. Saving UrLeyn from the assassin was simply to prevent him from dying while he was a strong leader; instead, her orders were to ensure he died in "utter ruin" to put his citizens off the idea of states without a monarch, as UrLeyn had envisaged Tassasen being.

After her confession, Perrund demands DeWar kill her. He silently refuses, lowering his sword. Perrund grabs his knife and brings it to her own throat, but it is quickly knocked away by DeWar's blade, which he lowers once more.

=== Epilogue ===
Oelph gives a brief, personal epilogue for both stories. The three conspirators who attempted to kill Vosill died of various diseases, only Adlain lasting longer than a few years. King Quience reigned for forty years before his death, and was succeeded by one of his many daughters, giving the kingdom its first ruling Queen. Vosill disappeared from the ship she departed on; her disappearance was only discovered after a sudden burst of wind and chain-fire struck the ship, then vanished as quickly. Attempts to notify Vosill's family in Drezen were unsuccessful: nobody in the island country could be found who had ever met her. Oelph himself became a doctor, eventually taking Vosill's post as the royal physician. Tassasen endured a civil war after the death of Protector UrLeyn; eventually King Lattens took control of the Empire, ruling it quietly.

Oelph explains that he stopped DeWar's story as he did because that is where versions of the story differ dramatically. The more popular version has DeWar personally execute Perrund, followed by a return to the Half-Hidden Kingdoms where he reclaims his hidden title as Prince, and eventually King. A second version, supposedly written by Perrund herself, instead has DeWar telling the waiting guards and staff that UrLeyn is fine but sleeping, this and other distractions providing enough time for him and the former concubine to flee Tassasen before the Protector's body is discovered. The two elude capture and arrive in the Half-Hidden Kingdoms, eventually marry, have several children, and die many years later in an avalanche in the mountains.

Finally, Oelph ends his epilogue by revealing that he expects his wife, whom he loves dearly, to return soon, quite possibly with his grandchildren accompanying her.

== References to the Culture ==
The initial hardback printing of the book contained the following "Note on the Text", which was omitted from subsequent paperback editions:

This Text, in two Parts, was discovered amongst the Papers of my late Grandfather. One Part concerns the Story of the Bodyguard to the then Protector of Tassasen, one UrLeyn, and is related, it is alleged, by a Person of his Court at the time, while the other, told by my Grandfather, tells the Story of the Woman Vosill, a Royal Physician during the Reign of King Quience, and who may, or may not, have been from the distant Archipelago of Drezen but who was, without Argument, from a different Culture. Like my much esteemed Grandfather, I have taken on the Task of making the Text I inherited more comprehensible and clear, and hope that I have succeeded in this Aim. Nevertheless, it is in a Spirit of the utmost Humility that I present it to the Society and to whoever might see fit to read it.

— O. Derlan-Haspid III, D.Phys, OM (1st class), ESt, RS (hons).

Some reviewers noted the joking reference to "Culture" in this.

DeWar's tales of Lavishia clearly parallel The Culture as it is described in Banks' other novels. He also tells of a pair of close friends who disagree about how their advanced society should manage contact with more primitive cultures:

Was it better to leave them alone or was it better to try and make life better for them? Even if you decided it was the right thing to do to make life better for them, which way did you do this? Did you say, Come and join us and be like us? Did you say, Give up all your own ways of doing things, the gods that you worship, the beliefs you hold most dear, the traditions that make you who you are? Or do you say, We have decided you should stay roughly as you are and we will treat you like children and give you toys that might make your life better?

It is evident that Vosill and DeWar are these two alien friends, now no longer in contact with each other, who have both come to the medieval planet and are independently attempting to do the "right thing" in their own differing ways, with Vosill being active and DeWar reactive.

Doctor Vosill also habitually carried with her a dagger that came to be peripherally involved in circumstances suggestive of a disguised Culture knife missile, to which dagger she referred as having been useful in "uncultured places". This dagger is also described as being encrusted with small gems, the number of which decreases over time—each gem probably one of the many different kinds of ammunition drone missiles are seen to be capable of firing throughout the Culture series.

The Epilogue contains this passage:

[...] the Doctor had been invited to dine with the vessel's captain that evening, but had sent a note declining the invitation, citing an indisposition due to special circumstances.

Special Circumstances is the euphemistic name given to the "black ops" division of the Culture's Contact section.

The epilogue also relates two different accounts of the fate of DeWar and Perrund. The second of these, where DeWar and Perrund hastily leave after she had killed UrLeyn, tells that the couple became merchants with their company symbol being "a simple torus, a ring, which might be cut from the end of a hollow pipe." Oelph then goes on to speculate that there is some connection between this symbol and facets of his own and the Doctor's story, though is of course unaware of the resemblance between the company's symbol and a Culture orbital.

== Reception ==
Kirkus Reviews described it as "Atmospheric, ironic, resourceful, and all the parts add up—yet something sets the teeth on edge."

== Awards ==
- 1998: British Science Fiction Award Nominee for Inversions
- 2004: Italia Science Fiction Award in the Best International Novel category for Inversions

== Bibliography ==
- Inversions, Iain M. Banks, London: Orbit, 1999, ISBN 1-85723-763-3 (paperback)
- Inversions, Iain M. Banks, London: Orbit, 1998, ISBN 1-85723-626-2 (hardback)
