= Excession =

1996 Book by Iain M. Banks

- First edition
- Author: Iain M. Banks
- Audio read by: Peter Kenny
- Cover artist: Mark Salwowski
- Language: English
- Series: The Culture
- Genre: Science fiction
- Publisher: Orbit Books
- Publication date: 1996
- Publication place: Scotland
- Media type: Print (Hardback & Paperback)
- Pages: 451
- Awards: Best Novel (1996) BSFA
- ISBN: 1-85723-394-8
- OCLC: 35379578
- Preceded by: Use of Weapons
- Followed by: Inversions

Excession is a 1996 science fiction novel by Scottish writer Iain M. Banks. It is the fifth in the Culture series, a series of ten science fiction novels which feature a post-scarcity, interstellar society called the Culture.

It primarily concerns the response of the Culture's Minds (benevolent AIs with enormous intellectual and physical capabilities and distinctive personalities) and other interstellar societies to an unprecedented alien artifact, the Excession of the title, and the way in which another society, the Affront, whose systematic brutality horrifies the Culture, tries to use the Excession to increase its power.

As in Banks's other Culture novels, the main themes are the moral dilemmas that confront a hyperpower, and how biological characters find ways to give their lives meaning in a post-scarcity society presided over by benign super-intelligent machines.

== Plot summary ==
The Excession of the title is a perfect black-body sphere that appears mysteriously on the edge of Culture space, appearing to be older than the Universe itself and that resists the attempts of the Culture and technologically equivalent societies (notably the Zetetic Elench) to probe it. The Interesting Times Gang (ITG), an informal group of Minds loosely connected with Special Circumstances, try to manage the Culture's response to the Excession. The Affront, a rapidly expanding race which practises systematic sadism towards subject species and its own females and junior males, also try to exploit the Excession by infiltrating a store of mothballed Culture warships and using them to claim control of the mysterious object.

The Sleeper Service, an Eccentric General Systems Vehicle (GSV) who had nominally left the Culture, is instructed to head to the location of the Excession by the ITG. As a condition the Sleeper Service demands that Genar-Hofoen, a human member of Contact, attend it to seek a resolution with his ex-lover, Dajeil, who lives in solitude on the GSV. They had had an intense love-affair and, after a series of sex changes, had each become impregnated by the other until Genar-Hofoen was unfaithful and Dajeil attacked Genar-Hofoen, killing the unborn child. Dajeil then suspended her pregnancy and withdrew from society for 40 years and the Sleeper Service hopes to effect a reconciliation between them.

As the stolen Affront fleet approaches the Excession, the Sleeper Service deploys a fleet of 80,000 remote controlled warships, in a misguided attempt to neutralize the threat. It transpires that the Affront have been manipulated into their grab for power by members of the ITG who thought it was morally imperative to curb the Affront's cruelty by any means, and intend to use the Affront's theft of Culture warships as an excuse for war. The Excession releases a wave of destructive energy towards the Sleeper Service. In desperation, the Sleeper Service transmits a complete copy of its personality, its "Mindstate", into the Excession, which has the effect of halting the attack. The Excession then vanishes as mysteriously as it appeared and the brief war with the Affront is halted.

During these events, and after speaking with Genar-Hofoen, Dajeil decides to complete her pregnancy and remain on the Sleeper Service, which sets course for a satellite galaxy. Genar-Hofoen returns to the Affront, having been rewarded by being physically transformed into a member of the Affront species (whose company he finds more stimulating than that of the Culture's people).

The book's epilogue reveals that the Excession is a sentient entity that was acting as a bridge for a procession of beings that travel between universes. It also assesses whether the species and societies it encounters are suitable to be enlightened about some unknown further existence beyond the universe; as a result of events in the story the Excession concludes that the civilisations it has encountered in this universe are not yet ready. It also takes the name given to it by the Culture – The Excession – as its own – in an oblique reference to the aforementioned Affront species, who had been named by another species in an attempt to label them as a lost cause of hyper-sadistic freaks.

== Outside Context Problem ==
This novel is about how the Culture deals with an Outside Context Problem (OCP), the concept introduced by Banks for the purpose of the novel. This is a problem that is "outside the context" as it is generally not considered until it occurs, and the capacity to actually conceive of or consider the OCP in the first place may not be possible or very limited (i.e., the majority of the group's population may not have the knowledge or ability to realize that the OCP can arise, or assume it is extremely unlikely). An example of OCP given by Banks is an unexpected encounter with an unconceivable technologically advanced civilization. Banks describes the concept as follows:

An Outside Context Problem was the sort of thing most civilizations encountered just once, and which they tended to encounter rather in the same way a sentence encountered a full stop. The usual example given to illustrate an Outside Context Problem was imagining you were a tribe on a largish, fertile island; you'd tamed the land, invented the wheel or writing or whatever, the neighbors were cooperative or enslaved but at any rate peaceful and you were busy raising temples to yourself with all the excess productive capacity you had, you were in a position of near-absolute power and control which your hallowed ancestors could hardly have dreamed of and the whole situation was just running along nicely like a canoe on wet grass... when suddenly this bristling lump of iron appears sailless and trailing steam in the bay and these guys carrying long funny-looking sticks come ashore and announce you've just been discovered, you're all subjects of the Emperor now, he's keen on presents called tax and these bright-eyed holy men would like a word with your priests.

Banks has noted that he spent much time playing the Civilization computer game (appearing to refer to the first version of the game series, at the time of writing the only one that had been released) before writing the book and that it was one of the inspirations for the concept of the 'Outside Context Problem' central to the novel. In an interview, Banks specifically compares this to having a Civilization battleship arrive while the player is still using wooden sailing ships.

== Literary significance and criticism ==
=== Banks's view of the Culture ===
The book, more than any of the other Culture novels, focuses on the Culture's Minds as protagonists. When asked about his focus on the possibilities of technology in fiction, Banks said about the book:

You can't escape the fact that humanity is a technological species, homo technophile or whatever the Latin is. Technology is neither good or bad, it's up to the user. We can't escape what we are, which is a technological species. There's no way back.

The book shows a number of Minds acting in a decidedly non-benevolent way, somewhat qualifying the godlike incorruptibility and benevolence they are ascribed in other Culture novels. Banks himself has described the actions of some of the Minds in the novel as akin to "barbarian kings presented with the promise of gold in the hills."

=== Reviews ===
Kirkus Reviews described the book as "Brilliantly inventive and amusing – whole sections read like strings of knowing jokes – but a mess: Chattering spaceships with splendid if confusing names [...] don't compensate for the absence of real characters." A few who praised it commented that Excession's complexity and frequent use of in-jokes make it advisable for new readers of Banks's Culture stories to start with other books. In a retrospective of Excession at Tor, Peter Tieryas writes, "There are literally paragraphs thrown in as background detail that could make for amazing novels of their own. Part of the joy of Excession is hearing the Minds speak with each other, that matrix-like shower of numbers, text, esoteric syntax, and witty repartee."

Reviewed in Arcane Magazine with a 10/10 rating, the novel was an "astounding achievement," regarded as "huge in scope, intricate in detail, swaying from pathos to metaphysics and from humour to light-speed action," with Banks considered, "a science-fiction writer truly without equal at the moment."
