= Data Centre Specialist Group =

logo of the DCSG, April 2012

The Data Centre Specialist Group (abbreviated as DCSG) is a Specialist Group (SG) of the British Computer Society (BCS). It was founded by Zahl Limbuwala, (also the CEO of Romonet) and held its first meeting in 2007.

The Data Centre SG intends to raise awareness and knowledge of the issues, opportunities and best practices within the field of data centres, thus building credibility as a body of expertise that can act as a source of authoritative information.

It aims to provide an avenue for the non-commercial assessment and dissemination of new technologies and practices and permit enhancement of the communication of requirements and capabilities between data centre professionals and their users.

The group organises a number of regular and ad-hoc events and meetings each year to cover relevant topics and provide for discussion and debate on data centre topics for its members, also working with other BCS Specialist Groups and Branches to cross-fertilise knowledge and experience. It has published several White Papers which are made available on the Group's website.
