= Romonet =

Romonet Ltd
- Type: Private
- Industry: Information technology Data center modeling software Data center consultancy
- Founded: 2006
- Number of locations: London, UK, San Francisco, United States
- Area served: Americas; Europe; Asia
- Key people: Rick Skett; (Chairman); Zahl Limbuwala; (Co-Founder, CEO & Exec. Director); Liam Newcombe; (Co-Founder & CTO); Darran Cox; (CFO); Sean Newcombe; (CCO)
- Products: Romonet Portal, Romonet Software Suite

Romonet is a UK-based, privately held company, headquartered in London, UK, that provides cloud-based solutions and services to data centers and associated technology. Romonet solves energy, water, capacity and financial challenges in data centers. They claim Romonet makes the first software that accurately predicts total cost of ownership (TCO) and properly model energy flow. They began by creating a term called 'data center predictive modeling' (DCPM) that "rather than collecting real-time data, they predict data center configuration and architecture." Romonet Inc was launched in 2011 with the goal of bringing the product to the US market.

In February 2019 it was announced that the CBRE Group would acquire Romonet.

== History ==
Romonet was founded in 2006 by Zahl Limbuwala and Liam Newcombe—initially to make software to analyze how much data centers cost to operate. Newcombe said, of IT cost, "The business is effectively prevented from managing operating costs or understanding the contribution to profitability." In 2009, they collaborated to release an open source engine with the British Computer Society's Data Centre Specialist Group. Though the simulator was at an early stage, it was able to predict cost and power usage.

On 24 June 2011, Romonet opened two new offices in the United States, their headquarters in San Francisco and an office in the Empire State Building in New York.

2009 – Partnered with British Computer Society and released a beta of a Cost and Energy simulator.

2009 June – Romonet & C-Net to partner to provide training on the EU Code of Conduct for Data Centres.

2009 November – Romonet board appoints Rick Skett, former Intel executive and 30-year veteran, as chairman of the board.

2010 November – Romonet launches Romonet Software Suite – the first ever software to predict energy use and cost over the entire lifecycle of a data center.

2010 November – Computer Weekly featured a review of Romonet Software Suite.

2011 February – Arup uses the Romonet Software Suite to provide visibility into their data center.

2011 February – Romonet announced Syska Hennessy Group and Skanska USA as official channel partners.

2011 May – Zahl Limbuwala gives keynote speech at Google Data Center Efficiency event in Zurich.

2011 June – Launch of Romonet Inc. in the United States.

2011 June – Skanska partners with Romonet to design efficient Data Centers.

2011 October – Romonet board appointed Michael J Fister, former Intel senior exec and CEO of Cadence, as director and member of the board.

2011 November – Launches V2.0 of its DCPM software, Romonet Software Suite, which incorporates significant extra enhancements including ability to model using Typical Meteorological Year (TMY) data.

2012 July – Romonet partners with Red Engineering Design.

2012 September – Romonet partners with CS&I who specialize in critical systems typically associated with data center, hospital, and financial trading facilities.

2012 November – Romonet launches Romonet Portal - a SaaS type product that is 'designed specifically to address the business and financial management needs of those that own and operate data centers.'

2012 November – Romonet partners with JCA Engineering.

2012 December – Romonet's principal mission-critical engineer, Dr. Ehsaan Farsimadan, wins 'Young Mission Critical Engineer of the Year' at DatacenterDynamics Datacenter Leaders Awards 2012.

2013 April – i3 Solutions Group and Romonet partner 'to bring first lifecycle TCO analysis to enterprise data center operators'.

2013 July – Launches Portal 2.0 - the latest version of its SaaS type product.

2013 November – Announces that in partnership with Canara (formerly Intellibatt) it is now able to provide a fully managed remote monitoring service for data centers.

2014 April – Romonet CEO presents at Lawrence Berkeley National Laboratory on the subject 'Data Centers – From a Cottage Industry to an Industrial and Information Age Revolution'.

2014 May – Romonet wins an inaugural Uptime Institute Brill Award (Product Services category) in conjunction with Compass Datacenters.

2014 October – Romonet CEO publishes a controversial blog An open letter to data center investors, which gains considerable comment and feedback.

2015 March – Romonet updates capabilities of Operations Portal, its SaaS product.

2015 March – Romonet partners with Vapor.io, 'the world's first hyper collapsed and truly data defined data center solution'.

2016 April – Romonet launches the "world's only water analytics" for the data center.

2017 January – Romonet launches its new certification program, Validated by ROMONET.

2019 February – CBRE Group acquires Romonet.

== Products ==
=== The Romonet platform ===
Romonet claims they have the only cloud-based, big data software platform that models, simulates, and predicts data center investment and operational performance. They say their analytics platform enables energy, financial, investment, and profitability objectives.

In November 2010, Romonet introduced Romonet Software Suite as a predictive modeling tool for data center decisions. Romonet claims that it uses mathematical computation and computer aided simulation to perform non-intrusive, risk-free predictive modeling. It does not require that the software directly interact with the data center, and can model data centers in a simulated environment.

A Chief Architect at Intel said 'Romonet Software Suite could be a game-changer as the leading TCO/Predictive modeling solution for the data center industry.‛ and Roy Illsley, principal analyst at Ovum Ltd "Predictive modeling enables companies to analyze and compare scenarios and say whether the move makes sense or not. Such level of knowledge and information is a great basis to make decisions, based on better assessments." The company hopes that Romonet Software Suite will succeed in the growing field for data center infrastructure management (DCIM) tools.

In November 2012, Romonet introduced Romonet Operations Portal a cloud-based solution that they intend data centre operators to use to forecast, plan, and measure business performance.

=== Romonet Operations Portal ===
Romonet Operations Portal is an online view of data center performance that tracks several metrics and facilitates comparison of expected performance (as modeled) and actual performance as reflected from meter readings through the facility's BMS system.

=== Validated by ROMONET ===
January 2017 saw the launch of Validated by ROMONET, the "first independent certification process to measure the full end-to-end performance of the data center" throughout its lifecycle.

== Environment ==
Liam Newcombe and Zahl Limbuwala regularly contribute to forums such as The Green Grid, a consortium collaborating to improve the resource efficiency of data centers and business computing ecosystems. Liam has actively been involved with and contributed to the EU Code of Conduct for Data Centres. Both Romonet Software Suite and Operations Portal identify the amount of CO_{2} a Data Center produces to help organizations plan how to operate with less impact on the environment.
