= Look to Windward =

2000 novel by Iain M. Banks

- First edition
- Author: Iain M. Banks
- Audio read by: Peter Kenny
- Cover artist: Mark Salwowski
- Language: English
- Series: The Culture
- Genre: Science fiction
- Publisher: Orbit Books
- Publication date: 2000
- Publication place: Scotland
- Media type: Print (Hardback & Paperback)
- Pages: 357
- ISBN: 1-85723-981-4
- OCLC: 43500306
- Preceded by: Inversions
- Followed by: Matter

Look to Windward is a science fiction novel by Scottish writer Iain M. Banks, first published in 2000. It is Banks' sixth published novel to feature the Culture. The book's dedication reads: "For the Gulf War Veterans". The novel takes its title from a line in T. S. Eliot's poem The Waste Land:

O you who turn the wheel and look to windward,
Consider Phlebas, who was once handsome and tall as you.

— T.S. Eliot, The Waste Land, IV. Death by Water

Look to Windward is in the same series as Consider Phlebas, Banks's first published Culture novel. Consider Phlebas took its name from the following line in the poem and dealt with the events of the Idiran-Culture War; Look to Windward deals with the results of the war on those who lived through it.

== Plot summary ==
The Chelgrians are a race of centaur-like cat aliens with three hind-limbs and a humanoid catlike torso. Major Quilan, a Chelgrian, has lost the will to live after the death of his wife, killed during the Chelgrian civil war that resulted from the Culture's interference. A high-ranked Chelgrian priest offers Quilan the chance to avenge the Chelgrians who died by taking part in a suicide mission to strike back at the Culture. His "Soulkeeper" (a device normally used to store its owner's personality upon their death) is equipped with both the mind of a long-dead Chelgrian admiral and a device given to the Chelgrians by a mysterious group of Involved aliens that can transport wormholes through which weapons can be delivered. Quilan is then sent to the Culture's Masaq' Orbital, ostensibly to persuade the renowned composer Mahrai Ziller to return to his native planet Chel, but in reality on a mission to destroy the Orbital's Hub Mind. To protect him from detection at Masaq', Quilan's memory is selectively blanked until he reaches his target, thus preventing the Mind from reading his thoughts.

Ziller lives in self-imposed exile on Masaq', having renounced his privileged position in Chel's caste system. He has been commissioned to compose music to mark a climactic event in the Idiran-Culture War. Upon hearing of Quilan's visit, and suspicious of his reason for travel, Ziller scrupulously avoids him.

Quilan succeeds in placing the wormholes in the Orbital's Hub, but the Mind was already aware of the plot because Quilan's operator, the long dead admiral housed in his Soulkeeper, is actually a turncoat spy for the Culture. Although unable to track the locations on the other ends of the wormholes, the Mind suggests that the Involved "aliens" assisting Quilan's mission may have been a group of bellicose Culture minds seeking to keep the Culture from being too complacent. Having struggled with painful memories of the Idiran-Culture war, when it was the General Systems Vehicle Lasting Damage, the Mind reveals to Quilan that it intends to destroy its own higher functions, essentially committing suicide, and offers to take Quilan with it. Quilan, who had become unsure of his own mission after experiencing dreams of his dead wife wearing the silvery skin of the Mind's avatar, agrees. They both commit suicide simultaneously during the climax of Ziller's concert, leading to much shock and outrage.

At the end of the novel, a nightmarishly efficient E-Dust Assassin is unleashed by the Culture in 'retribution' against the Chelgrian priest who acted as a pawn for the bellicose Culture Minds, as well as his immediate co-conspirators. The assassin kills the priest gruesomely by transforming into a swarm of insects that eat him from the inside out.

Throughout the book there is a subplot about a Culture ethologist named Uagen Zlepe spending his time on a distant alien air sphere and discovering hints about the Chelgrian plot to destroy the Masaq' Orbital's Hub Mind. He attempts to warn the Culture, and the reader is led to believe that his intervention is the reason why the Mind knew about Quilan's sabotage, but ultimately he fails to get his message out and is killed by one of the Chelgrian conspirators. His dead body is resurrected using alien technology an entire galactic grand cycle later, hundreds of millions of years after the events of the story have ended.

Back in the present, the Chelgrian admiral Huyler's personality, kept alive from Quilan's Soulkeeper, and the real source of the Mind's foreknowledge regarding the attack, is given a new body and becomes an ambassador to the Culture, enjoying a very high standard of living. He says he is close to convincing Ziller to return to Chel, fulfilling Quilan's cover mission.

The T.S. Eliot poem which the novel takes its name from is, in part:

Phlebas the Phoenician, a fortnight dead,
Forgot the cry of gulls, and the deep sea swell
And the profit and loss.
A current under sea
Picked his bones in whispers. As he rose and fell
He passed the stages of his age and youth
Entering the whirlpool.
Gentile or Jew
O you who turn the wheel and look to windward,
Consider Phlebas, who was once handsome and tall as you.

— T.S. Eliot, The Waste Land, IV. Death by Water

The fate of Phlebas in the poem is similar to that of Uagen Zlepe in the novel. The title may also refer to the state of mind of the Masaq' Orbital Hub Mind and Major Quilan, both already having died in spirit during their respective wars.

== Reception ==
Phil Daoust in The Guardian said the story was an "enjoyable romp" and described Quilan as "one of the misguided yet decent villains who are a feature of these [Culture] tales", going on to complain of the heavy emphasis given to the consequences of war and that the Chelgrians were too thinly disguised humans. Gerald Jonas in The New York Times praised the sophistication of Banks' writing and said "he asks readers to hold in mind a great many pieces of a vast puzzle while waiting for a pattern to emerge", although suggesting the ending might appear to rely too much on a deus ex machina. Kirkus Reviews described it as "By turns imposing, ingenious, whimsical, and wrenching, though too amorphous to fully satisfy."

== Editions ==
- Look to Windward, Iain M. Banks, London: Orbit, 2000, ISBN 1-85723-981-4 (paperback), ISBN 1-85723-981-4 (C-format), ISBN 1-85723-969-5 (hardback)
