= The State of the Art =

1989 novella by Iain M. Banks

- First edition of novella
- Author: Iain M. Banks
- Audio read by: Peter Kenny
- Cover artist: Arnie Fenner
- Language: English
- Series: The Culture
- Genre: Science fiction, Slipstream
- Publisher: Mark V. Ziesing
- Publication date: 1989
- Publication place: United States
- Media type: Print (hardback)
- Pages: 148
- ISBN: 0-929480-06-6
- OCLC: 20508759

The State of the Art is a 1989 novella by Scottish writer Iain M. Banks, and also the name of his 1991 short story collection (first published in the UK by Orbit) which includes the novella. The collection includes SF, both Culture and non-Culture, as well as non-SF works originally published under his other byline "Iain Banks".

== Editions ==
A US edition of the collection was published in 2004 by Night Shade Books, in hardback (ISBN 1-892389-38-X) and limited editions (ISBN 1-892389-99-1). The limited edition contains work by Banks not found in the UK version. A Trade Paperback edition was printed in Canada in 2007 by Night Shade Books, (ISBN 978-1-59780-074-7) It contains the additional text 'A Few Notes on the Culture'.

== Collection contents ==
- "Road of Skulls". Originally published in the anthology 20 under 35, Peter Straus (ed.) 1988, Sceptre, ISBN 0-340-48637-6.
  Two men in a carriage travel over the eponymous Road of Skulls, to reach a distant city that seems to be constantly retreating and producing the infinite road.
- "A Gift from the Culture". Originally published in Interzone #20, Summer 1987 with illustrations by SMS.
  A man in self-imposed exile from the Culture is pressured into committing an act of terrorism with the help of Culture technology.
- "Odd Attachment". Originally published in the anthology Arrows of Eros, Alex Stewart (ed.) 1989, New English Library, ISBN 0-450-50249-X.
  A lovesick alien encounters a humanoid explorer, and mutilates it in a game of "loves me, loves me not".
- "Descendant". Originally published in the anthology Tales from the Forbidden Planet, Roz Kaveney (ed.) 1987, Titan Books, ISBN 1-85286-004-9.
  A Culture soldier and his sapient spacesuit struggle to survive after being shot down and crash-landing on a barren planet.
- "Cleaning Up". Originally published in a limited edition of 500 by Birmingham Science Fiction Group as the Souvenir Book for Novacon 17 (1987) when Banks was Guest of Honour.
  An alien race discovers that a faulty teleporter has been sending junk onto the surface of Earth instead of the Sun, where scientists from across the world have been studying these "Gifts." The aliens covertly work with national authorities to recover the futuristic technologies. The last Gift to arrive is the malfunctioning teleporter itself, which the United States attempts to use for a first strike against the USSR. The teleporter fails and randomly sends nuclear devices across the world, devastating several nations.
- "Piece". Originally published in The Observer Magazine on 13 August 1989 with illustrations by Peter Knock.
  A commentary on religion and fundamentalism in the form of a recovered letter from the Lockerbie disaster.
- "The State of the Art". An original edition appeared in 1989 as a separate book (Mark V. Ziesing, ISBN 0-929480-06-6). The cover art was by Arnie Fenner, and a limited edition of 400 books in a slipcase appeared, signed by both artist and author.
  At 100 pages long, the title novella makes up the bulk of the book. The novella chronicles a Culture mission to Earth in the late 1970s, and also serves as a prequel of sorts to Use of Weapons by featuring two of that novel's characters, Diziet Sma and the drone Skaffen-Amtiskaw. Here, Sma argues for contact with Earth, to try to fix the mess the human species has made of it; another Culture citizen, Linter, goes native, choosing to renounce his Culture body enhancements so as to be more like the locals; and Li, who is a Star Trek fan, argues that the whole "incontestably neurotic and clinically insane species" should be eradicated with a micro black hole. The ship Arbitrary has ideas, and a sense of humour, of its own: "Also while I'd been away, the ship had sent a request on a postcard to the BBC's World Service, asking for 'Mr David Bowie's "Space Oddity" for the good ship Arbitrary and all who sail in her.' (This from a machine that could have swamped Earth's entire electro-magnetic spectrum with whatever the hell it wanted from somewhere beyond Betelgeuse.) It didn't get the request played. The ship thought this was hilarious."
- "Scratch". Originally published in The Fiction Magazine vol. 6, No. 6, Jul/Aug 1987.
  A stream-of-consciousness narrative that samples random sections of the future, eventually ending in an abrupt nuclear apocalypse. The following text that opens the story is simultaneously the title and part of the text: "OR: The Present and Future of Species HS (sic) Considered as The Contents of a Contemporary Popular Record (qv). Report Abstract/Extract Version 4.2 Begins (after this break);"

== Adaptations ==
"Piece" was adapted by Craig Warner for BBC Radio 5 and broadcast on 6 June 1991. It was directed by John York. The cast included:

- Munro - Bill Paterson
- Jack - Harry Jones
- Eve/Voice - Susan Sheridan

"The State of the Art" was adapted by Paul Cornell for the Afternoon Play slot on BBC Radio 4 and broadcast on 5 March 2009. The adaptation was directed by Nadia Molinari and the main cast was:

- The Ship - Antony Sher
- Diziet Sma - Nina Sosanya
- Dervley Linter - Paterson Joseph
- Li - Graeme Hawley
- Tel - Brigit Forsyth
- Sodel - Conrad Nelson

In late 2009 it was announced that the story "A Gift From the Culture" was in the early stages of being adapted for the cinema by Dominic Murphy, the director of White Lightnin'.

== Reception ==
In 1990 Mike Christie reviewed the novella for Foundation. Christie called it a "rare success" in the genre of utopian fiction, successfully merging the styles of political utopia and "high-tech sf". He praises Banks for showing a cast of believable, imperfect characters, who in turn make his utopia — the world of The Culture — more realistic.

== Bibliography ==
Banks, Iain M. (1991), The State of the Art, London: Orbit, ISBN 0-356-19669-0 (paperback ISBN 1-85723-030-2).
