= A Gift from the Culture =

Short story by Iain M. Banks first published in 1987

"A Gift from the Culture", published in 1987, is a short work of space opera, by the Scottish science fiction author Iain M. Banks. The story is an early venture into the "complex and unusual and very distant" setting of the Culture, which Banks would further develop through various full length novels, stories, and his essay "A Few Notes on the Culture".

It was re-published in the Banks anthology, The State of the Art (1991, ISBN 0-356-19669-0).

== Characters ==
- Wrobik Sennkil: the protagonist of the story. "Vreccile citizen...male, prime race, aged thirty, part-time freelance journalist... and full-time gambler." Wrobik, however, is also an alien, a Culture expatriate, "Bahlln-Euchersa Wrobich Vress Schennil dam Flaysse...born female, species mix too complicated to remember, aged sixty-eight, standard, and one time member of the Contact section.... and a renegade."
- Kaddus and Cruizell: two large Vreccile flunkies, to whom Wrobik is in arrears.
- Maust: Vreccile, a dancer in one of the Low City’s gay clubs, and Wrobik’s boyfriend.

== Plot summary ==
The story is set in Vreccis Low City, within the Vreccile Economic Community (VEC). From the opening passages, it could easily unfold as a classic noir tale: a rainy night outside a gambling club, Kaddus and Cruizell confront the reluctant but indebted Wrobik with a dead-end deal. In a couple of days a starship carrying the planet’s admiral will be returning, and Wrobik is to shoot it down, over the city, using a small pistol which they give him to use. It is only when the gun is placed in his hands, does it become clear that this is another reality: it "comes to life," lights blinking, small screen flickering. The pistol will function only for those biologically of the Culture, and is the only weapon able to penetrate the starship’s defenses, making the alien Wrobik the perfect candidate for the job.

Eight years ago Wrobik left the high-minded and highly advanced Culture for the unabashedly corrupt world of the VEC. He describes the Culture as a sterile, self-assured communist-bloc utopia, a powerful society with an agenda of hypocritical moral imperialism, backed by Special Circumstances — "Dirty Tricks in other words."

Almost in the background, the xenophobic VEC is waging "distant wars against aliens, outworlders, subhumans;" civilian deaths going unnoted in the news reports. There have been demonstrations, one of which continues to give Wrobik nightmares — visions of the human military-machine charging forward. There is also the ‘radical’ organization, considered ‘terrorists’ by most, called "Bright Path," which apparently supplied the gangsters with the rare gun. Wrobik would be living in the besieged Outworlder’s Quarters himself, but nobody besides Maust, he thought, knew of his alien identity.

While still in the Culture, Wrobik, then Bahlln-Euchersa (etc.), went through a process of "regendering," changing sex (physically), from female to male. Despite her hopes, her (mental) gender and sexual orientation did not morph along with her body. Though still a woman in his own mind, since living in the VEC, Wrobik has accepted the identity that society has bestowed upon him: that of a homosexual male, and has found happiness with Maust. "I would not be a woman in this society," he states, implying that, despite the homophobic society which is shown, this perhaps is the better option.

Wrobik attempts to flee the VEC, in order to avoid his task, which would make him the murderer of not only a high official, but possibly hundreds of civilians. Overheard news that an ambassador from the Culture is to be on the targeted starship as well further dissuades him, and also brings up questions about the true purpose of the attack. Before Wrobik can skip town (or planet), though, Kaddus and Cruizell get hold of Maust and use him as leverage. Wrobik is forced to stay and carry out his assignment in order to assure his safety.

The story ends with Wrobik completing his mission, the ship fallen and the distant city ablaze with the fire from the explosions. He never wanted to hurt anyone, but maybe now he is the terrorist. We do not know his fate; he pockets the gun, and "[races] down to join all the other poor folk on the run."

== Film adaptation ==
In 2009, plans were announced for a film adaptation by Mass Productions, jointly owned by Mike Downey and Sam Taylor of Film and Music Entertainment together with director Dominic Murphy, who was to be co-writing the screenplay with Shane Smith.

== Reception and analysis ==
A Gift from the Culture is one of Banks' few short stories. Kathryn Cramer and David G. Hartwell note that its protagonist, who is coerced into committing mass murder, reminded them of Luke Skywalker and Mohamed Atta.
