= Consider Phlebas =

1987 novel by Iain M. Banks

- First edition
- Author: Iain M. Banks
- Audio read by: Peter Kenny
- Cover artist: Richard Hopkinson
- Language: English
- Series: The Culture
- Genre: Science fiction
- Publisher: Macmillan
- Publication date: 23 April 1987
- Publication place: United Kingdom
- Media type: Print (hardback & paperback)
- Pages: 471
- ISBN: 0-333-45430-8
- OCLC: 15197422
- Followed by: Descendant

Consider Phlebas, first published in 1987, is a space opera novel by Scottish writer Iain M. Banks. It is the first in a series of novels about an interstellar post-scarcity society called the Culture.

The novel revolves around the Idiran–Culture War, and Banks plays on that theme by presenting various microcosms of that conflict. Its protagonist Bora Horza Gobuchul is an enemy of the Culture.

Consider Phlebas is Banks's first published science fiction novel, and takes its title from a line in T. S. Eliot's poem The Waste Land. A subsequent Culture novel, Look to Windward (2000), whose title comes from the previous line of the same poem, can be considered a loose follow-up.

== Plot summary ==
The Culture and the Idiran Empire are at war in a galaxy-spanning conflict. A Culture Mind, fleeing the destruction of its ship in an Idiran ambush, takes refuge on Schar's World. The Dra'Azon, godlike incorporeal beings, maintain Schar's World as a monument to the world's extinct civilisation and the dangers of nuclear proliferation, forbidding access to both the Culture and the Idirans. Horza, a shape-changing mercenary, is rescued from execution by the Idirans who believe the Dra'Azon guardian may let him onto the planet as in the past he was part of a small group of Changers who acted as stewards. They instruct him to retrieve the Mind.

During Horza's extraction, the Idirans also capture a Special Circumstances agent, Perosteck Balveda. However, the Idiran starship on which he is travelling is soon attacked by a Culture vessel, and Horza is ejected. He is picked up by a pirate ship, the Clear Air Turbulence (CAT). He is forced to fight and kill one of the crew to earn a place. The captain, Kraiklyn, leads them on two disastrous pirate raids in which several of the crew perish. After the second raid Horza is taken prisoner by a cult living on an island on the orbital Vavatch, which is scheduled to be destroyed by the Culture. He escapes after poisoning the cult leader and makes his way to Evanauth, the main city of Vavatch, where he finds Kraiklyn, who is playing "Damage"—a high-stakes card game played by the most notorious characters in the galaxy, usually at a location about to be destroyed.

Having now changed his appearance to mimic that of the CAT captain, Horza follows him back to the CAT, kills him and returns to the CAT meeting the few remaining original crew. He is introduced to a newly recruited member, whom he recognises as a disguised Perosteck Balveda. Culture agents outside try to capture the ship. Horza manages to lift off and as the fugitives warp away from Vavatch, they see the evacuated Orbital destroyed by the Culture warships to prevent it from falling into enemy hands. Balveda reveals Horza's identity, but he convinces the crew to carry out his mission. A sentient Vavatch drone, Unaha-Closp, has been trapped on the ship and reluctantly joins the team.

They land on Schar's World and search for the Mind in the Command System, a complex of subterranean railway stations formerly part of a nuclear missile complex. These were built by the inhabitants of Schar before their extinction. Horza has kept Balveda alive, and she is taken with the rest of the crew into the complex. They soon discover that the Mind is being hunted by a pair of Idiran soldiers who have killed all the Changers stationed on the planet, and who regard Horza and his crew as enemies, having no knowledge of the Changers' alliance with the Idirans. The CAT's crew encounter the Idirans in one of the Command System stations, and after a firefight apparently kill one and capture the other. After tracking the Mind to another station, they discover it hiding in the reactor car of a Command System train. The second Idiran, who had been mortally wounded but not killed, sets one of the trains for a collision course to the station. The captured Idiran, Xoxarle, frees himself and in the ensuing impact and firefight the remaining members of the Clear Air Turbulence are killed. Horza pursues Xoxarle and is fatally injured, but the Idiran is killed by Balveda.

Horza dies soon after Balveda gets him to the surface, and the Mind is returned to the Culture. In an epilogue, the Mind becomes a starship, and reveals having taken the name Bora Horza Gobuchul.

== Characters ==
- Bora Horza Gobuchul is a Changer and an operative of the Idiran Empire. He was one of a party of Changers allowed on Schar's World, and for that reason is tasked by the Idirans with retrieving a Mind that had crashed to the planet. Horza is humanoid, but committed to the Idiran cause despite the fact that he does not believe in their god and does not agree with their harsh and aggressive expansion. He despises the Culture for its dependence on machines, and the fact that Culture's machines seemingly rule over the Culture humans, which he perceives to be spiritually empty and an evolutionary dead end.
- Juboal-Rabaroansa Perosteck Alseyn Balveda dam T'seif, usually referred to as Perosteck Balveda, is an operative of the Culture assigned to track and apprehend Bora Horza Gobuchul. She works for the Special Circumstances branch of Contact, and despite being ambivalent about the methods they use, deeply believes in their objectives.
- Kraiklyn is the captain of the Clear Air Turbulence.
- Yalson is a slightly furry humanoid woman working aboard the Clear Air Turbulence. She forms an intimate relationship with Horza during the time he is aboard the ship.

== History and theme ==
Consider Phlebas, like most of Banks's early SF output, was a rewritten version of an earlier book, as he explained in a 1994 interview:

Phlebas was an old one too; it was written just after The Wasp Factory, in 1984. I've found that rewriting an old book took much more effort than writing one from scratch, but I had to go back to do right by these things. Now I can go on and start completely new stuff.

On the theme of the novel, he said:

There's a big war going on in that novel, and various individuals and groups manage to influence its outcome. But even being able to do that doesn't ultimately change things very much. At the book's end, I have a section pointing this out by telling what happened after the war, which was an attempt to pose the question, 'What was it all for?' I guess this approach has to do with my reacting to the cliché of SF's 'lone protagonist.' You know, this idea that a single individual can determine the direction of entire civilizations. It's very, very hard for a lone person to do that. And it sets you thinking what difference, if any, it would have made if Jesus Christ, or Karl Marx or Charles Darwin had never been. We just don't know.

== Literary significance and criticism ==
The book was generally very well received as a fast-paced space opera with a morally ambiguous hero and much grand scenery and devices. Kirkus Reviews described it as "Overextended and jarring", but "imaginative and gripping in places."

Dave Langford reviewed Consider Phlebas for White Dwarf #90, and stated that "Banks pumps in enough high spirits to keep this rattling along to his slam-bang finale in the bowels of an ancient deep-shelter system whose nuclear-powered high-speed trains are used for... well, not commuting."

== In other media ==
=== TV adaptation ===
Amazon announced in February 2018 that it acquired the global television rights to Consider Phlebas, to be adapted by Dennis Kelly into a television series and produced by Plan B Entertainment. The project was cancelled in August 2020.

However, in February 2025, Deadline reported that Amazon MGM Studios was developing a television series of Consider Phlebas, to be written by Charles Yu.

== Bibliography ==
- Consider Phlebas, Iain M. Banks, London: Macmillan, 1987, ISBN 0-333-44138-9 (paperback ISBN 1-85723-138-4)
