= Feersum Endjinn =

1994 novel by Iain M. Banks

- Cover of first edition (hardcover)
- Author: Iain M. Banks
- Language: English
- Genre: Science fiction
- Publisher: Orbit Books
- Publication date: 1994
- Publication place: Scotland
- Media type: Print (Hardback & Paperback)
- Pages: 279
- ISBN: 1-85723-235-6
- OCLC: 30779268
- Preceded by: Complicity (novel)
- Followed by: Whit

Feersum Endjinn is a science fiction novel by Scottish writer Iain M. Banks, first published in 1994. It won a British Science Fiction Association Award in 1994.

The novel is sometimes referred to as Banks' second science fiction novel not set within the Culture universe, the first being Against a Dark Background.

== Setting ==
The book is set on a far future Earth where the uploading of mindstates into a world-spanning computer network (known as "Cryptosphere", "the Data Corpus", or simply "Crypt") is commonplace, allowing the dead to be easily reincarnated, a set number of times, first physically and then virtually within the crypt. The crypt has become increasingly chaotic, causing much concern within society. Much of the story takes place within a giant, decaying megastructure known as the "Fastness" or "Serehfa" built to resemble a medieval castle, in which each "room" spans several kilometers horizontally and vertically, and King Adijine's palace occupies one room's chandelier. The structure used to be a space elevator, left behind by the ancestors of those who remained on Earth, with the circuitry of the crypt built into its structure. The world is in crisis as the Solar System is slowly drifting into an interstellar molecular cloud ("the Encroachment"), which will eventually dim and then destroy the Sun, ending life on Earth.

== Plot summary ==
The narrative switches between four main characters. Count Alandre Sessine VII is a high-ranking member of the court who is assassinated, ending his last life. Reborn inside the crypt he comes under repeated attack and is almost permanently killed. On his last virtual life, he makes contact with a copy of himself who assists him. He spends many subjective years wandering the wider reaches of the crypt before being contacted by its representative who requests his aid in relation to the Encroachment.

Hortis Gadfium III, the Chief Scientist of the ruling class, is engaged in a conspiracy with like-minded nobles who believe that the elite are not acting in the best interests of the population, and who question the real motive of the ongoing war with the rival clan of Engineers. She learns of a message apparently sent from the fast tower, the highest and previously inaccessible part of the castle, which stresses the danger of the Encroachment and tells of an attempt by the crypt to activate a long-forgotten subsystem which may prevent disaster. The message also warns that this will be opposed by those in power as it will threaten their interests. She and her fellow conspirators are considering how to respond when the security forces attempt to arrest them, although Gadfium manages to escape into the depths of the castle.

Bascule the Teller is a young man who contacts the dead personalities within the crypt on behalf of their relatives or other interested parties. Whilst searching for a lost friend, he attracts the attention of the Security forces and takes refuge with various chimeric animals whose implants have taken on personalities from within the crypt. He is eventually tasked with ascending the central shaft of the highest tower in a vacuum balloon in order to reach its control room.

Asura is a young woman who awakens in a re-incarnation facility with no memory. She is compelled to travel towards the castle, rapidly gathering knowledge about the world before being captured by the security forces. She is interrogated within the crypt, but is able to resist the questioning, becoming stronger at understanding and manipulating her virtual environments. As she escapes her virtual prison, she is physically freed by Gadfium, assisted by the copy of Count Sessine who guided her to Asura's location. Asura broadcasts to the world the truth regarding the Encroachment and the attempts of the monarchy to prevent the activation of the crypt sub-systems. She explains her origin, being an emissary of the crypt that was combined with the mind of Count Sessine who sacrificed himself in the process. She was created by the crypt because the relevant systems were kept separate by their designers to prevent infection by chaos. The so-called chaotic elements of the crypt are a burgeoning ecology of Artificial Intelligences. Asura states that both the humans and chaos will have to learn to live with each other. Asura and Gadfium depart, reaching an elevator which is activated for them by Bascule after reaching the control room at the summit of the tower. Asura is able to activate the "Fearsome Engine" of the title, which begins the slow process of relocating the solar system out of reach of the cloud.

== Writing style ==
A quarter of the book is told by Bascule the Teller and is written phonetically in the first person using phonetic transcription and shorthand (also evinced in the novel's title). No dialect words are used, but there are hints of a Scottish and a Cockney accent.

== Reception ==
Feersum Endjinn was generally well-received, and the completeness of the plot and the detailed description of the mega-architecture and the crypt were praised by critics.

Literary critic and historian Ian Duncan has argued that Banks's ‘fearsome engine’, like his The Bridge, “is another allegory of the state, except that this apparatus is not just sublime in its dissociation from human accountability – it is omniscient, providential, and even organic.” Kirkus Reviews described it as an "extraordinary, often brilliantly inventive odyssey," concluding, "Dazzling stuff: a shame it doesn't add up."

Reviewer Edward Terry recommended the book, praising the variety of the archetypes: "Virtual reality, reincarnation, Hindu, fairy tales, myths, legends, virus programs, reality, nanotech, the four horsemen, necromancy, aeons and microseconds – it's all there woven together." The Fantasy Literature website awarded it 4.5 out of 5 stars and complimented its melding of genres: the "baroque and playful" novel "spends much time flitting in and out of the virtual Crytosphere, which might have given it a cyberpunk flavor, but since the imagery and events in the Crypt often resemble a fantasy quest, the book feels much more like a far-future science fantasy along the lines of Gene Wolfe's The Book of the New Sun and Jack Vance's Dying Earth novels."

Feersum Endjinn was cited as one of the inspirations for the backstory of the real-time strategy game Total Annihilation.

== See also ==
- Simulated reality

== Sources ==
- Banks, Iain M. (1994). Feersum Endjinn. London: Orbit. ISBN 1-85723-235-6.
