= Gary Lloyd =

British composer

Gary Lloyd (born 1965) is a Canadian-born British composer and producer. He has composed music for productions in theatre, contemporary dance, television drama and documentary, film, art installation, son et lumiere, narrative/music works, and orchestral concert performances. He also works as a record producer, and lectures on aspects of music. He is a graduate of the University of Chester where he studied mathematics, fine art and history of art, and psychology.

He lives in Chester with his partner the dancer and choreographer Bettina Carpi.

== Past works ==
Past works include the theatrical scores for Jean-Paul Sartre's 'Huis Clos' (No Way Out) (2001) and Arthur Kopit's Road To Nirvana (2006) both directed by actor and director Colin McFarlane, soundtracks for the Tshukudu series of wildlife documentaries by Marianne Wilding (1998–2005), music for the contemporary dance piece Nocturne choreographed by Marc Brew (2009 and onwards including a performance at Sadler's Wells in 2014), music for installations with the artist Michelle Molyneux (2007), and music for the contemporary dance piece Track choreographed by Paula Hampson (1997–1998). Earlier works include the soundtrack for the stage version of Neil Gaiman and Dave McKean's 'Violent Cases' directed by Eric Jarvis (1988).

He created two narrative/music pieces that were released on CD: the first based on The Bridge (1996) by Iain Banks and the second Brought to Light (1998) based on the comic book written by Alan Moore. Lloyd worked in collaboration with the novelists on each and Banks and Moore each voiced their respective works. Banks and Lloyd were frequent collaborators and they co-composed a collection of songs as an album in tribute to the fictional band from Banks's novel Espedair Street – a tribute to a band that never existed – first mooted in 1999 by Lloyd and also discussed in Banks's only non-fiction book Raw Spirit. This collaborative project between Banks and Lloyd was restarted in 2005 and although the groundwork of the project was completed to date it remains unreleased. Lloyd spoke at length about his work with Banks at the 2014 Huddersfield Literature Festival and about his work with Moore at the 2010 Magus Conference at the University of Northampton.

In 2014 Lloyd composed The Bridge Redux (In Memoriam Iain Banks) which was performed by the Worldcon Philharmonic Orchestra and conducted by Keith Slade at Loncon 3, the 72nd World Science Fiction Convention, at the ExCeL London to an audience of four thousand. He introduced the piece with a personal tribute to Banks who was guest of honour.

== Company Carpi ==
Company Carpi is the name of the dance theatre company established by Bettina Carpi and Gary Lloyd. The company aim is to produce work which "combines music & dance with other art forms to present imaginative live performance pieces which address societal topics".

Company Carpi's first fully funded (by Arts Council England and other sources) production was The Mirror Of Love based on the prose-poem by Alan Moore which was first performed in 2017. The company followed this in 2018 with Knots based on the book by revolutionary psychiatrist R.D. Laing, The Stumbling Block based on the poetry cycle by Brian Catling in 2019, and in 2021/22 When You Light A Candle, You Also Cast A Shadow featuring a poetry cycle by Mary Talbot who was specially commissioned for the piece. When You Light A Candle, You Also Cast A Shadow was nominated for a One Dance UK Award in 2022.

== Works in progress ==
Lloyd is currently working with Bettina Carpi on a dance theatre adaptation of Mary Talbot and Bryan Talbot's Costa Award-winning graphic novel 'Dotter of her Father's Eyes'. Lloyd, Carpi, the Talbots, and dancer Christopher Owen presented work in progress at the Huddersfield Literature Festival 2015. The eventual form of the production will be opera with dance, extracts of the opera were presented at Dublin Worldcon in August 2019 in the 2000 seat auditorium of the CCD in Dublin, and performed by a cast of three singers, an actor, two dancers and the 53-piece Worldcon Philharmonic Orchestra, conducted by Keith Slade.

Lloyd is also currently in the preparatory stages of composing his first orchestral symphony.

In Spring 2023 Company Carpi will tour their One Dance UK Award 2022 nominated piece When You Light A Candle, You Also Cast A Shadow around North West UK and will also launch an original anthology opera called Disunited Jukebox composed by Gary Lloyd with around twenty guest librettists, including established and well-known writers as well as emerging young talent.
