= The Steep Approach to Garbadale =

2007 novel by Iain Banks

- First edition
- Author: Iain Banks
- Audio read by: Peter Kenny
- Language: English
- Genre: Novel
- Publisher: Little, Brown
- Publication date: 2007
- Publication place: Scotland
- Media type: Print (Hardback)
- ISBN: 0-316-73105-6
- OCLC: 225057117
- Dewey Decimal: 823./914 22
- LC Class: PR6052.A485 S74 2007b
- Preceded by: The Algebraist
- Followed by: Matter

The Steep Approach to Garbadale is a novel by the Scottish writer Iain Banks, published in 2007. The novel had at least two working titles, Matter and Empire!

== Plot introduction ==
The book describes the Wopuld family, who made a fortune on a board game called Empire!, now a successful computer game. A US firm, the Spraint Corporation, wants to buy them out.

== Plot summary ==
Alban McGill, a member of the Wopuld family, has sold most of his shares in the family firm, and resigned from his job in the company to become a forester, but has had to retire on medical grounds because of white finger. He is distracted from affairs of business by his relations with his family and with his teenage love, his first cousin Sophie.

McGill is approached by another cousin, Fielding, to help prevent the sale of the family company to the American Spraint Corporation. He also seeks a resolution of certain questions about his family background, and closure of his relationship with Sophie. Much of the book is a build-up to the Extraordinary General Meeting which will decide on the sale, which takes place at the family estate at Garbadale in Sutherland. His current girlfriend, mathematician Verushka Graef, is a hillwalker, and near the end of the book Alban goes for a walk in the hills to think. On his return he takes the steep approach back to Garbadale.

Significant portions of the action are set in California, Singapore and Hong Kong, as McGill reminisces about his world travels during his gap year. His mother's suicide is described in detail, as is his relationship with the family matriarch, Grandma Win.

Banks takes the opportunity, as in Dead Air and Raw Spirit, to make points about the morality and wisdom of the war on terrorism, when McGill meets representatives of the American capitalists who wish to acquire the family game symbolising the British Empire.

The book has intermittent contributions from McGill's friend and ex-colleague Tango, who lives in a council estate in Perth, Scotland.

== Literary significance and criticism ==
The book has attracted comparison with The Crow Road. Both involve a reunion of a large Scottish family, and both feature a dark secret at the heart of the family.
