= Complicity (disambiguation) =

Complicity is a legal term describing participation in a completed criminal act by an accomplice.

The term may also be used to refer to:

- Complicity (novel), a 1993 novel by Iain Banks
  - Complicity (film), a 2000 film based on the novel
- Complicit (film), a 2013 British television film
- Complicit (play), a 2009 play by Joe Sutton
