= Canal Dreams =

1989 novel by Iain Banks

- First edition
- Author: Iain Banks
- Language: English
- Publisher: Macmillan Publishers
- Publication date: 1989
- Publication place: Scotland
- Media type: Print (Hardback & Paperback)
- Pages: 239 pp
- ISBN: 0-333-51768-7
- OCLC: 20133142

Canal Dreams is a novel by Scottish writer Iain Banks, published in 1989.

== Introduction ==
Famous Japanese cellist Hisako Onoda boards a supertanker en route to her concert in Rotterdam, as she is afraid to fly. The ship is trapped in the Panama Canal as a result of an international crisis and anchors in Gatun Lake. Hisako is Banks' first female lead character (he uses others in Whit and The Business).

Banks himself did not rate the book very highly:

"I always worry, with all these things. Canal Dreams was my first attempt at a political thriller - an action book. As a political thriller it's not very good and a sign that it's not so good at what it's supposed to be doing is that it would be so easy to take the politics out and make a pro-CIA propaganda movie. If it's that easy to strip out, the political element, I haven't done my job properly.

When asked about possible film rights in an interview, Banks replied:

"Och yeah. At the moment there's some interest in Canal Dreams although I think I could only sell it to Oliver Stone, anybody else doesn't have the clout not to get shoved off the picture and they'd just make it and turn it into American CIA propaganda. ... Actually of all the books, Canal Dreams is the one I'm least pleased with. By the usual reckoning, the worst books make the best films, so going on that it might be quite a good film! Make a film like Die Hard and cut out most of the first half of the book."

== Plot summary ==
The plot is fairly simple. In the first half, when the ship is stranded but unharmed, the mood is bucolic and philosophical, and the main challenge Hisako has is to pass the time in a tropical lake. She has an affair with one of the ship's officers and they go scuba diving together. She practises the cello.

She is worried about the future, and has violent nightmares and flashbacks to her early life in Japan.

She also spends time with the other passengers, among them a South African engineer and an erudite Egyptian.

In the much darker second half, the book becomes an almost Die Hard-like thriller. Guerrillas (who turn out to be agents provocateur) take over the ship. The rebels kill everybody aboard except Hisako and rape her. She avenges herself, killing the pirates. The violence of the rebel takeover and of Hisako's revenge is described very graphically.
