= David Batchelor (sound mixer) =

English sound mixer

David "Dickie" Batchelor (7 March 1941 in England – 3 May 2005 in Ipswich, Suffolk) was an English sound mixer.

He worked for the BBC and Anglia Television, before going freelance. John Lloyd worked closely with him for years. In the 1980s he settled for television commercials, and worked with Rowan Atkinson on American Express adverts.

His main cinema work was:

- Walker (1987) (sound)
- Return of the Jedi (1983) (boom operator)
- Dragonslayer (1981) (production sound assistant)

He was involved in the radio adaptation of Espedair Street, the Iain Banks novel.

When asked to take over as production mixer on Alex Cox's Walker, on location in Nicaragua, Batchelor was only told when collected from the airport that the film was being shot in a war zone. Batchelor said calmly that he would probably need some kind of hat.

Note: This is not the same Dave Batchelor who produced The Sensational Alex Harvey Band or the Oasis song "Slide Away", which appeared on their 1994 debut Definitely Maybe.
