= Dead Air (novel) =

2002 novel by Iain Banks

- First edition cover
- Author: Iain Banks
- Language: English
- Publisher: Little, Brown
- Publication date: 2002
- Publication place: Scotland
- Media type: Print (Hardback & Paperback)
- Pages: 408
- ISBN: 0-316-86055-7
- OCLC: 248896541
- Dewey Decimal: 823/.914 22
- LC Class: PR6052.A485 D43 2002

Dead Air is a Scottish novel by Iain Banks, published in 2002.

== Plot introduction ==
The book revolves around the life of Kenneth Nott, a radio DJ on a London station called Capital Live!

== Plot summary ==
The first person narrative begins on 11 September 2001, and Banks uses the protagonist's conversations — both on the radio and off — to discuss the consequences of the terrorist attacks in the United States on that day. Ken Nott is at a loft party in London at the crucial moment.

The reader hears many of Nott's shock-jock lines ("Guns for nutters only; makes sense.") and sees him described as a sexually promiscuous party animal fuelled by alcohol and other drugs. His politics are left-wing and libertarian, and he rants at every opportunity.

Nott's various girlfriends (including Jo, who does public relations for an indie band called Addicta), his long-suffering radio show colleague Phil, and his black DJ friend Ed are described. Apart from the expected difficulties associated with being a politically controversial radio DJ, everything is going smoothly for Ken until he meets Celia (or "Ceel"), a gangster's wife, whom he falls in love with. An indiscretion with a mobile phone and an answering machine leads him into some difficult and frightening situations.

== Literary significance and criticism ==
The book was not generally well received by critics. While Banks' story-telling skills were acknowledged, some felt that this was less satisfying, in contrast to Look to Windward, his previous book (under the Iain M Banks guise). Like The Business, Dead Air is very topical, with much detailed background on technology and contemporary political issues.

"Major rethink on format after the events of September the eleventh," Phil says, about a delay to a television show they are planning. "What a brilliant excuse that's turned out to be, for so many things." The cover of the novel conjures images of the attack as it shows an old picture of two of the chimneys of London's Battersea Power Station with an aeroplane above them. Critics charged Banks with using the dramatic events of 9/11, and other features of the early 21st century, more as wallpaper than in any meaningful or resonant way.

Critics also felt that Banks did not successfully establish a distance between his own voice and that of the protagonist. Nott's rants are often passionate and articulate; this book was written at the time Banks was building up to cutting up his passport and taking part in the campaign to impeach Tony Blair. Some of these political ideas are developed further in Raw Spirit.

Ken Nott resembles a happier version of Cameron Colley, the main character in Banks' earlier novel Complicity.

== Release details ==
- 2002, UK, Little Brown (ISBN 0-316-86055-7), Pub date ? ? 2002, hardback (First edition)
