= The Algebraist =

2004 science fiction novel by Iain M. Banks

- Author: Iain M. Banks
- Language: English
- Genre: Science fiction novel
- Published: 2004 (Orbit)
- Publication place: Scotland
- Media type: Print (Hardcover & Paperback)
- Pages: 534
- ISBN: 1-84149-155-1
- OCLC: 56645233
- Preceded by: Raw Spirit
- Followed by: The Steep Approach to Garbadale

The Algebraist is a science fiction novel by Scottish writer Iain M. Banks, published in print in 2004. It was nominated for a Hugo Award for Best Novel in 2005.

It was his third science fiction novel not to be based or set in The Culture, the earlier two being Against a Dark Background and Feersum Endjinn.

== Plot summary ==
The novel takes place in 4034. With the assistance of other species, humans have spread across the galaxy, which is primarily ruled by the Mercatoria, a complex feudal hierarchy with a religious zeal to rid the galaxy of artificial intelligences, which were blamed for a previous war.

The central character is the human Fassin Taak, a "Slow Seer" at the Court of the Nasqueron Dwellers. The Nasqueron's star system has been cut off from the rest of Mercatoria civilization because their portal (the only means of faster than light travel) was destroyed by the Beyonders. The Beyonders are a large fleet of space marauders originating from the galaxy's fringes. The local Mercatoria adherents await the delivery of a wormhole connection from a neighbouring system via sub-lightspeed travel.

The Nasqueron Dwellers are an advanced and ancient civilisation of non-humanoids who inhabit gas giants. They lead an almost anarchic existence based on kudos and occupy the majority of gas giant planets in the galaxy. They are the only major species outside the control of the Mercatoria, and they are rumoured to possess devastating defensive weaponry. Dweller societies try not to get involved with "Quick" species: those with sentient beings who experience life at around the speed human beings do. Dwellers are one of the "Slow" species who experience life at a much slower rate. Dweller individuals live for millions of years, and the species has existed for billions of years, long before the foundation of the Mercatoria. Slow Seers like Taak are a dynasty of researchers who attempt to glean information from the Dwellers' vast but disorganised knowledge libraries. They do it partly by artificially slowing their metabolisms to better communicate with the Dwellers.

Taak looks forward to a life of quiet scholarship when he is astonished to be drafted into one of the Mercatoria's religio-military orders. In a previous research expedition to the Dweller-inhabited gas giant Nasqueron, Taak inadvertently uncovered a book containing information about the legendary "Dweller List" of coordinates for their own private systems of wormholes. Since Dwellers are sufficiently long-lived to colonise the galaxy at sublight speed, the very existence of such a network was considered doubtful.

The Dweller List is only a list of star systems. Portals are relatively small and can be anywhere within a system so long as they are at a point of low gravitational gradient, such as a Lagrange point. The list is useless without a particular mathematical transform needed to give the exact location of the portals. Taak must go on a further expedition to Nasqueron to find the Transform.

The Archimandrite Luseferous is a tyrannical warlord of the Starveling Cult. He is in a loose alliance with the Beyonders. He sets out to invade the Ulubis system from the Cluster Epiphany Five Disconnect while also aiming to possess the secrets of the Dweller portals. A Mercatoria counter-attack fleet hurries to defend Ulubis against the Starveling Cult ships and their Beyonder allies. Both fleets are forced to travel at sublight speeds, leaving the inhabitants of the Ulubis system anxiously wondering which will arrive first.

Taak's hunt for the Transform takes him on a journey, partly through the Dweller wormhole network. In a backstory, it is revealed that he has been out of sympathy with the Mercatoria for some time, particularly over their treatment of artificial intelligence, and has been a Beyonder agent. It is also revealed that the Dwellers harbour artificial intelligences from Mercatoria persecution.

The Beyonder/Starveling forces arrive and easily overwhelm Ulubis's native defences. To their dismay, they discover that the counter-attack force is coming much sooner than predicted and is superior. The Beyonder factions despair of locating Taak and the secret in the time available before the recapture of Ulubis and retreat. The Starvelings under Luseferous remain. Luseferous makes a last-ditch attempt to force the Dwellers to yield up Taak, threatening them with antimatter weapons. The Dwellers respond with devastating blows to his fleet. Luseferous flees under the Mercatoria's pursuit.

Taak returns from his journey with his memory partly erased. He can still piece together the secret from the remaining clues: every massive body has a region of zero-net gravitational attraction at its exact centre. The Dwellers have hidden wormhole portals in the cores of all their occupied planets, and the Transform was never necessary. Now that the secret is out, whether the Dwellers will cooperate to allow other species access to their network remains unclear.

The novel ends with Taak, having left Ulubis and joined the Beyonders, suggesting to a lifelong friend he has just discovered is an artificial intelligence, "One day we'll all be free."

== Sequel ==
In an interview in 2004, Banks stated that "It probably could become a trilogy, but for now it’s a standalone novel."

== Reception ==
The Algebraist was shortlisted for the 2005 Hugo Award for Best Novel. In 2011, the novel was short-listed for the NPR Top-100 Science Fiction, Fantasy Titles.

== Release details ==
- First edition hardcover: The Algebraist, Iain M. Banks, London: Orbit, 2004 ISBN 1-84149-155-1 (UK)
- Night Shade Books published the novel in the U.S. in September 2005. (ISBN 1-59780-026-0)
