= Espedair Street =

1987 novel by Iain Banks

- First edition
- Author: Iain Banks
- Cover artist: Philip Mann, ACE design
- Language: English
- Publisher: Macmillan
- Publication date: 1987
- Publication place: Scotland
- Media type: Print (Hardback & Paperback)
- Pages: 249
- ISBN: 0-333-44916-9
- OCLC: 16089335

Espedair Street is a novel by Scottish writer Iain Banks, published in 1987.

== Plot introduction ==
The book tells the (fictional) story of the rise to fame of Dan Weir ('Weird'), a bass guitar player in a rock and roll band called Frozen Gold, and of his struggles to be happy now that he is rich and famous.

== Plot summary ==
Two days ago I decided to kill myself. I would walk and hitch and sail away from this dark city to the bright spaces of the wet west coast, and there throw myself into the tall, glittering seas beyond Iona (with its cargo of mouldering kings) to let the gulls and seals and tides have their way with my remains, and in my dying moments look forward to an encounter with Staffa’s six-sided columns and Fingal's Cave; or I might head south to Corryvreckan, to be spun inside the whirlpool and listen with my waterlogged deaf ears to its mile-wide voice ringing over the wave-race; or be borne north, to where the white sands sing and coral hides, pink-fingered and hard-soft, beneath the ocean swell, and the rampart cliffs climb thousand-foot above the seething acres of milky foam, rainbow-buttressed.

Last night I changed my mind and decided to stay alive. Everything that follows is . . . just to try and explain.

Weird starts out in the Ferguslie Park area of Paisley in a very underprivileged Catholic family. He is impressed by a group named Frozen Gold when he sees them live, in the Union of Paisley College of Technology, and auditions with them. Christine Brice likes his songs, and he joins the band. He ends up writing all their material and playing bass guitar (after trying unsuccessfully to get them to change their name), as the band rises in the drug- and booze-fuelled rock and roll of the 1970s, assisted by A&R man Rick Tumber of ARC Records. In the Three Chimneys tour, singer Davey Balfour takes Dan along on an attempt to break an unofficial (and illegal) speed record for flying around three power station chimneys in Kent in his private aeroplane.

He reminisces about this from 1980s Glasgow, where he lives as a recluse in a Victorian folly (St Jutes), ever since the tragic events which led to the demise of the band. He is posing as his own caretaker, and his friends McCann and Wee Tommy know him as Jimmy Hay. After a memorable fight in a nightclub called 'Monty's', his real identity is revealed. He has grown uncomfortable with fame and wealth, and eventually visits his first girlfriend, Jean Webb, now living in Arisaig.

== Literary significance and criticism ==
The band is loosely modelled on Pink Floyd or Fleetwood Mac, although Banks has said that the character of Weird was in part inspired by Fish, the ex-Marillion singer and lyricist ("When I created Weird [...] I think Fish was at the back of my mind as a wee subliminal influence"). There is a tone of rock journalism in the parts of the book about Frozen Gold. Coincidentally, one-time aspiring rock musician Sandy Robertson, who later became a well-known rock journalist at Sounds magazine, lived in Espedair Street in the early 70s before the book was written.

As Banks' first novel to eschew 'special effects', not being Gothic horror like The Wasp Factory, a literary mystery like Walking on Glass, or science fiction like The Bridge, most critics regard it as one of his most accessible works.

Espedair Street is a street in Charleston, Paisley, where some of the significant events in the book take place.

== Bibliography ==
Espedair Street, Iain Banks, London: Macmillan, 1987, ISBN 0-333-44916-9 (paperback ISBN 0-349-10214-7)

== Adaptation ==
A four-part BBC radio adaptation of the novel was broadcast on BBC Radio 4 in January 1998.
