= Algebraist =

Algebraist may refer to:

- a specialist in algebra.
- The Algebraist, a science fiction novel by Iain M. Banks.
