= Bill Paterson (actor) =

Scottish actor (born 1945)

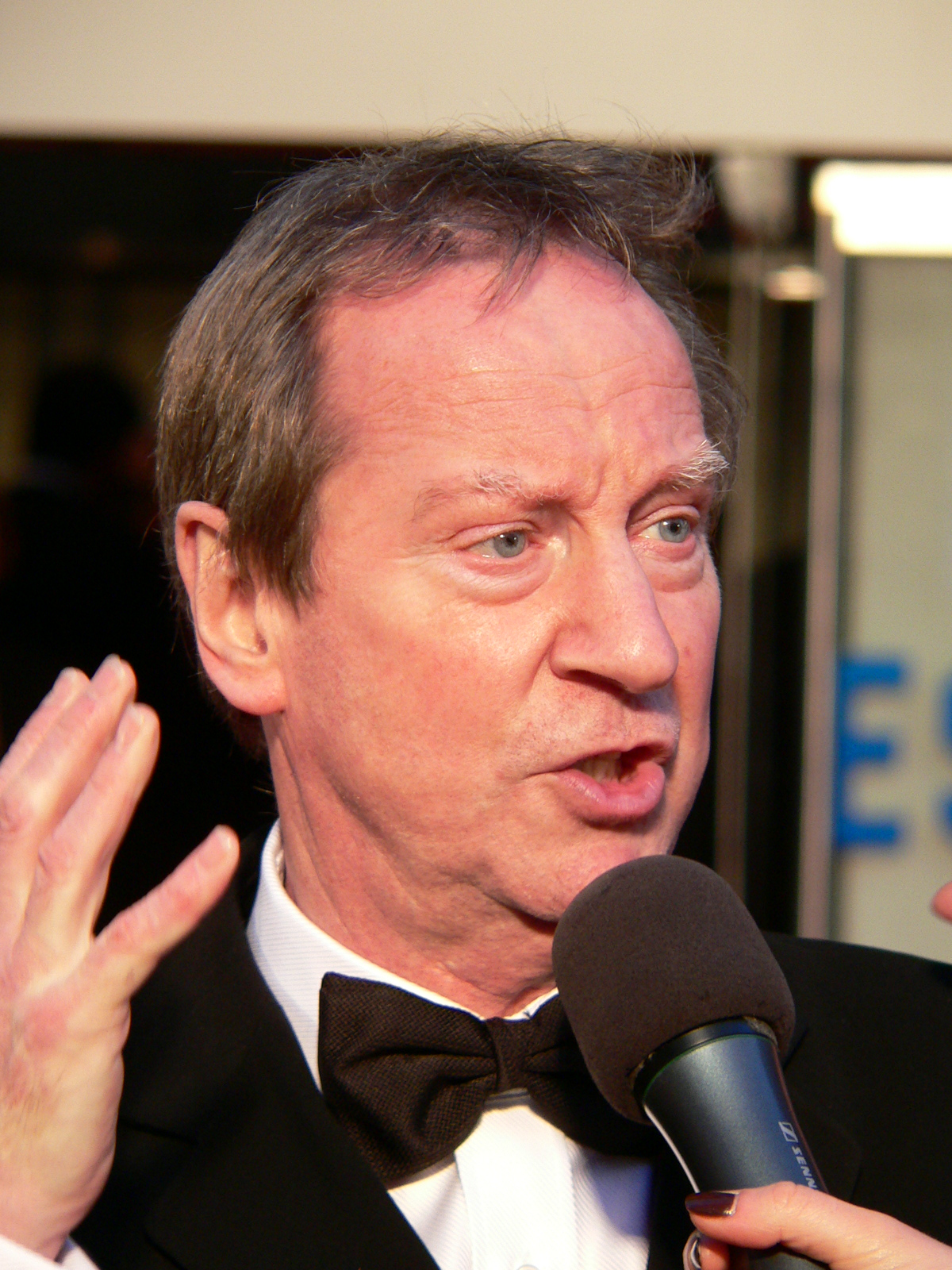
- Paterson in 2006
- Born: William Tulloch Paterson; 3 June 1945 (age 81); Glasgow, Scotland
- Education: Royal Conservatoire of Scotland (BA)
- Occupation: Actor
- Years active: 1967–present
- Spouse: Hildegard Bechtler (m. 1984)
- Children: 2
- Website: billpaterson.co.uk

William Tulloch Paterson (born 3 June 1945) is a Scottish actor. Throughout his career he has appeared regularly in radio drama and provided the narration for a large number of documentaries.

Paterson has appeared in films and television series including Comfort and Joy (1984), Traffik (1989), Auf Wiedersehen, Pet (1986), Truly, Madly, Deeply (1990), The Witches (1990), Wives and Daughters (1999), Sea of Souls (2004–2007), Amazing Grace (2006), Miss Potter (2006), Little Dorrit (2008), Doctor Who (2010), Outlander (2014), Fleabag (2016–2019), Inside No. 9 (2018), Good Omens (2019), Brassic (2020) and House of the Dragon (2022). He is a recipient of the Lifetime Achievement Award of the Scottish BAFTAs.

== Early life ==
William Tulloch Paterson was born in Glasgow on 3 June 1945. Paterson was raised in Dennistoun by his father, a plumber, and his mother, a hairdresser. He states that his interest in acting began with a school trip to the Citizens Theatre in the Gorbals in 1961. After school he pursued a career based on an interest in architecture and spent three years as a quantity surveyor's apprentice before deciding to attend the Royal Scottish Academy of Music and Drama.

== Career ==
=== 1967–1977: Theatre debut and early roles ===
Paterson made his professional acting debut in 1967, appearing alongside Leonard Rossiter in Bertolt Brecht's The Resistible Rise of Arturo Ui at the Glasgow Citizens Theatre. In 1970, Paterson joined the Citizens' Theatre for Youth. He remained there as an actor and assistant director until 1972, when he left to appear with Billy Connolly in the musical comedy The Great Northern Welly Boot Show at the Edinburgh Festival in 1972. Paterson would work with Connolly again, some years later, when he performed in Connolly's play An Me Wi' a Bad Leg Tae. After having seen Paterson perform at the Festival, John McGrath invited him to join his theatre company, 7:84, touring the United Kingdom and Europe with plays such as The Cheviot, the Stag, and the Black Black Oil. He was a founding member of 7:84, and made his London debut in 1976 with the company. He appeared in the Edinburgh Festival and London with John Byrne's first play, Writer's Cramp.

=== 1978–1989: TV and film debuts ===
He first appeared in the West End when he took over the lead role in Whose Life Is It Anyway? at the Savoy Theatre in 1979. Paterson's career began on television as well as the theatre. His first appearances in 1978 were as a police Sergeant of Scotland Yard in The Odd Job and then in BAFTA award winning drama Licking Hitler. He then played King James in the British television serial Will Shakespeare the same year. Paterson would later recall that the biggest regret of his career was in 1978 when he failed to attend an audition for a role in the film Alien. He provided the voice of the Assistant Arcturan Pilot in Episode 7 of the original BBC Radio 4 version of The Hitchhiker's Guide to the Galaxy in 1978. He played Lopakhin in the BBC production of The Cherry Orchard in 1981. Paterson did not entirely neglect the theatre, and in 1982, he was nominated for a Laurence Olivier Award for his performance as Schweyk in another Brecht play, Schweik in the Second World War at the National Theatre. He was in the original National Theatre production of Guys and Dolls (1982).

The early 1980s also saw Paterson beginning to appear in films, including The Killing Fields, Comfort and Joy and A Private Function (all 1984). Other film credits include Dutch Girls (1985) and The Adventures of Baron Munchausen (1987). In television, his extensive and award-winning TV career includes a memorable portrayal of property villain Ally Fraser in series 2 of Auf Wiedersehen, Pet (1986). He also appeared in Smiley's People (1982), The Singing Detective (1986), Traffik (1988).

=== 1990–2009: Career actor ===
Paterson performed in Death and the Maiden at the Royal Court and Duke of York's (1991–92). Other theatre roles in this period include Ivanov at the Almeida, London and Maly Theatre, Moscow (1997).

In 1990, he performed the role of Mr Jenkins, father to a child who gets turned into a mouse in, The Witches (1990). He went on to act in Truly, Madly, Deeply (1990), Chaplin (1992), Sir Ian McKellen's Richard III (1995). In 1997, he appeared as Brian, a cafe owner who knows the Spice Girls, in Spice World. He also performed in The Crow Road (1996), a miniseries from the novel by Iain Banks and Doctor Zhivago (2002).

He later performed in the films Bright Young Things (2003), Miss Potter (2006), How to Lose Friends & Alienate People (2008) and Creation (2009). In television, much of his later work has been for the BBC, starring as Dr Douglas Monaghan in three seasons of the supernatural drama series Sea of Souls (2004–2007). He also played the role of Dr Gibson in the 1999 production of Wives and Daughters, and appeared in the 2008 BBC production of the Charles Dickens novel Little Dorrit as Mr Meagles, as DS Box in the first series of Criminal Justice (2008), and as Dr James Niven in Spanish Flu: The Forgotten Fallen.

Paterson has also narrated for various television and radio programmes. In 2005, he would take a role as Rob McKenna, a lorry driver and unknowing Rain God, in Fits the 19th, 20th, and 22nd of The Hitchhiker's Guide to the Galaxy: Quandary Phase. In 2003, Paterson began broadcasting radio stories about his childhood in Glasgow, Tales From the Back Green on BBC Scotland, which led to them being published by Hodder in 2008 and appearances at many book festivals throughout the UK. He narrated the 2009 BBC TV programme 1929 – The Great Crash which recalled the Wall Street crash of 1929 and compared it to the recent financial turmoil of 2008. From 2009 to 2010, he appeared as George Castle, the head of the CPS in Law & Order: UK. He also played the key role of SIS Chief Percy Alleline in the 2009 BBC Radio 4 version of Tinker Tailor Soldier Spy.

In 2010, Paterson starred in Doctor Who as Professor Edwin Bracewell, in the episode "Victory of the Daleks", with his character making a second appearance in the opening half of the season finale, "The Pandorica Opens". Later in the year, Paterson narrated the BBC Four wildlife documentary Birds Britannia.

=== 2011–2022: TV, film and radio ===
In 2011, Paterson starred in Fast Freddie, The Widow and Me. His most recent theatre is Earthquakes in London at the National Theatre in the summer of 2010. He also narrated the BBC's annual coverage of the Royal Edinburgh Military Tattoo and in 2013 appeared as Adam Smith in The Low Road at the Royal Court.

Paterson played lawyer Ned Gowan in the 2014 Starz period TV series, Outlander. In 2014, Paterson landed a part as Douglas Henshall's father in TV series Shetland. He also narrated "Now Westlin' Winds", originally called "Composed in August" in a recording for Robert Burns 250 years, for the BBC.

In 2015, he starred alongside Brian Cox in a performance of Waiting for Godot at the Royal Lyceum Theatre. In 2015, Paterson was presented with the lifetime achievement of the Scottish BAFTAs.

In 2016, he narrated The Farmers' Country Showdown, a series for the BBC following the agricultural show season and broadcast early in 2017. In 2016, Paterson performed with his friend Simon Callow in The Rebel. He also appeared as the Scottish character Private Frazer in the remake film Dad's Army.

Beginning with the first season in 2016 and ending with the second season in 2019, Paterson played the father of the main character and her sister in the British TV show Fleabag. In 2019, Paterson also performed in the four-part BBC drama Guilt.

In 2022, Paterson performed in the fantasy drama House of the Dragon as the character Lord Lyman Beesbury. He is the narrator of the British TV show The Repair Shop.

== Personal life ==
In 1980, while filming The Lost Tribe, Paterson purchased a holiday home in Fordyce with fellow actor Miriam Margolyes. (Note: The purchase of the house was revealed in Miriam & Alan: Lost in Scotland and Beyond, when Margolyes and Alan Cumming visit Fordyce and are joined by Paterson.)

In 1984, Paterson married German stage designer Hildegard Bechtler. They have a son and daughter. Since leaving Glasgow he has spent much of his life living in London and currently resides in North London near Tufnell Park.

Paterson has published a series of book stories, based on his childhood in Glasgow, entitled Tales From The Back Green.

== Theatre ==
Paterson's theatre roles
Year	Title	Role	Company	Director	Notes
1973	The Cheviot, the Stag and the Black, Black Oil	Various roles	7:84	John McGrath	Musical drama by John McGrath
1988	A Man with Connections	Andrei	Traverse Theatre, Edinburgh	Jenny Killick	Play by Alexander Gelman

== Filmography ==
Year	Title	Role	Notes
1978	The Odd Job	Sergeant Mull	
1982	Scotch Myths	Samuel Johnson / Harry Lauder	written and directed by Murray Grigor and financed by Channel 4
1983	The Ploughman's Lunch	Lecturer	
1984	Comfort and Joy	Alan "Dickie" Bird	written and directed by Bill Forsyth
1984	The Killing Fields	Dr MacEntire	
1984	A Private Function	Morris Wormold the Meat Inspector	
1986	Defence of the Realm	Jack MacLeod	
1987	Friendship's Death	Sullivan	
1987	Coming Up Roses	Mr Valentine	
1988	Hidden City	Anthony	
1988	The Adventures of Baron Munchausen	Henry Salt	
1989	The Return of the Musketeers	Charles I	
1989	The Rachel Papers	Gordon Highway	
1990	The Witches	Mr Herbert Jenkins	
1990	Bearskin: An Urban Fairytale	Jordan	
1990	Truly, Madly, Deeply	Sandy	written and directed by Anthony Minghella
1990	Just Ask for Diamond	Chief Inspector Snape	
1991	The Object of Beauty	Victor Swayle	
1992	Chaplin	Stage Manager	
1995	The Turnaround	James Webb	
1995	Richard III	Sir Richard Ratcliff	
1996	Victory	Captain Davidson	
1997	Spice World	Brian	
1998	Hilary and Jackie	Cello Teacher	
1999	Chrono-Perambulator	Professor Teddy Knox	Short film
1999	Heart	Mr Kreitman	
1999	The Match	Tommy	
1999	Sunshine	Minister of Justice	
2000	Complicity	Wallace Byatt	
2005	Kingdom of Heaven	Bishop	Director's cut only
2005	Rag Tale	Lucky Lloyd	
2006	Amazing Grace	Henry Dundas	
2006	Miss Potter	Rupert Potter	
2009	Creation	Dr Gully	
2009	Into the Storm	Clement Attlee	
2010	The Gruffalo	The Gruffalo (voice)	Short film, Gaelic version
2015	The Vote	Simon Weatherstone	
2016	Dad's Army	Private Frazer	Film adaptation of original BBC sitcom
2017	The Man Who Invented Christmas	Mr Grimsby	
2020	Rebecca	Dr Baker	
2025	The House Was Not Hungry Then	Dad (voice)	

== Television ==
Year	Title	Role	Notes
1974-1983	Play for Today	Various	5 episodes, including The Cheviot, the Stag and the Black, Black Oil and Licking Hitler
1976	The Flight of the Heron	Sergeant	1 episode
1977	Backs to the Land	Forbes	Episode: "We Shall Fight Them on the Beaches"
1978	ITV Playhouse	Gary	Episode: "Cold Harbour"
1978	Will Shakespeare	King James I	Episode: "The Living Record"
1978	BBC2 Playhouse	Girling	Episode: "The Vanishing Army"
1979	One Fine Day	Second Man in Lift	TV Film
1979	Telford's Change	Kevin	Episode: "Winners Take All"
1979	Scottish Playbill	Cannavan	Episode: "Extra Mural Study"
1979–1981	Crown Court	Dr Rutherford	2 episodes
1980	The Lost Tribe	Moshe Kaydan	5 episodes
1981	The Cherry Orchard	Lopakhin	TV Film
1982	Smiley's People	Lauder Strickland	4 episodes
1983	One of Ourselves	Mr Daly	TV film
1984	Scotland's Story	David Kirkwood/Thomas Muir	2 episodes
1985	Dutch Girls	Mole	TV Film
1986	Auf Wiedersehen, Pet	Ally Fraser	13 episodes
1986	God's Chosen Car Park	Victor Rosen	TV Film
1986	The Singing Detective	Dr Gibbon	4 episodes
1987	Screenplay	Colin/Det. Sup. Chase	2 episodes
1988	The Modern World: Ten Great Writers	Titorelli	Episode: "Franz Kafka's The Trial"
1989	Traffik	Jack Lithgow	Miniseries
1989	Boon	Peter Mortan	Episode: "Arms and the Dog"
1990	God on the Rocks	Mr Marsh	TV Film
1990	The Play on One	Alex McPherson	Episode: Yellowbacks
1991	Shrinks	Matt Hennessey	Miniseries
1991	Murder Most Horrid	Chief Inspector	Episode: "The Case of the Missing"
1992	Tell Tale Hearts	Anthony Steadman	3 episodes
1993	In Dreams	Dr Gold	TV Film
1993	Screen One	PC Howard Mullen	Episode: "Wall of Silence"
1994	Hard Times	Stephen Blackpool	4 episodes
1995	Jackanory	Storyteller	Episode: The Dreamfighter and Other Creation Tales
1995	Oliver's Travels	Baxter	4 episodes
1995	The Ghostbusters of East Finchley	Mr Small	TV Film
1995	Sharman	James Webb	Pilot
1996	The Writing on the Wall	Bull	TV film
1996	The Crow Road	Kenneth McHoan	4 episodes
1997	Melissa	DCI Cameron	4 episodes
1997	Mr. White Goes to Westminster	Ben White	TV Film
1998	Out of Sight	Marcus Mildew	Episode: "Appearances Can Be Deceptive"
1998	Oi! Get Off Our Train	Walrus (Voice)	Television Short
1999	Wives and Daughters	Mr Gibson	4 episodes
2000	The Secret Adventures of Jules Verne	Sir Nicol McLean	Episode: "The Victorian Candidate"
2002	Doctor Zhivago	Alexander Gromyko	2 episodes
2004	Foyle's War	Patrick Jamieson	Episode: "Enemy Fire"
2004–2005	Shoebox Zoo	Narrator	
2004–2006	Sea of Souls	Dr Douglas Monaghan	
2008	Little Dorrit	Mr Meagles	9 episodes
2009–2011	Law & Order: UK	George Castle	26 episodes
2010	Doctor Who	Professor Edwin Bracewell	Episodes: "Victory of the Daleks" and "The Pandorica Opens"
2010	Agatha Christie's Marple	Mr Bradley	Episode: "The Pale Horse"
2011	The Man Who Crossed Hitler	Kurt Ohnesorge	TV Movie
2011	Fast Freddie, The Widow and Me	Judge	TV Movie
2012	Dirk Gently	Professor Jericho	1 episode
2012	Falcón	Ignacio Ortega	Episode: "The Silent and the Damned"
2014	37 Days	Lord Morley	3 episodes
2014–2015; 2017	Outlander	Ned Gowan	TV series; Main role; 8 episodes (Seasons 1 & 3)
2014	Shetland	James Perez	Episode: "Blue Lightning" (Parts 1 & 2)
2016–2017	The Rebel	Charles	9 episodes
2016	Churchill's Secret	Lord Moran	TV Film
2016–2019	Fleabag	Dad	9 episodes
2018, 2024	Inside No. 9	Party Guest/Mr Green	2 episodes
2019	Good Omens	R.P. Tyler	3 episodes
2019	Guilt	Roy Lynch	2 episodes
2020	Brassic	Tom Tillerton	2 episodes
2021	Ted Lasso	Richard Cole (voice) (uncredited)	Episode: "Do the Right-est Thing"
2022	The Sandman	Dr John Hathaway	Episode: "Sleep of the Just"
2022	House of the Dragon	Lyman Beesbury	8 episodes
2024	Halo	Ackerson's Father	Episode: "Visegrad"
TBA	Tomb Raider	Winston	Filming
