= The Crow Road (TV series) =

- DVD cover
- Genre: Drama
- Based on: The Crow Road by Iain Banks
- Written by: Bryan Elsley
- Directed by: Gavin Millar
- Starring: Joe McFadden; Bill Paterson; Peter Capaldi; Valerie Edmond; Dougray Scott
- Composer: Colin Towns
- Country of origin: United Kingdom
- Original language: English
- No. of series: 1
- No. of episodes: 4

Production
- Executive producers: Andrea Calderwood; Kevin Loader; Franc Roddam
- Producer: Bradley Adams
- Production locations: Ardkinglas House, Cairndow, Argyll and Bute, Scotland, United Kingdom
- Cinematography: John Else
- Running time: 58 min
- Production company: Union Pictures

Original release
- Network: BBC Scotland; BBC 2
- Release: 4 November – 25 November 1996

The Crow Road is a four-part television serial by BBC Scotland in 1996, based faithfully on the 1992 novel of the same name by Scottish novelist Iain Banks. It was directed by Gavin Millar.

== Summary ==
The cast includes Joseph McFadden as Prentice McHoan, Bill Paterson as his father, Dougray Scott as his older brother (another, younger brother in the novel has been written out here) and Peter Capaldi as his missing uncle Rory, who — by a narrative device employed in the adaptation — visits the thoughtful Prentice when he is alone. The production was nominated as Best Drama Serial at the 1997 British Academy Television Awards. Following the success of this TV serial, the same team went on to adapt Banks's Complicity as a feature film.

== Cast ==
- Joseph McFadden as Prentice McHoan
- Bill Paterson as Kenneth McHoan
- Peter Capaldi as Rory McHoan
- Valerie Edmond as Ashley Watt
- Dougray Scott as Lewis McHoan
- David Robb as Fergus Urvill
- Elizabeth Sinclair as Mary McHoan
- Gudrun Ure as Margot McHoan
- Patricia Kerrigan as Janice
- Simone Bendix as Verity Walker
- Paul Young as Hamish McHoan
- Stella Gonet as Fiona Urvill
- Claire Nielson as Antonia McHoan
- Edward Casey as Young Prentice McHoan

== Critical reception ==
Reviewing the DVD box set in 2015, The Guardian wrote "the best TV adaptations capture the spirit of the original while adding something of their own – and The Crow Road, which first aired almost 20 years ago, is one of the finest adaptations of them all, managing to distil Banks’s complex tale into four hours of sharply evocative TV."

== Episodes ==
No.	Title	Directed by	Written by	Original release date
1	"Prentice"	Gavin Millar	Bryan Elsley	4 November 1996
Prentice returns home from university for his grandmother's funeral where he meets old friends and relatives. He takes it upon himself to find out more about his uncle Rory's disappearance six years ago.
2	"Kenneth"	Gavin Millar	Bryan Elsley	11 November 1996
After drunkenly making a fool of himself at his Uncle Fergus' New Year's Eve party, Prentice has a talk with his father. His father sheds a little light on Rory's disappearance, but the father and son relationship sours once again.
3	"Fergus"	Gavin Millar	Bryan Elsley	18 November 1996
Prentice learns more about the past when he finds old floppy disks containing portions of the book Rory was writing. Meanwhile, Rory continues to haunt him whenever he's alone.
4	"Rory"	Gavin Millar	Bryan Elsley	25 November 1996
Prentice gradually begins to close on the truth behind Rory's disappearance. But will his discovery only sour his feelings for his beloved uncle?
