= Charleston, Paisley =

District in Paisley, Renfrewshire, Scotland

Coordinates: 55°49′58″N 4°25′00″W

Charleston is a district in the burgh of Paisley in Renfrewshire, Scotland. Once a village distinct from Paisley, Charleston has become absorbed as Paisley has expanded, in particular by housing developments in Lochfield and Glenburn.

Until the 1990s, Charleston was a mixed area of housing and industry. However, the closure of several factories and the development of their sites for modern housing, has significantly changed the character of the area.

Housing on Neilston Road, Stock Street and Espedair Street provide typical examples of Scottish tenement flats. Three to four storeys tall, with shops on the ground floor and constructed of local blond sandstone, these tenement flats have been extensively restored and modernised since the 1980s.

The Iain Banks novel, Espedair Street, takes its name from the street in Charleston and is partly set in the district.

Locally the area is nicknamed "Kentucky".
