= David Batchelor =

David Batchelor may refer to:

- David Batchelor (artist and writer) (born 1955), Scottish artist and writer
- David Batchelor (sound mixer) (1941–2005), English sound mixer in television adverts
