= Complicity (film) =

- Directed by: Gavin Millar
- Screenplay by: Bryan Elsley
- Based on: novel Complicity by Iain Banks
- Produced by: Richard Jackson; Neil Dunn
- Starring: Jonny Lee Miller; Brian Cox
- Cinematography: David Odd
- Edited by: Angus Newton
- Music by: Colin Towns
- Production companies: Talisman Films; Carlton Films
- Release date: 10 July 2000 (UK)
- Running time: 99 minutes
- Country: United Kingdom
- Language: English

Complicity (or Retribution in the US market) is a 2000 film based on the 1993 novel Complicity by Iain Banks. The screenplay was written by Bryan Elsley, and directed by Gavin Millar. Both had previously adapted Banks's The Crow Road into a TV serial. The film marked the acting debut of Richard Madden.

== Plot ==
Idealistic Scottish journalist Cameron Colley writes articles exposing establishment corruption. When some of those named in his articles are found brutally murdered, suspicion falls on him; and he is forced to begin an investigation to clear his name.

== Cast ==
- Jonny Lee Miller as Cameron Colley
- Brian Cox as Inspector McDunn
- Keeley Hawes as Yvonne
- Paul Higgins as Andy
- Jason Hetherington as William
- Bill Paterson as Wallace Byatt
- Samuel West as Neil
- Laura Ellis as McCormack's mistress
- Alan Sinclair as Sir Toby McCormack
- Alex Norton as Kenny Garnet
- Valerie Edmond as Josephine Boyle
- Paul Young as Frank
- Katy Hale as Librarian
- Alex Purves as Persimmon
- Rachael Stirling as Claire
- John Murtagh as Norrie
- Michael MacKenzie as Baine
- Julie Austin as Distillery secretary
- Stephen McCole as Al
- David Kerr as Young Cameron
- Richard Madden as Young Andy
- Stephanie Boyle as Young Yvonne
- Laura O'Donnell as Young Claire
- Jackie Farrell as Security Man
- Andy Gray as D.S. Flavell
- Graham De Banzie as Archie McLeod
- Gary McCormack as Howie
- David Gallacher as Country Policeman
- Joseph Accerelli as Azul
- Gordon Munro as Interrogator 1
- Ford Kiernan as Interrogator 2
- William McBain as Molester
- Carter Ferguson as Armed policeman
- Lucy McLellan as Policewoman
- Brian Hamilton as Prison guard

== Locations ==
Scenes were filmed in Edinburgh and the Firth of Forth (particularly Inverkeithing, South Queensferry, and Inchmickery), and in Dunning, Glenturret, Kippen, Lochgoilhead, Lochailort, Glen Coe, and on Rannoch Moor. One scene from the film was set in the Snaffle Bit bar in Sauchiehall Street, Glasgow, where actual bar staff and customers were used.

== Critical reception ==
Time Out wrote, "It says a lot about the British film industry that dross like Rancid Aluminium commands a wide theatrical release, while this sensitively judged adaptation of Iain Banks' best novel goes straight to video...although it packs a little too much into its 99 minutes, it has clearly been made with love, as well as respect for the source material". Ian Nathan of Empire awarded it three stars out of five, saying "the sombre mood fits perfectly, Miller is good, and on the whole this is nasty enough to provoke. But it also offers nothing new. It is far too tentative in the violence department and therefore doesn't hang around long in the memory." He concluded that it was "low-key but not uninteresting." Lorien Haynes of Radio Times awarded it one star out of five, stating "You'd be better off going back to Iain Banks's original novel than waste your time with this convoluted and unsatisfactory adaptation." Haynes regarded Jonny Lee Miller as "endlessly bland", director Gavin Millar "all at sea" and the "excellent" Keeley Hawes as "wasted".
