= No Job for a Lady =

British TV sitcom (1990–1992)

- Genre: Sitcom
- Created by: Alex Shearer
- Starring: Penelope Keith; Mark Kingston; Garfield Morgan; Paul Young; George Baker
- Country of origin: United Kingdom
- Original language: English
- No. of series: 3
- No. of episodes: 18

Production
- Producer: John Howard Davies
- Running time: 30 minutes (including commercials)
- Production company: Thames Television

Original release
- Network: ITV
- Release: 7 February 1990 – 10 February 1992

No Job for a Lady is a British sitcom that aired on ITV between 7 February 1990 and 10 February 1992. Starring Penelope Keith, it was written by Alex Shearer, and directed and produced by John Howard Davies. It was made by Thames Television for ITV.

== Cast ==
- Penelope Keith – Jean Price MP
- Mark Kingston – Geoff Price
- Garfield Morgan – Norman (Whip)
- Paul Young – Ken Miller
- George Baker – Sir Godfrey Eagan MP (series 1 and 2)
- Brogden Miller – Freddy
- Nigel Humphreys – Harry
- Jonathan Dow – Tim (series 1)
- Paul Rattigan – Mark (series 2)
- Michael Cochrane – Richard (series 3)

Note: In the four Series One episodes in which Nigel Humphreys appeared, he was credited as Nigel Humphries.

== Plot ==
No Job for a Lady revolves around Jean Price, the newly elected, somewhat rebellious Labour MP for an inner-city constituency, and her life in the House of Commons. She is married to Geoff Price, who is a public defender and takes care of many of the household chores so that Jean pursue her new career. The show follows Jean while she balances her personal life with parliamentary duties, including "woman's issues," which Jean alternately fights for and is frustrated by, as other MPs think she cares about nothing else because she is a woman. She often is surprised by other MPs' duplicity and hypocrisy, holding them to a higher standard.

The Commons' chamber is never seen, with scenes alternating between Jean's office, which she shares with her Scottish colleague Ken Miller, the lobby, and various lounges of Westminster. Other characters include the whip Norman, and the Conservative MP Sir Godfrey Eagan, various visiting constituents, and Jean's secretary, Marc.

== Episodes ==
=== Series 1 (1990) ===
1. "Who goes Home?" (7 February 1990) - 14.39 million viewers
2. "The Maiden Over" (14 February 1990)
3. "There should be a law against it!" (21 February 1990)
4. "Questions, Questions!" (28 February 1990)
5. "A member of the Committee" (7 March 1990)
6. "Take a Copy!" (14 March 1990)

=== Series 2 (1991) ===
1. "Strange Bedfellows" (7 January 1991)
2. "But I voted for you!" (14 January 1991)
3. "White Knights" (21 January 1991)
4. "Poetic Justice" (28 January 1991)
5. "Undesirable Aliens" (4 February 1991)
6. "No rumour in the Truth" (11 February 1991)

=== Series 3 (1992) ===
1. "Hawks and Doves" (6 January 1992)
2. "A bed for the night" (13 January 1992)
3. "Sugar and Spice" (20 January 1992)
4. "I'd like to see you do it!" (27 January 1992)
5. "What Care? What Compensation?" (3 February 1992)
6. "Lobby Terms" (10 February 1992)

== DVD release ==
All three complete series of No Job for a Lady have been released on DVD by Network, with a 3-disc set released by Acorn Media in 2012.

DVD	Release date
The Complete Series 1	26 July 2010
The Complete Series 2	25 July 2011
The Complete Series 3	4 June 2012
The Complete Collection	2020
