= Against a Dark Background =

1993 science fiction novel by Iain M. Banks

- Author: Iain M. Banks
- Language: English
- Genre: Science fiction
- Publisher: Orbit Books
- Publication date: 1993
- Publication place: United Kingdom
- Media type: Print (Hardback & Paperback)
- Pages: 487
- ISBN: 1-85723-179-1
- OCLC: 32014520
- Preceded by: The Crow Road
- Followed by: Complicity

Against a Dark Background is a science fiction novel by Scottish writer Iain M. Banks, first published in 1993. It was his first science fiction novel not to feature, or be set in, the Culture.

== Plot summary ==
The main protagonist is Lady Sharrow, a former military pilot and antiquities thief. She lives on Golter, a planet orbiting a star in an isolated planetary system with no nearby galaxies. A cult named the Huhsz is granted permission to assassinate her, believing that their messiah can not be born until the end of her family's female bloodline. She is forced to choose between going into hiding for a year or recovering the last Lazy Gun, an ancient weapon of mass destruction that was stolen from the cult by her ancestor.

Sharrow resolves to recover the Lazy Gun, rejecting an offer of help from her cousin Geis, a wealthy industrialist and businessman. In order to do this, she must first find the Universal Principles, a long lost book rumoured to contain a clue to the Gun's hiding place. She visits her half-sister Breyghun who is held prisoner in the Seahouse, a monastery run by the Sad Brothers. Breyghun tells her that their grandfather Gorko, a collector of rare artefacts, encoded information regarding the location of the Universal Principles into the DNA of his servants. Sharrow recruits the surviving members of her combat unit and sets out to make contact with the son of Gorko's butler. During these events, Sharrow is menaced by two unidentified bald-headed clones, who have the ability to inflict pain on her via a military virus embedded in her nervous system. They demand the Gun be turned over to them and not the Huhsz.

Sharrow and her team follow the trail left by Gorko and recover the Universal Principles. The book has long since turned to dust, but the case contains a quotation that is also inscribed on Gorko's tomb. Sharrow visits the storage facility where the tomb is kept and finds a device that provides them with co-ordinates deep in an embargoed zone. The team are joined by an android named Feril and set out to retrieve the Lazy Gun. After disembarking from the submarine they hired, they are attacked first by air and ground troops. During these encounters, her team are killed one by one and Sharrow is wounded. Sharrow and Feril reach a small tower which contains both the Gun and numerous other pieces of ancient technology. After leaving the tower, Sharrow is immobilised by a neural weapon and the clones appear, confiscate the Gun and take them both prisoner.

They are conveyed to a desert stronghold and are presented to a man named Molgarin, who claims to be immortal. The fortress is attacked, by both the Huhsz and another unidentified set of troops. In the chaos, Sharrow kills the clones and escapes using a monowheeled tank that was found along with the Lazy Gun. She realizes that the first force contained members of the Sad Brothers and she and Feril head for the Seahouse, taking the Lazy Gun with them. They arrive and discover that her cousin Geis has been behind events, acting out of an unrequited love for Sharrow and a desire to engineer political change within the system. Molgarin was an actor employed to try and make Sharrow feel gratitude towards Geis. After they are taken captive Sharrow and Feril cause the Lazy Gun to begin firing uncontrollably and the Seahouse is destroyed, with Feril still inside it. In the confusion, Sharrow kills first her half-sister Breyghun and then Geis, before leaving in the tank, self-identifying with the Lazy Gun and the destruction that it brings to everything it encounters.

=== Lazy Guns ===
The eight Lazy Guns were mysterious ancient objects, discovered together a long time before the events of the book. A Lazy Gun is roughly half a metre long, 30 cm wide and 20 cm tall. The Lazy Gun is "light but massy", and weighs three times as much when turned upside down. The Lazy Gun is the only weapon known to display a sense of humour. When fired, some calamity or cataclysm will befall the target on whatever scale is necessary to assure its destruction. The effect is random and in no way limited by its own implausibility, ranging from (for example) an inexplicable wild animal attack in the case of humans to a spontaneous cometary impact in the case of a city.

In addition to being susceptible to ordinary damage, tampering with the Guns usually results in a mundane but profoundly powerful explosion that destroys the gun and everything in the vicinity. Only one of the original eight guns survives. The seventh, also found by the Lady Sharrow before the events of the book, was destroyed by the university it was sold to when they tampered with it. The resulting explosion devastated the city the university was located in. Sharrow still carries the guilt of this catastrophe.

== History ==
Against a Dark Background was rewritten from an original work of 1975. Banks said that it was the last of his old material that he had to rewrite.

Banks wrote an epilogue to the book that did not appear with the published text, but is available separately online.

== Bibliography ==
Banks, Iain M. (1993), Against a Dark Background, London: Orbit, ISBN 1-85723-179-1.
