= The Cherry Orchard (disambiguation) =

The Cherry Orchard is a play by Anton Chekhov.

The Cherry Orchard may also refer to several works based on the play:

- The Cherry Orchard (1973 film), Australian TV film starring Googie Withers
- The Cherry Orchard (1981 film), British TV film starring Judi Dench
- Sakura no Sono, a Japanese manga series adapted into a 1990 film released with the English title The Cherry Orchard
- The Cherry Orchard (1999 film), international co-production starring Charlotte Rampling
