= My Fragile Heart =

- Genre: Crime drama
- Written by: Abi Morgan
- Directed by: Gavin Millar
- Starring: Sarah Lancashire; Lorcan Cranitch; John McArdle; Anne Stallybrass; Lynda Rooke; Robert Glenister; Sarah Price; Eva Pope
- Composer: Colin Towns
- Country of origin: United Kingdom
- Original language: English
- No. of series: 1
- No. of episodes: 2

Production
- Executive producer: Greg Brenman
- Producer: Rebecca De Souza
- Cinematography: Nigel Walters
- Editor: Ian Farr
- Running time: 90 minutes
- Production company: Tiger Aspect Productions

Original release
- Network: ITV
- Release: 17 September – 18 September 2000

My Fragile Heart is a two-part British television crime drama miniseries, written by Abi Morgan, that first broadcast on ITV on 17 September 2000. The series starred Sarah Lancashire as Trina Lavery, a young woman who returns to her childhood home to look after her terminally ill mother, only to find the man accused of the murder of her best friend several years ago living nearby. The series was directed by Gavin Millar, with Rebecca De Souza acting as producer.

The first episode gathered 9.82 million viewers. Episode two dipped slightly; gathering 9.58 million. The series was sold abroad, with both episodes combined into a single film, running at 146 minutes (minus adverts). The series was later released on VHS, exclusively via WHSmith stores. This remains the only home video release to date.

== Plot ==
Trina Lavery (Sarah Lancashire) returns to her hometown of Stoke-on-Trent after 20 years, there to look after her ailing mother. Upon her arrival, Trina discovers that Bernard Cleve (Lorcan Cranitch), the man who was arrested for the murder of her best friend some years ago, is also living in Stoke, his case having been tossed out of court. Though a free man in the eyes of the law, Bernard is unable to escape suspicion when another local girl is killed. This time around, however, Trina has a feeling that Bernard was not responsible – and in setting out to prove her theory, she risks becoming victim number three.

== Reception ==
The Guardian said of the first episode; "Adultery on a bed of sofa cushions, burgeoning teenage sexuality in the woods and a shortage of ice in the home of Trina's alcoholic mum (she took to using frozen peas instead), these are not recognisable traits of cosy Sunday night television. All of which made My Fragile Heart both topical and, more importantly, excellent drama."

== Cast ==
- Sarah Lancashire as Trina Lavery
- Lorcan Cranitch as Bernard Cleve
- John McArdle as Roy Lavery
- Anne Stallybrass as Sandra Park
- Lynda Rooke as Maureen 'Mo' Blake
- Robert Glenister as Stephen 'Squeal' Blake
- Sarah Price as Becca Blake
- Eva Pope as Ruby Mason
- Kate Richards as Katya Mason
- James Peachey as Andrew Mason
- Caroline Strong as Claire Macavoy
- Nicholas Gleaves as Joe Macavoy
- Kelly Thresher as Shannon Macavoy
- Sue Norville as Aileen Murray
- David Westhead as DCI Peter Murray
- Paul Young as DCI Owen Simmons
- James Higginson as DI Richard Marks
- Geoff Holman as Freddie Gibbs
