= Whit (novel) =

1995 novel by Iain Banks

- First edition
- Author: Iain Banks
- Language: English
- Publisher: Little, Brown
- Publication date: 1995
- Publication place: Scotland
- Media type: Print (Hardback & Paperback)
- Pages: 455
- ISBN: 0-349-10768-8
- OCLC: 35666889

Whit, or, Isis amongst the unsaved is a novel by the Scottish writer Iain Banks, published in 1995. Isis Whit, a young but important member of a small, quirky cult in Scotland, narrates. The community suspects that Isis' cousin Morag is in danger, and sends Isis out to help.

== Plot summary ==
Isis, otherwise The Blessed Very Reverend Gaia-Marie Isis Saraswati Minerva Mirza Whit of Luskentyre, Beloved Elect of God III, is the 19-year-old granddaughter and designated spiritual heir of Salvador Whit, patriarch of the Luskentyrians. They are a religious cult who live in a commune in Stirlingshire and reject most technology. They run their lives according to a collection of beliefs and rituals "revealed" to Salvador after he washed ashore on Harris in the Western Isles and "married" two young Asian ladies (Aasni and Zhobelia Asis). (Haggis pakora becomes a staple of the cult's cuisine.)

The novel opens shortly before the Luskentyrian Festival of Love, held every four years, about nine months before every leap year day (29 February). The Luskentyrians believe that those born on that day have special power. This includes Isis herself, Elect of God, and expected to take over leadership of the cult.

The bulk of the novel tells of Isis' voyages in the world of "the Unsaved" (also known as "the Obtuse", "the Wretched", "the Bland" and "the Asleep"), through Scotland and southern England in search of Morag, who is feared to have rejected the cult.

While searching for her cousin, Isis meets Rastas, policemen, white power skinheads, and other characters of a sort she has never encountered before, and tells the story of the cult and the rationale behind its rules. Isis' maternal grandmother, Yolanda, a feisty Texan woman, appears and lends her support to Isis' quest. Isis' friend Sophi, although not part of the cult, is very close to her. Isis meets her whenever she goes to her house to use the Luskentyrian method of free (if laborious) telephone communication, using coded rings.

Returning with enhanced maturity and a lot more information, Isis must decide what to tell the other members of the cult.

== Literary significance and criticism ==
Like many of Banks' characters, from Frank Cauldhame in The Wasp Factory to Prentice McHoan in The Crow Road, Isis engages in a half-unconscious search for knowledge which will inevitably turn her world upside down. The novel thus becomes a type of Bildungsroman.

Banks portrays the cult largely sympathetically, especially given its publication shortly after the Waco Siege in 1993 (which Yolanda discusses within the novel). Banks ensures that the Luskentyrian theology (in which Isis fervently believes at the start of the book) has coherence and consistency, even as events cause her to start to doubt.

Banks has called it:

a book about religion and culture written by a dedicated evangelical atheist – I thought I was very kind to them... Essentially, Isis makes the recognition that the value of the Luskentyrian cult is in their community values rather than their religious ones. She recognises that efficiency isn't everything, that people not profit are what matters.

== Bibliography ==
- Whit, Iain Banks, London : Abacus, 1995, ISBN 0-349-10768-8
