= My Friend Walter =

British 1988 children's novel

- First edition cover
- Author: Michael Morpurgo
- Language: English
- Genre: Children's novel
- Publisher: William Heinemann
- Publication date: 1988
- Publication place: United Kingdom
- Media type: Print
- Pages: 156
- ISBN: 0-434-95203-6

My Friend Walter is a children's fiction novel by Michael Morpurgo. It was first published in Great Britain by William Heinemann in 1988. The book was shortlisted for the 1989 Smarties Prize.

== Plot ==
This book follows a girl called Bess who goes to a family reunion. She meets a stranger who tells her to visit the Bloody Tower, in London. Bess sees Sir Walter Raleigh in London and Walter asks Bess if he can come and live on her estate.

Living with a ghost can have its difficulties, I discovered, even if he is your friend. Remember Sir Walter Raleigh who laid his cloak in a puddle so Queen Elizabeth the first could walk across? Well, Bess meets his ghost and finds out he's her ancestor! How will Bess explain Sir Walter to her family? Especially when he breaks her brothers fishing rod, steals a horse and smokes cigars in her room!

== Reviews ==
In their review of the audiobook, the School Library Journal said the narrator Barbara Ewing "has a pleasant voice and her easy-to-understand British accent will expand the listening skills of youngsters". They also noted that the novel has a "fast-moving plot that contains touches of humor, and a smattering of history that should pique interest in Sir Walter Raleigh".

== Film adaption ==
The novel was adapted into a television movie in 1992. It was shown in two parts between 24 April and 1 May 1992 as part of ITV's CITV strand. It was directed by Gavin Millar, and starred Polly Grant as Bess Throckmorton and Ronald Pickup as Sir Walter Raleigh. British producer Eric Abraham said "we had to make this film in the most cost effective way possible and I'm afraid it shows"; the budget for the film was £750,000. Steve Clarke said in his review that "it might not be the stuff of Bafta awards, but the film is a refreshing glimpse of good, narrative children's television with a convincing contemporary setting, this is not short-attention-span television and there isn't a computer graphic or game in sight".

Sue-Ellen Beauregard wrote in Booklist that "the pace of this pleasing drama picks up when Walter intervenes to help Bess' grandmother recover from a heart attack, pinpoint the identities of local cattle rustlers, and intercede when Bess' family loses their farm due to financial difficulties. Beautiful vistas of the British countryside and special effects involving Sir Walter's ability to disappear as well as to frighten local rapscallions add to the lure of this top-notch film". It also aired on PBS on 21 November 1993.
