= The Quarry (Banks novel) =

Posthumous novel by Iain Banks

- Author: Iain Banks
- Language: English
- Publisher: Little, Brown
- Publication date: 2013
- Publication place: Scotland
- Media type: Print (Hardback)
- Pages: 336 pp
- ISBN: 978-1-4087-0394-6

The Quarry is Iain Banks's final novel, published posthumously in late June 2013. The novel deals with an autistic youth, Kit, and his father, Guy, a misanthrope dying of cancer.

The author, who died on 9 June 2013, was in the advanced stages of terminal gall bladder cancer when the book was being prepared for publication, although he was unaware of his condition until the book was almost complete. He subsequently incorporated his personal experiences with the disease in the novel. At Banks's request, the publication dates for The Quarry were expedited to 20 June 2013 in the UK and 25 June 2013 in the US. The Scotsman reviewer Hannah McGill, reflecting on Banks's condition at the time of writing, described the book as "a state-of-the-self book, a meaning-of-life book".
