= A Song of Stone =

1997 novel by Iain Banks

- First edition
- Author: Iain Banks
- Language: English
- Publisher: Abacus
- Publication date: 1997
- Publication place: Scotland
- Media type: Print (Hardback & Paperback)
- Pages: 280 pp
- ISBN: 0-349-11011-5
- OCLC: 60211679

A Song of Stone is a novel by Scottish writer Iain Banks, published in 1997.

== Plot summary ==
Abel and Morgan, an aristocratic couple, live in a small castle in an indeterminate place and time of civil war. They decide to abandon their home and join a trek of refugees seeking safety. A group of irregulars, led by a woman called "The Lieutenant" (or "Loot"), stops them and takes them back to the castle, which the irregulars fortify as a base. They loot the castle, and Morgan is seduced by the Lieutenant. A rival faction attacks the castle with artillery and Abel is taken along with the fighters on a counter-attack. When they return, Abel almost shoots the Lieutenant and there is a violent and nihilistic ending.

A Song of Stone tells the frightening story of what happens when the normal rules of society break down. Themes of decadence, violence and war are intertwined with the lives of the rather pompous but lyrical disgraced aristocrat Abel, his partner Morgan, the ruthless Lieutenant and her soldiers with names like "Psycho", "Karma" and "Deathwish".

The story is told by Abel, an unreliable narrator. Abel describes Morgan's actions in the second person, mostly when she is in his direct view.

As the invaders systematically loot and destroy Abel's family's ancestral home, Abel seems ambivalent to what is happening. Later, when the Lieutenant suggests a memorial for Abel's lifelong family retainer, who has just been killed, Abel and the reader realise that he does not know the servant's surname.

The violence of war is described graphically.

== Trivia ==
Banks has acknowledged his admiration for J. G. Ballard, which shows in this book.

Banks incorporated some previous work about the four medieval elements, and associated them with the four major characters in the book: fire with the Lieutenant, water with the noble, air with the noble's sister, earth with the castle.

The book was originally to have been called Feu de Joie, a reference to the custom of firing live rounds into the air as a celebration.

== Bibliography ==
- A Song of Stone, Iain Banks, London : Abacus, 1997, ISBN 0-349-11011-5
