= Paul Young (actor) =

British actor and presenter (born 1944)

- Born: 3 July 1944 (age 81); Edinburgh, Scotland
- Occupations: Actor, Presenter
- Known for: Take the High Road (1987–1990); The Tales of Para Handy (1994–1995); The Last Salute (1998–1999); Still Game (2002–2007, 2014, 2016–2019)

Paul Young (born 3 July 1944) is a Scottish stage, film, television and radio actor and presenter from Edinburgh.

== Life and career ==
Paul Young was born in Edinburgh on 3 July 1944, the son of the actor John Young. He was educated at George Heriot's School in Edinburgh.

Young started acting as a child. His first performance was as Tiny Tim in the Edinburgh Gateway Company's production of A Christmas Carol in 1953, and he played the eponymous hero of the film Geordie in 1955. He played First Officer William Murdoch in the 1979 TV movie S. O. S. Titanic. Young also had a key supporting role in the Michael Winner made western Chato's Land (1972), which starred Charles Bronson, Jack Palance and Richard Basehart. Some of his later credits include The Tales of Para Handy, No Job for a Lady, Taggart, The Crow Road, Coronation Street and Still Game.

Young has gone on to lead a series of fishing TV shows, which began with "Hooked On Scotland" on the BBC in 1991. The show won a BAFTA for the first series. After two series, the show switched to ITV (Scottish TV), with the name changing to Hooked on Scottish and Paul's brief widening to include trips to fishing hot-spots around the world.

In 1999, Young was hooked by Scottish, and the show - with much the same format of Paul catching fish in many interesting places, each episode showcasing a different type of fish - was taken on by the Discovery Channel with the name changing again to "Hooked on Fishing". This ran for six series up to 2004.

Young plays the character of Hugh "Shug" McLaughlin in Still Game, appearing occasionally in the early series but by series 5 and 6 becoming a regular cast member. Nicknamed "Shug the Lug" on the account of his distinctively large ears. Shug is generally the only pensioner that knows about gadgets and new technology in the group, owing to his service in the Royal Navy as a radio operator during World War II.

Young was involved in the lost Beatles interview, recorded in April 1964 at the Scottish Television studios, Cowcaddens, Glasgow. The reel of film was found in a rusting film can in South London.

Young played a Canadian character called Keith in a rather touristy short film of Irvine, Ayrshire made in the 1970s.

== Theatre ==
Year	Title	Role	Company	Director	Notes
1953	A Christmas Carol	Tiny Tim	Gateway Theatre, Edinburgh	James Gibson	
1972	Willie Rough	Sam Thomson	Lyceum Theatre, Edinburgh	Bill Bryden	
1972	Kidnapped	David Balfour	Lyceum Theatre, Edinburgh	Bill Bryden	adaptation by Keith Dewhurst
1981	Let Wives Tak Tent	Walter	The Scottish Theatre Company	David Thompson	play by Robert Kemp
1982	An Satyre of the Thrie Estaites	Wantonness	The Scottish Theatre Company	Tom Fleming	play by Sir David Lyndsay, adapted by Robert Kemp

== Filmography ==
=== Film ===
Film
Year	Title	Role	Notes
1955	Geordie	Young Geordie	
1957	Let's Be Happy	Page Boy Bobby	
1968	Submarine X-1	Leading Seaman Quentin	
1972	Madame Sin	Naval Driver	
1972	Chato's Land	Brady Logan	
1980	Death Watch	Police Officer	
1980	A Change of Seasons	Disco Deejay	
1983	Another Time, Another Place	Dougal	
1985	The Girl in the Picture	Smiley	
1995	Margaret's Museum	Doctor 1	
1997	Regeneration	Dr Brock	
1999	My Life So Far	Doctor Gebbie	
2000	Complicity	Frank	
2004	One Last Chance	Mr. Clouston	

=== Television ===
Television
Year	Title	Role	Notes
1958	The Devil as a Roaring Lion	Joel Mackenzie	TV film
1963	Dr. Finlay's Casebook	Delivery Boy	"Possessed of Devils"
1965	The Wednesday Play	Tom	"A Knight in Tarnished Armour"
1965	Dr. Finlay's Casebook	Ian Buchanan	"Off the Hook"
1966	Scottish Playbill	Ken Villiers	"The Inward Lens"
1967	The Dark Number	Jo-Jo	"Episode 1.2"
1967	This Man Craig	Hector McInnes	"The Day's Run"
1967	St. Ives	Officer	"Lion Rampant"
1967	Thirty-Minute Theatre	Tex	"The Gun"
1967	The Revenue Men	Various characters	3 episodes
1968	The Flight of the Heron	Lieutenant Sharpe	
1969	Dr. Finlay's Casebook	Peter	"Single or Return"
1969	The Wednesday Play	Laurie Kyle	"Patterson O.K."
1969	The Doctors	Registrar	"Episode 1.6"
1970	The Borderers	Mat	"Hostage"
1972	The Regiment	Gilmour	"Wine and Retribution"
1972	Sunset Song	Will Guthrie	
1973	The View from Daniel Pike	Purser	"A Slight Case of Absalom"
1973	Weir of Hermiston	Dand Elliott	
1973	Sutherland's Law	Advocate Depute	"The House"
1974	The Haggard Falcon	Bastien	
1975	The Hill of the Red Fox	Policeman	"Episode 1.5"
1976	Sutherland's Law	Hugh Giles	"Shades of Black"
1976	The Sullivans	Phil Chambers	
1979	The Omega Factor	Frank	"Visitations"
1979	S.O.S. Titanic	First Officer: William Murdoch	TV film
1979	The Camerons	Warrick	"Episode 1.5 - 1.6"
1980	Airport Chaplain	Andy Blair	"The Eye of Faith" & "Arrivals and Departures"
1980	Square Mile of Murder	Rutherford Clark	"The Sandyford Place Mystery"
1980	Doom Castle	Simon MacTaggart	
1981	The Walls of Jericho	Dr. Juckes	"Rivals in Arms"
1981	The House on the Hill	McGregor	"Man of Straw"
1982	ITV Playhouse	Simon	"Something's Got to Give"
1984	The Odd Job Man	Victor	"Episode 1.1"
1984	Scotland's Story	Andrew Hardie	"Of Government and Man"
1984	City Lights	Malky Boyd	"Talent"
1986	The Holy City	Matthew	TV film
1987	Brond	Senior Officer	"Episode 1.2 - 1.3"
1987	First Sight	Det. Insp. Mackie	"Extras"
1987	Taggart	Colin Davidson	“Funeral Rites”
1987–1990	Take the High Road	Reverend Gerald Parker	
1988	Dramarama	Roddy McDonald	"The Secret of Croftmore"
1989	Screen Two	Snodgrass	"Leaving"
1989	The Justice Game	Derek Crawford	"Episode 1.1 - 1.4"
1989	Albert and the Lion	MacNulty	TV film
1990	The Campbells	Dr. Robert Armstrong	"Old Ways and New" & "Truth Will Out"
1990	Lorna Doone	Neighbour	TV film
1990–1992	No Job for a Lady	Ken Miller	
1991	Poirot	Mr. McNeil	"The Million Dollar Bond Robbery"
1992	Rab C. Nesbitt	Lawyer	"That's Entertainment"
1993	I, Lovett	Matted Lump	"Baldy"
1993	Rab C. Nesbitt	Doctor	"Wean"
1993	Strathblair	Max Crichton	"Episode 2.7"
1994	The Bill	Michael Sturridge	"RTA"
1994	Rab C. Nesbitt	Radio Announcer (voice)	"Eorpa"
1994–1995	The Tales of Para Handy	Andrew Campbell	
1995	The Plant	Dick the Programme Controller	TV film
1995	Backup	Chief Insp. Best	"Mouth and Trousers"
1995	Taggart	Patrick Liddell	"Legends Part One"
1996	Soldier Soldier	Gen MacDonald Brown	"Dear Joe..."
1996	The Crow Road	Hamish McHoan	
1998–1999	The Last Salute	Mr. Bannerman	
1999	Coronation Street	Jock MacCall	3 episodes
2000	My Fragile Heart	DCI Owen Simmons	TV film
2000	Brotherly Love	Desmond Wilkie	"Time Gentlemen Please"
2001	Randall & Hopkirk (Deceased)	Inspector Woodhuish	"O Happy Isle"
2002–2019	Still Game	Shug	

== Radio ==
Date	Title	Role	Director	Station
14 December 1997	The Secret Commonwealth	Robert Kirk	Patrick Rayner	BBC Radio 4
8 January 2004	Bampot Central	Mackay/Captain Finlay Craig	Lu Kemp	BBC Radio 3 The Wire
30 July 2007	Be Prepared: The Amateur Assassin	Reader	Kirsty Williams	BBC Radio 4 Afternoon Reading
17 March 2008	The Singing Sands	Reader	-	BBC Radio 7 repeated on Radio4Extra, 21 to 24 May 2012
7 January 2009	The Intelligence of Hearts	Reader	Eilidh McCreadie	BBC Radio 4 Scottish Shorts
11 November 2012 – 18 November 2012	The Black Book	Torrance & Vanderhyde	Bruce Young	BBC Radio 4 Classic Serial
18 February 2014	McLevy: A Different Path	Craddock	Bruce Young	BBC Radio 4 Afternoon Drama
4 March 2014	McLevy: A Sore Convulsion	Craddock	Bruce Young	BBC Radio 4 Afternoon Drama
13 February 2016 – 20 February 2016	A Question of Blood	Fogg	Bruce Young	BBC Radio 4 The Saturday Play
