= Gavin Millar =

Scottish critic, film director, and television presenter (1938–2022)

- Born: 11 January 1938; Clydebank, Scotland
- Died: 20 April 2022 (aged 84)
- Occupations: Critic; film director; television presenter

Gavin Millar (11 January 1938 – 20 April 2022) was a Scottish film director, critic and television presenter.

== Biography ==
Millar was born in Clydebank, near Glasgow, the son of Tom Millar and his wife Rita (née Osborne). The family relocated to the Midlands when he was nine and he was educated at King Edward's School, Birmingham. He undertook national service in the Royal Air Force and then read English at Christ Church, Oxford from 1958 to 1961. Millar took a postgraduate film course at the Slade School of Fine Art in London.

== Career ==
Millar was a film critic for The Listener from 1970 to 1984. He also contributed to Sight and Sound and the London Review of Books. He wrote a new section to Karel Reisz's book The Technique of Film Editing for the 1968 edition. On television, he wrote, produced and presented Arena Cinema for the BBC from 1976 to 1980, and wrote and presented numerous other cinema and visual arts documentaries.

In 1980, he directed Dennis Potter's Cream in My Coffee for London Weekend Television, which received a BAFTA nomination. His first feature film as director was 1985's Dreamchild. He would later collaborate with Dreamchild's producer Rick McCallum again on the episode Peking, March 1910, part of George Lucas's television series The Young Indiana Jones Chronicles in 1993. It was later re-edited to be part of Journey of Radiance when the series became The Adventures of Young Indiana Jones on its DVD release. His 1994 television film Pat and Margaret, featuring Victoria Wood, received a further BAFTA nomination, and Housewife, 49 (2006), a later collaboration with Wood, won the 2007 award.

== Personal life, illness and death ==
Millar married Sylvia Lane in 1966. She died in 2012. The couple had five children.

Millar died of a brain tumour on 20 April 2022, aged 84.

== Selected works ==
=== Feature films ===
- 1985 Dreamchild
- 1989 Danny, the Champion of the World
- 1995 Funny Bones (actor only)
- 1997 Journey of Radiance
- 2000 Complicity
- 2009 Albert Schweitzer

=== TV ===
- 1970 Music on 2
  - Episode "The Eye Hears, The Ear Sees"
- 1980 Cream in My Coffee
- 1982 Intensive Care
- 1983 Secrets
- 1983 The Weather in the Streets
- 1984 Unfair Exchanges
- 1985 The Russian Soldier; Mr and Mrs Edgehill
- 1987 Scoop
- 1988 Tidy Endings
- 1991 A Murder of Quality
- 1991 My Friend Walter
- 1992 Look at It This Way
- 1993 The Young Indiana Jones Chronicles
- 1993 The Dwelling Place
- 1994 Pat and Margaret; A Case of Coincidence
- 1995 Belle Epoque
- 1996 The Crow Road
- 1997 Sex & Chocolate
- 1998 This Could Be the Last Time; Talking Heads 2
- 2000 My Fragile Heart
- 2001 Confessions of an Ugly Stepsister
- 2002 Ella and the Mothers
- 2002 The Vice
- 2002 The Last Detective
- 2004 King of Fridges
- 2004-7 Foyle's War
- 2005 Pickles, the Dog Who Won the World Cup
- 2006 Housewife, 49
