= Espedair Street (radio) =

Espedair Street was a four-part BBC radio adaptation of the Iain Banks novel Espedair Street broadcast on BBC Radio 4 in January 1998. The dramatisation was by Joe Dunlop and it was produced by Dave Batchelor. The series was narrated by Paul Gambaccini in the style of a documentary as if actually being broadcast on BBC Radio 1, having the subtitle The Frozen Gold Story, and usually starting with a 1980s era jingle from that station.

Cast:

- John Gordon Sinclair (Daniel Weir)
- Louise Beattie (Christine Brice)
- James MacPherson (Davey Balfour)
- Steven McNicoll (Rick Tumbler)
- 'Sandy' Alexander Morton (McCann)
- Martin Docherty (Wee Tommy)
- Margaret Clarke (Jean)
- Douglas Russell (Wes)
- Gowan Calder (Inez)
- Graham Debanzi (Nightclub Manager)

The music was credited as written by Iain Banks and arranged by Nigel Clark, it was performed by Nigel Clark, Brian Kellock, Nick Clark (guitar) Nigel Spennewyn (guitar) and Gordon Wilson (percussion), with Monica Queen singing the parts of Christine. This band performed a charity concert as Frozen Gold, in Glasgow on 21 December 1997.
