= Walking on Glass =

1985 novel by Iain Banks

- First edition
- Author: Iain Banks
- Cover artist: Philip Mann ACE/Marcus Wilson Smith photo
- Language: English
- Publisher: Macmillan
- Publication date: 7 March 1985
- Publication place: Scotland
- Media type: Print (Hardback & Paperback)
- Pages: 239 pp
- ISBN: 0-349-10178-7
- OCLC: 29905179

Walking on Glass is the second novel by Scottish writer Iain Banks, published in 1985.

Walking on Glass is formed of three storylines that initially do not appear to be linked, but eventually come together. The extent to which these stories are interconnected is dependent on how deeply into the book the reader is willing to read.

== Plot summary ==
Each part of Walking on Glass, apart from the last, is divided into three sections, which appear at first sight to be independent stories. Two of the stories are set in and around Islington in North London; the other is set in the far distant future.

- Graham Park is a young man in love with a girl he met at a party, Sara ffitch. Richard Slater is his friend. Bob Stock, a "macho black-leathered never-properly-seen image of Nemesis" seems all that stands in the way of Graham's happiness.
- Steven Grout is a paranoid roadmender who believes himself to be an admiral from a galactic war imprisoned in the body of an Earthman. He believes he is under constant threat from the Microwave Gun, and reads much science fiction, since "he had long ago realised that if he [were] going to find any clues to the whereabouts of the Way Out, the location or identity of the Key, there was a good chance he might get some ideas from that type of writing."
- Quiss and Ajayi are war criminals from opposing sides in a galactic war, who are imprisoned in the Castle of Bequest (also Castle Doors) and forced to play impossible games until they can solve the riddle: "What happens when an unstoppable force meets an immovable object?"

Eventually, links between the three storylines become apparent.

== Literary significance and criticism ==
Iain Banks commented that the book "didn't do exactly what it set out to do and I think you have failed to an extent if the reader can't understand what you're saying. I worry sometimes that people will read Walking on Glass and think in some way I was trying to fool them, which I wasn't."

== Release details ==
- 1985, UK, Macmillan (ISBN 0-333-37986-1) Pub date 7 March 1985, hardback (first edition)
