= The Business (novel) =

1999 novel by Iain Banks

- Author: Iain Banks
- Cover artist: Peter Brown
- Language: English
- Publisher: Little, Brown
- Publication date: 1999
- Publication place: Scotland
- Media type: Print (Hardback & Paperback)
- Pages: 390 pp
- ISBN: 0-316-64844-2
- OCLC: 41258385

The Business is a novel by the Scottish writer Iain Banks, published in 1999.

== Plot introduction ==
Kate Telman is a 'level 3' executive in the Business, a vast business empire. During her sabbatical year, she comes to suspect that some of her colleagues are stealing from the organisation, and investigates.

== Plot summary ==
The book starts with a 4:37 a.m. phone call from Mike Daniels to Kathryn (Kate) Telman. He has been drugged, and about half of his teeth randomly and expertly extracted, just before an important meeting in Japan.

The Business is a long-lived and powerful secretive multinational commercial organisation. It predates the Roman Catholic Church, and descends from a consortium of merchants in the Roman Empire, which it owned for sixty-six days. It hired a man to become emperor, but he lasted less than a month before being assassinated; a reference to the emperor Didius Julianus. It is now considering taking over a country in order to gain a seat at the United Nations.

The story follows the heroine, Kate Telman, who is 38 and lusts after Stephen Buzetski, who is married. Starting from poverty, she has risen through the Business under the tutelage of her mentor, who adopted her at an early age, and her 'uncle Freddy', the man who invented the portable milk container (named the "chilp").

She is investigating a possible case of someone stealing from the company, starting with strange happenings at a silicon chip manufacturing plant. Although she discovers evidence of wrongdoing at a high level in the Business, she continues to believe in what they are doing as an organisation.

She travels the world, at one point being summoned by a weapon-collecting higher-up in Nebraska to talk his nephew out of writing an incendiary anti-Islamic screenplay. A scene of the book takes place on a ship on its way to be broken up at a shipyard in Sonmiani Bay. She has several telephone conversations with her therapy-damaged friend Luce in California, who provides a cynical, suspicious, foul-mouthed counterpoint to Kate's goodheartedness. She is given a DVD of Stephen's wife having extramarital sex in an attempt to influence her.

She also becomes involved in the acquisition of the small Himalayan country of Thulahn. Small and underdeveloped, bleak and vulnerable, the football pitch doubles as the airport, "the royal palace is heated by yak dung" and the "national sport is emigration". It resembles an exaggerated version of Bhutan.

Under the Business's plan, Thulahn would be utterly changed, if not destroyed, and its people thrust into the modern world. Kate is given the job of negotiating with Thulahn's crown prince Suvinder Dzung, who when he last met her had fallen in love with her.

== Bibliography ==
The Business, Iain Banks, London : Little, Brown, 1999, ISBN 0-316-64844-2 (ISBN 0-316-84863-8 (paperback))
