= The Bridge (Banks novel) =

1986 novel by Iain Banks

- First edition
- Author: Iain Banks
- Cover artist: Philip Mann ACE
- Language: English
- Publisher: Macmillan Publishers
- Publication date: 1986
- Publication place: Scotland
- Media type: Print (Hardback & Paperback)
- Pages: 256 pp
- ISBN: 0-06-105358-9
- OCLC: 36103885
- Dewey Decimal: 823/.914 21
- LC Class: PR6052.A485 B75 1997

The Bridge is a novel by Scottish author Iain Banks. It was published in 1986. The book switches between three protagonists: John Orr, his real life character and the Barbarian. It is an unconventional love story.

== Plot summary ==
"The road cleared the cutting through the hills. He could see South Queensferry, the marina at Port Edgar, the VAT 69 sign of the distillery there, the lights of Hewlett-Packard’s factory; and the rail bridge, dark in the evening’s last sky-reflected light. Behind it, more lights; the Hound Point oil terminal they’d had a sub-contract on, and, further away, the lights of Leith. The old rail bridge’s hollow metal bones looked the colour of dried blood.

You fucking beauty, he thought . . . What a gorgeous great device you are. So delicate from this distance, so massive and strong close-up. Elegance and grace; perfect form. A quality bridge; granite piers, the best ship-plate steel, and a never-ending paint job..."

The three main characters represent different elements of the protagonist. (never explicitly named), John Orr and The Barbarian are one.

The main character is a real person, born in Glasgow, who studied geology and engineering at the University of Edinburgh, fell in love with Andrea Cramond while there, and has continued their (open) relationship ever since. He is embittered by his betrayal of his working-class roots (he has become a manager and partner in his engineering firm), the Cold War, successive Thatcher governments, and the failure of his relationship under the pressure of Andrea's French lover's terminal illness. While returning from a sentimental reunion with an old friend in Fife, during which alcohol and cannabis are consumed, he becomes distracted by the power and beauty of the Forth Railway Bridge while driving on the neighbouring Forth Road Bridge and crashes his car. While in a coma in hospital, he relives his life up to the crash.

"He glanced back at the roadway of the bridge as it rose slowly to its gentle, suspended summit. The surface was a little damp, but nothing to worry about. No problems. He wasn’t going all that fast anyway, staying in the nearside lane, looking over at the rail bridge downstream. A light winked at the far end of the island under the rail bridge’s middle-section. One day, though, even you’ll be gone. Nothing lasts. Maybe that’s what I want to tell her. Maybe I want to say, No, of course I don’t mind; you must go. I can’t grudge the man that; you’d have done the same for me and I would for you. Just a pity, that’s all. Go; we’ll all survive. Maybe some good-

He was aware of the truck in front pulling out suddenly. He looked round to see a car in front of him. It was stopped, abandoned in the nearside lane. He sucked his breath in, stamped on the brakes, tried to swerve; but it was too late."

John Orr is an amnesiac living on the Bridge, a fictional version of the rail bridge, of indeterminate length but at least hundreds of miles long and packed with people. The crash which precipitated his arrival on the bridge was semi-deliberate; as such, he is reluctant to return to the real world. That part of himself who wishes to wake is represented by Dr Joyce, Orr's psychoanalyst. Given Orr/Alex's desire to remain within the world of the Bridge, a world where he is well treated and lives a fairly pampered life, his attempts to stonewall and block the doctor's attempts to cure him are understandable. Eventually, he stows away on a train and leaves the Bridge. He finds that, in stark contrast to the very orderly, indeed totalitarian, life on The Bridge, the countryside beyond exists in militaristic chaos and warfare.

The Barbarian is an id-ish warrior with a superego-esque familiar in tow (phallic symbolism is referenced by the familiar within a few pages of their first appearance) whose hack and slash antics through various parodies of Greek legends and fairy tales are phonetically rendered in Scots dialect (seven years before Irvine Welsh used the technique in Trainspotting). The Barbarian (along with his loquacious familiar) are a deep expression of Alex's character; when Orr's dreams are not themed around threat and opposition he dreams he is the Barbarian.

The Barbarian appears to be an expression of Alex's deepest feelings. A woman is his enemy in their first appearance (Metamorphosis, Four), showing how Andrea Cramond has made her influence felt in Alex's very core, and how his love for her has been eroded and has transmuted into anger and contempt through the rift that has opened in their relationship.

In their second appearance (Metamorphosis, Four), a female character is mentioned in passing, with a certain level of affection.

The third appearance of the Barbarian and familiar (Metamorphosis, Pliocene) sees them old, decrepit, bed-bound and heading inevitably towards death. In each successive chapter the Barbarian's Scottish accent becomes less and less pronounced, another indication of how far Alex has gone from his Glaswegian roots. The Barbarian talks of his grief over his dead wife and his memories of their life together. While comparisons have been drawn between Sigmund Freud's structural theory of personality, this is the only point where the Barbarian, Familiar and another individual get together in a three-way arrangement.In a move mirroring the suicide drive and anticipating the end of the book, he is placed in a situation likely to kill him, but triumphs and emerges (literally) rejuvenated and reinvigorated. His Glasgow accent also returns.

The Bridge is an unconventional love story; the characters eschew fidelity and barely see each other for years at a time, but they keep returning to each other. There is no marriage, no ring, no happy ever after, just the knowledge that their lives are so deeply entwined it would be difficult or impossible for them to break away from each other.

"You don't belong to her and she doesn't belong to you, but you're both part of each other; if she got up and left now and walked away and you never saw each other again for the rest of your lives, and you lived an ordinary waking life for another fifty years, even so on your deathbed you would know she was part of you."

The fate of the protagonist and Andrea is revealed in a passage in a later book, Complicity.

== Literary significance & criticism ==
Banks said that of his novels, this was his personal favourite. "Definitely the intellectual of the family, it's the one that went away to University and got a first. I think The Bridge is the best of my books."

Kafkaesque and multi-layered, it shares elements in common with his Culture books, even including mention of a knife missile late in the book. However, Banks stated "That one knife missile mention has been enough for purists to claim that, technically, The Bridge is a Culture novel. Tenuous, I'd say." Banks said that after this book, he felt his SF and non-SF work diverged.

== Allusions and symbolism ==
Some characters are allusions to persons involved in the construction of Forth Railway Bridge: Chief Engineer Arrol refers to the proprietor of the construction company, Sir William Arrol, whilst Engineers Baker and Fowler represent the two principal designers of the bridge, Sir Benjamin Baker and Sir John Fowler.

== Bibliography ==
- The Bridge, Iain Banks, London : Macmillan, 1986, ISBN 0-333-41285-0
