= Iain Banks =

Scottish writer (1954–2013)

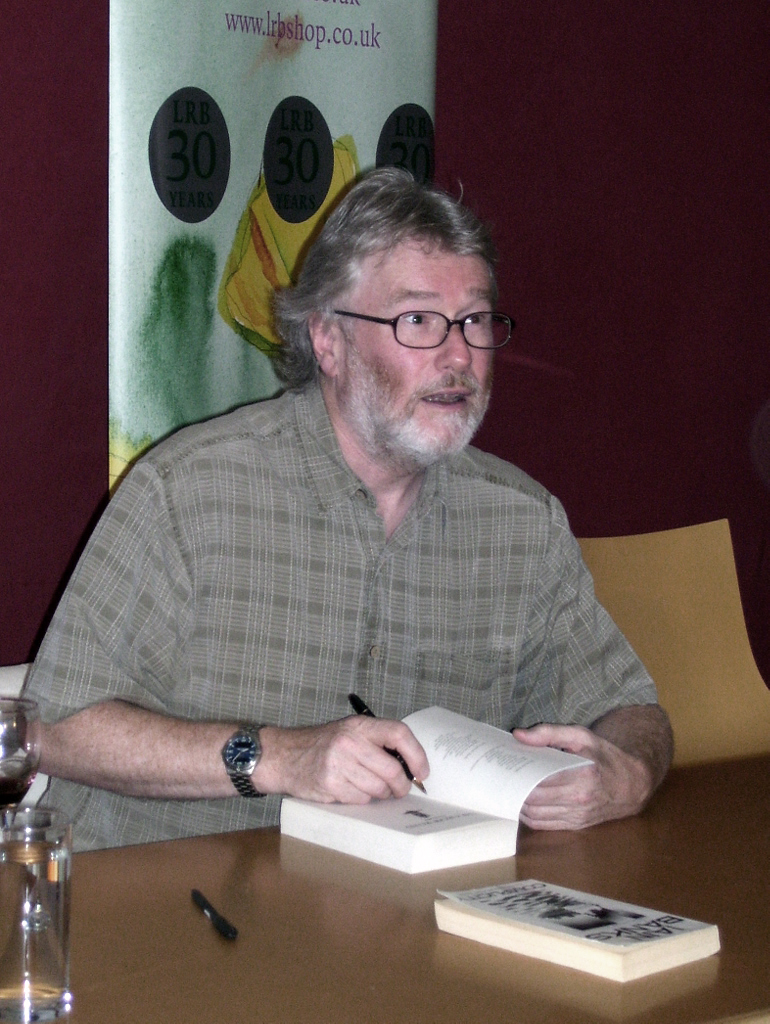
- Banks at the Edinburgh International Book Festival, 2009
- Born: Iain Menzies Banks; 16 February 1954; Dunfermline, Fife, Scotland
- Died: 9 June 2013 (aged 59); Kirkcaldy, Fife, Scotland
- Education: University of Stirling (BA)
- Occupation: Writer
- Spouse(s): Annie Blackburn (m. 1992; div. 2007) Adele Hartley (m. 2013)
- Writing career
- Pen name: Iain M. Banks
- Period: 1984–2013
- Genres: Science fiction; Literary fiction
- Iain Banks's voice from the BBC programme Open Book, 23 October 2009
- Website: iainbanks.co.uk

Iain Menzies Banks (/ˈmɪŋɪz/; 16 February 1954 – 9 June 2013) was a Scottish author, writing mainstream fiction as Iain Banks and science fiction as Iain M. Banks. His books have been adapted for theatre, radio, and television. In 2008, The Times named Banks in their list of the 50 greatest British writers since 1945.

Banks began writing full time after the success of his debut novel The Wasp Factory (1984), which has since sold over a million copies and been translated into 80 languages. The novel was named one of the 100 best books of the 20th century in a 1997 poll; (Note: The poll was conducted by Waterstones and Channel 4.) in 2016, it was ranked the second-best Scottish novel of all time in a BBC Scotland poll. (Note: The poll was conducted by BBC Scotland in partnership with the Scottish Book Trust and the Scottish Library and Information Council.) His first science fiction book, Consider Phlebas (1987), marked the start of the Culture series, consisting of ten novels.

== Early life ==
Banks was born in Dunfermline, Fife, to a mother who was a professional ice skater and a father who was an officer in the Admiralty. An only child, he lived in North Queensferry until the age of nine, near the naval dockyards in Rosyth, where his father was based. The family then moved to Gourock because of his father's work. When someone introduced him to science fiction by giving him Kemlo and the Zones of Silence by Reginald Alec Martin, he continued reading the series, which encouraged him to write science fiction himself. Banks attended Gourock and Greenock High Schools. From 1972 to 1975, Banks studied English, philosophy, and psychology at the University of Stirling.

After graduation, Banks took a succession of jobs that left him free to write in the evenings. These supported his writing throughout his twenties and allowed him to take long breaks between contracts, during which time he travelled through Europe and North America. During this period, he worked as an IBM 'Expediter Analyser' (a kind of procurement clerk), a testing technician for the British Steel Corporation, and a costing clerk for a law firm in London's Chancery Lane.

== Career ==
=== Writing career ===
Banks took up writing at the age of 11. He completed a first novel, The Hungarian Lift-Jet, at 16 and a second, TTR (also entitled The Tashkent Rambler), in his first year at Stirling University in 1972. He wrote in various genres, but said that he enjoyed science fiction most; however, his initial publishing failures led him to pursue mainstream fiction. His first published novel, The Wasp Factory, appeared in 1984, when he was thirty. After the success of The Wasp Factory, Banks began to write full time. His editor at Macmillan, James Hale, advised him to write a book a year, which he agreed to do.

His second novel, Walking on Glass, followed in 1985, then The Bridge in 1986, and in 1987 Espedair Street, which was later broadcast as a series on BBC Radio 4. His first science-fiction book, Consider Phlebas, was published in 1987 and was the first of several in the acclaimed Culture series. Banks cited Robert A. Heinlein, Isaac Asimov, Arthur C. Clarke, Brian Aldiss, M. John Harrison and Dan Simmons as influences. The Crow Road, published in 1992, was adapted as a BBC television series. Banks continued to write both science fiction and mainstream works. In 2004, Banks wrote Raw Spirit (subtitled In Search of the Perfect Dram), a travel book of his visits to the single malt distilleries of Scotland in search of the finest whisky, including his musings on other subjects such as roads, cars and politics.

Banks published work under two names. His parents had named him "Iain Menzies Banks", but his father mistakenly omitted the middle name when registering his son. Banks still used the middle name and submitted The Wasp Factory for publication as "Iain M. Banks". Banks's editor inquired about the possibility of omitting the 'M' as it appeared "too fussy" and the potential existed for confusion with Rosie M. Banks, a romantic novelist in the Jeeves novels by P. G. Wodehouse; Banks agreed to the omission. After three mainstream novels, Banks's publishers agreed to publish his first science fiction novel Consider Phlebas. To create a distinction between the mainstream and the science fiction, Banks suggested returning the 'M' to his name, which was then used in all of his science-fiction works.

By his death in June 2013, Banks had published 26 novels. His 27th novel, The Quarry, appeared posthumously in June 2013, the month of his death. His final work, a poetry collection, appeared in February 2015. In an interview in January 2013, he also mentioned he had the plot idea for another novel in the Culture series, which would most likely have been his next book and was planned for publication in 2014. He had been due to be a guest of honour at the 2014 World Science Fiction Convention, Loncon 3, but died the previous year.

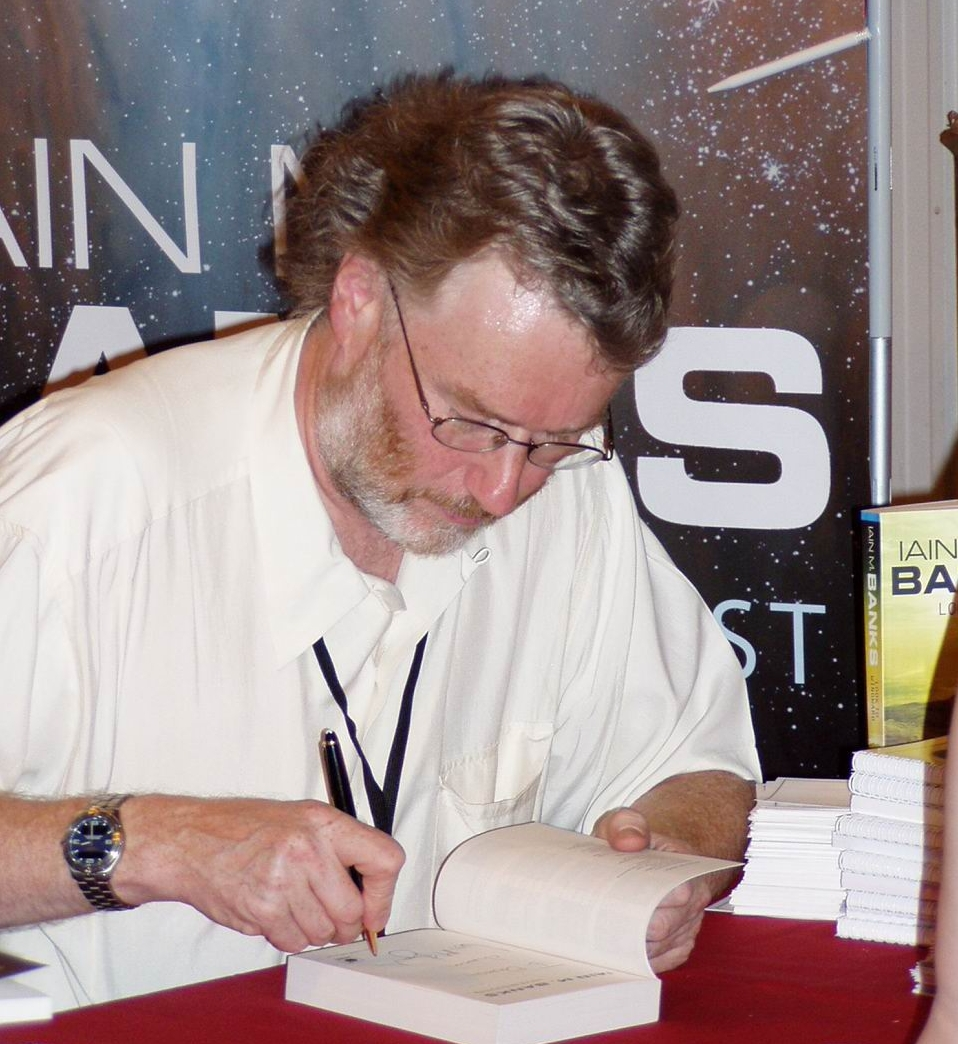
Banks book signing at the 63rd World Science Fiction Convention in Glasgow, August 2005

In February 2018, a project to publish Banks's unseen early drawings, maps and sketches from the Culture universe alongs with his writings and notes on the setting was underway. In 2021, the delayed single volume of The Culture: Notes and Drawings was cancelled and replaced with two separate volumes: a landscape artbook of The Culture: The Drawings and a companion volume containing notes, excerpts and new text from Ken MacLeod. The Culture: The Drawings was released on 7 November 2023, while the still-untitled companion volume was scheduled for late 2024.

=== Radio and television ===
Banks was the subject of "The Strange Worlds of Iain Banks" episode of South Bank Show (1997), a TV documentary that examined his mainstream writing, and was an in-studio guest for the final episode of Marc Riley's Rocket Science radio show, broadcast on BBC Radio 6 Music. An audio version of The Business, set to contemporary music, arranged by Paul Oakenfold, was broadcast in October 1999 on Galaxy FM as the tenth Urban Soundtracks. Banks's The State of the Art, adapted for radio by Paul Cornell, was broadcast on BBC Radio 4 in 2009 with Nadia Molinari producing and directing. In 1998 Espedair Street was dramatised as a serial for Radio 4, presented by Paul Gambaccini in the style of a Radio 1 documentary.

In 2011 Banks featured on the BBC Radio 4 programme Saturday Live. Banks reaffirmed his atheism in this appearance, explaining death as an important "part of the totality of life" that should be treated realistically instead of feared.

Banks appeared on the BBC television programme Question Time, a show that features political discussion. In 2006 he captained a team of writers to victory in a special series of BBC Two's University Challenge. Banks also won a 2006 edition of BBC One's Celebrity Mastermind; the author selected "Malt whisky and the distilleries of Scotland" as his specialist subject.

His final interview was with Kirsty Wark, broadcast on BBC Two Scotland as Iain Banks: Raw Spirit, on 12 June 2013.

BBC One Scotland and BBC Two broadcast an adaptation of his novel Stonemouth in June 2015.

=== Theatre ===
Banks was involved in the stage production The Curse of Iain Banks, written by Maxton Walker and performed at the Edinburgh Fringe festival in 1999. Banks collaborated frequently with its soundtrack composer Gary Lloyd, for instance on a song collection they co-composed as a tribute to the fictional band Frozen Gold from Banks's novel Espedair Street. Lloyd also scored for a spoken word and music production of his novel The Bridge, which Banks himself voiced and which featured a cast of 40 musicians, released on CD by Codex Records in 1996. Lloyd recorded Banks for including in the play as a disembodied voice of himself in one of the cast member's dreams. Lloyd explained his collaboration with Banks on their first versions of Espedair Street (later versions being dated between 2005 and 2013) in a Guardian article before the opening of The Curse of Iain Banks:

When he [Banks] first played them to me, I think he was worried that they might not be up to scratch (some of them dated back to 1973 and had never been heard). He needn't have worried. They're fantastic. We're slaving away to get the songs to the stage where we can go into the studio and make a demo. Iain bashes out melodies on his state-of-the-art Apple Mac in Edinburgh and sends them down to me in Chester where I put them onto my Atari.

== Politics ==
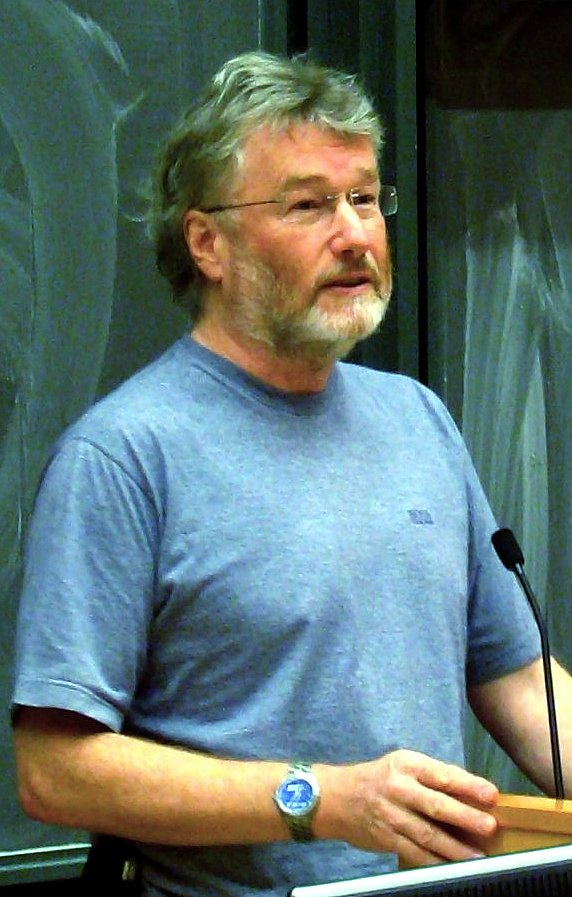
Iain Banks in 2008

Banks's political stance has been termed "left of centre" and in 2002 he endorsed the Scottish Socialist Party.

He was an Honorary Associate of the National Secular Society and a Distinguished Supporter of the Humanist Society Scotland. As a signatory to the Declaration of Calton Hill, he supported Scottish independence. In November 2012, Banks backed the campaign group emerging from the Radical Independence Conference held in that month. He opined that the independence movement was marked by cooperation: "Scots just seem to be more communitarian than the consensus expressed by the UK population as a whole."

In late 2004, Banks joined a group of UK politicians and media figures campaigning to have Prime Minister Tony Blair impeached after the 2003 invasion of Iraq. In protest, he cut up his passport and posted it to 10 Downing Street. In a Socialist Review interview, Banks explained that his passport protest occurred after he had "abandoned the idea of crashing my Land Rover through the gates of Fife dockyard, after spotting the guys armed with machine guns." Banks relayed his concerns about the Iraq invasion in his book Raw Spirit and through the protagonist Alban McGill in the novel The Steep Approach to Garbadale, who confronts another character with arguments of a similar kind.

In 2010, Banks called for a cultural and educational boycott of Israel after the Gaza flotilla raid incident. In a letter to The Guardian newspaper, Banks said he had instructed his agent to turn down any further book translation deals with Israeli publishers:

Appeals to reason, international law, U. N. resolutions and simple human decency mean – it is now obvious – nothing to Israel... I would urge all writers, artists and others in the creative arts, as well as those academics engaging in joint educational projects with Israeli institutions, to consider doing everything they can to convince Israel of its moral degradation and ethical isolation, preferably by simply having nothing more to do with this outlaw state.

An extract from Banks's contribution to the written collection Generation Palestine: Voices from the Boycott, Divestment and Sanctions Movement, entitled "Our People", appeared in The Guardian in the wake of the author's cancer revelation. The extract conveys the author's support for the Boycott, Divestment and Sanctions (BDS) campaign issued by a Palestinian civil society against Israel until the country complies with what it holds are international law and Palestinian rights. This commenced in 2005 and applies lessons from Banks's experience with South Africa's apartheid era. The continuation of Banks's boycott of Israeli publishers for the sale of rights to his novels was confirmed in the extract and Banks further explained, "I don't buy Israeli-sourced products or food, and my partner and I try to support Palestinian-sourced products wherever possible."

== Personal life ==
Banks met his first wife Annie in London before the 1984 release of his first book. They lived in Faversham in the south of England, then split up in 1988. Banks returned to Edinburgh and dated another woman for two years. After she left him, Iain and Annie were reconciled and moved to Fife. They married in Hawaii in 1992, but in 2005, after 15 years of marriage, they separated.

In 1998, Banks was in a near-fatal accident when his car rolled off the road. In February 2007, Banks sold his extensive car collection, including a 3.2-litre Porsche Boxster, a Porsche 911 Turbo, a 3.8-litre Jaguar Mark II, a 5-litre BMW M5 and a daily-use diesel Land Rover Defender, whose power he had boosted by about 50 per cent. All these Banks exchanged for a Lexus RX 400h hybrid – later replaced by a diesel Toyota Yaris, and said in future he would fly only in emergencies.

Banks posing with a fan in London, 2012

In April 2012, Banks became the "Acting Honorary Non-Executive Figurehead President Elect pro tem (trainee)" of the Science Fiction Book Club based in London. The title was his creation and on 3 October 2012 Banks accepted a T-shirt inscribed with it.

From 1991, Banks lived in North Queensferry on the north side of the Firth of Forth; in later years he was joined by girlfriend Adele Hartley, a horror writer who founded an Edinburgh festival called Dead by Dawn. She first met Banks in 1989. In the early 2000s they began a relationship and married on 29 March 2013 after he asked her to "do me the honour of becoming my widow."

=== Illness and death ===
On 3 April 2013, Banks revealed that he had been diagnosed with terminal gallbladder cancer and was unlikely to live beyond a year. He stated he would be withdrawing from all public engagements and that The Quarry would be his last novel. The dates of publication of The Quarry were brought forward at Banks's request, to 20 June 2013 in the UK and 25 June 2013 in the US and Canada. He died in Kirkcaldy on 9 June 2013, at the age of 59.

=== Remembrance and tribute ===
Banks's publisher called him "an irreplaceable part of the literary world". This was reaffirmed by fellow Scottish author and friend since secondary school Ken MacLeod: his death "left a large gap in the Scottish literary scene as well as the wider English-speaking world." British author Charles Stross wrote, "One of the giants of 20th and 21st century Scottish literature has left the building." Other authors including Neil Gaiman, Ian Rankin, Alastair Reynolds and David Brin also paid tribute in blogs and elsewhere.

The asteroid 5099 Iainbanks was named after him shortly after his death. On 23 January 2015, SpaceX's CEO Elon Musk named two of the firm's autonomous spaceport drone ships Just Read The Instructions and Of Course I Still Love You, after ships in Banks's novel The Player of Games. Another, A Shortfall of Gravitas, began construction in 2018. This refers to the ship Experiencing A Significant Gravitas Shortfall, first mentioned in Look to Windward.

The Red Virgin and the Vision of Utopia, the 2016 graphic biography of Louise Michel by Mary M. Talbot and Bryan Talbot, is "Dedicated to the memory of Iain (M) Banks, friend and sorely missed creator of socialist utopias."

Empire Games, the seventh book in The Merchant Princes series by Charles Stross published in 2017, is dedicated "For Iain M. Banks, who painted a picture of a better way."

On 13 May 2019, the Five Deeps Expedition broke the deepest ocean dive record in the DSV Limiting Factor. The support ship was named DSSV Pressure Drop. Both vessels were named after ships in the Culture series, which is much admired by the explorer Victor Vescovo, also the financial sponsor behind Limiting Factor's design and construction. They also have landers named "Flere," "Skaff," and "Closp," named after Culture drones.

== Awards and nominations ==
Iain Banks received the following literary awards and nominations:

- 1988: British Science Fiction Association Award for The Player of Games (nomination)
- 1990: British Science Fiction Association Award for Use of Weapons (nomination)
- 1991: Arthur C. Clarke Award for Use of Weapons (nomination)
- 1991: Kurd-Laßwitz-Preis for Foreign Novel The Bridge (winner)
- 1992: Kurd-Laßwitz-Preis for Foreign Novel The Wasp Factory (winner)
- 1993: Kurd-Laßwitz-Preis for Foreign Novel Use of Weapons (winner)
- 1994: British Science Fiction Association Award for Feersum Endjinn (winner)
- 1994: Locus Poll Award for Against a Dark Background (nomination)
- 1996: British Science Fiction Association Award for Excession (winner)
- 1997: University of St Andrews honorary degree
- 1997: University of Stirling honorary doctorate
- 1997: British Fantasy Award for Excession (nomination)
- 1998: British Science Fiction Award for Inversions (nomination)
- 1998: Kurd-Laßwitz-Preis for Foreign Novel Excession (winner)
- 2001: Locus Poll Award for Look to Windward (nomination)
- 2004: Premio Italia Science Fiction Award in the Best International Novel category for Inversions (winner)
- 2005: Hugo Award for The Algebraist (nomination)
- 2005: Locus Poll Award for The Algebraist (nomination)
- 2009: Locus Poll Award for Matter (second place)
- 2009: Prometheus Award for Matter (nomination)
- 2010: Open University honorary doctorate
- 2010: John W. Campbell Memorial Award for Transition (finalist)
- 2010: Locus Poll Award for Transition (nomination)
- 2011: Locus Poll Award for Surface Detail (nomination)
- 2013: Honorary Fellow of the Association for Scottish Literary Studies

== Publications ==
=== Non-SF works ===
Banks's non-SF work comprises fourteen novels and one non-fiction book. Many of his novels contain elements of autobiography, and feature various locations in his native Scotland.

==== Fiction ====
- The Wasp Factory (1984). London: Macmillan. ISBN 0-333-36380-9.
- Walking on Glass (1985). London: Macmillan. ISBN 0-333-37986-1.
- The Bridge (1986). London: Macmillan. ISBN 0-333-41285-0.
- Espedair Street (1987). London: Macmillan. ISBN 0-333-44916-9. Adapted for BBC radio in 1998 (directed by Dave Batchelor).
- Canal Dreams (1989). London: Macmillan. ISBN 0-333-51768-7.
- The Crow Road (1992). London: Scribners. ISBN 0-356-20652-1. Adapted for BBC TV in 1996 (directed by Gavin Millar).
- Complicity (1993). London: Little, Brown Book Group. ISBN 0-316-90688-3. Filmed in 2000 (directed by Gavin Millar); retitled Retribution for its US DVD/video release.
- Whit (1995). London: Little, Brown Book Group. ISBN 0-316-91436-3 .
- A Song of Stone (1997). London: Abacus. ISBN 0-316-64016-6.
- The Business (1999). London: Little, Brown Book Group. ISBN 0-316-64844-2.
- Dead Air (2002). London: Little, Brown Book Group. ISBN 0-316-86054-9.
- The Steep Approach to Garbadale (2007). London: Little, Brown Book Group. ISBN 978-0-316-73105-8.
- Stonemouth (2012). London: Little, Brown Book Group. ISBN 978-1-4087-0250-5. Adapted for BBC TV for broadcast in 2015 (directed by Charles Martin).
- The Quarry (2013). London: Little, Brown Book Group. ISBN 978-1-4087-0394-6.

==== Non-fiction ====
- Raw Spirit (2003). London: Century. ISBN 1-84413-195-5 – a travelogue of Scotland and its whisky distilleries.
- Poems (with Ken MacLeod) (2015). London: Little, Brown Group. ISBN 978-1-4087-0587-2.

=== Science fiction ===
Banks wrote thirteen science-fiction novels, nine of which were part of the Culture series. These works focus upon characters that are usually on the margins of the Culture, a post-scarcity anarchist utopia. In the same universe are other civilizations, which the Culture sometimes attempts to influence or "contact", occasionally resulting in conflict. The culture has achieved utopia by handing control of all of their worlds and ships over to sentient artificial intelligences referred to as "Minds".

==== The Culture ====
- Consider Phlebas (April 1987). London: Macmillan. ISBN 0-333-44138-9
- A Gift from the Culture (June 1987). A short story first published in Interzone #20 in 1987, later collected in Banks's 1991 short story collection The State of the Art.
- Descendant (August 1987). A short story first published in the anthology Tales from the Forbidden Planet, edited by Roz Kaveney, published by Titan Books, ISBN 1-85286-004-9, later collected in Banks's 1991 short story collection The State of the Art.
- The Player of Games (1988). London: Macmillan. ISBN 0-333-47110-5
- The State of the Art novella (1989). Willimantic,CT: Ziesing. ISBN 0-929480-06-6. First published on its own, later collected in Banks's 1991 short story collection named after it.
- Use of Weapons (1990). London: Orbit. ISBN 0-356-19160-5
- Excession (1996). London: Orbit. ISBN 1-85723-394-8
- Inversions (1998). London: Orbit. ISBN 1-85723-626-2
- Look to Windward (2000). London: Orbit. ISBN 1-85723-969-5
- Matter (2008). London: Orbit. ISBN 978-1-84149-417-3
- Surface Detail (2010). London: Orbit. ISBN 978-1-84149-893-5
- The Hydrogen Sonata (2012). London: Orbit. ISBN 978-0-356-50150-5

===== The Culture reference books =====
- The Culture: The Drawings (2023). London: Orbit. ISBN 978-0-356-51942-5

==== Other novels ====
- Against a Dark Background (1993). London: Orbit. ISBN 1-85723-031-0
- Feersum Endjinn (1994). London: Orbit. ISBN 1-85723-235-6
- The Algebraist (2004). London: Orbit. ISBN 1-84149-155-1
- Transition (2009). London: Little, Brown Book Group. ISBN 978-0-316-73107-2. (Published in the United States as Iain M. Banks.)

==== Short fiction collections ====
- The State of the Art (1991). London: Orbit. ISBN 0-356-19669-0
  - Includes three short works set in the Culture universe. It also includes works of fiction more characteristic of Banks's writing published as Iain Banks. A radio version of the title story was transmitted by Radio 4 in 2009.
- The Spheres (Birmingham Science Fiction Group, 2010)
  - Includes 'The Spheres', excised from the original draft of Transition; and 'The Secret Courtyard', excised from Matter. Limited edition of 500, to mark Novacon 40.

=== Introductions ===
Banks wrote introductions for works by other writers, including the following:

- Viriconium (1988) by M. John Harrison, the Unwin edition, ISBN 0-04-440245-7.
- The Adventures of Luther Arkwright: Book 3, Götterdämmerung (1989) by Bryan Talbot from Proutt Publishing, ISBN 0-907865-03-8.
- The Orbit Science Fiction Yearbook Three (1990) edited by David S. Garnett, ISBN 0-07-088833-7.
- The Human Front (2001) by Ken MacLeod, the PS Publishing edition, ISBN 1-902880-30-7 (hbk) and ISBN 1-902880-31-5 (pbk).
