= The Wasp Factory =

1984 novel by Iain Banks

- First edition
- Author: Iain Banks
- Audio read by: Peter Kenny
- Cover artist: Philip Mann ACE
- Language: English
- Publisher: Macmillan
- Publication date: 16 February 1984
- Publication place: United Kingdom
- Media type: Print (hardback & paperback)
- Pages: 184
- ISBN: 0-333-36380-9
- OCLC: 22766221

The Wasp Factory is the first novel by Scottish writer Iain Banks, published in 1984. Before the book came out, Banks had written several science fiction novels that had not been accepted for publication. He decided to try a more mainstream novel in the hopes that it would be more readily accepted, and wrote about a psychopathic teenager living on a remote Scottish island. According to Banks, this allowed him to treat the story as something resembling science fiction—the island could be envisaged as a planet, and Frank, the protagonist, almost as an alien. Following the success of The Wasp Factory, Banks began to write full-time.

The Wasp Factory is written from a first person perspective, told by 16-year-old Francis Cauldhame ("Frank"), describing his childhood and all that remains of it. Frank observes many shamanistic rituals of his own invention, and it is soon revealed that Frank killed three children before he reached the age of ten himself.

The book sold well, but was greeted with a mixture of acclaim and criticism. The Irish Times called it "a work of unparalleled depravity".

== Plot ==
The story is told from the perspective of 16-year-old Frank Cauldhame. Frank lives with his father on a small island in rural Scotland, and he has not seen his mother in many years. There is no official record of his birth, meaning his existence is largely unknown.

Frank occupies his time with rituals, building dams, and maintaining an array of weapons (a small catapult, pipe bombs, and a crude flamethrower) for killing small animals around the island. He takes long walks to patrol the island and occasionally gets drunk with his only friend, a dwarf. Otherwise, Frank has almost no contact with the outside world. He's haunted by the memory of a dog attack during his youth, which resulted in the loss of his genitalia. He resents others for his impotence, particularly women. This is in part due to the mauling coinciding with the last time he saw his mother, who had come back to give birth to his younger brother, and left immediately afterward.

Frank's older brother, Eric, escapes from a psychiatric institution, having been arrested some years prior for arson and terrorising the local children by force-feeding them live maggots. Eric often calls him from a pay-phone to inform Frank of his progress back to the island. Eric is extremely erratic; their conversations end badly, with Eric exploding in fits of rage. However, it's clear Frank loves his brother.

The Wasp Factory is a mechanism invented by Frank, consisting of a huge clock face, salvaged from the local dump, encased in a glass box. Behind each of the 12 numerals is a trap that leads to a different ritual death (such as burning, crushing, or drowning in Frank's urine) for the wasp that Frank puts into it via the hole at the centre. Frank believes the death "chosen" by the wasp predicts something about the future. The Factory is in the house's loft, which Frank's father cannot access because of a leg injury. There are also “Sacrifice Poles” constructed by Frank. The corpses of animals, such as mice that he has killed, are placed onto the poles for the purpose of attracting birds which will fly away and alert Frank to anybody approaching the island.

It's revealed that when Frank was much younger, he killed three of his relatives: two cousins and his younger half-brother. He also exhumed the skull of the dog that castrated him, and uses it as part of his rituals. Eric is described as having been extremely sensitive before the incident that drove him mad: a tragic case of neglect at the hospital where Eric was a volunteer when studying to become a doctor. While attempting to feed a brain-damaged newborn with acalvaria, Eric notes how the child is unresponsive and smiling, despite usually appearing expressionless. The child's skull is held together by a metal plate over his head. Eric checks underneath the plate to find the child's exposed brain tissue infested and being consumed by day-old maggots.

Frank's father is distant and spends most of his time in his study, which he keeps locked at all times. Frank longs to know what is inside. He is used to being lied to by his father, who seemingly does it purely for his own amusement. At the end of the novel, Frank is alerted to Eric's return when he sees a dog that has been burned alive and discovers Eric's campsite. This knowledge incites Frank's father to get drunk before forgetting to conceal the keys to his study, where Frank discovers male hormone drugs, tampons, and what appears to be the remains of his own genitals in a jar. He assumes that his findings mean that his father is actually female. After disrobing his father at knifepoint, Frank discovers this is not the case. At the same time, Eric arrives. During the ensuing confrontation, Eric attempts to destroy the house by setting light to the large stock of cordite kept in the cellar. Frank stops him, and Eric runs into the distance.

Frank's father explains that it was Frank who was born a female; the hormones had been fed to him by his father since the dog attack in an experiment to see whether Frank would transition from female to male. The remains of his genitals were fake, fashioned from wax as evidence in case Frank ever questioned his father's story. It is suggested that his father's reasoning for doing this was to distance himself from the women he felt had ruined his life. In the end, Frank finds Eric, half asleep. He sits with him and considers his life up to this point and whether he should leave the island.

== Literary significance and criticism ==
The book was initially greeted with a mixture of acclaim and criticism. While the violence in the book is mostly against animals, Frank also recollects killing three younger children. The murders are described in an honest and matter-of-fact way, often with grotesque humour. The Irish Times called it "a work of unparalleled depravity." Banks' response to this criticism is that readers understood the humour of these scenes in a way that many critics did not in their reviews.

Neil Gaiman reviewed The Wasp Factory for Imagine magazine, and stated that it "will delight horror fans with its mixture of black humour and horrible, imaginative, beautiful deaths".

A 1997 poll of over 25,000 readers of The Independent listed The Wasp Factory as one of the top 100 books of the 20th century.

== Adaptations ==
In 1992, Malcolm Sutherland adapted the novel for the stage. The production was performed at the Glasgow Citizen's Theatre. It was revived in 1997 and shown in Yorkshire and London.

In 1997, Craig Warner adapted the novel into a 10-part serial (15-minute episodes) for BBC Radio 4.

In 2008, the Sutherland production went on tour again.

In 2013, the Australian producer and composer Ben Frost directed an opera adaptation of the Iain Banks novel, in which all characters are represented by three female singers.

== Release details ==
- 1984, UK, Macmillan (ISBN 0-333-36380-9), publication date 16 February 1984, hardback (first edition)
