= The Crow Road =

1992 novel by Iain Banks

- First edition
- Author: Iain Banks
- Audio read by: Peter Kenny
- Language: English
- Publisher: Scribner
- Publication date: 1992
- Publication place: Scotland
- Media type: Print (Hardback & Paperback)
- Pages: 501
- ISBN: 0-349-10323-2
- OCLC: 27936578
- Dewey Decimal: 823/.914 21
- LC Class: PR6052.A485 C76 1993

The Crow Road is a novel by the Scottish writer Iain Banks, published in 1992.

== Plot introduction ==
The novel describes Prentice McHoan's preoccupation with death, sex, his relationship with his father, unrequited love, sibling rivalry, a missing uncle, cars, alcohol and other intoxicants, and God, against the background of the Scottish landscape.

== Plot summary ==
This Bildungsroman is set in the fictional Argyll town of Gallanach, the real village of Lochgair, and in Glasgow, where the adult Prentice McHoan lives. Prentice's uncle Rory disappeared eight years previously while writing a book called The Crow Road. Prentice becomes obsessed with papers his uncle left behind and sets out to solve the mystery. Along the way he must cope with estrangement from his father, unrequited love, sibling rivalry, and failure at his studies.

The estrangement from his father concerns Prentice's belief in a higher power and purpose, and in life after death, all of which his father denies.

A parallel plot is Prentice's gradual transition from an adolescent fixation on one young woman to a more mature love for another.

Prentice's efforts to make sense of Uncle Rory's fragmentary notes and the minimal clues surrounding his disappearance mirror his efforts to understand the world and his place in it. The narrative is nonlinear, leaping back and forth with little or no warning, requiring the reader to piece things together.

== Literary significance and criticism ==
The novel combines menace (it contains an account of a "perfect murder") and dark humour (note the opening sentence: "It was the day my grandmother exploded.") with an interesting treatment of love. Banks uses multiple voices and points of view, jumping freely in both time and character. Even minor characters like Prentice's grandmother, the fictional town of Gallanach, and his family's home in Lochgair receive careful description, giving Prentice's life depth and context.

The book follows Prentice's journey of discovery about himself, those he loves, and the ways of the world.

"The Crow Road" is the name of a street in the west of Glasgow, but serves as well as a metaphor for death, as in "He's away the Crow Road". The appropriateness of this title becomes apparent as the novel progresses.

== Adaptation ==
The Crow Road was adapted for television by Bryan Elsley for the BBC in 1996.
