= Raw Spirit =

2003 book by Iain Banks

- Author: Iain Banks
- Language: English
- Publisher: Century
- Publication date: 2003
- Publication place: Scotland
- Media type: Print
- Pages: 368
- ISBN: 1-84413-195-5
- OCLC: 56468955
- Dewey Decimal: 914.11/504/86 22
- LC Class: TP605 .B36 2003

Raw Spirit: In Search of the Perfect Dram is a nonfiction book by Iain Banks, first published in 2003. It is his only nonfiction book.

The book is about whisky, or finding the perfect dram while travelling in Scotland. Other recurring themes in the book are George W. Bush, the 2003 invasion of Iraq, and Banks' love for motor vehicles.

== History ==
Banks has said that he "got a phone call from my agent saying that another publisher had come up with the idea of me going round distilleries in search of the perfect malt, and was I interested? Originally they wanted me to go round the Highlands in a black cab with some garrulous Glasgow cabbie or whatever, but we got rid of that idea and I drove myself."

== Description ==
Banks tells the story of a series of road trips in (or on) some of his extensive collection of vehicles, visiting and exploring many of Scotland's finest whiskies. From early on, he brings an unpretentious approach:

This, let's face it, is a book about one of the hardest of hard liquors and for all this Let's be mature, I just drink it for the taste not the effect, honest, Two units a day only stuff... it is, basically, a legal, exclusive, relatively expensive but very pleasant way of getting out of your head.

The book also celebrates some of Scotland's "Great Wee Roads" (and even "Daft Wee Roads") and Banks's love for driving on them.

There are long meanders into descriptions of his friends, food, wine, and Banks's contempt for Tony Blair and George W. Bush—for example:

I find myself looking at Blair and hating his self-righteous, Bush-whipped ass the way I only ever hated Thatcher before. I look at Dubya and just see a sad fuck with scared eyes; a grotesquely under-qualified-for-practically-anything daddy's boy who's had to be greased into every squalid position he's ever held in his miserable existence who might finally be starting to wake up to the idea that if the most powerful nation on Earth - like, ever, dude - can put somebody like him in power, all may not be well with the world. Dubya is that worst of all things, at least at this level of power and influence; a cast-iron, 100 per cent, complete and total loser who's somehow lucked out and made it to the very top.

Banks has said he felt more relaxed when writing this book; critics said that this comes across on reading it.

== Radio reading ==
Jimmy Chisholm read an abridgment by Laurence Wareing in the BBC Radio 4 "Book of the Week" slot between 8 December and 12 December 2003. The producer was David Young; Chisholm recorded all five of the fifteen-minute programmes on 19 November 2003.

== Bibliography ==
- Banks, Iain (2003). Raw Spirit: In Search of the Perfect Dram. London: Century. ISBN 1-84413-199-8.
