= Complicity (novel) =

1993 novel by Iain Banks

- First edition
- Author: Iain Banks
- Language: English
- Publisher: Little, Brown
- Publication date: 1993
- Publication place: Scotland
- Media type: Print (Hardback & Paperback)
- Pages: 313 pp
- ISBN: 0-349-10571-5
- OCLC: 253970112

Complicity is a novel published in 1993 by Scottish author Iain Banks.

== Plot introduction ==
Its two main characters are Cameron Colley, a journalist on a Scottish newspaper called The Caledonian (which resembles The Scotsman), and a serial murderer whose identity is a mystery. The passages dealing with the journalist are written in the first person, and those dealing with the murderer in the second person, so the novel presents, in alternate chapters, an unusual example of an unreliable narrator. The events take place mostly in and around Edinburgh.

== Plot summary ==
Colley is a "gonzo journalist" with an amphetamine habit, living in Edinburgh. He also smokes cigarettes and cannabis, drinks copious amounts of alcohol, plays computer games, and has adventurous sex with a married woman, Yvonne. He regrets his addictions and misdemeanours and occasionally tries (admittedly half-heartedly) to give them up.

Furthermore, he reflects on his awful experience of witnessing the aftermath of the massacre at the 'Highway of Death' in the Gulf War, and covers the deployment of HMS Vanguard, Britain's first Trident nuclear missile submarine.

He thinks he has a scoop when he receives anonymous phone calls about a series of mysterious deaths. Suddenly he has mysterious deaths of his own to worry about, when an editorial he wrote years before comes back to haunt him. In it, he suggested that certain named capitalist and right-wing public figures would be better hate-figures than the conventional ones of foreign leaders or domestic criminals. It seems someone is killing off the people on his list, one by one. The ingeniously sadistic murders are described in some detail.

Under suspicion by the police, Colley finds himself involved doubly in the bizarre murders when the killer is revealed. At the end of the book, Colley is diagnosed with lung cancer (a downbeat ending omitted in the film adaptation).

== Literary significance and criticism ==
Banks claimed in an interview that Complicity is "[a] bit like The Wasp Factory except without the happy ending and redeeming air of cheerfulness".

The themes of violence and substance abuse in the book, along with the grim ending, seem to point to Banks' growing pacifism. Significant sections of the novel are written in second-person narrative.

There are scenes in the book telling of the main character's time at university, which is named to be Stirling University, where Iain Banks was himself a student.

The book is dedicated to experimental writer Ellis Sharp.

== Film adaptation ==
A motion picture called Complicity (or Retribution in some markets) based on the novel was filmed in 2000.

== Bibliography ==
- Complicity, Iain Banks, Little, Brown and Company 1993, ISBN 0-349-10571-5
- Iain Banks's Complicity: A Reader's Guide, Cairns Craig, Continuum International Publishing Group 2002, ISBN 0-8264-5247-7
- An extract from the book was published in the Spring 1993 edition of the magazine Granta (#43) Best of Young British Novelists 2, ISBN 0-14-014059-X with the title Under Ice.
