= Gary Sinyor =

English film director, producer, and writer

- Born: 1962 (age 63–64); Manchester, England
- Occupations: Film director, film producer, screenwriter

Gary Sinyor (born Manchester, England, 1962) is an English film director, producer, and writer.

== Early life ==
Sinyor was raised in a Sephardic Jewish family of six children, in West Didsbury, attended Cambridge University (1983) and later attended the National Film and Television School.

== Career ==
In 1988, as writer and producer of a National Film and Television School student-film, The Unkindest Cut (1988), "a witty look at a guy who's suffering from all his Jewish mates doing far better in life than he is", director Jim Shields was nominated for BAFTA best short film.

"When The Unkindest Cut went out on the BBC, Eric Idle saw it and rang the next day and commissioned Gary's first feature film – Leon The Pig Farmer"

In 1992, as a co-writer, co-producer, and co-director of Leon the Pig Farmer (1992), he shared the FIPRESCI International Critics' Prize at the 1992 Venice Film Festival, the Chaplin Award for the best first feature from the 1992 Edinburgh International Film Festival, the 1994 Best Newcomer award from the London Critics' Circle, and the Most Promising Newcomer (shared with Vadim Jean) from the 1994 Evening Standard British Film Awards. He has since handed back his Chaplin award, after becoming involved in a dispute between the Edinburgh Festival and the Embassy of Israel in London.

The 2002 DVD release of Leon the Pig Farmer also included Sinyor's writing debut The Unkindest Cut, which had been nominated for a BAFTA as Best Short Film in 1989.

In 2010, Sinyor produced, and David Frost executive produced, for Magnet Films, Retreat (2011).

In March 2016, Sinyor's first play, NotMoses opened at the Arts Theatre in the West End of London.

In 2017, he wrote, directed and produced a psychological thriller The Unseen. It was released on 15 December 2017.

In 2020, his TV series The Jewish Enquirer was released in the UK and USA. It stars Tim Downie, Josh Howie, Lucy Montgomery, Jeany Spark, Daniel Sinyor, Geoff McGivern, and Michael Fenton Stevens.

== Filmography ==
Year	Title	Director	Writer	Producer
1988	The Unkindest Cut	No	Yes	Yes
1992	Leon the Pig Farmer	Yes	Yes	Yes
1995	Solitaire for 2	Yes	Yes	No
1997	Stiff Upper Lips	Yes	Yes	Yes
1999	The Bachelor	Yes	No	No
2000	Love Hurts (unreleased)	Yes	No	No
2005	Bob the Butler	Yes	Yes	Associate
2008	In Your Dreams	Yes	Yes	Yes
2014	United We Fall	Yes	No	No
2017	The Unseen	Yes	Yes	Yes
