= Valerie Edmond =

Scottish actress

- Born: 1967 (age 58–59); Edinburgh, Scotland
- Education: Royal Conservatoire of Scotland

Valerie Edmond (born 1969) is a Scottish actress.

Her first notable role was in The Sunshine Boys at the Royal Lyceum Theatre, directed by Maureen Lipman, soon after she graduated from the Royal Scottish Academy of Music and Drama. Lipman was sufficiently impressed to cast her again, as her secretary in an episode of the TV series Agony Again, and would later describe Edmond as "six foot tall, with the bones of a Slav, the legs of a supermodel and the heart of a small fawn" in her 1995 You Can Read Me Like a Book.

Her first leading role was the character of Ashley in the BAFTA-nominated The Crow Road, the BBC Scotland adaptation of the novel by Iain Banks. Edmond herself was nominated as Best Actress at the BAFTA Scotland Awards. She would later play the lead in the award-winning One More Kiss, directed by Vadim Jean.

== Filmography ==
| Year | Film | Role |
|---|---|---|
| 1996 | Agony Again (TV) | Catherine |
| 1996 | The Crow Road (TV) | Ashley Watt |
| 1998 | Love and Rage | Libby |
| 1998 | Kavanagh QC (TV) | Emma Taylor |
| 1999 | One More Kiss | Sarah |
| 2000 | Saving Grace | Nicky |
| 2000 | The Vice (TV) | D.I. Greer |
| 2000 | Complicity | Josephine Boyle |
| 2002 | The Honeytrap | Renée |
| 2003 | The Deal | Sheena McDonald |
| 2004 | The Last Chancers (TV) | Liv |
| 2004 | Foyle's War (TV) episode "A War of Nerves" | Lucinda Sheridan |
| 2008 | Made of Honor | Cousin Kelly |
| 2008 | Meta4orce (TV) | Stream |
| 2012 | Lip Service (TV) | Jo Glass |
