= Hickie =

Hickie is the surname of the following people

- Darryl Hickie (born in 1964), Canadian provincial politician
- Denis Hickie (born in 1976), Irish rugby player
- Gavin Hickie (born in 1980), American head coach of rugby`
- Gordon Hickie (born in 1948), Scottish cinematographer
- Jimmy Hickie (1915-1973), Scottish footballer
- Tahlia Hickie (born in 2000), Australian rules footballer
- William Hickie (1865-1950), British Army officer and politician
