= Mark Frankel =

English actor (1962–1996)

- Born: Mark David Frankel; 13 June 1962; London, England
- Died: 24 September 1996 (aged 34); Chiswick, London, England
- Occupation: Actor
- Years active: 1991–1996
- Spouse: Caroline Besson (m. 1991)
- Children: 2, including Fabien Frankel

Mark David Frankel (13 June 1962 – 24 September 1996) was an English actor, known for his leading roles in the British film Leon the Pig Farmer and the American TV series Kindred: The Embraced.

== Early life ==
Frankel was born on 13 June 1962 in London, where he was raised. He was the son of David Lionel Frankel, a former Royal Air Force pilot, and Grace Marshall. His grandmother was a concert pianist, and his grandfather was a prominent violinist and conductor. His father's family were Jewish emigrants from Poland and Russia into the East End. His mother was an Iraqi from a Jewish family from Baghdad. He attended Frensham Heights School.

Frankel was cast in his first professional theatre role at age 10, but he gave up acting at age 16 to focus on school. When he was 20, he returned to the theatre. He studied amateur dramatics, took numerous classes, and studied with Jack Walzer from the Actors Studio in New York. He then decided to attend drama school for classical training. He was awarded a full three-year scholarship to the Webber Douglas Academy of Dramatic Art.

== Career ==
It was during a performance in a play that he was spotted by a British casting agent and cast in the TNT mini-series A Season of Giants, winning the lead role of Michelangelo over more than 80 actors screen-testing for the part. The mini-series took Frankel on location to Italy, where he spent five months filming and working with F. Murray Abraham, John Glover, Ian Holm, and Steven Berkoff. Frankel described his first big break: "After graduation, while doing four plays in London, I auditioned for a film called A Season of Giants which was a TNT film about the life of Michelangelo. That same evening the director came to my play and asked me to star in his film. That was my first big break. It was very exciting because I had been out of drama school for only a month."

Frankel also appeared in the episode "Maigret and the Mad Woman" of Maigret, and TNT's Young Catherine playing the role of Count Orlov.

Frankel's feature film credits include the title role in Leon the Pig Farmer, which was released in Europe in 1993 and won the Critics Award at the Venice Film Festival and the Charlie Chaplin Award at the Edinburgh Film Festival that same year.

After Leon the Pig Farmer, Frankel relocated to Hollywood. After ten days, his manager had set up some meetings for him, one with the casting director of Sisters. He was offered the role of "Simon Bolt." At first, he declined because he did not want to commit to a regular TV series; he wanted the freedom to pursue other opportunities. However, the producers continued to pursue him, and he eventually accepted.

Other feature film credits include Roseanna's Grave with Jean Reno and Mercedes Ruehl, and Solitaire for Two with Amanda Pays. Other television credits include the starring roles of Carlton Dial in Fortune Hunter and Julian Luna in Kindred: The Embraced, both for the Fox Network.

Frankel also appeared in the London stage productions of A Streetcar Named Desire in the role of Stanley Kowalski, Days of Cavafy, and as the titular character in Agamemnon. Additionally, he played the lead roles in Little Hands, Sentimental, and A Private Death.

== Personal life ==
In 1990, Frankel's older brother Joe died in an aircraft accident.

In 1991, he married French advertising account executive Caroline Besson. They had two children, Fabien and Max. Their second son was born after Frankel's death.

== Death ==
On 24 September 1996, the 34-year-old Frankel died in a traffic crash from injuries sustained when he was hit by a lorry driver.

The funeral service was carried out at Kingston Liberal Synagogue and was attended by friends, co-stars, and professional colleagues, including actor Jason Isaacs and director Gary Sinyor.

== Filmography ==
=== Film ===
Year	Title	Role
1991	Mezzaestate	
1992	Leon the Pig Farmer	Leon Geller
1995	Solitaire for 2	Daniel Becker
1997	Roseanna's Grave	Antonio (final film role)

=== Television ===
Year	Title	Role	Notes
1991	A Season of Giants	Michelangelo	TV movie
1991	Young Catherine	Count Gregory Orlov	TV movie
1992	Maigret	Marcel	Episode: "Maigret and the Mad Woman"
1992–93	Sisters	Simon Bolt	Recurring role
1994	The Ruth Rendell Mysteries	Andrew Fielding	Episode: "Vanity Dies Hard"
1994	Fortune Hunter	Carlton Dial	Series regular
1995	Clair de Lune	Terry Devane	TV movie
1996	Kindred: The Embraced	Julian Luna	Series regular (final TV role)
