= One More Kiss =

One More Kiss may refer to:

== Film and TV ==
- One More Kiss (film), 2000 Scottish film with Gerard Butler
- One More Kiss (Desperate Housewives)

== Music ==
- "One More Kiss", song by Stephen Sondheim from the musical Follies
- "One More Kiss", song by Paul McCartney and Wings, from the 1973 album Red Rose Speedway
- "One More Kiss", song by Meat Loaf from 1986 album Blind Before I Stop
- "One More Kiss", song by Johnny "Guitar" Watson written by Johnny Watson
- "One More Kiss", song by Jimmy Dorsey
- "One More Kiss", song by Jim Hall (musician)
- "One More Kiss", song by Deniece Williams, Glass, Williams. from 1996 album Love Solves It All
- "One More Kiss, Dear", song by Peter Skellern and Vangelis from the Blade Runner soundtrack
