= All That Glitters (2026 film) =

Feature Film

- Directed by: Peter Lavery
- Written by: Peter Lavery
- Produced by: Joe Andrews
- Starring: Elliot Grihault; Paul Ready; Flo Thompstone; Tim Downie
- Cinematography: Nicole Atalla
- Edited by: Grainne Gavigan; Eoin McDonagh
- Music by: Michael Fleming
- Production companies: Clover Fox Films; Elevation Films; Bandit Films
- Release date: 27 February 2026 (Dublin International Film Festival)
- Running time: 100 minutes
- Country: United Kingdom
- Language: English

All That Glitters is a 2026 independent British coming-of-age comedy drama written and directed by Peter Lavery. The cast includes Paul Ready, Tim Downie, Elliot Grihault, and Flo Thompstone. The film follows Ryan, a hapless romantic, who enlists the ghost of Shakespeare to help get the role of Romeo in the school play and win over his Juliet. The film is produced by Joe Andrews and marks the debut feature film from Clover Fox Films. The film had its world premiere at the Dublin International Film Festival on 27 February 2026.

== Premise ==
Ryan, a teenage boy, struggles to find his place at school and at home with his father, who is also his English teacher. After a heated argument, Ryan conjures the ghost of Shakespeare and gets a chance to step into the spotlight and win over the girl he admires.

== Cast ==
- Elliot Grihault as Ryan
- Paul Ready as William Shakespeare
- Flo Thompstone as Jasmine
- Tim Downie as Philip
- Anya Preston as Cassie
- Rudi Goodman as Fred
- Mark Lavery as Billy
- James Craven as Hugo

== Production ==
The film marks Peter Lavery's directorial debut. Principal photography concluded in the summer of 2024, in Worcestershire UK, with Nicole Atalla as cinematographer. The film was executive produced by Elevation Films and Bandit Films. The film is edited by Gráinne Gavigan and Eoin McDonagh and features an original score by Michael Fleming. Casting was carried out by Rob Kelly.

== Release ==
All That Glitters world premiered at the Dublin International Film Festival on 27th February 2026. The film subsequently screened at the 37th Dinard British and Irish Film Festival in France as part of the festivals Families program. It was selected for the festivals Dinard a Paris programme, which took place in Paris from the 16th to the 18th October 2026.

On November 6th 2026 the filmed screened as the opening-night film of the Birmingham Film Festival, marking its UK premiere.

Screenbound International Pictures acquired the films worldwide sales rights ahead of the 2026 Cannes Film Festival. Screenbound Pictures is distributing the film theatrically in the UK and Ireland, with a cinema release scheduled for 22nd January 2027.

== Reception ==
The film has received a positive reception, being described as "a gold-standard film that sparkles on screen" by Matthew Briody at Film Ireland, and "charming, heartfelt, moving and much else" by Luke Maxwell at the Dublin Inquirer.

French reviewer Abus De Cine called it "A romantic comedy with undeniable charm".
