= KTE =

KTE may refer to:

- Kindred: The Embraced, an American science fiction television series
- Knuckles the Echidna, a character in the Sonic the Hedgehog video game series
- Kecskeméti TE, a Hungarian football team that currently plays at the first division of Hungary
- Katni Junction railway station, India (station code: KTE)
