= Love and Rage (1998 film) =

1998 drama film directed by Cathal Black

Love and Rage is a 1998 British-Irish-German drama film directed by Cathal Black and starring Greta Scacchi, Daniel Craig and Stephen Dillane. It is based on the novel The Playboy and the Yellow Lady by James Carney.

The book was inspired by a true story and it was partially filmed in the home where the actual events occurred.

== Plot ==
DVD cover

James Lynchehaun (Daniel Craig) works at the estate of Agnes MacDonnell (Greta Scacchi), a wealthy Englishwoman in late 1800s Ireland. Agnes considers her privacy important, but shows flashes of a high-spirited nature among those she trusts, and enjoys scandalizing the locals by being a divorced woman who smokes, drinks, and rides horses astride on her vast property. When James discovers that a local land agent has been cheating Agnes, he shares the information with her. She's grateful to him and they get to know each other a bit better, leading in time to a romantic relationship. James is younger than she is, and beneath her social status, but Agnes is a woman who thrives on being seen as scandalous, so she enters into the affair with relish and delight. James is a wild man, as well as a bit of a con artist, appearing at the estate in disguise and meeting Agnes dressed as a priest. Agnes doesn't appear to mind this, and at times even actively welcomes it. The fact that they both seem to delight in taunting "proper" society seems to please her that much more.

James soon begins displaying a rather unusual bent. As time passes his wild behavior becomes more and more erratic, and eventually it becomes downright scary. What starts as erotic play-acting grows into something more sinister, and in time James's actions become less amusing and more threatening. He's unstable, which she realizes only after he's insinuated himself deeply into her isolated life.

== Cast ==
- Greta Scacchi as Agnes MacDonnell
- Daniel Craig as James Lynchehaun
- Stephen Dillane as Dr. Croly
- Valerie Edmond as Biddy
- Donal Donnelly as Sweeney

== Reception ==
Eddie Cockrell of Variety magazine called it "another fiercely dark pic" from Cathal Black, and "Though abrupt changes in tone and logic in the late reels rep a challenge for even the most determined [audiences], the sparks between the two leads and the roughhewn milieu could work for those who like their romances governed more by emotion than logic."

Garreth Murphy of Entertainment.ie. wrote: "The involvement of cinematographer Slawomir Idziak, who previously worked with Krzysztof Kieslowski on Three Colours: Blue, lends class to the proceedings but the script and direction are somewhat cumbersome and things ultimately become lost in a sea of melodrama."
