= A Season of Giants =

1990 television film directed by Jerry London

- Genre: Biography; Drama; History
- Written by: Vincenzo Labella; Julian Bond
- Directed by: Jerry London
- Starring: Mark Frankel; F. Murray Abraham; Ornella Muti
- Theme music composer: Riz Ortolani
- Original language: English

Production
- Production locations: London; Australia; Rome
- Cinematography: Daniele Nannuzzi
- Editor: John Martinelli

Original release
- Release: November 4, 1990

A Season of Giants (Italian: La primavera di Michelangelo, also known as Michelangelo: The Last Giant) is a 1990 American-Italian biographical drama television film directed by Jerry London. Based on the Vincenzo Labella's book Una stagione di giganti, it depicts real life events of Michelangelo, his youth, his approach with art, his friendship with Leonardo da Vinci and Raphael, and his involvement in great political and religious events.

== Cast ==
- Mark Frankel as Michelangelo
- John Glover as Leonardo da Vinci
- F. Murray Abraham as Pope Julius II
- Ornella Muti as Onoria
- Ian Holm as Lorenzo De Medici
- Steven Berkoff as Savonarola
- Andrea Prodan as Raphael
- Jonathan Hyde as Piero Soderini
- John Steiner as Cardinal Riario
- Ricky Tognazzi as Niccolò Machiavelli
- Julian Holloway as Aldovrandi
- Alessandro Gassman as Francesco Granacci
- Raf Vallone as Spanish Ambassador
- Pier Paolo Capponi as Burchard
- Angelo Infanti as Jacopo from Fiesole
- Anna Kanakis as Sister Ilaria
- Daniela Poggi as Bianca
- Tony Vogel as Bramante
- Giancarlo Prete as Poliziano
- Vernon Dobtcheff as Jacopo Galli
- John Hallam as Ludovico Buonarroti
- Mattia Sbragia as Lorenzo Di Pierfrancesco
- Marne Maitland as Romolino
- Venantino Venantini as Cardinal Jean de Lagraulas
- Francesca D'Aloja as Mona Lisa
- Danja Gazzara as Lucrezia Borgia
- Benito Stefanelli as the French Lieutenant
- Giuseppe Cederna as Cardiere
- Enrico Lo Verso as Scultore

== See also ==
- Cultural references to Leonardo da Vinci
