= Fortune Hunter (TV series) =

- Genre: Drama
- Created by: Steven Aspis
- Starring: Mark Frankel; John Hoffman; Kim Faze
- Composer: David Michael Frank
- Country of origin: United States
- Original language: English
- No. of seasons: 1
- No. of episodes: 13 (8 unaired)

Production
- Running time: 60 minutes
- Production companies: BBK Productions; Columbia Pictures Television

Original release
- Network: Fox
- Release: September 4 – October 2, 1994

Fortune Hunter is an American action-adventure drama series that aired on Fox in the United States from September 4 to October 2, 1994, starring Mark Frankel as spy Carlton Dial.

Of the 13 episodes produced, only five were broadcast in the US, though the series aired in its entirety in other countries. The decision to have the series air immediately after Fox NFL Sunday was a factor in the dismissal of Sandy Grushow, president of Fox Entertainment, by chairman Rupert Murdoch.

== Plot ==
The series follows the adventures of Carlton Dial (Mark Frankel), an ex-government agent who now works for the Intercept Corporation, a high-tech global recovery organization based in San Francisco, with his tech-savvy partner, Harry Flack (John Robert Hoffman). Dial's assignments take him to exotic locales and into danger to recover sought-after items–such as classified information, complex weapons systems, and endangered species, which have fallen into the wrong hands–for a fee. He takes his assignments seriously, as he is determined to keep his perfect success record intact. On these assignments, he utilizes technology such as a special contact lens that he wears, which features a built-in camera and electronic earpiece. It allows Harry, who is linked to him by computer, to see and hear everything he does and communicate with him from the Corporation's home office and relay information.

== Cast ==
=== Main ===
- Mark Frankel as Carlton Dial
- John Robert Hoffman as Harry Flack

=== Recurring ===
- Kim Faze as Yvonne

=== Guest ===
- Anne Francis as Mrs. Brady, Dial's contact at Intercept
- Dana Wheeler-Nicholson as Danielle Fabian, a Russian spy
- Chris Sarandon as Jackson Roddam, a trillionaire harboring a dangerous weapon
- Michael Shamus Wiles as Rangoon Sim
- Edward Albert as David Jarrett
- Paula Trickey as Dr. Sheila Kendall
- Wendie Jo Sperber as Nadine
- Beth Toussaint as Maggie Ford
- Barbara Carrera as President Isabella Duarte
- Emiliano Díez as Emilio Echavo
- Philip Michael Thomas as Gary Colt
- David Ackroyd as Paxton Leeds
- June Chadwick as Angel Sheriden
- Nancy Valen as Madison Reynolds
- Angela Harry as Nev Collins
- Gregory Scott Cummins as Maximillian Hess
- Lorenzo Caccialanza as Reynoldo Contia
- Bobbie Phillips as Kelly Owen
- Clive Revill as Trevor Dial
- Shari Shattuck as Christine
- Afemo Omilami as Pierre Toussant
- Dwight Schultz as Jack Sasso, Dial's new colleague after Flack's promotion
- Meg Foster as Georgia Appleton, another new colleague
- Jessica Tuck as Tricia Chamberlain, another new colleague
- Brett Rice as Nick Gunn
- Tom Atkins as Richard Bennett

== Episodes ==
No.	Title	Directed by	Written by	Original release date
1	"The Frostfire Intercept"	Lewis Teague	Steven Aspis	September 4, 1994
2	"The Aquarius Intercept"	Jefferson Kibbee	Steven Aspis	September 11, 1994
3	"Triple Cross (a.k.a. The Corkscrew Intercept)"	Tucker Gates	Jack Bernstein	September 18, 1994
4	"Hot Ice (a.k.a. The Winter Star Intercept)"	Guy Magar	Harold Apter	September 25, 1994
5	"Red Alert"	Mike Levine	Carlton Cuse	October 2, 1994
6	"Countdown"	Guy Magar	Jack Bernstein	Unaired
7	"The Alpha Team"	Lee H. Katzin	Michael Fisher	Unaired
8	"The Cursed Dagger"	Kim Manners	Jeff Kline	Unaired
9	"The Deadliest Game"	Guy Magar	Steve Aspis	Unaired
10	"Stowaway"	Ralph Hemecker	Frederick Rappaport	Unaired
11	"Sea Trial"	Lee H. Katzin	Jack Bernstein and Carlton Cuse	Unaired
12	"Body Count"	James A. Contner	John Warren	Unaired
13	"Target: Millenium"	Terrence O'Hara	Steven Aspis & Jack Bernstein (teleplay), Steven Aspis (story)	Unaired
John Robert Hoffman does not appear in this episode. His character is described as being "promoted." Dwight Schultz, Meg Foster, and Jessica Tuck are introduced as Dial's new work colleagues.

== Production ==
Fortune Hunter was created by Steve Aspis and filmed in Orlando, Florida by BBK Productions, executive produced by Carlton Cuse and Frank Lupo.

== Reception ==
Tony Scott of Variety compared Dial to James Bond, and wrote, "Drugged drinks, an evil villain, poker in evening clothes, dinner-jacketed fights, explosions, electronic machinery and familiar plotting add up to a spyorama lampoon—it's strictly second-bill action, off-the-rack dialogue, unimaginative direction and casual acting." Scott D. Pierce of the Deseret News wrote, "The pilot drags and it's too hokey, but the extremely handsome Frankel has star potential."
