= Leon the Pig Farmer =

- Directed by: Vadim Jean; Gary Sinyor
- Written by: Michael Normand; Gary Sinyor
- Produced by: Vadim Jean; Gary Sinyor
- Starring: Mark Frankel; Janet Suzman; Brian Glover; Connie Booth
- Cinematography: Gordon Hickie
- Edited by: Ewa J. Lind
- Music by: David Hughes; John Murphy
- Release date: 1992
- Running time: 104 minutes
- Country: United Kingdom
- Language: English
- Budget: £0.5 million
- Box office: £642,768 (UK)

Leon the Pig Farmer is a 1992 British comedy about a Jewish estate agent in London who discovers that thanks to an artificial insemination mishap, his real father owns a pig farm in Yorkshire. It was directed by Vadim Jean and Gary Sinyor, and starred Mark Frankel in the title role.

The film won the FIPRESCI International Critics' Prize at the 1992 Venice Film Festival, while its directors won the Best Newcomer award from the London Critics' Circle, the Most Promising Newcomer at the Evening Standard British Film Awards, and the Chaplin Award for the best first feature from the Edinburgh International Film Festival.

== Plot ==
Jewish estate agent Leon Geller, who lives in London, discovers his father is not actually local businessman Sidney Geller but Yorkshire Dales pig farmer Brian Chadwick.

== Cast ==
- Mark Frankel as Leon Geller
- Janet Suzman as Judith Geller
- Brian Glover as Brian Chadwick
- Connie Booth as Yvonne Chadwick
- David de Keyser as Sidney Geller
- Maryam D'Abo as Madeleine
- Gina Bellman as Lisa
- Vincent Riotta as Elliot Cohen
- Jean Anderson as Mrs. Samuels
- John Woodvine as Vitelli
- Annette Crosbie as Dr. Johnson
- Stephen Greif as Doctor
- Burt Kwouk as Art Collector
- Sean Pertwee as Keith Chadwick
- Bernard Bresslaw as Rabbi Hartmann
- John Phillips as Trevor
