= This Is Jinsy =

British TV comedy series (Sky Atlantic, 2010–14)

- Genre: Surreal comedy; Sitcom
- Created by: Chris Bran; Justin Chubb
- Written by: Chris Bran; Justin Chubb
- Directed by: Matt Lipsey
- Starring: Chris Bran; Justin Chubb; Alice Lowe; Janine Duvitski; Geoff McGivern; Harry Hill; Jennifer Saunders
- Country of origin: United Kingdom
- No. of series: 2
- No. of episodes: 17 (including pilot)

Production
- Executive producer: Lucy Lumsden
- Producers: Chris Carey; James Dean
- Editor: Charlie Philips
- Running time: 30 minutes
- Production company: Tiger Aspect Productions

Original release
- Network: BBC Three (pilot); Sky Atlantic (series)
- Release: 1 March 2010 – 12 February 2014

This Is Jinsy is a British comedy television series. The pilot was first broadcast on 1 March 2010 on BBC Three. The programme is about the bizarre residents of the fictional island of Jinsy which is based on Guernsey, where the two writers are from. The show was written by Chris Bran and Justin Chubb who also play the leading roles. Although the pilot episode was made for the BBC, the full series of eight episodes was picked up by Sky Atlantic. The first series began airing with a double bill on 19 September 2011 and ended on 31 October 2011. A second series was commissioned and was first broadcast on 8 January 2014.

== Cast ==
- Justin Chubb as Arbiter Maven, various
- Chris Bran as Sporall Lertock, various
- Alice Lowe as Soosan Noop
- Janine Duvitski as Mrs Goadion
- Geoff McGivern as Trince
- David Tennant as Mr Slightlyman
- Harry Hill as Joon Boolay (Series 1)
- Greg Davies as Jennitta Bishard (Series 2)
- Jennifer Saunders as The Voice of Miss Reason
- Tim Downie as Jinsy Player
- Dave Mounfield as Jinsy Player
- Emma Kennedy as Jinsy Player

== Episodes ==
=== Series 1 ===
No. in series	Title	Directed by	Written by	Guest(s)	Original release date	Viewers (millions)
Pilot	"Bandy Dog Red"	Chris Bran and Justin Chubb	Chris Bran and Justin Chubb	Christopher Fairbank	1 March 2010	-
Maven and Sporall are tasked with the historic installation of the first tesselator on Old Jinsy, a tribal island covered in brambles.
1	"Wedding Lottery"	Matt Lipsey	Chris Bran and Justin Chubb	David Tennant	19 September 2011	0.179
The islanders are married off in the wedding lottery. Maven enters Sporall into the draw.
2	"Cupboards"	Matt Lipsey	Chris Bran and Justin Chubb	Peter Serafinowicz	19 September 2011	0.100
Maven is convinced cupboard salesman Eric Dunt is their deity. Sporall is unconvinced.
3	"Beardboy"	Matt Lipsey	Chris Bran and Justin Chubb	Catherine Tate	26 September 2011	0.187
While Maven prepares for an interview with the editor of Glove Hygiene Monthly, the beard-growing contest is disrupted by an attacker with a taste for facial hair.
4	"Ool Bat"	Matt Lipsey	Chris Bran and Justin Chubb	Kevin Eldon, KT Tunstall and Adam Gillen	3 October 2011	0.111
An environmentalist threatens to scupper Maven's project for a new bridge in the shape of his nose.
5	"Nameworm"	Matt Lipsey	Chris Bran and Justin Chubb	Simon Callow and Nigel Planer	11 October 2011	0.096
Maven embarks on a journey in treacherous winter conditions accompanied by a former teacher, who torments him on the way.
6	"Vel"	Matt Lipsey	Chris Bran and Justin Chubb	Jane Horrocks, Don Warrington and Marek Larwood	17 October 2011	0.114
Maven attempts to cheat in order to join Jinsy's Intellectual Elite.
7	"Zoop"	Matt Lipsey	Chris Bran and Justin Chubb	Marcia Warren	24 October 2011	0.089
After a banned rock band plan to break the Arbiter's rules, Maven himself tries to foil their plans.
8	"Kelpman"	Matt Lipsey	Chris Bran and Justin Chubb	Brian Murphy and Colin Hoult	31 October 2011	0.088
Maven becomes the highlight of Jinsy as he tries to fix a desolate tessellator. Meanwhile, Sporall discovers a new form of entertainment.

=== Series 2 ===
No. in series	Title	Directed by	Written by	Guest(s)	Original release date	Viewers (millions)
1	"Intelligent Hair"	Matt Lipsey	Chris Bran and Justin Chubb	Stephen Fry	8 January 2014	0.067
Maven's annual Arbiter ceremony goes catastrophically wrong when the historic wig used to crown him suddenly becomes reanimated.
2	"Acco!"	Matt Lipsey	Chris Bran and Justin Chubb	Ben Miller	8 January 2014	0.063
Time is of the essence as Maven races against the clocks to get his accounts done in time. The only problem is, Jinsy's ink-addicted accountants have gone feral, forcing him to strike a deal with the Chief Accountant involving his daughter, Berpetta.
3	"Double Duck"	Matt Lipsey	Chris Bran and Justin Chubb	Katy Brand	15 January 2014	0.049
Maven and Sporall are in high spirits as they attend Jinsy's Firelock Festival, but the mood soon sours when they stop by to see Madame Astralina. The local astrologer specialises in rat bum-reading and she's got some dire news to share with poor Maven: he's going to be assassinated.
4	"Penny's Pendant"	Matt Lipsey	Chris Bran and Justin Chubb	Eileen Atkins	22 January 2014	0.058
Decency levels may have plummeted from Mildly Vulgar to Severely Smutty across the island, but Maven is refusing to let his slip.
5	"Nightly Bye"	Matt Lipsey	Chris Bran and Justin Chubb	Rob Brydon	29 January 2014	0.041
Party pooper Maven is dreading the arrival of forbidden festival Nacken, so much so that he's being extra vigilant about everyone taking their nightly bye pills.
6	"Speckled Pom Pom"	Matt Lipsey	Chris Bran and Justin Chubb	Stephen Mangan, Debbie Chazen and KT Tunstall	5 February 2014	0.052
Preferring crackpot theories to common sense, Maven is convinced that the island is going to be overthrown by a group of subversive residents communicating via coded textile messaging. His evidence? The number of islanders wearing novelty knitwear.
7	"Population 791"	Matt Lipsey	Chris Bran and Justin Chubb	Derek Jacobi	12 February 2014	0.078
The Great He orders Maven to dispose of a resident when the island population exceeds its limit of 791. Favourite for the chop is Jinsy's oldest inhabitant, the romper suit-wearing Robunce Barnatty, but an unexpected revelation changes everything.
8	"The Golden Woggle"	Matt Lipsey	Chris Bran and Justin Chubb	Phil Davis and Olivia Colman	12 February 2014	0.062
Maven is shocked to discover that he's been wearing a makeshift woggle and sets out to retrieve the official one from former Arbiter, Roley Jenkins. Obstacles arise, however, in the form of his wife Joan and a pesky parrot.

== Production ==
The pilot of This Is Jinsy was produced by the Welded Tandem Picture Company and filmed at Greenford Studios in July 2009. It was directed by Chris Bran and Justin Chubb; the script editor was Emma Kennedy.

Production for the first series started at the end of January 2011 and was directed by Matt Lipsey. Charlie Phillips, who worked with Lipsey on Psychoville, is the editor.

== Reception ==
The Radio Times described the pilot as "infectiously funny as an overstuffed owl. A full series please." Time Out described it as "a lo-fi joy to behold".

Alice-Azania Jarvis, reviewing the first two episodes for The Independent, calls it "brilliantly done" and "genuinely surreal". Keith Watson writes in The Metro, Bran and Chubb "teetered on the brink of drowning in the ocean of whimsy", but that "This Is Jinsy pulled off the trick of turning its multifarious influences into something that felt fresh and new."

== Awards ==
The pilot episode (directed by Bran & Chubb) was nominated in the Sitcom category for the Rose d'Or 2010.

Series 1 of This Is Jinsy (directed by Matt Lipsey) was nominated in the Best Sketch Show category for the British Comedy Awards 2011.
