= Out of Tune (TV series) =

- Genre: Comedy
- Created by: John Sayle
- Starring: Jane Danson; Tim Downie; Jotham Annan; Louise Sullivan; Thomas Maher; John Waterhouse; Nick Maloney; John Labanowski; Jonathan Praeger; Lianne Islin; James Corden; Rebecca Clarke; Charlie Brooks
- Country of origin: United Kingdom
- Original language: English
- No. of series: 3
- No. of episodes: 40

Production
- Running time: 25 minutes

Original release
- Network: CBBC
- Release: 14 February 1996 – 9 June 1998

Out of Tune is a British children's TV sitcom which was shown on CBBC from 1996 to 1998.

The show revolves around a group of fictional children who are part of a church choir at a school, focusing on their humorous misadventures during practice sessions. The choir is comically inept and their practices are frequently disrupted by various events. The show aired on BBC1 at 4:35pm on Tuesdays and Wednesdays, spanning 40 episodes across three series. The first series started on 14 February 1996 and finished on 4 June later that year. The last episode was aired on 9 June 1998.

== Ratings (CBBC Channel) ==
Sunday 10 March 2002: 30,000
