= Hapless =

- Written by: Gary Sinyor
- Directed by: Gary Sinyor
- Starring: Tim Downie; Josh Howie; Lucy Montgomery
- Country of origin: United Kingdom
- Original language: English
- No. of series: 2
- No. of episodes: 14

Production
- Producers: Gary Sinyor; Tim Downie
- Editor: Des Latouche
- Running time: 30 minutes

Original release
- Network: Amazon Prime Video
- Release: 28 February 2020

Hapless is a British comedy television series written directed and produced by Gary Sinyor. It premiered on Amazon Prime Video on 28 February 2020 in the UK and Ireland, followed by release in the United States on 30 March 2020. It then launched on Netflix in the UK and Ireland on 1 November 2021.

On 15 May 2023 the second season (8 episodes) was released on Amazon Prime Video to 5-star reviews in The Daily Mail and The Daily Star. The Sun called the second season "painfully funny". The Jewish Chronicle called the second season "unhurried, deliberately discomforting". Jewish Community Centre Finchley called the second season "rude, irreverent laugh-out-loud". The Daily Express, The Observer and The Times compared it to Curb Your Enthusiasm. In season two, guest stars include Ronni Ancona, Sally Phillips, Linda Robson, Matt Tebbutt, and Stephen Wight.

== Premise ==
Hapless follows the Finchley life of Paul Green who is an investigative journalist for The Jewish Enquirer, described as "the 4th biggest Jewish publication in the UK", after The Jewish Chronicle, Jewish News, and Jewish Telegraph.

== Cast ==
- Tim Downie as Paul Green
- Josh Howie as Simon
- Lucy Montgomery (series 1) as Naomi Isaacs
- Jeany Spark (series 2) as Naomi Isaacs
- Daniel Sinyor as Joshie Isaacs
- Geoff McGivern (series 1) as Ronnie Green
- Michael Fenton Stevens (series 2) as Ronnie Green

== Release ==
Sinyor originally released the first series on Amazon Prime Video, under the title The Jewish Enquirer, later Channel 5 bought the rights to the independently-made comedy for its on-demand My5.

Both series were released by Peacock in the USA in April 2024.

== Reception ==
The show has been likened to Curb Your Enthusiasm and Alan Partridge. Front Row called the show "Seinfeld in North London". The Times of Israel compared the character of Paul Green to Larry David in Curb Your Enthusiasm and John Cleese's Basil Fawlty in Fawlty Towers.

The show was scheduled to appear in British Airways' in-flight entertainment offerings starting in December 2023. Due to the Gaza war, it was pulled from the schedule, with an explanation of maintaining neutrality. After an uproar about antisemitism, the airline apologized for the misstep, and rescheduled it for January 2024.

The New York Post said it was "outrageous, unflinching and funny — but never predictable."
