= Roseanna's Grave =

1997 film by Paul Weiland

- DVD cover under the title For Roseanna
- Directed by: Paul Weiland
- Written by: Saul Turteltaub
- Produced by: Alison Owen; Dario Poloni
- Starring: Jean Reno; Mercedes Ruehl; Polly Walker; Mark Frankel
- Cinematography: Henry Braham
- Edited by: Martin Walsh
- Music by: Trevor Jones
- Production companies: Spelling Films; Trijbits & Worrell Film &TV
- Distributed by: Fine Line Features (United States); PolyGram Filmed Entertainment (United Kingdom and France)
- Release date: June 18, 1997
- Running time: 98 min.
- Countries: United Kingdom; United States
- Language: English
- Box office: $123,330

Roseanna's Grave (also known as For Roseanna) is a 1997 romantic comedy-drama film directed by Paul Weiland. In his review, Roger Ebert concludes that Roseanna's Grave "isn't of much consequence, perhaps, and the gears of the plot are occasionally visible as they turn. But it's a small, sweet film that never tries for more than it's sure of, and the actors find it such a relief to be playing such goodhearted characters that we can almost feel it."

== Plot ==
Roseanna is dying of a heart condition, and all she wants is to be buried next to her daughter, in a cemetery that is getting full fast. The cemetery can't expand because Capestro, the man who owns the land next to the cemetery, won't sell. While Marcello is doing good deeds to make sure no one dies, Roseanna thinks of Marcello's future.

== Cast ==
- Jean Reno as Marcello
- Mercedes Ruehl as Roseanna
- Polly Walker as Cecilia
- Mark Frankel as Antonio
- Luigi Diberti as Capestro
- Trevor Peacock as Fredo Iaccoponi
- Fay Ripley as Francesca
- George Rossi as Sergeant Baggio
- Alfredo Varelli as Shop Owner

== Reception ==
On the review aggregator website Rotten Tomatoes, 38% of 8 critics' reviews are positive.
