= One More Kiss (film) =

2000 film by Vadim Jean

- Directed by: Vadim Jean
- Written by: Suzie Halewood
- Produced by: Vadim Jean; Paul Brooks
- Starring: Valerie Edmond; Gerard Butler; James Cosmo
- Edited by: Joe McNally
- Music by: David A. Hughes; John Murphy
- Distributed by: The Mob Film Company
- Release date: 18 February 2000
- Running time: 97 minutes
- Country: Scotland
- Languages: English; Scots

One More Kiss is a Scottish romantic drama directed by Vadim Jean, starring Valerie Edmond, Gerard Butler and James Cosmo. The film's story revolves around a cancer-diagnosed woman who decides to live her remaining life to the full, which includes throwing herself into a love triangle with an old flame.

== Plot ==
When Sarah Hopson (Valerie Edmond) discovers she has brain-stem carcinomas (a brain tumour), she leaves her successful high-rise lifestyle in New York City, returning to her hometown in the Scottish Borders, as she has little time left to live.

That is where Sarah left her widowed father Frank (James Cosmo) and her childhood sweetheart Sam (Gerard Butler) to pursue a career in the United States seven years ago. Her father's house is right behind the sea wall and the beach in Berwick, a border town between Scotland and England. Frank has spent these years essentially sitting around waiting to die. So she tries to mend things with her physically present but emotionally inexpressive dad. Sarah's return forces him to start living again.

Upon arriving Sarah finds out that Sam, a restaurateur, is now happily married to Charlotte (Valerie Gogan). This, however, does not prevent her from asking a last favour – to permit Sarah to spend her remaining time in the company of the only man she has ever loved. Charlotte is not supportive but Sam does it anyway. He still loves her, and arranges to spend as much time with her as possible doing many of the things she always wanted to do before she dies.

Sam is a rare man who shows true compassion for the young girl suffering from cancer. Her bucket list includes flying a kite, skydiving, seeing the pyramids, etc. The more time they spend together the closer they become, as they recall memories.

We see inside a therapy group for cancer sufferers, and meet a 24 year old guy who rages because he never had a chance to do anything with his life. We see Sarah go through a range of emotions as she faces her mortality. She teaches not to take life for granted and to live it to the fullest.

Sarah even prepares a speech, which she records, to be shown at the reception after her funeral. And she asks Sam (as he is a chef) to prepare a meal for 30 of her dearest friends and relatives. In Sarah's videoed farewell speech, she asks them not to cry, and says to seize the day, quoting Dylan Thomas, "Do not go gentle into that good night. Rage, rage against the dying of the light."

The story is a quiet, gentle one. It doesn't focus on sickness or death but on life, and tells you to make every day count, to get out of life all you can, while you still can.

== Cast ==
- Valerie Edmond as Sarah
- Gerard Butler as Sam
- James Cosmo as Frank
- Valerie Gogan as Charlotte
- Carl Proctor as Barry
- Danny Nussbaum as Jude
- Dilys Miller as Mary
- Ron Guthrie as Robin
- R Gary Robson as Gary the kitchen porter
- Michael Murray as Market stall holder
- Lori Manningham as Michael Angello, Frank's dog
- Hugh Wilson as Frank's false teeth
- Robin Galloway as Shirley (voice) (as Robyn Calloway)
- Oscar Fullane as Chef (as Oscar Fullone)
- Simon Tickner as Chef
- Julian Jensen as Opera singer
- Kim Hicks (and Tim Francis) as Opera lovers on stage
- Nigel Pegram as Opera buff
- Andrew Townsley as Doctor Frith (as Andrew Townley)
- Collette King as Nurse King
- Molly Maher as Young Sarah

== Filming locations ==
- Edinburgh, Scotland
- Berwick upon Tweed, Northumberland, England, United Kingdom
- New York City, New York, United States

The original intention was for the film to be set in Jean's home town of Bristol, but ultimately the landscapes of Northern England and Edinburgh, Scotland were used instead – with the former being the main setting. The opening and closing sequences were shot in New York City.

== Music and soundtrack ==
The film score was composed by David A. Hughes (formerly of OMD) and John Murphy. The soundtrack also included:

- "Amor Ti Vieta" – Tito Beltrán
- "Ave Maria" – Slava
- "Beautiful Dreamer" – James Cosmo
- "Caruso" – Julian Jensen
- "Hey Boy! Hey Girl!" – Louis Prima
- "How About You" – Connie Lush
- "Roses from the South" – Royal Philharmonic Orchestra
- "Swimmers" – Mylo
- "Through the Rain" – Gavin Clarke and Paul Bacon
- "Where Do You Go To (My Lovely)" – Peter Sarstedt
- "You Fascinating You (Tu Solamente Tu)" – Connie Lush

== Release ==
Country	Date
Canada	18 September 1999 (Atlantic Film Festival)
UK	18 February 2000
Iceland	13 July 2000 (Video Premiere)
Israel	5 April 2001
Belgium	31 October 2001
Japan	31 August 2005; 21 January 2006 (DVD)
USA	6 June 2006 (DVD)

== Awards ==
Atlantic Film Festival
Year	Result	Award	Recipient
1999	Won	Audience Award	Vadim Jean
Emden International Film Festival
Year	Result	Award	Recipient
2000	Nominated	Emden Film Award	Vadim Jean

== Trivia ==
- Despite its strong subject matter and an all-Scottish cast, One More Kiss was not included in the programme of the Edinburgh International Film Festival. It held its British premiere at the London Film Festival instead.
- Jean did not deliberately pick an all-Scottish cast.
- An army of local people volunteered as extras, and the Mayor of Berwick gave up his parking space for the production vehicle.
