= Paul Ready =

British actor (born 1977)

- Born: Paul John Ready; 1977 (age 48–49); Birmingham, England
- Education: King Edward VI Five Ways School; London Academy of Music and Dramatic Art
- Occupation: Actor
- Spouse: Michelle Terry (m. 2017)
- Children: 1

Paul John Ready (born 1977) is a British actor. He is known for appearing in British television series including Utopia, Ripper Street, Motherland and MotherFatherSon. In 2018, he played the role of Rob MacDonald in the BBC television series Bodyguard and Harry Goodsir in AMC's The Terror. He received a commendation at the 2003 Ian Charleson Awards.

== Early life ==
Ready was born in Birmingham and grew up in Harborne. He attended King Edward VI Five Ways school in Bartley Green, after which he trained at London Academy of Music and Dramatic Art. His first acting performance was in a primary school production of The Willow Pattern. In secondary school, he would go on school trips to Stratford-upon-Avon to visit the theatre. He was a member of Stage2 Youth Theatre.

== Career ==
At the age of 17, Ready played Romeo in the National Youth Theatre production of Romeo and Juliet at London's Bloomsbury Theatre, opposite Rosamund Pike as Juliet.

He is a regular at the National and Royal Court theatres. Past appearances have included leading parts in Major Barbara and Saint Joan (both plays by George Bernard Shaw) and Time and the Conways by J.B. Priestley. His West End credits include One Flew Over the Cuckoo's Nest, which starred Christian Slater. In 2018 he starred as the titular character in Macbeth at the Sam Wanamaker Playhouse (2018), opposite his wife Michelle Terry as Lady Macbeth. Of his role as Macbeth the Financial Times said: "Ready is a rare bird in that he has an actorly way with oratory, but instead of keeping us at a distance from his character, it clarifies nuances and levels and paradoxically allows us in deeper." In 2020, he and Terry returned to the Sam Wanamaker Playhouse as Petruchio and Biondello respectively in The Taming of the Shrew, which had to close early due to the COVID-19 pandemic. Between January 31 and April 19, 2025 he starred in Chekhov's Three Sisters as Aleksandr Vershinin, once again alongside Terry.

Also appearing on television, Ready received notability in 2013 for his role in the television show Utopia. He is best known for his role as the special adviser to Keeley Hawes' Home Secretary in the BBC series Bodyguard and Kevin in the BBC series Motherland.

In 2018, Ready featured as Harry Goodsir, one of the lead roles in The Terror, a 10-part series based on Dan Simmons' novel, for which he was nominated for a Satellite Award. Vanity Fair said of his performance: "Ready's character is the heart of the show: despite the various calamities that have befallen him and his comrades, he still sees hope."

In 2026, he appeared in a leading role as Michael in the BBC sitcom Ann Droid.

In August 2026, Little Animals, written by and starring Ready, has its world premiere in the Traverse Theatre at the Edinburgh Fringe Festival.

== Acting credits ==
Key
†	Denotes films that have not yet been released

=== Film and television ===
Year(s)	Title	Role	Notes
1995	Angels and Insects	Tom	
2000	Doctors	Terry Hyde	Episode: "Confidential Information"
2000	Maybe Baby	Student Doctor	
2001	Princess of Thieves	Sheriff's servant	
2001	Poirot	William	Episode: "Evil Under the Sun"
2002	Plain Jane	Clerk	
2002	Heartbeat	Henry Harrison	Episode: "A Girl's Best Friend"
2002	Tipping the Velvet	Renter Alice	Miniseries
2002	Jeffrey Archer: The Truth	Paul McCartney	
2004	Life Begins	Mark	Episode: "Maggie & Phil"
2004	Blackpool	Will	1 episode
2005	Twisted Tales	Phil	Episode: "Death Metal Chronicles"
2005	Born and Bred	Abel Marl	Episode: "The Great Leap Forward"
2005	Pierrepoint	Anthony David Farrow	
2005	Trial & Retribution	Harry Cranley	Episode: "The Lovers: Part 1"
2006	Holby City	Leon Harris	Episode: "Yesterday Once More"
2006	Dresden	William	
2008	The Gravity of Belief	Mr. Bumpkin	Short film
2008	Pulling	Mike	1 episode
2011	Silk	Tony Paddick	Episode: "All Plain Sailing"
2012	Private Peaceful	Captain Wilkins	
2013	One Wrong Word	Tony	Short film
2013	The Tunnel	Benji Robertson	
2013–2014	Utopia	Lee	Recurring role
2013–2016	Ripper Street	Frederick Treves	3 episodes
2015	Cuffs	DI Felix Kane	Main cast
2016	The Complete Walk: Richard III	Second Murderer	Short film
2016	The Circuit	Danny	TV movie
2016	The Witness for the Prosecution	Tripp	
2016–2022	Motherland	Kevin Brady	Main cast
2017	Fortitude	Mark Devlin	2 episodes
2017	Beside Himself	Devlin	Short film
2017	The Death of Stalin	NKVD Officer Delov	
2018	Endeavour	Sebastian Fenix	Episode: "Quartet"
2018	Bodyguard	Rob	Supporting role
2018	The Terror	Harry Goodsir	
2019	Our Liam of Lourdes	Toby	Short film
2019	MotherFatherSon	Nick Caplan	Supporting role
2020	Muse	Aderman	Short film
2020	Flack	Damien Paulson	3 episodes
2021	The Dig	James Reid Moir	
2022	The Bastard Son & The Devil Himself	Soul O'Brien	
2023	Capture	Dad	Short film
2023	Heart of Stone	Max Bailey	
2024	Mandy	Cooper	Episode: "Destination: Dundee"
2024	A Gentleman In Moscow	Petrov	
2024	Bring Them Down	Gary	
2025	Rob & Romesh Vs	Guest	Episode: "Shakespeare"
2026	All That Glitters	Shakespeare	
2026	Ann Droid	Michael	6 episodes
TBA	Kafka's Appraisal †	Franz Kafka	Short film, unreleased

=== Radio ===
Year(s)	Title	Role	Station	Notes	Ref.
2011	A Tale of Two Cities	Sydney Carton	BBC Radio 4	4 episodes	
2012	Romeo and Juliet	Mercutio	BBC Radio 3		
2012	Twelfth Night	Orsino	BBC Radio 3		
2013	Imo and Ben	Benjamin Britten	BBC Radio 3		
2013	Sword of Honour	Guy Crouchback	BBC Radio 4	7 episodes	
2014	The Once and Future King	Arthur	BBC Radio 4	6 episodes	
2015	The Master and Margarita	Master	BBC Radio 3		
2015	The Pumpkin Eater	Jake Armitage	BBC Radio 4	5 episodes	
2018	Home Front	Johnnie Marshall	BBC Radio 4		
2022	He Do The Wasteland In Different Voices	The Poet	BBC Radio 3		
2022	Jason's Mates	Ernest Montague	BBC Radio 4		
2023	Christmas Miracle on Brighton Pier	William McFadden	BBC Radio 4		
2025	The History of Mr Polly	Alfred Polly	BBC Radio 4	2 episodes	

=== Theatre ===
Year(s)	Title	Role	Theatre	Ref.
1999	The Beggar's Opera	Filch	Wilton's Music Hall	
2000	Cuckoos	Tito	Gate Theatre	
2001	Twelfth Night	Sebastian	Liverpool Playhouse	
2001–2002	Mother Clap's Molly House	Martin	Lyttelton Theatre	
2002	Romeo and Juliet	Mercutio	Liverpool Playhouse	
2002	Crazyblackmuthafuckin'self	Colin	Royal Court Theatre	
2003	Black Milk	Levchick	Royal Court Theatre	
2003	Terrorism	Various	Royal Court Theatre	
2003	The Comedy of Errors	Dromio of Syracuse	Bristol Old Vic	
2003–2004	World Music	Tim/Young Geoff	Donmar Warehouse	
2004	Forty Winks	Charlie	Royal Court Theatre	
2005	Romance	Bernard	Almeida Theatre	
2006	One Flew Over the Cuckoo's Nest	Billy Bibbit	Garrick Theatre	
2006	Waves	Neville	National Theatre	
2007	Attempts on Her Life	Various	National Theatre	
2007	Saint Joan	Dauphin	National Theatre	
2008	Major Barbara	Adolphys Cusins	National Theatre	
2009	Love's Labour's Lost	Don Armado	Shakespeare's Globe	
2009	The Pillowman	Michal	Curve Theatre	
2009	Time and the Conways	Alan Conway	National Theatre	
2009	Three More Sleepless Nights	Pete	National Theatre	
2010	London Assurance	Charles Courtly	National Theatre	
2011	Wastwater	Mark	Royal Court Theatre	
2011	A Woman Killed with Kindness	John Frankford	National Theatre	
2011–2012	Noises Off	Tim Allgood	The Old Vic	
2012–2013	In the Republic of Happiness	Bob	Royal Court Theatre	
2014	Black Comedy	Brindsley	Chichester Festival Theatre	
2014	Much Ado About Nothing	Benedick	Royal Exchange, Manchester	
2015	Measure for Measure	Angelo	Young Vic	
2018/19	Macbeth	Macbeth	Sam Wanamaker Playhouse	
2020	The Taming of the Shrew	Petruchio	Sam Wanamaker Playhouse	
2020	Macbeth: A Conjuring	Macbeth	Sam Wanamaker Playhouse	
2020	Deep Night, Dark Night	Actor	Sam Wanamaker Playhouse	
2022	King Lear	King Lear (cover)	Shakespeare's Globe	
2022	The Contingency Plan: Resilience	Christopher	Crucible Theatre	
2023	Twelfth Night: For One Night Only	Sir Andrew Aguecheek	Shakespeare's Globe	
2024	The Duchess (of Malfi)	The Cardinal	Trafalgar Theatre	
2024	Little Animals	Richard / Writer	Beckenham Place Mansion	
2025	Three Sisters	Aleksandr Vershinin	Sam Wanamaker Playhouse	
2025	A Midsummer Night's Dream: For One Night Only	Theseus/Oberon	Shakespeare's Globe	
2026	Summerfolk	Sergei Bassov	National Theatre	
2026	Little Animals	Richard / Writer	Sam Wanamaker Playhouse	
2026	Little Animals	Richard / Writer	Edinburgh Fringe Festival	

== Awards and nominations ==
Year	Award	Category	Nominated work	Result
2019	Satellite Awards	Best Supporting Actor in a Series, Miniseries or TV Film	The Terror	Nominated
