= Tim Downie =

English actor and writer

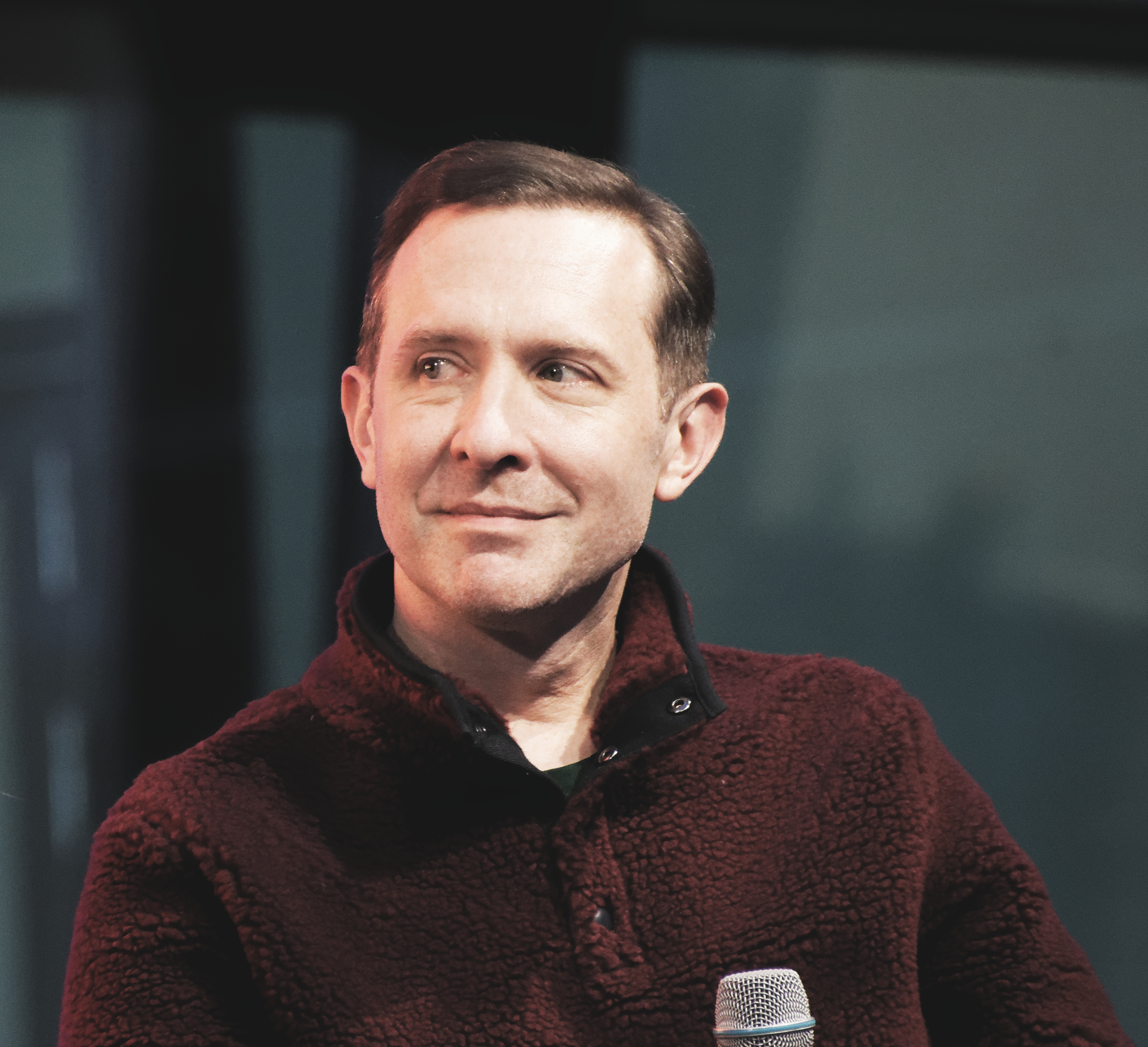
- Downie at ComicCon 2024
- Born: Timothy Richard Downie; 14 July 1977 (age 49); Hitchin, Hertfordshire, England
- Education: Mountview Academy of Theatre Arts
- Occupations: Actor; writer
- Years active: 1993–present

Timothy Richard Downie (born 14 July 1977) is an English actor and writer. He is known for the television series Toast of London, Outlander and Upstart Crow, the films Paddington and The King's Speech, and the video game Baldur's Gate 3. Downie was born in Hitchin, Hertfordshire. Before starting his professional career, he trained at the Mountview Academy of Theatre Arts.

== Career ==
=== Television ===
Downie's first television appearance was in 1994 in an episode of ITV's police drama The Bill, followed by a guest spot on the series two premiere of ITV's comedy Conjugal Rites. In 1996 he joined the cast of CBBC's Out of Tune, a children's sitcom which focused on the lives of the member of a church choir, alongside James Corden and Jane Danson. He would go on to appear on BBC One's teenage game show To Me... To You... in 1998 before landing the role of Sam Smallwood in a year-long stint on Channel 4's soap opera Hollyoaks. Next he would guest star in an episode of BBC One's courtroom drama Judge John Deed (2001) as Constable Hoskins.

In 2002, Downie joined the cast of BBC's series Doctors, portraying Alex North in 2 episodes of the drama. 2004 saw him guest star on Fox Network's action/comedy Keen Eddie, which centered on an NYPD officer stationed in London, and the BBC's crime procedural New Tricks, which followed an Unsolved Crime and Open Case Squad (UCOS) of London's Metropolitan Police Service. From there he would guest star on CBBC's teenage drama M.I.High in the series two finale titled "Asteroid Attack" (2008) and BBC's sitcom The Legend of Dick and Dom in a series one episode titled "The Tears of Fury". In 2009, Downie co-starred in BBC Four's Micro Men, a comedic account of the rivalry between 1980's British computer giants Sir Clive Sinclair and Chris Curry, opposite Martin Freeman and Alexander Armstrong. For the next two years, between 2010 and 2011, Downie would star with fellow actor Sam Heughan in a series of television commercials as part of an ad campaign for Tennents Lager in the UK.

Beginning in 2011, Tim appeared as Yates, opposite David Jason, in the BBC comedy series The Royal Bodyguard, which followed the misadventures of a clumsy officer who was appointed as the Queen's new bodyguard. That same year he was cast in Sky Atlantic's comedy This is Jinsy, the first series of which was nominated for the British Comedy Awards for Best Sketch Show. Downie would also appear in the second series three years later. 2012 would see Downie appear in several television productions. First was the television film The Cricklewood Greats, a spoof documentary of the early British film industry for BBC Four, which saw him star opposite Peter Capaldi. He would next feature in episode one of ITV's mini-series Titanic, which was released to coincide with the one hundredth anniversary of the tragedy. Downie would finish out the year with appearances in Channel 4's mismatched roommate sitcom Peep Show, ITV's anthology series Little Crackers, which featured one-off comedies or dramas revolving around the theme of famous people's Christmas memories, and the first of a three-year stint as Danny Bear on Channel 4's comedy Toast of London.

BBC's comedy Miranda, saw Downie guest star in 2013. From there he went on to appearances in BBC Two's veterinarian sitcom Heading Out, the two-part series seven premiere of E4's hit Skins, a regular role in BBC One's sitcom Father Figure, and an appearance in BBC Two's BAFTA nominated short children's program Found. In 2015 Tim made a cameo appearance in Dave TV's mockumentary series Hoff the Record, which was loosely based upon the life of actor David Hasslehoff. That same year he would appear in an episode of ITV's mini-series Jekyll and Hyde and episode three of E4's science fiction comedy series Tripped.

Downie would begin 2016 with a role in series three of ITV Two's sitcom Plebs, which followed the adventures of three men living in Rome. He would go on to appeare in the made-for-television film Young Hyacinth, a prequel to BBC One's sitcom Keeping Up Appearances, an episode of Channel 4's online short video vehicle Comedy Blaps entitled Filcher & Crook, several episodes of Comedy Central's Drunk History: UK, and a regular role as Christopher (Kit) Marlowe in Ben Elton's ongoing sitcom Upstart Crow. The next year, Downie featured in an episode of BBC's comedy Count Arthur Strong, opposite comedian and writer Steve Delaney, an episode of E4's comedy of innocence Chewing Gum, and an episode of Comedy Central's sitcom I Live with Models.

2018 saw Downie cast as recurring character, and real-life historical figure, Governor William Tryon in STARZ's television adaptation of Diana Gabaldon's best selling Scottish time travel novel Outlander. Downie went on to executive produce and star in the six part-comedy The Jewish Enquirer, alongside Lucy Montgomery, in early 2020. Later that year he appeared in creators Justin Sbresni and Mark Bussell's YouTube series Housebound, which focused on ordinary life in the era of COVID-19 lockdown.

In January 2022 it was announced that Downie had joined the cast of Amazon and the BBC's Good Omens for its second series. The series was released July 2023, with Downie playing the character of Mr Brown. In 2024 he appeared as Richard Manners in the Netflix series Geek Girl.

=== Radio ===
In 2021 Downie played Kit Marlowe without parody in Jude Cook's Radio 3 drama The Rival.

=== Film ===
Downie's first professional film role was in 2002's mystery thriller Dead Man's Dream, from directors Abner Pastoll and Kamma Pastoll. Two years later he would star in director Emory Ruegg's short film Swiss Passport, which was created for the Straight 8 Competition at 2004's Soho Rushes Film Festival. That same year he would appear in the drama Shooting Shona opposite Samantha Béart. In 2008, Downie would once again work with director Abner Pastoll on his short film Homicide: Division B, a dramatic comedy about the British police, before starring in the direct-to-video horror film The Gatekeeper.

In 2010, Downie appeared as H.G. Wells in the short film A Great Mistake, which screened at Cannes Film Festival's Short Film Corner and the Shanghai International Film Festival. That same year he would feature as the Duke of Gloucester in the Academy Award winning film The King's Speech. The next year he portrayed Danny in Michael Tchoubouroff's dramatic comedy Diagnosis Superstar. He would go on, in 2012, to feature in the musical Les Misérables, opposite Eddie Redmayne and Aaron Tveit. Two years later Downie would appear as explorer Montgomery Clyde in the family film Paddington, which was based upon author Michael Bond's series of children's books.

2017 Downie appeared in three feature films. First was the Netflix original War Machine, a film which was inspired by US Army General Stanley McChrystal, opposite Brad Pitt. Second was a cameo in director Michael Bay's Transformers: The Last Knight, the fifth installment in the Transformers franchise. He would finish the year with Vertical Entertainment's hostage thriller 6 Days, which chronicled the siege of the Iranian Embassy in London by militants. The next year he would feature in independent film The Mercy, the true story of Donald Crowhurst (Colin Firth), an amateur sailor who participated in the Sunday Times Golden Globe Race in 1968. He would go on to a supporting role in the comedy I Love My Mum, from Spanish writer and director Albert Sciamma.

It was announced in 2018 that Downie had been cast in Citrus Film's Horrible Histories: The Movie - Rotten Romans, an adaptation of the best-selling children's historical comedy books from Scholastic. The film was scheduled to be released to UK and Irish theatres in July 2019 and US theatres in November. He will play Philip in the upcoming Shakespeare-based film All That Glitters.

=== Theatre ===
Downie has appeared in numerous stage productions including writer Peter Maddock's 2007 play Charlie and Henry at the New End Theatre and writer Gavin Davis' 2008 comedy Fat Christ at the King's Head Theatre in London, England. In 2010 he appeared in two different plays at the Birmingham Repertory Theatre: Lutz Hübner's German play Respect, followed by Samantha Ellis’s Jewish drama Cling To Me Like Ivy. He also appeared in1966 World Cup Final (2002) on tour around the UK, Pawnography, and Le Jet De Sang at The Rose (theatre) in London 2007, part of their first residency in 500 years. In 2015 he appeared in Hampstead Theatre’s production of writer Michael Frayn's play Matchbox Theatre.

=== Writing ===
As a writer, Downie had his first theatre piece, The Dead Moon, commissioned in 2008. The play toured the UK and was also performed at the Aldeburgh Festival, the first non-operatic piece to ever be performed there. In 2009 he was one of two finalists selected in the Heat 2, first round assignments (of 540 entries in 30 heats) in the New York Screenwriters' Challenge for his script The Robin Wins The Spring. Since then his theatre work has included The Curse of Elizabeth Faulkner for 2010's Off Cut Festival in London, which was also performed at the King's Head Theatre, and The Revenge of Anubis. In 2010 Downie penned The Story Project 2 – Love, Lies and London for The Southwark Playhouse and A Portrait of Maureen Flange for the Etcetera Theatre.

=== Video games ===
In October 22, 2020, Downie revealed on Twitter that he would be doing voice work for the video game, Baldur's Gate 3, playing the wizard, Gale Dekarios. Downie would reprise his role in a series of animated web shorts, and in two episodes of High Rollers, a Dungeons & Dragons livestream, featuring the other companion voice actors playing their respective characters.

=== Podcasts ===
Downie has hosted two podcasts, Outcasts, an unofficial Outlander podcast he made in 2020 with David Berry, another Outlander actor, and Folklands, a podcast exploring regional English folklore and history, that he has made since 2023 with fellow actor Justin Chubb.

== Filmography ==
=== Film ===
Year	Title	Character	Notes
2002	Dead Man's Dream	Video store customer	
2004	Swiss Passport	Neil	Short
2004	Shooting Shona	Art	
2004	Kay	Ollie	Short film
2008	Homicide: Division B	Detective Lonetree	Short film
2008	The Gatekeeper	Dweeb	Direct to video
2010	A Great Mistake	H. G. Wells	Short film
2010	The King's Speech	Duke of Gloucester	
2010	The Present and the Past	Chris	Short film
2011	Diagnosis Superstar	Danny	
2012	Les Misérables	Brevet	
2014	Paddington	Montgomery Clyde	
2017	War Machine	Paul Smear	
2017	Transformers: The Last Knight	Polo Player	
2017	6 Days	Jimmy	Independent film
2018	The Mercy	Style Editor	
2018	I Love My Mum	Henry Brentwood	
2018	Last Christmas	Dad	Short
2019	Horrible Histories: The Movie - Rotten Romans	British Legate	
2023	Nandor Fodor and the Talking Mongoose	Mr. Irving	
2024	Touchdown	Prime Minister	
2026	All That Glitters	Philip	Independent film

=== Television ===
Year	Title	Character	Production	Notes
1994	The Bill	Joe Paley	ITV	Episode: "Keeping Mum"
1994	Conjugal Rites	Rick Pike	ITV	Episode: "Happy Returns?"
1996–1998	Out of Tune	Street	CBBC	Series Regular, 17 episodes
1998	To Me... To You	Himself	BBC One	1 episode
1999-2000	Hollyoaks	Sam Smallwood	Channel 4	Regular role
2001	Judge John Deed	Constable Hoskins	BBC One	Episode: "Appropriate Response"
2002	Doctors	Alex North	BBC	Guest role, 2 episodes
2004	Keen Eddie	McGinnis	Fox	Episode: "Citizen Cecil"
2004	New Tricks	Dave Pimley	BBC One	Episode: "Good Work rewarded"
2008	M.I. High	Leo Taybridge	CBBC	Episode: "Asteroid Attack"
2009	The Legend of Dick and Dom	Jasper	BBC One	Episode: "The Tears of Fury"
2009	Micro Men	Tony Wood Rogers	BBC Four	Television film
2011-2012	The Royal Bodyguard	Yates	BBC	6 episodes
2011-2014	This is Jinsy	Jinsy Player	Sky Atlantic	Recurring role, 16 episodes
2012	The Cricklewood Greats	Lionel Crisp	BBC	Television film
2012	Titanic	Police Officer	ITV/ABC	Miniseries, 1 episode
2012	Peep Show	Greg	Channel 4	Episode: "Business Secrets of the Pharaohs"
2012	Little Crackers	P.C. Goodhand	ITV	Episode: "Omid Djalili's Little Cracker: The Ten Year Plan: Fringe to Hollywood"
2012-2015	Toast of London	Danny Bear	Channel 4	Recurring role, 17 episodes
2013	Miranda	Julian	BBC	Episode: "A Brief Encounter"
2013	Heading Out	Colin Stafforth	BBC Two	1 episode
2013	Skins	Mr. Jessup	E4	Episode: "Fire: part 1 & 2"
2013	Father Figure	Tim Curtain	BBC One	Recurring role, 5 episodes
2013	Found		BBC Two	Television short
2015	Hoff the Record	Dylan Turnbull	Dave	Episode: "Renew or Die"
2015	Jekyll & Hyde	Willard Neysmith	ITV	Episode: "Black Dog"
2015	Tripped	Promo Presenter	E4	Miniseries, 1 episode
2016	Plebs	Esquilinus	ITV2	Episode: "Jugball"
2016	Young Hyacinth	Freddy	BBC One	Television film
2016	Comedy Blaps	Filcher	Channel 4	Episode: "Filcher & Crook", Online
2016-2017	Drunk History: UK	Royal Society Lecturer / Admiral Pierre-Charles Villeneuve / Edward Wilson	Comedy Central	3 episodes
2016-2018	Upstart Crow	Christopher Marlowe	BBC Two	Recurring role, 19 episodes
2017	Chewing Gum	Lance	E4	Episode: "Orlando"
2017	Count Arthur Strong	Rufus	BBC	Episode: "The Lucky Streak"
2017	I Live with Models	Dub	Comedy Central	Episode: "Jess Steals a Job"
2018-2020	Outlander	Governor Tryon	Starz	Recurring role, 3 episodes
2020	Hapless	Paul Green	Amazon Prime	Series lead
2020	Housebound	Major Jeremy	YouTube	Recurring role, 5 episodes
2022	Toast of Tinseltown	Danny Bear	BBC	Recurring role, 5 episodes
2023	Good Omens	Mr Brown	Amazon Prime	Recurring role, 3 episodes
2024	Big Mood	Mr Wilson	Tubi	Guest role, 1 episode
2024	Geek Girl	Richard Manners	Netflix	Recurring role, 10 episodes
2026	Half Man	Daniel	HBO	Recurring role

=== Video games ===
Year	Title	Character	Notes
2023	Baldur's Gate 3	Gale Dekarios	

=== Theatre ===
Year	Title	Role	Director	Theatre
2007	Charlie and Henry	Mervyn	Peter Maddock	New End Theatre
2008	Fat Christ	Dick Frobisher	Heather Simpkin	King's Head Theatre
2010	Respect	Kobert	John Retallack	Birmingham Repertory Theatre
2010	Cling to Me Like Ivy	David	Sarah Esdaile	Birmingham Repertory Theatre
2015	Matchbox Theatre	Various	Hamish McColl	Hampstead Theatre

=== As writer ===
Year	Title	Notes
2008	The Dead Moon	Play
2009	The Robin Wins the Spring	New York Screenwriters' Challenge
2009	The Curse of Elizabeth Faulkner	Play
2009	The Revenge of Anubis	Play
2010	A Portrait of Maureen Flange	Play
2010	The Story Project 2 – Love, Lies and London	Play
