= The Off Cut Festival =

The Off Cut Festival is a showcase for new and undiscovered playwriting, directing and acting talent, with an emphasis on keeping the audience at the heart of the theatre experience.

It was created in 2009 by Trudi Boatwright and Daniel Brennan (artistic directors of In Company Theatre), with the first festival being held at The Old Red Lion Theatre in Angel, London. Twenty-eight short plays (24 in 2009 and 2010) run in four groups, with audience members voting for their favourite plays. The two plays in each group with the most votes go through to a final week, where the audience continues to vote until an ultimate winner is found. A panel of industry professionals attend the final night handing out awards for Writing, Directing and Ensemble Acting.

The festival was relaunched in Manchester in 2019 at the theatre 53two and returned in 2023.

== Off Cut 2009 ==
The first festival was held at The Old Red Lion Theatre in Angel, London from 29 September to 18 October. The panel was headed by Moira Buffini, and included playwrights Josephine Melville and Robert Rigby, directors Psyche Stott and Nigel Douglas, producer Andrew Robb; literary agent Anna Brewer; playwright and actor Andrew Neil and Old Red Lion Artistic directors, Helen and Damien Devine.

One hundred and ninety-six plays were submitted from all over the world.

=== Group One ===
Play	Writer	Director	Cast	Notes
Welcome to Quiz Night	John Moorhouse	Tobias Tobbel	James Clossick	
The Teacher Who Loved Me	Chantelle Dusette	Paul Blinkhorn	Emily Holden, Daniel Wiltshire	
This Just In	Darren Murphy	Darren Murphy	Denise Stephenson, Tim Lewis	Finalist - Winner Panel Award for Ensemble Acting
The Curse of Elizabeth Faulkner	Tim Downie	Anthony Coleridge		Finalist - This play has toured extensively and had an extended run at New Players Theatre in the autumn of 2013
Bugaboo	Christine Roberts	Michael Miller	Christine Edwards, Peter Mann,	
Singers	Louise Gooding	Janet Palmer	Nicholas Agnew, Ed Cooper Clarke, Stacey Evans	

=== Group Two ===
Play	Writer	Director	Cast	Notes
Juicy Cherry	Tracy Whitwell	Joss Bennathan	Ben Mars (as Ben Enright), Tracy Whitwell	Finalist
Fish and Chips Twice	Fiona Keen, Andy Pandini	Adam Morley	Gemma Seren, Christopher Tajah	
Mr Jolly Lives Next Door	Michael Stewart	Daniel Brennan	Jack Kelly	When original director became indisposed, Daniel Brennan took over at the last minute. He was not eligible for any award
No Idea	Tom Ellen	Juliane von Sivers	Matt Jamie, Mark Parsons	Finalist - Panel Award for Directing
Momentum	Craig Burrows	Lawrence Carmichael	Kerry Wootten,	
Lights Out	Jeff Nolan	Stephen Glover	Richard Kowold, Erica Thomas-Lowe	

=== Group Three ===
Play	Writer	Director	Cast	Notes
Stone Crossing	Mark Homer	Jayne Denny	Thomas Coombes, Edward Law, Elizabeth Webster	Finalist
The Perfect Girl	Øystein Ulsberg Brager	John Ward	Mark Conway	
The Hindsight Saga	Stuart Paterson	Jemma Gross	John Last, Steven Rostance,	Finalist
Something Came Out	Nicholas Pierpan			
Spud and Moose	Anneka Harry		Leanne Davis	
Human by Default	David Andrew Gregg	Louisa Fitzgerald		

=== Group Four ===
Play	Writer	Director	Cast	Notes
The Game	Julie Bower	Sophie Lifschutz	Sharon Andrew, James Marsh	
Bodyguard	Peter Drake	Oscar Toeman	Maxine Howard	
Closer to God	Anna Jordan	Anna Jordan	Peter Gordon, Ursula Early	Finalist - Panel Award for Writing; Audience Award for Best Play
The Intricate Workings of a Sherbet Lemon	Stuart Lee	Kamaal Hussian	Peter Mann, Liv Spencer	
A Wake	Julia St. John	Julia St John	Joy Blakeman, Peter McEnery,	
Like It Never Happened	Bea Appleby	Kate McGregor	Debra Baker, Graham Sterling	Finalist

=== Off Cut 2010 ===
After the unprecedented success of the first festival, it was quickly decided by all parties that a second event would run at the same venue from 21 September to 10 October. The same panel (though this time without Andrew Neil) was joined by actor Patricia Hodge, literary agent Lisa Babalis and playwright Tena Štivičić.

The Artistic Directors were joined by Nick Kneller as Producer.

This was the only year that the Off Cut producers selected a 'wild card' entry for the finals.

All actors would now be cast in collaboration with the Off Cut company, as opposed to writers and/or directors finding their own.

Four hundred and thirty-six plays were received, with writers from around the world able to submit up to four plays.

==== Group One ====
Play	Writer	Director	Cast	Notes
Balls	Mark Withers	Asia Osborne	Victoria Daniels, Gabriella Schmidt	
The Summer Display	Sheri Graubert	Katie Lewis		
True	Ewan Jeffrey	Chris O'Donnell	Lee Drage	
The Nth Degree	Bernie Shevlin	Kay Michael	Karina Sugden, Charlotte Sutherland	Shortlisted for Wild Card
Room With A Door	Alexis Boddy	Tom Latter	Brigid Lohrey, Robert Mason	Finalist
I Love Paris	Richard Fichett	Janet Palmer	Nicholas Agnew, Mark Conway	Finalist

==== Group Two ====
Play	Writer	Director	Cast	Notes
Hetherington's Box	Jonathan Brown	Helen Tennison	Freddie Machin, Panni Skrivanos, Graham Sterling,	Shortlisted for Wild Card
Mad Mary Dancin'	Doc Anderson-Bloomfield	Anna Ostergren	Sarah Flower, Tracey Kearney	
Sweet Engineering of the Lucid Mind	Mitch Féral	Alison Convey	Debra Baker, Simon Nicholas	Finalist - Panel Award for Writing, Panel Award for Directing
I Just Called	Tanja Mariadoss	Luisa Hinchliff	Kate Walsh	Finalist - Panel Award for Ensemble Acting (even though this was a one-woman play)
Shrink	Sadie Frost	Juliane von Sivers	Chandrika Chevli, Kate Russell-Smith	
Plenty of Fish in the Sea	Luke Smith	Helen Broughton	Andrew Glen,	

==== Group Three ====
Play	Writer	Director	Cast	Notes
Lactose Intolerable	Lola Stephenson	Christopher Loscher	Helen Clapp, Michael Norledge, Chloë Thorpe	Shortlisted for Wild Card
Home	Mihaela Nicolescu	Kate McCarthy	Adam Smethurst, Jennifer Tan	
On a Day Like This	John Turley	Mark Pollard	Aiden McCarthy	Finalist - Audience Award for Best Play
The Limestone Epoch	Katy Brooksbank	Eero Suojanen	Erica Thomas-Lowe,	
2... 8... 13...	Jon Petherbridge	Dawn Kalani Cowle		
Mexico Way	Tracy Whitwell	Tracy Whitwell	Olivia Caffrey, Don Gilet, Matt Jamie	Finalist

==== Group Four ====
Play	Writer	Director	Cast	Notes
If I Were You	Sophie Alderson	Charlie Henniker	Priscilla Gray, Karl Niklas,	
The Inspiration	Virginia Hayden	Martin Hackett	Jennie Lathan	Finalist
Falling Apart	Julia Bolden	Gemma Kerr	Richard Fish, Joanna Waters	
Pimp My Baby	Louise Gooding	Michael Miller	Joanna Clancy, Stanley Eldridge, Polly Hughes, Duncan Pearse	
The Trunk	Mike Carter	Scott le Crass	Stephen Brannan, Will McGeough	Finalist - Wild Card. A full-length version of this play will run at The Space (Theatre) in 2014
Rise and Shine	Joseph Murray	Gilli Foley	Harry Lobek, Naomi Reynolds	Finalist

=== Off Cut 2011 ===
After another enormously successful run, it was decided that the festival needed to move to a bigger venue. The Riverside Studios - Studio Three would be Off Cut's new home and the festival ran from 27 September to 16 October. The panel, still headed by Moira Buffini, included casting director Jo Buckingham and Rob Drummer of HighTide.

A record 722 plays were submitted for consideration.

As in previous years, 24 plays were chosen by Off Cut's reading panel. A further eight were put to a panel of theatre bloggers, who chose four to go through to the festival. The bloggers were Scott Matthewman, Ian Foster of Ought to be Clowns, video blogger Alison Child, Luke Murphy of Twespians and Havana Wellings-Longmore of Talawa Theatre Company.

To further advocate the spirit of collaboration, from this year no writer was allowed to direct their own work.

Trudi Boatwright moved back to Australia, where she is still involved in Off Cut and runs a pared-down version in Melbourne.

In Company Theatre was closed down and The Off Cut Festival became a company in its own right.

==== Group One ====
Play	Writer	Director	Cast	Notes
A Date With Doris	Jilly Gardner	Sandra Maturana	Sibéal McGuinne, Zak Rowlands	
The Poet	Alan Fielden	James O'Donnell	Scott Ainslie, Mark Moore	
Granted...	Lauren Spring	Kenneth O'Toole	Victoria Allies, Stephen Fawkes	
They F*** You Up, You're Mum and Dad	Michael O'Hanlan	Luisa Hinchliff	Lorayne Constance, David Forest, Kathy Trevelyan	Bloggers' Choice Finalist
The Wrong Tree	Wally Sewell	Brigid Lohrey	Richard Fish, Denise Stephenson, Nathan Thompson	Finalist - Panel Award for Directing
A Million Things	Tracy Harris	Nick Borsack	Eleanor Barr, Ceri Murphy, Martin Pratt	
The Viewing	Ross Howard	Tim Lee	Karsten Huttenhain, Joanne Entwistle, Stephen Kelly, Duncan Pearse	

==== Group Two ====
Play	Writer	Director	Cast	Notes
All Men Are	Rosalind Adler	Laura Vorwerg	Robert Lyon, Philip Mansfield, Tabitha Money, Kate Russell-Smith	
Bound	Rebecca A Fielding	Francesca Camozzi	John Bulleid, Luanna Priestman	Finalist - Panel Award for Writing
MEAT	Neil Bebber	Amy Simpson	David Maybrick, Sharon Young	Due to the indisposition of Sharon Young, the director replaced her for one performance.
Skyclad	Alex Everard	Tanith Lindon	Lauren Baxter, Edward Mitchell	
Percolate	Tom Stenton	Lavinia Hollands	Susan McGoun, David Meyer	
Two Rings	Louise Taylor	Michael Wilding	Natalie Bromley, Ellie Dickens, Barry Wilson	Bloggers' Choice Finalist
Wet Dog	Ösp Viggósdóttir	Martin Hackett	Joanna Greaves, Karl Niklas, Victoria Waddington	

==== Group Three ====
Play	Writer	Director	Cast	Notes
The Final Days of Fringe Theatre	Ian Townsend	Sharon Willems	Mary Benn, Freddie Machin, Kate A Walsh	Bloggers' Choice
Memories of Loss	Hannah Williams Walton	Ali Anderson-Dyer	Joseph Adelakun, Elisha Myton, Rachael Seaton, Tessa Wood	
Not to Be	Jake Leonard	Sian Thomas	Laura Glover	
Alternative Therapy	Beatrice Armstrong	Dawn Kalani-Cowle	Daniel Hallissey, Ewa Jenson (as Ewa Jaworski), Erica Thomas-Lowe	Finalist
The Dictator's Face	Afsaneh Gray	Tom McLaren	Tobias Deacon, Funmi Ogunleye, Chetan Pathak	
Spring	Georgina Burns	Gbemisola Ikumelo	Simon Nicholas, Jennifer Tan	
Looking for Vi	Mark Wright	Julia St. John	Joy Blakeman, Peter Clements, Maroussia Frank || Finalist - Panel Award for Ensemble Acting. Recently turned into a film featuring Josie Lawrence	

==== Group Four ====
Play	Writer	Director	Cast	Notes
Low Prices You Can Taste	Michael Ross	Abbie Lucas	Ffion Jolly, Chris Urch	
Click	Mike Carter	Justen Bennett	Sara Bahadori, Joe Browder, Stephanie Toghill, Ryan Witchert	Bloggers' Choice
Quid Pro Quo	Sandra Hale	Max Pappenheim	Peter Henderson, Jennifer Munby	
Skunk	Erasmus Murikami	William Glenn	Emily Holden, Viana Maya, Charlotte Slater	Following injury at dress rehearsal, this play was never performed
The Craft	Andrew Biss	Lydia Parker	Dan March, Tracey Anne Wood	Finalist
Basement Flat	Steven Rostance	Scott Le Crass	Richard Jackson, Lainey Shaw	
Let There Be	Tanja Mariodoss	Kate Bannister	Joanna Eliot, John Hoye, Hannah Wood	Finalist - Audience Award for Best Play

=== Off Cut 2012 ===
The festival remained at Riverside for 2012, moving into the much larger Studio Two. It ran from 25 September until 13 October. The panel was again headed by Moira Buffini, and included actor (and former Off Cut participant), Julia St. John and Matthew Poxon of The National Theatre Studio.

The number of plays writers were allowed to submit was reduced from four to two, and only UK-based playwrights were eligible or consideration. Nevertheless, 396 plays were received.

The Bloggers' Choice panel was made up of Ian Foster, Alison Child and Scott Matthewman.

This year, audience members were also able to vote online for their favourite actors (male and female), playwright and director.

==== Group One ====
Play	Writer	Director	Cast	Notes
IED	Rosalind Adler	Pauline Flannery	Daniel Hallissey, Elaine Harry, Polly Hughes	
Waiting for Doggo	Gary Dooley	Janet Palmer	Raphael Bar, Elvina Muschett	Bloggers' Choice
Sun-eyed Girl	Julie Mayhew	Gilli Foley	Jennie Barbrook	Finalist - Winner Audience Award for Favourite Female Actor
The Big Ask	Joseph Wilde	Claire Lindsay	David Hemsted, Adam Loxley	Finalist
Bus Station Blues	Zainab Hasan and Jessica Raphael	Geri Spicer	Amma Boateng, Kate Wyler	
Personnel	Hugo Plowden	Emma Burford	Matt Houlihan, Philip Nightingale, Michael Norledge, Linda Taimre	
In My Mind I'm Going to Carolina	Gina Hills	Amy Mulholland	Richard Jackson, Ewa Jensen (Ewa Jaworski), Kathy Trevelyan	

==== Group Two ====
Play	Writer	Director	Cast	Notes
Chaps	Rupert Laight	Bernie Byrnes	Tommie Grabiec, Ross McNamara, Demetri Turin	
Driven	Adam Udsen	Chris Carr	Andy Snowball	Winner Audience Award for Favourite Male Actor
Futures	William Patterson	Cat Robey	William McGeough, Stephen Sobal	Finalist
Buzz Kill	Annabel Wigoder	Sheryl Hill	Lauren Baxter, Antonia Reid	
A Muse of Fire	Wally Sewell	Hannah Banister	Freddie Hutchins, Elizabeth Menabney	
Boards	Charlie Platt	Rachel Illingworth	Rachael Hilton, Rachel Packford, Peter Rogan	Bloggers' Choice
Nice Sally	Joe Lidster	Jessica Radcliffe	Wendy Albiston, Stephen Kelly, Simon Kent, Asta Parry	Finalist - Winner Panel Award for Directing. Audience Award for Favourite Playwright

==== Group Three ====
Play	Writer	Director	Cast	Notes
Leaves on the Line	John Hastings	Ellen Carr	Chantelle Dusette, Barry Wilson	
Kicking and Screaming	Neil Irvine	Amanda Castro	Emma Fenney, Tom Graysham, Tom Whitelock	Bloggers' Choice
In a Box	Tom Collinson	Jonathon Carr	Jane Dodd, Stephen Fawkes, Amalia Vitale	Finalist - Winner Panel Awards for Playwriting and Ensemble Acting. Audience Award for Favourite Play
By the Weird Fountain	Thomas Willshire	Tom Bailey	Alice Bell, Ben de Halpert, Arwen Prosser, Peter Revel-Walsh	
A Mile and a Half on a Bus	Ian Skelton	Alison Trower	Sakina Ballard, Ellie Dickens	Finalist
Care	Bryher Armstrong	Elf Lyons	Maya Thomas	Winner Audience Award for Favourite Director
Armed Forces Day	Michael Ross	Ping Ng Choon	John Hoye, Darrie Gardner, Zara Radford, James Unsworth	

==== Group Four ====
Play	Writer	Director	Cast	Notes
Cheaper Seats Clap Your Hands	Will Howells	Stanley Walton	Tom Blyth, Richard Fish, Lainey Shaw	
Mud: The Urban Adventures of a Country Boy	Nick Myles	Manolis Emmanouel	Mark Parsons	Finalist
The Death of a Mime	Kieran Lynn	Anna Bates	Alexandra Agnew, Claude Girardi, Igor Medeiros, Francesca Reid	
White Meat, Dark Meat, Breast or Thigh?	Tolula Dada	Lauren Bracewell	Roger Carvahlo, Daniel Francis-Swaby, Karina Knapinska, Lelo Majozi	
The Stranger	Jeff Nolan	Ailin Conant	Leon Annor, Samuel Dent, Thom Mitchell	Finalist
NILF	Maya Sondhi	Sophie Moniram	Chandrika Chevli, Laura Hannah	Bloggers' Choice
Neil Diamond Saved My Life	Sylvia Dow	Jennifer Tang	Lisa Doran, Terry Jermyn	

=== Off Cut 2013 ===
Giving time for further development and restructuring of the festival, it was decided to scale down production for 2013. Therefore, a much smaller project was devised in conjunction with Theatre 503 in Battersea. Writers were asked to submit plays between 30 and 45 minutes in length, with a view to their working closely with actors and directors, as well as with 503 dramaturg, Graeme Thompson and Off Cut's Artistic Director, Daniel Brennan to develop their plays in rehearsal. Two plays were chosen to run in a double-bill at Theatre 503 from 12 to 17 August.

No prizes were awarded, either by an panel or the audience.

==== Off Cut Roots ====
Play	Writer	Director	Cast
Sophie in Wonderland	E. Moffett	Luisa Hinchliff	Samantha Béart, Elaine Harry
More Dead Girls	Troodie Mootz	Jessica Radcliffe	Tom Blyth, Alice Brown, Ewa Jensen, Charlotte Sutherland
