= Homicide: Division B =

- Directed by: Abner Pastoll
- Written by: Abner Pastoll
- Starring: Edward Peel; Tim Downie
- Distributed by: Shorts International
- Release date: 2008
- Country: United Kingdom

Homicide: Division B is a 2008 short film, written and directed by Abner Pastoll and starring Edward Peel and Tim Downie, about a group of defective detectives who attempt to foil a bomb plot.

The film was described by SKY TV as a "Delightfully daft cop comedy". It premiered at the Cannes Film Festival in the Short Film Corner and has been in competition at several high profile international film festivals including Newport Beach Film Festival, Tiburon Film Festival and the final Siena International Short Film Festival in Italy. It was selected by Jason Reitman as a finalist in the Project Direct! film competition.

The film is distributed by Shorts International, and has played on television in the USA, UK, France and other countries.
