= The Royal Bodyguard =

British TV comedy series

- Genre: Sitcom
- Written by: Mark Bussell; Justin Sbresni
- Directed by: Mark Bussell; Justin Sbresni
- Starring: David Jason; Geoffrey Whitehead; Timothy Bentinck; Tim Downie
- Country of origin: United Kingdom
- Original language: English
- No. of series: 1
- No. of episodes: 6

Production
- Running time: 30 minutes
- Production companies: Hat Trick Productions; Busby Productions

Original release
- Network: BBC One
- Release: 26 December 2011 – 30 January 2012

The Royal Bodyguard is a British television sitcom, written by Mark Bussell and Justin Sbresni, and starring David Jason, Geoffrey Whitehead, Timothy Bentinck and Tim Downie. A series of six episodes began on 26 December 2011, concluding on 30 January 2012. The first episode picked up more than 8 million viewers but the series soon declined in ratings. The series was heavily criticised by viewers and critics.

== Background ==
The series was written by Mark Bussell and Justin Sbresni following the success of their BBC sitcom The Worst Week of My Life. The pair came up with the idea of a Johnny English-type character who had to defend the royal family, but ended up doing so in a comic fashion. The pair immediately decided to make the programme family-oriented: at this stage, they did not envision Jason as the lead character. BBC comedy commissioner Cheryl Taylor lured Jason to the role, after initially offering him the job of executive producer. The series became the first for several years in which Jason had performed his own stunts. Filming on the series began in June 2011, and concluded in November. The first episode of the series was broadcast on 26 December 2011.

== Critical reception ==
Just hours after its broadcast, the first episode was heavily criticised by fans of Jason and viewers alike. Jim Shelley wrote "The Royal Bodyguard was, the BBC trumpeted, Sir David Jason's first Beeb comedy since Only Fools & Horses finished in 2002 – that was nine years ago. This fact alone should have alerted all involved to the fatal flaw at the heart of this debacle – namely that it was relying on the viewer's fondness for Del Boy. It was a classic example of blind faith in the production's star name. The prospect of seeing the 71-year-old star playing a former guardsman who had seen action in Northern Ireland and had now been appointed to the presumably prestigious position of royal bodyguard after saving the Queen's life stretched this fondness to breaking point. After about two minutes. Never mind that the plot's entire premise was stupid – that he was the incompetent former head of security at Buckingham Palace car park. The standard of the comedy was excruciating. It was blatantly designed to cash in on the appeal of characters like Inspector Clouseau and Johnny English. But the idea that Jason could play a clown as well as Peter Sellers or Rowan Atkinson was the only funny thing about it."

== Characters ==
- David Jason as Captain Guy Hubble – an ex-guardsman who has seen action in Cyprus and Northern Ireland, before becoming Head of Security at Buckingham Palace car park. He is appointed as Royal Bodyguard after saving the Queen's life in an apparent act of bravery on the day of the State Opening of Parliament.
- Geoffrey Whitehead as Colonel Dennis Whittington – Whittington is Hubble's boss. The Colonel (frequently shown wearing an Intelligence Corps tie) quickly realises that Hubble is a weak link in the security service, but is unable to fire him because Hubble somehow manages to keep pleasing the Queen and appease Sir Edward Hastings.
- Timothy Bentinck as Sir Edward Hastings – the top man in royal security. Colonel Whittington keeps approaching his boss with reports that Hubble is endangering royal security repeatedly and on a colossal scale, yet somehow Hubble comes out the other side of each disaster smelling of roses, meaning Sir Edward is unable to take any action.
- Tim Downie as Yates – young, efficient and dedicated Yates has been loyally serving in the Royal Household division for a number of years. He hoped to be promoted to the position of The Royal Bodyguard, but was pipped to the position by Hubble.

== Episodes ==
No.	Title	Directed by	Written by	Original release date	UK viewers (millions)
1	"The Limping Assassin"	Mark Bussell & Justin Sbresni	Mark Bussell & Justin Sbresni	26 December 2011	8.35
Hubble is appointed to oversee the Commonwealth conference in Scotland, but he is soon alerted to a planned attempt to assassinate the Queen. While attempting to find information as to who her killer might be, he finds himself in league with Katya, a charming woman whom Hubble believes to be nothing more than an excited hotel guest. His actions soon lead to him being thrown off the case, but after upsetting foreign ambassadors, colleagues, hotel guests and even the hotel pianist, Hubble believes he knows exactly who is set to kill the Queen. He sets out to stop them in his usual haphazard fashion.
2	"The Siege of Blenheim Square"	Mark Bussell & Justin Sbresni	Mark Bussell & Justin Sbresni	2 January 2012	5.23
Hubble is assigned by Whittington to accompany the Prince on a shopping trip to a jeweller's store. A mix-up between Hubble, a member of the Prince's protection team and a mysteriously-parked white van lead to the Prince becoming a hostage in a robbery. With the armed police stuck in traffic, Hubble takes it upon himself to rescue the Prince from a group of gunmen but his disguise as a pizza delivery man is soon uncovered by lead robber Jason (Adam Deacon), forcing him to devise an even more sneaky plan in order to save the Prince.
3	"Bullets Over Broad Street"	Mark Bussell & Justin Sbresni	Mark Bussell & Justin Sbresni	9 January 2012	3.54
Whittington sends Hubble on leave for seven days in order to avoid havoc at the Queen's Birthday celebrations. Hubble decides to visit a health spa, but upon his arrival he comes face-to-face with an old enemy, and soon finds himself being used as a bargaining tool between kidnappers and the government. His only hope of escape ends in disaster, but he is soon freed by an unsuspecting Yates, who gets a sprained neck for his trouble. Hubble is soon assigned to oversee the Queen's visit to Oxford: his old enemies are not far behind him and a shoot-out amongst priceless valuables ensues. His sniffer dog Winston comes to the rescue.
4	"The Royal Art of Blackmail"	Mark Bussell & Justin Sbresni	Mark Bussell & Justin Sbresni	16 January 2012	3.10
A burglar steals some paintings from the Queen's collection and Hubble is immediately enlisted to find the culprit. Unknowing to him, he has already assisted the thieves, whom he believed to be removal men. Hubble is ordered to keep watch, and immediately suspects Sir Ambrose (David Walliams) of being the culprit: Whittington disproves his theory. Hubble then creates a set-up situation in order to flush the burglars out, but ends up being kidnapped and soon discovers that his theory was right. A little incident with an ice cream truck threatens to end his career.
5	"The Perils of Attraction"	Mark Bussell & Justin Sbresni	Mark Bussell & Justin Sbresni	23 January 2012	3.26
The security service fakes Hubble's death, in order to place him inside Number 10 as an undercover operative to seek out a mole who is leaking state secrets to the North Koreans. Hubble – disguised as operations administrator Sandra Mellor – soon has two suspects. Unknown to him, a major player in foreign affairs at Number 10, who invites 'Sandra' for dinner, has more than a few secrets to tell. 'Sandra' also gets Whittington in trouble with his wife, after visiting his home and calling him at 3:00 am.
6	"A Watery Grave"	Mark Bussell & Justin Sbresni	Mark Bussell & Justin Sbresni	30 January 2012	3.33
Hubble is assigned to looking after the Princess during a hen party held by one of her best friends. He soon manages to lose sight of her, and comes under attack from a gaggle of hen-night party goers. Realising that the events of the evening are similar to those of an operation held in Northern Ireland in the 1980s, Hubble soon fears for his life after a mysterious attack with a stone gargoyle on his house. Ending up with his own personal bodyguard, Whittington has no choice but to believe Hubble's theory, but after detaining a suspect, strange things continue to happen.

== Home release ==
The Royal Bodyguard was released on DVD on 12 November 2012.
