= Clockwork Mice =

1995 film by Vadim Jean

- Directed by: Vadim Jean
- Screenplay by: Rod Woodruff
- Produced by: Paul Brooks
- Starring: Ian Hart; Catherine Russell; Rúaidhrí Conroy
- Cinematography: Gordon Hickie
- Edited by: Liz Webber
- Music by: David Hughes; John Murphy
- Production companies: Metrodome Films; Winchester Multimedia PLC
- Distributed by: Feature Film
- Release date: 23 June 1995
- Running time: 100 minutes
- Country: United Kingdom
- Language: English

Clockwork Mice is a 1995 British drama sports film directed by Vadim Jean and starring Ian Hart, Catherine Russell and Rúaidhrí Conroy. The film score was composed by David Hughes (formerly of OMD) and John Murphy.

== Plot ==
A teacher manages to bond with a special needs student.

== Cast ==
- Ian Hart as Steve
- Catherine Russell as Polly
- Rúaidhrí Conroy as Conrad (as Ruaidhri Conroy)
- Art Malik as Laney
- John Alderton as Swaney
- James Bolam as Wackey
- Claire Skinner as Fairy
- Nigel Planer as Parkey
- Lilly Edwards as Mrs. Charlton
- Robin Soans as Millwright
- Jack McKenzie as CID 1
- Melissa Simmonds as CID 2
- Carl Proctor as Country Policeman 1
- Billy Davey as Country Policeman 2
- Hormoz Verahramian as Businessman
- Glen Murphy as Mr. Charlton
- Toyosi Ajikawo as Tanya
- Lee Barrett as Clive Williams
- Leon Black as Burrows
- Frankie Bruno as Wellsy
- Bobby Coombes as Jeremy Marks
- Anthony Cumber as Didgery
- Ellam Lloyd Hull as David Charlton
- Darren Kennedy as Smithy
- Jodie Peters as Samantha
- Joanna Potts as Sharon
- Marcus Rose as Perryman
- Inderpall Sagoo as Sinbad
- Luke Strain as Austin

== Location ==
It was filmed at Great Stony School, Chipping Ongar, Essex. The school was later refurbished as an arts and residential centre, opened by Prince Edward, Earl of Wessex in November 2011.
