= Kindred: The Embraced =

American television series

- Genre: Supernatural drama Urban gothic
- Created by: John Leekley; Mark Rein-Hagen
- Starring: Mark Frankel; C. Thomas Howell; Stacy Haiduk; Channon Roe; Jeff Kober; Brigid Walsh; Kelly Rutherford; Patrick Bauchau; Erik King
- Country of origin: United States
- Original language: English
- No. of seasons: 1
- No. of episodes: 8 (1 unaired)

Production
- Producer: Mike Trozzo
- Running time: 45 minutes
- Production companies: John Leekley Productions; Spelling Television

Original release
- Network: Fox
- Release: April 2 – May 8, 1996

Kindred: The Embraced is an American television series produced by John Leekley Productions and Spelling Television. Loosely based on the role-playing game Vampire: The Masquerade, the series premiered on Fox on April 2, 1996, and ran for seven episodes before it was canceled with one episode unaired on May 9, 1996. Scripts for two other episodes were never filmed.

== Synopsis ==
The series initially focused on San Francisco Police Detective Frank Kohanek (C. Thomas Howell) who discovers his city is home to numerous vampires while investigating alleged mobster Julian Luna (Mark Frankel). Julian is not really a mobster, as Frank thinks; in fact, he is the Prince of the city, the ruler of five groups of vampires in the city, collectively called "the Kindred". Frank had been romantically involved with Julian's former lover, Alexandra. Before Alexandra dies as punishment for breaking the "Masquerade," she asks Julian to protect Frank as a special favor to her, which he does. The two form an odd sort of friendship as the series progresses. Julian provides Frank with insights and information regarding the vampire community as related to crimes he is investigating. Frank is able to act discreetly on Julian's behalf if needed. Further, Frank is shown to be somewhat resistant to a vampire's powers due to his past physical intimacy with a vampire.

Julian, in his role as Prince, is shown to be the only force that can stop the clans from breaking the uneasy truce that keeps them from fighting with each other. The vampires survive thanks to the "Masquerade", disguising themselves as humans, and Julian strictly enforces the laws that govern them to protect their anonymity. Any vampires who break those rules find their lives ended. Vampires are shown to slip into human society rather easily, holding a variety of jobs. The senior vampires who compose the conclave of San Francisco are depicted as wealthy heads of industry and business leaders.

Julian struggles with his romantic feelings for human reporter Caitlin Byrne (Kelly Rutherford). Further, Julian is assisted by and finds comfort in his trusted friend, Daedalus (Jeff Kober), who is the senior vampire for one of the five clans.

== Characters ==
=== Main ===
- Julian Luna (Mark Frankel), a vampire of Clan Ventrue, and prince of the city
- Caitlin Byrne (Kelly Rutherford), a human journalist
- Lillie Langtry (Stacy Haiduk), a vampire, and leader of Clan Toreador
- Detective Frank Kohanek (C. Thomas Howell), a human police detective
- Sasha Luna (Brigid Walsh), the last human relative of Julian Luna

=== Recurring ===
- Cash (Channon Roe), a vampire of the Gangrel clan who falls in love with Sasha
- Daedalus (Jeff Kober), a vampire of the Nosferatu clan
- Eddie Fiori (Brian Thompson), a vampire of the Brujah clan
- Archon Raine (Patrick Bauchau), a vampire of the Ventrue clan, and the former prince of the city

== Episodes ==
No.	Title	Directed by	Written by	Original release date	Prod. code
1	"Pilot"	Peter Medak	John Leekley	April 2, 1996	3795001
A police detective, Frank Kohanek, has learned that vampires exist, but doesn't realise that he's surrounded by them. The businessman whom he suspects is a mobster, Julian Luna, is the Prince of the San Francisco "Kindred" clans. Frank's girlfriend, Alexandra (Kate Vernon), is Julian's ex and also a vampire. When she reveals herself, breaking the Masquerade, her unlife is forfeit.
2	"Prince of the City"	Peter Medak	John Leekley	April 3, 1996	3795002
The feud with the Brujah is escalating. Against Masquerade policy, Eddie Fiori has ordered the death of Boyle, an informant of Detective Kohanek. However, the vote by the ruling clan leaders is split and Eddie is not sentenced to Final Death. Julian has fallen in love with reporter Caitlin Byrne, a human who wants to do an article on him because he is wealthy, powerful, and unseen. In order to control her, Julian buys the San Francisco Times and appoints her as the editor.
3	"Romeo and Juliet"	Ralph Hemecker	Joel Blasberg	April 10, 1996	3795004
Cash and Sasha have become lovers and Julian grudgingly gives permission for Cash to Embrace Sasha. He's too late, however, because the Brujah clan, trying to provoke a war between clans, has already Embraced her.
4	"Live Hard, Die Young, and Leave a Good Looking Corpse"	James L. Conway	Aaron Mendelson & Paul Tamasy	April 17, 1996	3795006
Zane (Ivan Sergei), a rock star Embraced by Lillie, endangers the Masquerade, but she's having trouble admitting that he's a problem. Sasha embraces her Brujah blood.
5	"The Rise and Fall of Eddie Fiori"	Kenneth Fink	Scott Smith Miller	April 24, 1996	3795005
Lillie is jealous of Caitlin and sends a P.I. to take photos of Julian and Caitlin together. The P.I. ends up capturing Eddie's assassination attempt on film. Frank ends up with a copy of the photos and shows them to Caitlin, so she breaks up with Julian. Lillie, meanwhile, has sided with Eddie, who is still planning to kill Julian. Heads will roll, but not the ones Eddie plans.
6	"Bad Moon Rising"	James L. Conway	Phyllis Murphy	May 1, 1996	3795007
With Brujah leader Eddie Fiori gone, fights are breaking out all over San Francisco to determine which Brujah will succeed him. This is to be expected. What isn't expected is the return of the Nosferatu Goth (Skipp Sudduth). Julian ran Goth out of town years ago, but he has returned, stronger than ever. And, when he performs the ritual and drinks the blood of the human infant he has just kidnapped, he will be unbeatable.
7	"Cabin in the Woods"	Ralph Hemecker	Curt Johnson	May 8, 1996	3795008
Julian hasn't been out of San Francisco in seven years. So when Caitlin asks him to go away with her for the weekend, Julian leaves Archon in charge and goes with her sans bodyguards to Manzanita Springs in Sonoma County where Caitlin has secured a secluded cabin in the woods. Unbeknown to Julian, the sole survivor of that bloodbath, a Brujah named Cameron (Titus Welliver), has reunited with the three remaining Manzanita Springs Brujah and has plans to take over Eddie's seat on the San Francisco conclave.
8	"Nightstalker"	John Harrison	P.K. Simonds & John Leekley	unaired	3795003
A recently Embraced and insane Kindred is making the news as a serial killer. Falling in love with human women is an issue for Julian, Cash and Daedalus.

== Release ==
=== Broadcast ===
The series premiered on Fox on April 2, 1996. New episodes aired weekly until May 9, 1996, after which the series was canceled and no additional episodes produced.

=== Home media ===
All eight episodes were released in a two volume DVD set on August 21, 2001. On August 5, 2013, it was announced that The Complete Series, packaged with the Book of Nod role-playing game supplement, would be released on October 22.

The 2013 release in addition to the Book of Nod supplement included:

- An extended version of the pilot episode.
- Deleted scenes for Nightstalker, Romeo and Juliet and Cabin in the Woods.
- Recaps.
- Audio commentary for Prince of the City, Romeo and Juliet, Bad Moon Rising and Cabin in the Woods.
- Vampire: The Masquerade – Origins of the Kindred, a documentary about the Tabletop game.
- Daedalus: Last Will and Testament, The Saga Continues... a video diary with Daedalus (reprised by Jeff Kober) to Abel, set after the events of the show.
- The Kindred Chronicles—Part One: Genesis and Part Two: Crafting a Myth, a documentary about the making of the show with interviews with some of the cast and crew.
- A letter called the "Kindred Requiem" which is a message from the show's creator included in the box set.

== Reception ==
Sci Fi Weekly's Kathie Huddleston called Kindred: The Embraced a "cross between The Godfather and Melrose Place" that held promise, but was very confusing to viewers with the five vampire clans and a particularly confusing pilot episode. While she felt the character of Frank appeared "to be pulled straight out of a bad cop film", she praised the character of Julian as a "multifaceted character who's both good and evil". Ken Tucker of Entertainment Weekly also compared the series to The Godfather "soaked in blood", calling it "knottily mystifying". Like Huddleston, he disliked the character of Frank, wishing he had been killed by a vampire early in the series, while praising "the elegant, intelligent prince" Julian.

Pyramid magazine reviewed Kindred: The Embraced and stated that "the show is so firmly based on the game it's almost scary. There are differences, of course – some of them significant – but a TV show has to be (not is usually, or is regarded as, but has to be) less complex than an RPG. It has nothing to do, really, with American TV being geared for morons (though I'm not saying it isn't), it's just a matter of simple logistics."

== See also ==
- Vampire film
- List of vampire television series
