= Opening Night =

Opening Night may refer to:

- Premiere, or opening night, the first public presentation of a play, film, dance, or musical composition

== Film ==
- The Opening Night, a 1927 American silent drama film
- Opening Night (1977 film), an American drama film, and a 2019 play adaptation
  - Opening Night (musical), a 2024 musical adaptation
- Opening Night, a 2014 horror film featuring Tuesday Knight
- Opening Night (2016 film), an American musical comedy

== Television ==
=== Series ===
- Opening Night, a 1958 American TV series of reruns of episodes of Ford Theatre
- Opening Night (TV series), a 1974–1975 Canadian TV series

=== Episodes ===
- "Opening Night" (Curb Your Enthusiasm)
- "Opening Night" (Glee)
- "Opening Night" (Parenthood)
- "Opening Night" (Schitt's Creek)
- "Opening Night" (Smash)

== Music ==
- Opening Night (album), by the Thad Jones/Mel Lewis Orchestra, 2000
- "Opening Night" (song), 2026 song by Arctic Monkeys
- "Opening Night", a song by The Weeknd from Hurry Up Tomorrow, 2025

== Other media ==
- Opening Night (novel), by Ngaio Marsh, 1951
- Opening Night (video game), 1995
