= Cling to Me Like Ivy =

2010 play by Samantha Ellis

Cling to Me Like Ivy is a 2010 play by playwright Samantha Ellis staged at the Birmingham Repertory Theatre on 11 February 2010 directed by Sarah Esdaile. It was inspired by a chance remark by Victoria Beckham which sparked a crisis in the Orthodox Jewish community over the wigs worn by married women. The cast was: Gethin Anthony, Amanda Boxer, Mona Goodwin, David Hartley, Edward Halsted and Emily Holt. It was published by Nick Hern Books. The Guardian called it "funny, sad and compassionate...that genuinely rare beast, a popular comedy with heart, brains and the stomach to make some difficult choices".
