= Jeany Spark =

English actress (born 7 November 1982)

- Born: 1982/1983 (age 43–44)
- Education: Lady Margaret Hall, Oxford; Royal Academy of Dramatic Art
- Occupation: Actor
- Years active: 2008–present

Jeannette "Jeany" Spark (born 7 November 1982) is an English actress, known for portraying Linda Wallander in the British television series Wallander. She has also appeared in the comedy series Man Down and the drama series The Interceptor.

== Education ==
Spark studied English literature at Lady Margaret Hall, Oxford, graduating with a First-Class Honours degree in 2004. She then trained as an actress at the Royal Academy of Dramatic Art, graduating in 2007.

== Career ==
In 2008, Spark played schoolteacher Mercy Chant in the BBC adaptation of Thomas Hardy's Tess of the D’Urbervilles. Spark also took on the role of Linda Wallander, the daughter of the titular character in the BBC One drama Wallander.

In 2011, Spark portrayed Joan Malin in the BBC Four television film Hattie. In 2013, she took the role of the deputy headmistress, Emma, in Man Down, the Channel 4 comedy series. The show lasted for four series.

Spark plays the role of Detective Inspector Kate Gemmill in the 2015 BBC One drama The Interceptor. In 2016, Spark joined the cast of the ITV drama Jericho.

In 2017, Spark took the lead role in the Theatr Clwyd's production of Skylight, a play by David Hare. In 2019, she appeared for the Royal Shakespeare Company in Crooked Dances, a new play by Robin French, as the character Katy Porlock.

In 2018, she appeared as Captain Sandrine Shaw in the BBC Two miniseries Collateral. In 2019, Spark appeared as Kate in the episode "I Am Hannah", of the Channel 4 anthology series I Am....

== Filmography ==
Key
†	Denotes films that have not yet been released

=== Film ===
Year	Title	Role	Notes
2011	Showreel	Grace	
2012	Red Lights	Traci Northrop	
2012	Worm	Susie	Short film
2012	Ideal Wife	Nathalie Burns	Short film
2013	The Fifth Estate	Wired Reporter	
2016	As One	Abi	Short film
2017	Sump	Sally	Short film
2024	Portraits of Dangerous Women	Steph	
2025	By the Throat	Amy	
TBA	The Last Disturbance of Madeline Hynde †	TBA	Post-production

=== Television ===
Year	Title	Role	Notes
2008	Lewis	Jane Evans	Episode: "And the Moonbeams Kiss the Sea"
2008	Tess of the D'Urbervilles	Mercy Chant	Miniseries, 3 episodes
2008–2015	Wallander	Linda Wallander	Main cast
2010	Sherlock	Homeless Girl	Episode: "The Great Game"
2010	Mystery!	Linda Wallander	Episode: "Wallander, Series II: Faceless Killers"
2011	Hattie	Joan Malin	Television film
2011	Shirley	Juhni Sullivan	Television film
2011	Law & Order: UK	Julia Anstiss	Episode: "Trial"
2011	Death in Paradise	Emilie Saunders	Episode: "Spot the Difference"
2011	Black Mirror	Camilla	Episode: "The National Anthem"
2012	A Touch of Cloth	Gemma	Episodes: "The First Class: Parts One & Two"
2013	Vera	Agnes Lennox	Episode: "Prodigal Son"
2013	The Escape Artist	Tara	Miniseries, 3 episodes
2013–2017	Man Down	Emma	Main cast
2014	Line of Duty	Claire Tindall	Episodes: "The Ambush", "Carly"
2014	Da Vinci's Demons	Ippolita Maria Sforza	Main cast (season 2)
2015	The Interceptor	Gemmill	Miniseries, main cast
2016	Jericho	Isabella Lambton	Main cast
2016, 2017	Holby City	Lauren Wilson	Episodes: "Parasite", "The Hangover"
2017	Born to Kill	Lauren	Miniseries, 2 episodes
2018	Collateral	Sandrine Shaw	Miniseries, main cast
2019	I Am...	Kate	Episode: "I Am Hannah"
2022	Van der Valk	Anouk Prinsens	Episode: "Payback in Amsterdam"
2022	The Crown	Birt's Assistant	Episode: "Gunpowder"
2023	Hapless	Naomi Isaacs	Main cast (series 2)
2024	Professor T.	Tina Morley	Episode: "The Conference"
2024	The Lord of the Rings: The Rings of Power	Commander of the South	Episodes: "Where the Stars are Strange", "Halls of Stone"
2024	Moonflower Murders	Samantha Collins	Miniseries; 3 episodes
2026	Patience	Marina Murray	Episode: "Vampire"
TBA	Inheritance †	Rachel	Miniseries; post-production
