= Robin Galloway (actress) =

American actress, writer and producer

Robin Galloway is an American actress, writer and producer.

== Early life and education ==
Robin spent the early years of her life in over a dozen locations around the world; throughout the domestic U.S., the Hawaiian Islands, Germany, South Korea and Japan. After graduating from high school in Japan, she returned to the United States and went on to receive her B.A. in Political Science/International Relations from The University of Connecticut. She later went on to earn an M.F.A. in Acting from Brown University,

== Career ==
Theatre Credits Include; The Misanthrope (New York Theatre Workshop, Dir. Ivo Van Hove); The Rose Tattoo (Broadway Benefit, Dir. Doug Hughes, starring Patti LuPone); The Master Builder (wksp. Dir. Andre Gregory); Shining City (Wellfleet Harbor Actors Theatre); Much Ado About Nothing (Portland Stage Company); The Glass Menagerie, A Christmas Carol, Suddenly Last Summer (Trinity Repertory Company); The Winged Man (H.E.R.E. Arts Center); Special Election (Dixon Place); The Next War (Columbia MFAs/Schapiro Theatre); 27 Wagons Full of Cotton (Actors Center); Richard III, and Curse of the Starving Class (Brown/Trinity)

TV/Film Credits Include; "Law & Order", "Saving Grace", Mousy Brown and Losing Control.
