= Gordon Hickie =

Scottish cinematographer

James Hall Gordon Hickie (born 14 September 1948) is a Scottish cinematographer.

== Filmography ==
- 2007 – Holby City
- 2010 – Waterloo Road (Episodes 5.14, 5.17 and 5.18)
- 2006 – The Inspector Lynley Mysteries
- 2002 – Silent Witness
- 2004 – Hustle
- 2004 – Red Cap
- 2002 – Being April
- 2002 – Helen West
- 2000 – The Ghost of Greville Lodge
- 2000 – Attachments
- 2000 – Between Two Women
- 1999 – Cafe D'Paris (short)
- 1998 – Space Island One
- 1998 – The Big Swap
- 1998 – Driven
- 1997 – Red Mercury
- 1995 – Clockwork Mice
- 1994 – A Night with a Woman, a Day with Charlie (TV Short)
- 1992 – Leon the Pig Farmer
