= Vadim Jean =

British film director

Vadim Jean (born Bristol, 9 December 1963) is an English film director, producer, and executive producer.

== Career ==
After graduating with a degree in history from Warwick University, he found work on Mike Figgis' Stormy Monday, before establishing his own production company in 1989 covering a wide variety of subjects, from sport to corporate videos. He first came to public attention as a director when Leon the Pig Farmer won him the FIPRESCI International Critics' Prize at the 1992 Venice Film Festival, the Best Newcomer award from the London Critics' Circle, the Most Promising Newcomer at the Evening Standard British Film Awards, and the Chaplin Award for the best first feature from the Edinburgh International Film Festival.

He repeated his critical success in 1999 when One More Kiss won the Audience Award at the Atlantic Film Festival, and was nominated for Best Film at the International Filmfest Emden. His Hollywood debut was Jiminy Glick in Lalawood starring Martin Short as his celebrity interviewing alter-ego, produced by Gold Circle films. The film also features Steve Martin and Kurt Russell as themselves. It was selected as the closing gala at the 2004 Toronto International Film Festival. In 2010 he directed In the Land of the Free... a feature documentary narrated by Samuel L. Jackson. It tells the story of three men known as the Angola Three who among them have spent over a century in solitary confinement in the Louisiana State penitentiary. It was nominated best documentary at the 2011 Evening Standard British Film Awards.. He subsequently continued to film the evolving story for another five years until the release of Albert Woodfox in 2016 when a new updated version of the film, Cruel & Unusual was transmitted on Channel 4 in 2017.

In TV Vadim is best known as the writer and director of the multi BAFTA and RTS award winning Terry Pratchett Discworld adaptations for Sky, including The Colour of Magic (Sean Astin, Tim Curry and Jeremy Irons) and Hogfather (Sir David Jason, Michelle Dockery and Ian Richardson) which remains the highest rating show on Sky1 of all time.

Vadim’s second series of the TV comedy Porters starring Rutger Hauer, Daniel Mays and Sanjeev Bhaskar was broadcast in 2019 on Dave. This followed the success of Henry IX written by British comedy legends Dick Clement & Ian La Frenais starring Sally Phillips, Annette Crosbie and Colin Salmon for UKTV which won the Rose D’Or for best sitcom 2018.

In 2022 Vadim was show runner for and directed Final Scene, 8 half hours for MBC studios and Shahid (the biggest streamer in the Middle East) in Arabic.

He is also a producer of the 2018 feature film, The Man Who Invented Christmas, the story of Charles Dickens writing ‘A Christmas Carol’ starring Dan Stevens, Christopher Plummer and Jonathan Pryce.

In 2024 Vadim directed Daley - Olympic Superstar, the definitive feature documentary about Double Olympic champion in the decathlon, Daley Thompson. It was transmitted on BBC2 to positive reviews and over 2 M viewers. It won best film at the Broadcast Sports Business awards.

His latest feature film Dance of the Macaroni Flowers, starring Ruby Stokes, Sally Phillips and Mille Anna-Prelogar completed principal photography in August 2026 and is due for theatrical release in the UK in 2027.

== Personal Life ==
He was a finalist representing the University of Warwick in the 2011 University Challenge Christmas Special on BBC2.

In 2024 he achieved a life time’s ambition by being selected to play for England in the hockey Masters World Cup in New Zealand, winning a bronze medal.

== Filmography ==
Year	Film	Role	Ref.
1992	Leon the Pig Farmer	Director, producer	
1994	Beyond Bedlam	Producer, writer	
1995	Clockwork Mice	Director	
1998	The Real Howard Spitz	Director	
1999	Just Desserts (TV)	Director	
1999	One More Kiss	Producer, director	
2003	The Virgin of Liverpool	Producer	
2004	Working the Thames (TV)	Director	
2004	Jiminy Glick in Lalawood	Director	
2006	Scenes of a Sexual Nature	Executive producer	
2006	Internal	Executive producer	
2006	Terry Pratchett's Hogfather (TV)	Director, writer	
2007	Oliviero Rising	Writer	
2008	Terry Pratchett's The Colour of Magic (TV)	Director, writer	
2009	Off the Hook (TV)	Director	
2010	In the Land of the Free...	Producer, director	
2010	Terry Pratchett's Going Postal	Executive producer	
2014	Breaking the Bank	Director	
2016	The Rebel (TV)	Producer, director	
2017	Henry IX (TV)	Director	
2017	Cruel and Unusual (Documentary)	Producer, director	
2017	The Man Who Invented Christmas	Producer	
2017	Porters (TV)	Director	
2017	The Rebel (2) (TV)	Director	
2019	Porters (2) (TV)	Director	
2017	Porters (TV)	Director	
2021	Zebra Girl	Executive Producer	
2022	Final Scene (TV)	Showrunner, director	
2023	White Widow	Executive Producer	
2024	Daley - Olympic Superstar	Director, producer, writer	
2027	Dance of the Macaroni Flowers	Director, producer	
