= List of humanoid aliens =

This list of humanoid aliens is a collection of various notable extraterrestrial humanoid characters that appear in various works of fiction. Humanoid aliens have traits similar to that of human beings including upright stance, bipedalism, opposable thumbs, facial features, etc.

== Animation ==
Character	Origin	Notes
The Great Gazoo	The Flintstones	A tiny extraterrestrial who was exiled from his home planet Zetox to Earth. He was found by Fred Flintstone and Barney Rubble and is required to do good deeds for them, although only they can see him, along with children and animals.
Hime Shirayuki/Cure Princess	HappinessCharge PreCure!	A princess from the Blue Sky Kingdom.
Mikitaka Hazekura	JoJo's Bizarre Adventure	Mikitaka appears as a teenage boy of average to above-average height and slim to average build. He has pointed ears and long, straight light hair flowing back over his head. He is introduced wearing a nose chain, which is missing in later chapters.
Interplanet Janet	Schoolhouse Rock	A fashionable cyborg girl from another galaxy. She has bubblegum pink hair and wears a unique dress with a pink bodice and a "rocket-booster" skirt.
Jet Propulsion	Ready Jet Go!	An alien from Bortron 7. He and his parents live on Earth to study its habitats, and he has befriended the human children.
Lala Hagoromo/Cure Milky	Star Twinkle PreCure	An extraterrestrial alien from the planet Samaan.
Little Twelvetoes	Schoolhouse Rock!	A jovial alien with green or turquoise skin, six fingers and toes, a nose similar to Pinocchio, and blond hair.
Marvin	Merrie Melodies/Looney Tunes	A Martian, but is often found elsewhere. He is often accompanied by his dog "K-9", and sometimes by other creatures.
Ozmodiar	The Simpsons	A tiny extraterrestrial alien only Homer Simpson can see. He is a parody of The Great Gazoo.
Roger	American Dad!	An alien who lives in Stan Smith's attic.
Sailor Starlights	Sailor Moon	A trio of Sailor Guardians from Planet Kinmoku, ruled by Princess Kakyuu. They are supporting characters in the last arc of the manga, but are given a protagonistic role in the fifth season of the anime series.
Shadow Galactica	Sailor Moon	The main antagonists of the final arc of the manga and anime series. They come from different planets across the Milky Way, and have their base of operations in the Galactic Center.
Son Goku	Dragon Ball	The protagonist of the Dragon Ball series. A Saiyan from the planet Vegeta intended to cause havoc on Earth, but loses his memories upon arriving. He is unaware of his true origins until he becomes an adult and meets his brother, Raditz.
Yuni/Cure Cosmo	Star Twinkle PreCure	An shapeshifting catgirl from the planet Rainbow.
Zim	Invader Zim	An Irken from Irk whose mission is to conquer Earth and enslave the human race.
Viltrumites	Invincible	From an alien planet whose mission is to conquer and enslave planets.

== Comics ==
Character	Origin	Creator	Notes
Annihilus	Marvel Comics	Stan Lee and Jack Kirby	An insectoid conqueror from the Negative Zone. In 2009, Annihilus was ranked as IGN's 94th Greatest Comic Book Villain of All Time.
Cosmo	Cosmo the Merry Martian	Bob White	A Martian who visits Earth.
Darna	Darna	Mars Ravelo and Nestor Redondo	A deceased extraterrestrial warrior who manifests itself in a human girl from Earth named Narda.
Khâny	Yoko Tsuno	Roger Leloup	An extraterrestrial from the planet Vinea. Apart from her blue skin she looks just like a human being.
Plunk	Plunk	Luc Cromheecke and Laurent Letzer	An extraterrestrial alien from the planet Smurk who wears green trousers and a hat in the same colour.
The Scrameustache	Scrameustache	Roland Goossens, aka Gos.	An extraterrestrial character whose face resembles that of a cat.
Mr. Skygack	Mr. Skygack, from Mars	A.D. Condo	A Martian who came to Earth to study mankind's behavior, but nevertheless gets a lot of observations wrong.
Clark Kent / Superman	DC Comics	Jerry Siegel, Joe Shuster	An extraterrestrial from the planet Krypton who has superhuman powers.
Xal-Kor	Xal-Kor the Human Cat	Grass Green	An extraterrestrial from the planet Felis who can change forms from a common house cat to a hybrid man-cat form and then a fully human form.
Zook	DC Comics	Jack Miller, Joe Certa	A creature from another dimension who becomes the crimefighting partner of Martian Manhunter.

== Film ==
Character(s)	Origin	Notes
E.T.	E.T. the Extra-Terrestrial	An alien from outer space who is accidentally left behind by his crew and befriends a human boy during his stay on Earth.
Various	Marvel Cinematic Universe	The Marvel Cinematic Universe features numerous humanoid extraterrestrial characters, including Asgardians, numerous members of the Guardians of the Galaxy, the Eternals, and more.
Klaatu	The Day the Earth Stood Still	An alien who comes to Earth to give the planet a peaceful message: Klaatu barada nikto.
Various	Star Wars	The Star Wars franchise contains various humanoid aliens, including Chewbacca, Yoda, Darth Maul, and Ahsoka Tano.
Zaphod Beeblebrox	The Hitchhiker's Guide to the Galaxy	He is from a planet in the vicinity of Betelgeuse, and is a "semi-half-cousin" of Ford Prefect, with whom he "shares three of the same mothers".
Mork	Mork & Mindy	An alien from the planet Ork who befriends a woman named Mindy on earth after being sent by his own kind to study humanity.
The Alien Girl	Super Deluxe	One of the lead characters, Gaaji, falls for The Alien Girl, played by Mirnalini Ravi. She is unaware of her origins but lives on the Earth with other aliens, mingling with humans.
Eon	Ben 10: Race Against Time	An alien who came to Earth to free his species from their dimensional entrapment and allow them to invade Earth.

== Literature ==
Character	Book	Author	Notes
The Little Prince	The Little Prince	Antoine de Saint-Exupéry	A little prince who fell from an asteroid to Earth.
Curtis	One Door Away from Heaven	Dean Koontz	A young shapeshifting alien on the run from bounty-hunters.
Ras Thavas	The Master Mind of Mars	Edgar Rice Burroughs	A Martian mad scientist.
The Thing	Who Goes There?	John W. Campbell	A shapeshifting alien that takes a human form.

== Television ==
Character	Origin	Notes
Adric	Doctor Who	A young native of the planet Alzarius, which exists in the parallel universe of E-Space. A companion of the Fourth and Fifth Doctors.
ALF (real name: Gordon Shumway)	ALF	An alien from the planet Melmac who crash lands on Earth and is adopted by the Tanner family.
Beldar, Prymaat and Connie	The Coneheads sketches on Saturday Night Live.	An extraterrestrial family from the planet Remulak who all have bald conical heads. The father is named Beldar, the mother Prymaat and their daughter Connie. They live on Earth and try not to fit in with human society.
Big Giant Head	3rd Rock from the Sun	An alien leader who controls the Solomons. When he eventually came to Earth he also took on a human guise, like them.
The Doctor	Doctor Who	A Gallifreyan adventurer and scientist with a strong moral sense. He usually solves problems with his wits rather than with force.
Fofão	Balão Mágico and TV Fofão	An extraterrestrial child character who was popular on Brazilian television in the 1980s.
Gonzo	The Muppet Show	An anteater-like puppet who was eventually revealed to be of extraterrestrial origin in the film Muppets from Space (1999).
Lulin	Planet Lulin	A 12-year-old girl who is half-alien from the planet Astorad and half-human, who has emerging alien powers, with her human friends Henri and Spider, while keeping her new alien powers dealt with.
Mork	Mork & Mindy	An extraterrestrial from the planet Ork who develops a friendship with Mindy McConnell, a human woman.
Martin O'Hara	My Favorite Martian	A Martian anthropologist stranded on Earth and who is adopted by the O' Hara family.
Solomon family (Dick Solomon, Harry Solomon, Sally Solomon, Tommy Solomon)	3rd Rock from the Sun	A family of aliens who assume human guises while on a secret mission on Earth.
Spock	Star Trek	A scientist and Starfleet officer from the planet Vulcan who, apart from his pointed ears, looks like a human. He is an officer on the crew of the starship Enterprise.
Thermoman	My Hero	An alien from the planet Ultron. The Ultronians have great superpowers and most of them act as superheroes protecting inferior beings throughout the galaxy, such as humans.
Ultraman	Ultraman	A race of aliens that devote themselves to protecting the universe. They often take on human forms or merge with humans to blend in with society. Ultramen usually appear to fight giant monsters and other aliens.

== Video games ==
Character	Origin	Notes
Abe	Oddworld	Abe is the strongly developed central character of the Oddworld series. He can also use GameSpeak, a way of communicating with other characters in the game.
Artanis	StarCraft	Artanis is the primary Protoss protagonist and player character in the StarCraft II trilogy. He is introduced in Brood War as a high templar and a military commander.
Captain Olimar	Pikmin	Olimar is the main character of the Pikmin series. He is a very small alien originating from the fictional planet Hocotate.
Forerunner	Halo	Tall ancient Humanoid Aliens that created the Halo rings.

== See also ==
- List of Star Trek aliens
