= The Culture =

Fictional universe created by Iain M. Banks

The Culture is a fictional interstellar post-scarcity society created by the Scottish writer Iain M. Banks and features in a number of his space opera novels and works of short fiction, collectively called the Culture series.

The Culture is composed primarily of humanoid aliens, artificial intelligences (A.I.), and a number of other sentient life forms. The A.I. intelligence covers a spectrum; simple programs performing a specific function (e.g. controlling spacesuits), human-equivalent drones and hyper-intelligent Minds who organise and oversee the society. Beyond scarcity, the Culture has no need for money; instead, Minds organise society to maximise the well-being of its citizenry. The protagonists, almost always humanoids, are generally those who have chosen to work for the Culture's diplomatic or espionage organs and interact with other civilisations whose citizens act under different ideologies, morals, and technologies.

The Culture generally has more advanced technology relative to most other civilisations it shares the galaxy with. Most of the Culture's citizens do not live on planets but in artificial habitats such as orbitals and ships, the largest of which are home to billions of individuals. The Culture's citizens have been genetically enhanced to live for as long as they desire and have modified mental control over their physiology, including the ability to introduce a variety of psychoactive drugs into their systems, change biological sex, or switch off pain at will. The Culture's technology is able to transfer individuals into vastly different body forms, although the Culture's standard form remains fairly humanoid.

The Culture holds peace and individual freedom as its core values. A central theme of the series is the ethical struggle it faces when interacting with other societies – some of which brutalise their own members, pose threats to other civilisations, or threaten the Culture itself. It tends to make major decisions based on the consensus formed by its citizens: in one instance, the entire population – a direct democratic vote of trillions – decided that the Culture would go to war with a rival civilisation. Those who objected to the subsequent militarisation broke off from the Culture, forming their own separate civilisation. Another hallmark of the Culture is its ambiguity; in contrast to the other interstellar societies and empires, it is more difficult to define both geographically and sociologically, and it "fades out at the edges".

== Overview ==
The Culture is a post-scarcity, egalitarian society which has overcome most of the physical constraints of life and created a stable society without the use of unnecessary force or compulsion. That being said, some citizens, including the extremely powerful artificial intelligences, Minds, sometimes engage in the manipulation of others. This includes influencing or controlling the development of alien societies through the group known as Contact.

The novels of the Culture cycle mostly deal with people at the fringes of the Culture: diplomats, spies, or mercenaries; those who interact with other civilisations, and who do the Culture's dirty work in moving those societies closer to the Culture ideal, sometimes by force.

== Fictional history ==
In this fictional universe, the Culture exists concurrently with human society on Earth. The time frame for the published Culture stories is from 1267 CE to roughly 2970 CE, with Earth being contacted around 2100 CE, though the Culture had covertly visited the planet in the 1970s in The State of the Art.

The Culture itself is described as having been created when several humanoid species and machine sentiences reached a certain social level, and took not only their physical, but also their civilisational evolution into their own hands. In The Player of Games, the Culture is described as having existed as a space-faring society for eleven thousand years. In The Hydrogen Sonata, one of these founding civilisations was named as the Buhdren Federality.

== Society and culture ==
=== Economy ===
The Culture is a symbiotic society of artificial intelligences (AIs) (Minds and drones), humanoids and other alien species who all share equal status. All essential work is performed (as far as possible) by non-sentient devices, freeing sentients to do only things that they enjoy (administrative work requiring sentience is undertaken by the AIs using a bare fraction of their mental power, or by people who take on the work out of free choice). As such, the Culture is a post-scarcity society, where technological advances ensure that no one lacks any material goods or services. Energy is farmed from a fictitious "energy grid", and matter to build orbitals is collected mostly from asteroids. As a consequence, the Culture has no need of economic constructs such as money (as is apparent when it deals with civilisations in which money is still important). The Culture rejects all forms of economics based on anything other than voluntary activity. "Money implies poverty" is a common saying in the Culture.

=== Language ===
Marain is the Culture's shared constructed language. The Culture believes the Sapir–Whorf hypothesis that language influences thought, and Marain was designed by early Minds to exploit this effect, while also "appealing to poets, pedants, engineers and programmers". Designed to be represented either in binary or symbol-written form, Marain is also regarded as an aesthetically pleasing language by the Culture. The symbols of the Marain alphabet can be displayed in three-by-three grids of binary (yes/no, black/white) dots and thus correspond to nine-bit binary numbers.

Related comments are made by the narrator in The Player of Games regarding gender-specific pronouns, which Marain speakers do not use in typical conversation unless specifying one's gender is necessary, and by general reflection on the fact that Marain places much less structural emphasis on (or even lacks) concepts like possession and ownership, dominance and submission, and especially aggression. Many of these concepts would in fact be somewhat theoretical to the average Culture citizen. Indeed, the presence of these concepts in other civilisation signify the brutality and hierarchy associated with forms of empire that the Culture strives to avoid.

Marain itself is also open to encryption and dialect-specific implementations for different parts of the Culture. M1 is basic Nonary Marain, the three-by-three grid. All Culture citizens can communicate in this variant. Other variants include M8 through M16, which are encrypted by various degrees, and are typically used by the Contact Section. Higher level encryptions exist, the highest of these being M32. M32 and lower level encrypted signals are the province of Special Circumstances (SC). Use of M32 is reserved for extremely secret and reserved information and communication within Special Circumstances. That said, M32 has an air of notoriety in the Culture, and in the thoughts of most may best be articulated as "the Unbreakable, Inviolable, Holy of Holies Special Circumstances M32" as described by prospective SC agent Ulver Seich. Ships and Minds also have a slightly distasteful view of SC procedure associated with M32, one Ship Mind going so far as to object to the standard SC attitude of "Full scale, stark raving M32 don't-talk-about-this-or-we'll-pull-your-plugs-out-baby paranoia" on the use of the encryption.

=== Laws ===
There are no laws as such in the Culture. Social norms are enforced by convention (personal reputation, "good manners", and by, as described in The Player of Games, possible ostracism and involuntary supervision for more serious crimes). Minds generally refrain from using their all-seeing capabilities to influence people's reputations, though they are not necessarily themselves above judging people based on such observations, as described in Excession. Minds also judge each other, with one of the more relevant criteria being the quality of their treatment of sentients in their care. Hub Minds for example are generally nominated from well-regarded GSV (the largest class of ships) Minds, and then upgraded to care for the billions living on the artificial habitats.

Serious prohibitions exist against harming sentient beings, or forcing them into undertaking any act (another concept that seems unnatural to and is, in fact, almost unheard of by almost all Culture citizens). As mentioned in The Player of Games, the Culture does have the occasional "crime of passion" (as described by an Azadian) and the punishment was to be "slap-droned", or to have a drone assigned to follow the offender and "make sure [they] don't do it again".

While the enforcement in theory could lead to a Big Brother-style surveillance society, in practice social convention among the Minds prohibits them from watching, or interfering in, citizens' lives unless requested, or unless they perceive severe risk. The practice of reading a sentient's mind without permission (something the Culture is technologically easily capable of) is strictly taboo. The whole plot of Look to Windward relies on a Hub Mind not reading an agent's mind (with certain precautions in case this rule gets violated). Minds that do so anyway are considered deviant and shunned by other Minds (see GCU Grey Area). At one point it is said that if the Culture actually had written laws, the sanctity of one's own thoughts against the intrusion of others would be the first on the books.

This gives some measure of privacy and protection; though the very nature of Culture society would, strictly speaking, make keeping secrets irrelevant: most of them would be considered neither shameful nor criminal. It does allow the Minds in particular to scheme amongst themselves in a very efficient manner, and occasionally withhold information.

=== Symbols ===
The Culture has no flag, symbol or logo. According to Consider Phlebas, people can recognise items made by the Culture implicitly, by the way they are simple, efficient and aesthetic. The main outright symbol of the Culture is its language, Marain, which is used far beyond the Culture itself. It is often employed in the galaxy as a de facto lingua franca among people who don't share a language. Marain has a similar purpose to other constructed languages encountered in utopian and dystopian fiction including Pravic in The Dispossessed and Newspeak in Nineteen Eighty-Four.

== Citizens ==
=== Biological ===
The Culture is a posthuman society, which originally arose when seven or eight roughly humanoid space-faring species coalesced into a quasi-collective (a group-civilisation) ultimately consisting of approximately thirty trillion (short scale) sentient and sapient beings (this includes artificial intelligences). In Banks's universe, a good part (but by no means an overwhelming percentage) of all sentient species is of the "pan-human" type, as noted in Matter.

Although the Culture was originated by humanoid species, subsequent interactions with other civilisations have introduced many non-humanoid species into the Culture (including some former enemy civilisations), though the majority of the biological Culture is still pan-human. Little uniformity exists in the Culture, and its citizens are such by choice, free to change physical form and even species (though some stranger biological conversions are irreversible, and conversion from biological to artificial sentience is considered to be what is known as an Unusual Life Choice). All members are also free to join, leave, and rejoin, or indeed declare themselves to be, say, 80% Culture.

Within the novels, opponents of the Culture have argued that the role of humans in the Culture is nothing more than that of pets, or parasites on Culture Minds, and that they can have nothing genuinely useful to contribute to a society where science is close to omniscient about the physical universe, where every ailment has been cured, and where every thought can be read. Many of the Culture novels in fact contain characters (from within or without the Culture) wondering how far-reaching the Minds' dominance of the Culture is, and how much of the democratic process within it might in fact be a sham: subtly but very powerfully influenced by the Minds in much the same ways Contact and Special Circumstances influence other societies.

Refuting this perspective is a constant theme within the series. "Referrers" (humans of especially acute reasoning) are involved in high-level Culture decisions. Humanoid agents are given wide latitude to solve problems without AI oversight and support. Humanoids frequently directly contradict their AI colleagues in the process of 'saving the day'.

The Culture can be seen as fundamentally hedonistic (one of the main objectives for any being, including Minds, is to have fun rather than to be "useful"). Minds are constructed, by convention, to care for and value human beings. While a General Contact Unit (GCU) does not strictly need a crew (and could construct artificial avatars when it did), a real human crew adds richness to its existence, and offers distraction during otherwise dull periods. In Consider Phlebas it is noted that Minds still find humans fascinating, especially their odd ability to sometimes achieve similarly advanced reasoning as their much more complex machine brains.

To a large degree, the freedoms enjoyed by humans in the Culture are only available because Minds choose to provide them. The freedoms include the ability to leave the Culture when desired, often forming new associated but separate societies with Culture ships and Minds, most notably the Zetetic Elench and the ultra-pacifist and non-interventionist Peace Faction.

==== Physiology ====
Techniques in genetics have advanced in the Culture to the point where bodies can be freed from built-in limitations. Citizens of the Culture refer to a normal human as "human-basic" and the vast majority opt for significant enhancements: severed limbs grow back, sexual physiology can be voluntarily changed from male to female and back (though the process takes time), sexual stimulation and endurance are strongly heightened in both sexes (something that is often the subject of envious debate among other species), pain can be switched off, toxins can be bypassed away from the digestive system, autonomic functions such as heart rate can be switched to conscious control, reflexes like blinking can be switched off, and bones and muscles adapt quickly to changes in gravity without the need to exercise. The degree of enhancement found in Culture individuals varies to taste, with certain of the more exotic enhancements limited to Special Circumstances personnel (for example, weapons systems embedded in various parts of the body).

Most Culture individuals opt to have drug glands that allow for hormonal levels and other chemical secretions to be consciously monitored, released and controlled. These allow owners to secrete on command any of a wide selection of synthetic drugs, from the merely relaxing to the mind-altering: "Snap" is described in Use of Weapons and The Player of Games as "The Culture's favourite breakfast drug". "Sharp Blue" is described as a utility drug, as opposed to a sensory enhancer or a sexual stimulant, that helps in problem solving. "Quicken", mentioned in Excession, speeds up the user's neural processes so that time seems to slow down, allowing them to think and have mental conversation (for example with artificial intelligences) in far less time than it appears to take to the outside observer. "Sperk", as described in Matter, is a mood- and energy-enhancing drug, while other such self-produced drugs include "Calm", "Gain", "Charge", "Recall", "Diffuse", "Somnabsolute", "Softnow", "Focal", "Edge", "Drill", "Gung", "Winnow" and "Crystal Fugue State". The glanded substances have no permanent side-effects and are non-habit-forming.

==== Phenotypes ====
For all their genetic improvements, the Culture is by no means eugenically uniform. Human members in the Culture setting vary in size, colour and shape as in reality, and with possibly even further natural differences: in the novella The State of the Art, it is mentioned that a character "looks like a Yeti", and that there is variance among the Culture in minor details such as the number of toes or of joints on each finger. It is mentioned in Excession that

the tenor of the time had generally turned against... outlandishness and people had mostly returned to looking more like people over the last millennium... (previously) as the fashions of the intervening times had ordained – people... had resembled birds, fish, dirigible balloons, snakes, small clouds of cohesive smoke and animated bushes.

Some Culture citizens opt to leave the constraints of a human or even humanoid body altogether, opting to take on the appearance of one of the myriad other galactic sentients (perhaps in order to live with them) or even non-sentient objects as commented upon in Matter (though this process can be irreversible if the desired form is too removed from the structure of the human brain). Certain eccentrics have chosen to become drones or even Minds themselves, though this is considered rude and possibly even insulting by most humans and AIs alike.

While the Culture is generally pan-humanoid (and tends to call itself "human"), various other species and individuals of other species have become part of the Culture.

Culture citizens are described to be in perfect genetic health; the rare cases of a visible physical deformity are generally treated as deliberate fashion choices.

==== Personality ====
Almost all Culture citizens are very sociable and of great intellectual capability and learning, and possess very well‑balanced psyches. Their biological make-up and their growing up in an enlightened society make neuroses and lesser emotions like greed or (strong) jealousy practically unknown, and produce persons that, in any lesser society, appear very self-composed and charismatic. Character traits like strong shyness, while very rare, are not fully unknown, as shown in Excession. As described there and in Player of Games, a Culture citizen who becomes dysfunctional enough to pose a serious nuisance or threat to others would be offered (voluntary) psychological adjustment therapy and might potentially find themself under constant (non-voluntary) oversight by representatives of the local Mind. In extreme cases, as described in Use of Weapons and Surface Detail, dangerous individuals have been known to be assigned a "slap-drone", a robotic follower who ensures that the person in question doesn't continue to endanger the safety of others.

=== Artificial ===
As well as humans and other biological species, sentient artificial intelligences are also members of the Culture. These can be broadly categorised into drones and Minds. Also, by custom, as described in Excession, any artifact (be it a tool or vessel) above a certain capability level has to be given sentience.

==== Drones ====
Drones are roughly comparable in intelligence and social status to that of the Culture's biological members. Their intelligence is measured against that of an average biological member of the Culture; a so-called "1.0 value" drone would be considered the mental equal of a biological citizen, whereas lesser drones such as the menial service units of Orbitals are merely proto-sentient (capable of limited reaction to unprogrammed events, but possessing no consciousness, and thus not considered citizens; these take care of much of the menial work in the Culture). The sentience of advanced drones has various levels of redundancy, from systems similar to that of Minds (though much reduced in capability) down to electronic, to mechanical and finally biochemical back-up brains.

Although drones are artificial, the parameters that prescribe their minds are not rigidly constrained, and sentient drones are full individuals, with their own personalities, opinions and quirks. Like biological citizens, Culture drones generally have lengthy names. They also have a form of sexual intercourse for pleasure, called being "in thrall", though this is an intellect-only interfacing with another sympathetic drone.

While civilian drones do generally match humans in intelligence, drones built especially as Contact or Special Circumstances agents are often several times more intelligent, and imbued with extremely powerful senses, powers and armaments (usually forcefield and effector-based, though occasionally more destructive weaponry such as lasers or, exceptionally, "knife-missiles" are referred to) all powered by antimatter reactors. Despite being purpose-built, these drones are still allowed individual personalities and given a choice in lifestyle. Indeed, some are eventually deemed psychologically unsuitable as agents (for example as Mawhrin-Skel notes about itself in The Player of Games) and must choose either mental reprofiling or demilitarisation and discharge from Special Circumstances.

Physically, drones are floating units of various sizes and shapes, usually with no visible moving parts. Drones get around the limitations of this inanimation with the ability to project "fields": both those capable of physical force, which allow them to manipulate objects, as well as visible, coloured fields called "auras", which are used to enable the drone to express emotion. There is a complex drone code based on aura colours and patterns (which is fully understood by biological Culture citizens as well). Drones have full control of their auras and can display emotions they're not feeling or can switch their aura off. The drone Jase, in Consider Phlebas, is said to have been constructed before the use of auras, and refuses to be retrofitted with them, preferring to remain inscrutable.

In size drones vary substantially: the oldest still alive (eight or nine thousand years old) tend to be around the size of humans, whereas later technology allows drones to be small enough to lie in a human's cupped palm; modern drones may be any size between these extremes according to fashion and personal preference. Some drones are also designed as utility equipment with its own sentience, such as the gelfield protective suit described in Excession.

==== Minds ====
By contrast to drones, Minds are orders of magnitude more powerful and intelligent than the Culture's other biological and artificial citizens. Typically they inhabit and act as the controllers of large-scale Culture hardware such as ships or space-based habitats. Unsurprisingly, given their duties, Minds are tremendously powerful: capable of running all of the functions of a ship or habitat, while holding potentially billions of simultaneous conversations with the citizens that live aboard them. To allow them to perform at such a high degree, they exist partially in hyperspace to get around hindrances to computing power such as the speed of light.

Some inhabited planets and all orbitals have their own Minds: sapient, hyperintelligent machines originally built by biological species, which have evolved, redesigned themselves, and become many times more intelligent than their original creators. According to Consider Phlebas, a Mind is an ellipsoid object roughly the size of a bus and weighing around 15,000 tons. A Mind is in fact a 4-D entity, meaning that the ellipsoid is only the protrusion of the larger four dimensional device into our 3D 'real space'.

In the Culture universe, Minds have become a very important part of the prevailing society, enabling much of its post-scarcity amenities by planning and automating societal functions, and by handling day-to-day administration with fractions of their mental power.

The main difference between Minds and other extremely powerful artificial intelligences in fiction is that they are highly humanistic and benevolent. They are so both by design, and by their shared culture. They are often even rather eccentric. Yet, by and large, they show no wish to supplant or dominate their erstwhile creators.

On the other hand, it can also be argued that to the Minds, the human-like members of the Culture amount to little more than pets, whose wants are followed on a Mind's whim. Within the Series, this dynamic is played on more than once. In 'Excession', it is also played on to put a Mind in its place – in the mythology, a Mind is not thought to be a god, still, but an artificial intelligence capable of surprise, and even fear.

Overview

Although the Culture is a type of utopian anarchy, Minds most closely approach the status of leaders, and would likely be considered godlike in less rational societies. As independent, thinking beings, each has its own character, and indeed, legally (insofar as the Culture has a 'legal system'), each is a Culture citizen. Some Minds are more aggressive, some more calm; some don't mind mischief, others simply demonstrate intellectual curiosity. But above all they tend to behave rationally and benevolently in their decisions.

As mentioned before, Minds can serve several different purposes, but Culture ships and habitats have one special attribute: the Mind and the ship or habitat are perceived as one entity; in some ways the Mind is the ship, certainly from its passengers' point of view. It seems normal practice to address the ship's Mind as "Ship" (and an Orbital hub as "Hub"). However, a Mind can transfer its 'mind state' into and out of its ship 'body', and even switch roles entirely, becoming (for example) an Orbital Hub from a warship.

More often than not, the Mind's character defines the ship's purpose. Minds do not end up in roles unsuited to them; an antisocial Mind simply would not volunteer to organise the care of thousands of humans, for example. On occasion groupings of two or three Minds may run a ship. This seems normal practice for larger vehicles such as GSVs, though smaller ships only ever seem to have one Mind.

Banks also hints at a Mind's personality becoming defined at least partially before its creation or 'birth'. Warships, as an example, are designed to revel in controlled destruction; seeing a certain glory in achieving a 'worthwhile' death also seems characteristic. The presence of human crews on board warships may discourage such recklessness, since in the normal course of things, a Mind would not risk beings other than itself.

With their almost godlike powers of reasoning and action comes a temptation to bend (or break) Cultural norms of ethical behaviour, if deemed necessary for some greater good. In The Player of Games, a Culture citizen is blackmailed, apparently by Special Circumstances Minds, into assisting the overthrow of a barbaric empire, while in Excession, a conspiracy by some Minds to start a war against an oppressive alien race nearly comes to fruition. Yet even in these rare cases, the essentially benevolent intentions of Minds towards other Culture citizens is never in question. More than any other beings in the Culture, Minds are the ones faced with the more complex and provocative ethical dilemmas.

Technology

While Minds would likely have different capabilities, especially seeing their widely differing ages (and thus technological sophistication), this is not a theme of the books. It might be speculated that the older Minds are upgraded to keep in step with the advances in technology, thus making this point moot. It is also noted in Matter that every Culture Mind writes its own OS, thus continually improving itself and, as a side benefit, becoming much less vulnerable to outside takeover by electronic means and viruses, as every Mind's processing functions work differently.

The high computing power of the Mind is apparently enabled by thought processes (and electronics) being constantly in hyperspace (thus circumventing the light speed limit in computation). Minds do have back-up capabilities functioning with light-speed if the hyperspace capabilities fail – however, this reduces their computational powers by several orders of magnitude (though they remain sentient).

The storage capability of a GSV Mind is described in Consider Phlebas as 10^{30} bytes (1 million yottabytes).

The Culture is a society undergoing slow (by present-day Earth standards) but constant technological change, so the stated capacity of Minds is open to change. In the last 3,000 years, the capacity of Minds has increased considerably. By the time of the events of the novel Excession in the mid 19th century, Minds from the first millennium BCE are referred to jocularly as minds, with a small 'm'. Their capacities only allow them to be considered equivalent to what are now known as AI Cores, small (in the literal physical sense) Artificial intelligences used in shuttles, trans-light modules, Drones, and other machines not large enough for a full scale Mind. While still considered sentient, a mind's power at this point is considered greatly inferior to a contemporary Mind. That said, It is possible for Minds to have upgrades, improvements and enhancements given to them since construction, to allow them to remain up to date.

Using the sensory equipment available to the Culture, Minds can see inside solid objects; in principle they can also read minds by examining the cellular processes inside a living brain, but Culture Minds regard such mindreading as taboo. The only known Mind to break this Taboo, the GCU Grey Area seen in Excession, is largely ostracised and shunned by other Minds as a result. In Look to Windward an example is cited of an attempt to destroy a Culture Mind by smuggling a minuscule antimatter bomb onto a Culture orbital inside the head of a Chelgrian agent. However the bomb ends up being spotted without the taboo being broken.

In Consider Phlebas, a typical Mind is described as a mirror-like ellipsoid of several dozen cubic metres, but weighing many thousands of tons, due to the fact that it is made up of hyper-dense matter. It is noted that most of its 'body' only exists in the real world at the outer shell, the inner workings staying constantly within hyperspace.

The Mind in Consider Phlebas is also described as having internal power sources which function as back-up shield generators and space propulsion, and seeing the rational, safety-conscious thinking of Minds, it would be reasonable to assume that all Minds have such features, as well as a complement of drones and other remote sensors as also described.

Other equipment available to them spans the whole range of the Culture's technological capabilities and its practically limitless resources. However, this equipment would more correctly be considered emplaced in the ship or orbital that the Mind is controlling, rather than being part of the Mind itself.

Psychology

Minds are constructed entities, which have general parameters fixed by their constructors (other Minds) before 'birth', not unlike biological beings. A wide variety of characteristics can be and are manipulated, such as introversion-extroversion, aggressiveness (for warships) or general disposition.

However, the character of a Mind evolves as well, and Minds often change over the course of centuries, sometimes changing personality entirely. This is often followed by them becoming eccentric or at least somewhat odd. Others drift from the Culture-accepted ethical norms, and may even start influencing their own society in subtle ways, selfishly furthering their own views of how the Culture should act.

Minds have also been known to commit suicide to escape punishment, or because of grief.

Minds are constructed with a personality typical of the Culture's interests, i.e. full of curiosity, general benevolence (expressed in the 'good works' actions of the Culture, or in the protectiveness regarding sentient beings) and respect for the Culture's customs.

Nonetheless, Minds have their own interests in addition to what their peers expect them to do for the Culture, and may develop fascinations or hobbies like other sentient beings do.

The mental capabilities of Minds are described in Excession to be vast enough to run entire universe-simulations inside their own imaginations, exploring metamathical (a fictional branch of metamathematics) scenarios, an activity addictive enough to cause some Minds to totally withdraw from caring about our own physical reality into "Infinite Fun Space", their own, ironic and understated term for this sort of activity.

Ship Minds

One of the main activities of Ship Minds is the guidance of spaceships from a certain minimum size upwards. A culture spaceship is the Mind and vice versa; there are no different names for the two, and a spaceship without a Mind would be considered damaged or incomplete to the Culture.

Ship Mind classes include General Systems Vehicle (GSV), Medium Systems Vehicle (MSV), Limited Systems Vehicle (LSV), General Contact Vehicle (GCV), General Contact Unit (GCU), Limited Contact Unit (LCU), Rapid Offensive Unit (ROU), General Offensive Unit (GOU), Limited Offensive Unit (LOU), Demilitarised ROU (dROU), Demilitarised GOU (dGOU), Demilitarised LOU (dLOU), Very Fast Picket (VFP–synonym for dROU), Fast Picket (FP–synonym for dGOU or dLOU), and Superlifter.

These ships provide a convenient 'body' for a Mind, which is too large and too important to be contained within smaller, more fragile shells. Following the 'body' analogy, it also provides the Mind with the capability of physical movement. As Minds are living beings with curiosity, emotion and wishes of their own, such mobility is likely very important to most.

Culture Minds (mostly also being ships) usually give themselves whimsical names, though these often hint at their function as well. Even the names of warships retain this humorous approach, though the implications are much darker.

Non-Ship Minds

Some Minds also take on functions which either preclude or discourage movement. These usually administer various types of Culture facilities:

- Orbital Hubs – A Culture Orbital is a smaller version of a ringworld, with large numbers of people living on the inside surface of them, in a planet-like environment.
- Rocks – Minds in charge of planetoid-like structures, built/accreted, mostly from the earliest times of the Culture before it moved into space-built orbitals.
- Stores – Minds of a quiet temperament run these asteroids, containing vast hangars, full of mothballed military ships or other equipment. Some 'Rocks' also act as 'Stores'.
- University Sages – Minds that run Culture universities / schools, a very important function as every Culture citizen has an extensive education and further learning is considered one of the most important reasons for life in the Culture.

Atypical Minds

- Eccentric – Culture Minds who have become "... a bit odd" (as compared to the very rational standards of other Culture Minds). Existing at the fringe of the Culture, they can be considered (and consider themselves) as somewhat, but not wholly part of the Culture.
- Sabbaticaler – Culture Minds who have decided to abdicate from their peer pressure-based duties in the Culture for a time.
- Ulterior – Minds of the Culture Ulterior, an umbrella term for all the no-longer-quite-Culture factions.
- Converts – Minds (or sentient computers) from other societies who have chosen to join the Culture.
- Absconder – Minds who have completely left the Culture, especially when in doing so having deserted some form of task.
- Deranged – A more extreme version of Eccentric as implied in The Hydrogen Sonata

Minds' names

Minds (and, as a consequence, Culture starships) usually bear names that do a little more than just identify them. The Minds themselves choose their own names, and thus they usually express something about a particular Mind's attitude, character or aims in their personal life. They range from funny to just plain cryptic. Some examples are:

- Sanctioned Parts List – a habitation / factory ship
- So Much For Subtlety – a habitation / factory ship
- All Through With This Niceness And Negotiation Stuff – a warship
- Attitude Adjuster – a warship
- Of Course I Still Love You – an ambassador ship
- Funny, It Worked Last Time... – an ambassador ship

=== Names ===
Some humanoid or drone Culture citizens have long names, often with seven or more words. Some of these words specify the citizen's origin (place of birth or manufacture), some an occupation, and some may denote specific philosophical or political alignments (chosen later in life by the citizen themselves), or make other similarly personal statements. An example would be Diziet Sma, whose full name is Rasd-Coduresa Diziet Embless Sma da' Marenhide:

- Rasd-Coduresa is the planetary system of her birth, and the specific object (planet, orbital, Dyson sphere, etc.). The -sa suffix is roughly equivalent to -er in English. By this convention, Earth humans would all be named Sun-Earthsa (or Sun-Earther).
- Diziet is her given name. This is chosen by a parent, usually the mother.
- Embless is her chosen name. Most Culture citizens choose this when they reach adulthood (according to The Player of Games this is known as "completing one's name"). Like all conventions in the Culture, it may be broken or ignored: some change their chosen name during their lives, some never take one.
- Sma is her surname, usually taken from one's mother.
- da' Marenhide is the house or estate she was raised within, the da' or dam being similar to von in German. (The usual formation is dam; da' is used in Sma's name because the house name begins with an M, eliding an awkward phoneme repetition.)

Iain M. Banks gave his own Culture name as "Sun-Earther Iain El-Bonko Banks of North Queensferry".

=== Death ===
The Culture has a relatively relaxed attitude towards death. Genetic manipulation and the continual benevolent surveillance of the Minds make natural or accidental death almost unknown. Advanced technology allows citizens to make backup copies of their personalities, allowing them to be resurrected in case of death. The form of that resurrection can be specified by the citizen, with personalities returning either in the same biological form, in an artificial form (see below), or even just within virtual reality. Some citizens choose to go into "storage" (a form of suspended animation) for long periods of time, out of boredom or curiosity about the future.

Attitudes individual citizens have towards death are varied (and have varied throughout the Culture's history). While many, if not most, citizens make some use of backup technology, many others do not, preferring instead to risk death without the possibility of recovery (for example when engaging in extreme sports). These citizens are sometimes called "disposables", and are described in Look to Windward. Taking into account such accidents, voluntary euthanasia for emotional reasons, or choices like sublimation (abandoning physical reality), the average lifespan of humans is said in Excession to be around 350 to 400 years. Some citizens choose to forgo death altogether, although this is rarely done and is viewed as an eccentricity. Other options instead of death include conversion of an individual's consciousness into an AI, joining of a group mind (which can include biological and non-biological consciousnesses), or subliming (usually in association with a group mind).

Concerning the lifespan of drones and Minds, given the durability of Culture technology and the options of mindstate backups, it is reasonable to assume that they live as long as they choose. Even Minds, with their utmost complexity, are known to be backed up (and reactivated if they for example die in a risky mission, see GSV Lasting Damage). It is noted that even Minds themselves do not necessarily live forever either, often choosing to eventually sublime or even killing themselves (as does the double-Mind GSV Lasting Damage due to its choices in the Culture-Idiran war).

== Science and technology ==
=== Anti-gravity and forcefields ===
The Culture (and other societies) have developed powerful anti-gravity abilities, closely related to their ability to manipulate forces themselves.

In this ability they can create action-at-a-distance – including forces capable of pushing, pulling, cutting, and even fine manipulation, and forcefields for protection, visual display or plain destructive ability. Such applications still retain restrictions on range and power: while forcefields of many cubic kilometres are possible (and in fact, orbitals are held together by forcefields), even in the chronologically later novels, such as Look to Windward, spaceships are still used for long-distance travel and drones for many remote activities.

With the control of a Mind, fields can be manipulated over vast distances. In Use of Weapons, a Culture warship uses its electromagnetic effectors to hack into a computer light years away.

=== Artificial intelligence ===
Artificial intelligences (and to a lesser degree, the non-sentient computers omnipresent in all material goods), form the backbone of the technological advances of the Culture. Not only are they the most advanced scientists and designers the Culture has, their lesser functions also oversee the vast (but usually hidden) production and maintenance capabilities of the society.

The Culture has achieved artificial intelligences where each Mind has thought processing capabilities many orders of magnitude beyond that of human beings, and data storage drives which, if written out on paper and stored in filing cabinets, would cover thousands of planets skyscraper high (as described by one Mind in Consider Phlebas). Yet it has managed to condense these entities to a volume of several dozen cubic metres (though much of the contents and the operating structure are continually in hyperspace). Minds also demonstrate reaction times and multitasking abilities orders of magnitude greater than any sentient being; armed engagements between Culture and equivalent technological civilisations sometimes occur in timeframes as short as microseconds, and standard Orbital Minds are capable of running all of the vital systems on the Orbital while simultaneously conversing with millions of the inhabitants and observing phenomena in the surrounding regions of space.

At the same time, it has achieved drone sentiences and capability of Special Circumstance proportions in forms that could fit easily within a human hand, and built extremely powerful (though not sentient) computers capable of fitting into tiny insect-like drones. Some utilitarian devices (such as spacesuits) are also provided with artificial sentience. These specific types of drones, like all other Culture AI, would also be considered citizens – though as described in the short story "Descendant", they may spend most of the time when their "body" is not in use in a form of remote-linked existence outside of it, or in a form of AI-level virtual reality.

=== Energy manipulation ===
A major feature of its post-scarcity society, the Culture is obviously able to gather, manipulate, transfer and store vast amounts of energy. While not explained in detail in the novels, this involves antimatter and the "energy grid", a postulated energy field dividing the universe from neighboring anti-matter universes, and providing practically limitless energy. Transmission or storage of such energy is not explained, though these capabilities must be powerful as well, with tiny drones capable of very powerful manipulatory fields and forces.

The Culture also uses various forms of energy manipulation as weapons, with "gridfire", a method of creating a dimensional rift to the energy grid, releasing astronomical amounts of energy into a region of non-hyperspace, being described as a sort of ultimate weapon more destructive than collapsed antimatter bombardment. One character in Consider Phlebas refers to gridfire as "the weaponry of the end of the universe". Gridfire resembles the zero-point energy used within many popular science fiction stories.

=== Matter displacement ===
The Culture (at least by the time of The Player of Games) has developed a form of teleportation capable of transporting both living and unliving matter instantaneously via wormholes. This technology has not rendered spacecraft obsolete – in Excession a barely apple-sized drone was displaced no further than a light-second at maximum range (mass being a limiting factor determining range), a tiny distance in galactic terms. The process also still has a very small chance of failing and killing living beings, but the chance is described as so small (1 in 61 million) that it normally only becomes an issue when transporting a large number of people and is only regularly brought up due to the Culture's safety conscious nature.

Displacement is an integral part of Culture technology, being widely used for a range of applications from peaceful to belligerent. Displacing warheads into or around targets is one of the main forms of attack in space warfare in the Culture universe. The Player of Games mentions that drones can be displaced to catch a person falling from a cliff before they impact the ground, as well.

=== Brain–computer interfaces ===
Through "neural lace", a form of brain–computer interface that is implanted into the brains of young people and grows with them, the Culture has the capability to read and store the full sentience of any being, biological or artificial, and thus reactivate a stored being after its death. The neural lace also allows wireless communication with the Minds and databases. This also necessitates the capability to read thoughts, but as described in Look to Windward, doing this without permission is considered taboo.

=== Starships and warp drives ===
Starships are living spaces, vehicles and ambassadors of the Culture. A proper Culture starship (as defined by hyperspace capability and the presence of a Mind to inhabit it) may range from several hundreds of metres to hundreds of kilometres. The latter may be inhabited by billions of beings and are artificial worlds in their own right, including whole ecosystems, and are considered to be self-contained representations of all aspects of Culture life and capability.

The Culture (and most other space-faring species in its universe) use a form of Hyperspace-drive to achieve faster-than-light speeds. Banks has evolved a (self-confessedly) technobabble system of theoretical physics to describe the ships' acceleration and travel, using such concepts as "infraspace" and "ultraspace" and an "energy grid" between universes (from which the warp engines "push off" to achieve momentum). An "induced singularity" is used to access infra or ultra space from real space; once there, "engine fields" reach down to the Grid and gain power and traction from it as they travel at high speeds.

These hyperspace engines do not use reaction mass and hence do not need to be mounted on the surface of the ship. They are described as very dense exotic matter, which only reveals its complexity under a powerful microscope. Acceleration and maximum speed depend on the ratio of the mass of the ship to its engine mass. As with any other matter aboard, ships can gradually manufacture extra engine volume or break it down as needed. In Excession one of the largest ships of the Culture redesigns itself to be mostly engine (by combining the hyperspace engine fields of thousands of semi-slaved warships which have been constructed in secret, and housed within the ship itself, and out of view) and reaches a speed of 233,000 times lightspeed. Within the range of the Culture's influence in the galaxy, most ships would still take years of travelling to reach the more remote spots.

Other than the engines used by larger Culture ships, there are a number of other propulsion methods such as gravitic drive at sublight speeds, with antimatter, fusion and other reaction engines occasionally seen with less advanced civilisations, or on Culture hobby craft.

Warp engines can be very small; some Culture drones barely larger than fist-size have them. There is also at least one (apparently non-sentient) species (the "Chuy-Hirtsi" animal), that possesses the innate capability of warp travel. In Consider Phlebas, it is being used as a military transport by the Idirans, but no further details are given.

=== Nanotechnology ===
The Culture has highly advanced nanotechnology, though descriptions of such technology in the books is limited. Many of the described uses are by or for Special Circumstances, but there are no indications that the use of nanotechnology is limited in any way. (In a passage in one of the books, there is a brief reference to the question of sentience when comparing the human brain or a "pico-level substrate".)

One of the primary clandestine uses of nanotechnology is information gathering. The Culture likes to be in the know, and as described in Matter "they tend to know everything." Aside from its vast network of sympathetic allies and wandering Culture citizens one of the primary ways that the Culture keeps track of important events is by the use of practically invisible nanobots capable of recording and transmitting their observations. This technique is described as especially useful to track potentially dangerous people (such as ex-Special Circumstances agents). Via such nanotechnology, it is potentially possible for the Culture (or similarly advanced societies) to see everything happening on a given planet, orbital or any other habitat. The usage of such devices is limited by various treaties and agreements among the Involved.

In addition, EDust assassins are potent Culture terror weapons, composed entirely of nano machines called EDust, or "Everything Dust." They are capable of taking almost any shape or form, including swarms of insects or entire humans or aliens, and possess powerful weaponry capable of levelling entire buildings.

== Living space ==
Much of the Culture's population lives on orbitals, vast artificial worlds that can accommodate billions of people. Others travel the galaxy in huge space ships such as General Systems Vehicles (GSVs) that can accommodate hundreds of millions of people. Almost no Culture citizens are described as living on planets, except when visiting other civilisations. The reason for this is partly because the Culture believes in containing its own expansion to self-constructed habitats, instead of colonising or conquering new planets. With the resources of the universe allowing permanent expansion (at least assuming non-exponential growth), this frees them from having to compete for living space.

The Culture, and other civilisations in Banks' universe, are described as living in these various, often constructed habitats:

=== Airspheres ===
These are vast, brown dwarf-sized bubbles of atmosphere enclosed by force fields, and (presumably) set up by an ancient advanced race at least one and a half billion years ago (see: Look to Windward). There is only minimal gravity within an airsphere. They are illuminated by moon-sized orbiting planetoids that emit enormous light beams.

Citizens of the Culture live there only very occasionally as guests, usually to study the complex ecosystem of the airspheres and the dominant life-forms: the "dirigible behemothaurs" and "gigalithine lenticular entities", which may be described as inscrutable, ancient intelligences looking similar to a cross between gigantic blimps and whales. The airspheres slowly migrate around the galaxy, taking anywhere from 50 to 100 million years to complete one circuit. In the novels no one knows who created the airspheres or why, but it is presumed that whoever did has long since sublimed but may maintain some obscure link with the behemothaurs and lenticular entities. Guests in the airspheres are not allowed to use any force-field technology, though no reason has been offered for this prohibition.

The airspheres resemble in some respects the orbit-sized ring of breathable atmosphere created by Larry Niven in The Integral Trees, but spherical not toroidal, require a force field to retain their integrity, and arose by artificial rather than natural processes.

=== Orbitals ===
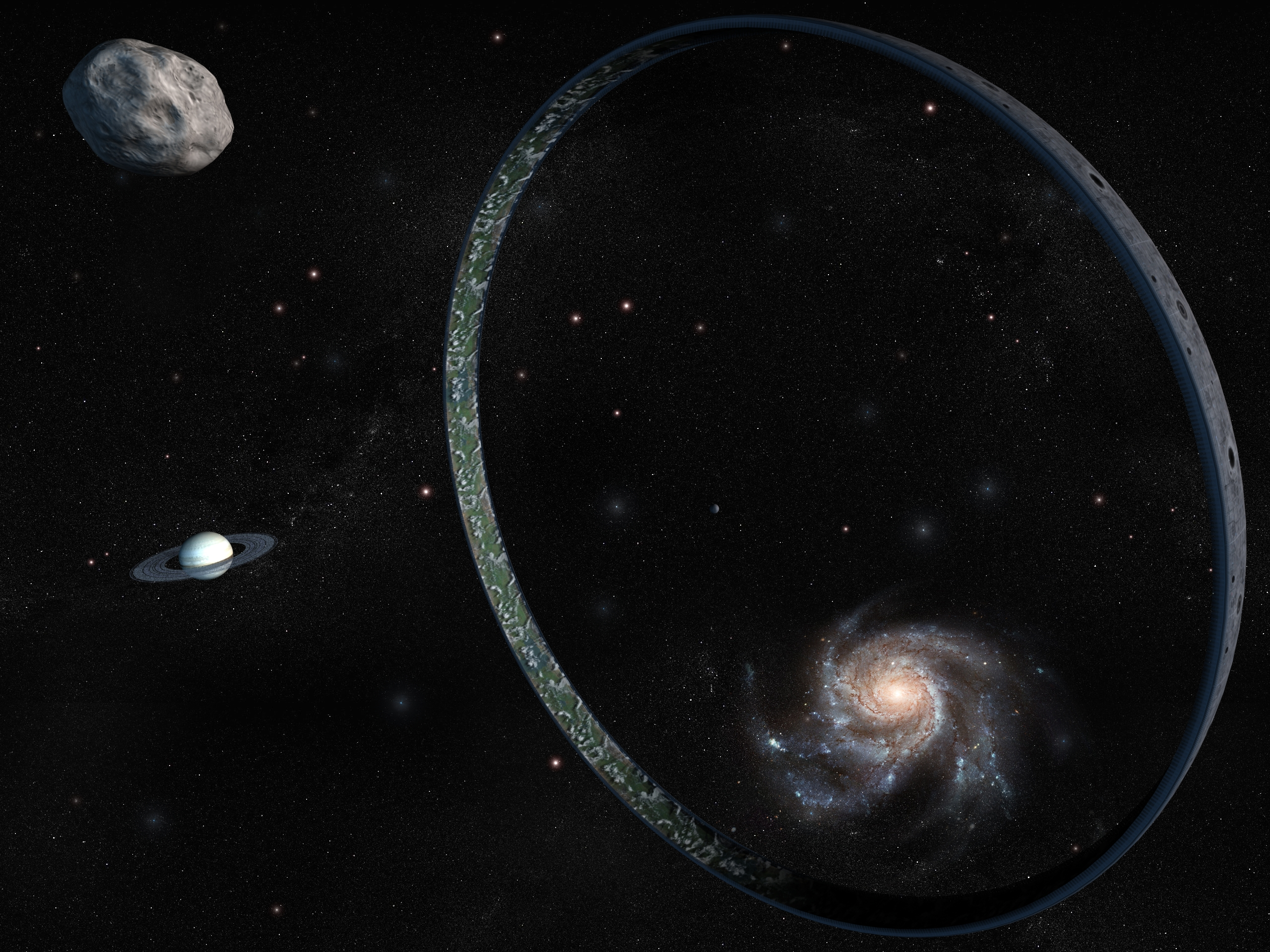
Artist's impression of an Orbital from the Culture setting.

One of the main types of habitats of the Culture, an orbital is a ring structure orbiting a star as would a megastructure akin to a bigger Bishop ring. Unlike a ringworld or a Dyson sphere, an orbital does not enclose the star (being much too small). Like a ringworld, the orbital rotates to provide an analog of gravity on the inner surface. A Culture orbital rotates about once every 24 hours and has gravity-like effect about the same as the gravity of Earth, making the diameter of the ring about 3,700,000 kilometres (2,300,000 mi) (nearly five times the diameter of the Moon's orbit around Earth), and ensuring that the inhabitants experience night and day. Orbitals feature prominently in many Culture stories.

=== Planets ===
Though many other civilisations in the Culture books live on planets, the Culture as currently developed has little direct connection to on-planet existence. Banks has written that he presumes this to be an inherent consequence of space colonisation, and a foundation of the liberal nature of the Culture. A small number of home worlds of the founding member-species of the Culture receive a mention in passing, and a few hundred human-habitable worlds were colonised (some of them terraformed) before the Culture elected to turn towards artificial habitats, preferring to keep the planets it encounters wild. Since then, the Culture has come to look down on terraforming as inelegant, ecologically problematic and possibly even immoral. Less than one per cent of the population of the Culture lives on planets, and many find the very concept somewhat bizarre.

This attitude is not absolute though; in Consider Phlebas, some Minds suggest testing a new technology on a "spare planet" (knowing that it could be destroyed in an antimatter explosion if unsuccessful). One could assume – from Minds' usual ethics – that such a planet would have been lifeless to start with. It is also quite possible, even probable, that the suggestion was not made in complete seriousness.

=== Rings ===
Ringworld-like megastructures exist in the Culture universe; the texts refer to them simply as "Rings" (with a capital R). As opposed to the smaller orbitals which revolve around a star, these structures are massive and completely encircle a star. Banks does not describe these habitats in detail, but records one as having been destroyed (along with three Spheres) in the Idiran-Culture war. In Matter, the Morthanveld people possesses ringworld-like structures made of innumerable various-sized tubes. Those structures, like Niven's Ringworld, encircle a star and are about the same size.

=== Rocks ===
These are asteroids and other non-planetary bodies hollowed out for habitation and usually spun for centrifugal artificial gravity. Rocks (with the exception of those used for secretive purposes) are described as having faster-than-light space drives, and thus can be considered a special form of spaceship. Like Orbitals, they are usually administered by one or more Minds.

Rocks do not play a large part in most of the Culture stories, though their use as storage for mothballed military ships (Pittance) and habitats (Phage Rock, one of the founding communities of the Culture) are both key plot points in Excession.

=== Shellworlds ===
Shellworlds are introduced in Matter, and consist of multilayered levels of concentric spheres in four dimensions held up by countless titanic interior towers. Their extra dimensional characteristics render some products of Culture technology too dangerous to use and yet others ineffective, notably access to hyperspace. About 4000 were built millions of years ago as vast machines intended to cast a forcefield around the whole of the galaxy for unknown purposes; less than half of those remain at the time of Matter, many having been destroyed by a departed species known as the Iln. The species that developed this technology, known as the Veil or the Involucra, are now lost, and many of the remaining shellworlds have become inhabited, often by many different species throughout their varying levels. Many still hold deadly secret defence mechanisms, often leading to great danger for their new inhabitants, giving them one of their other nicknames: Slaughter Worlds.

=== Ships ===
Ships in the Culture are intelligent individuals, often of very large size, controlled by one or more Minds. The ship is considered by the Culture generally and the Mind itself to be the Mind's body (compare avatars). Some ships (GSVs, for example) are tens or even hundreds of kilometres in length and may have millions or even billions of residents who live on them full-time; together with Orbitals, such ships represent the main form of habitat for the Culture. Such large ships may temporarily contain smaller ships with their own populations, and/or manufacture such ships themselves.

In Use of Weapons, the protagonist Zakalwe is allowed to acclimatise himself to the Culture by wandering for days through the habitable levels of a ship (the GSV Size Isn't Everything, which is described as over 80 kilometres (50 mi) long), eating and sleeping at the many locations which provide food and accommodation throughout the structure and enjoying the various forms of contact possible with the friendly and accommodating inhabitants.

=== Spheres ===
Dyson spheres also exist in the Culture universe but receive only passing mention as "Spheres". Three spheres are recorded as having been destroyed in the Idiran-Culture war.

== Interaction with other civilisations ==
The Culture, living mostly on massive spaceships and in artificial habitats, and also feeling no need for conquest in the typical sense of the word, possesses no borders. Its sphere of influence is better defined by the (current) concentration of Culture ships and habitats as well as the measure of effect its example and its interventions have already had on the "local" population of any galactic sector. As the Culture is also a very graduated and constantly evolving society, its societal boundaries are also constantly in flux (though they tend to be continually expanding during the novels), peacefully "absorbing" societies and individuals.

While the Culture is one of the most advanced and most powerful of all galactic civilisations, it is still but one of the "high-level Involved" (called "Optimae" by some less advanced civilisations), the most powerful non-sublimed civilisations which mentor or control the others.

An Involved society is a highly advanced group that has achieved galaxy-wide involvement with other cultures or societies. There are a few dozen Involved societies and hundreds or thousands of well-developed (interstellar) but insufficiently influential societies or cultures. The well-developed societies which do not take a dynamic role in the galaxy as a whole are designated as "galactically mature". In the novels, the Culture might be considered the premier Involved society, or at least the most dynamic and energetic, especially given that the Culture itself is a growing multicultural fusion of Involved societies.

The Involved are contrasted with the Sublimed, groups that have reached a high level of technical development and galactic influence but subsequently abandoned physical reality, ceasing to take serious interventionist interest in galactic civilisation. They are also contrasted with what some Culture people loosely refer to as "barbarians", societies of intelligent beings which lack the technical capacity to know about or take a serious role in their interstellar neighbourhood. There are also the elder civilisations, which are civilisations that reached the required level of technology for sublimation, but chose not to, and have retreated from the larger galactic meta-civilisation.

The Involved are also contrasted with hegemonising swarms (a term used in several of Banks' Culture novels). These are entities that exist to convert as much of the universe as possible into more of themselves; most typically these are technological in nature, resembling more sophisticated forms of grey goo, but the term can be applied to cultures that are sufficiently single-minded in their devotion to mass conquest, control, and colonisation. Both the Culture and the author (in his Notes on the Culture) find this behaviour quixotic and ridiculous. Most often, societies categorised as hegemonising swarms consist of species or groups newly arrived in the galactic community with highly expansionary and exploitative goals. The usage of the term "hegemonising swarm" in this context is considered derisive in the Culture and among other Involved and is used to indicate their low regard for those with these ambitions by comparing their behaviour to that of mindless self-replicating technology. The Culture's central moral dilemma regarding intervention in other societies can be construed as a conflict between the desire to help others and the desire to avoid becoming a hegemonising swarm themselves.

=== Foreign policy ===
Although they lead a comfortable life within the Culture, many of its citizens feel a need to be useful and to belong to a society that does not merely exist for their own sake but that also helps improve the lot of sentient beings throughout the galaxy. For that reason the Culture carries out "good works", covertly or overtly interfering in the development of lesser civilisations, with the main aim to gradually guide them towards less damaging paths. As Culture citizens see it, these good works provide the Culture with a "moral right to exist".

A group within the Culture, known as Contact, is responsible for its interactions (diplomatic or otherwise) with other civilisations. Non-Contact citizens are apparently not prevented from travelling or interacting with other civilisations, though the effort and potential danger involved in doing so alone makes it much more commonly the case for Culture people simply to join Contact if they long to "see the world". Further within Contact, an intelligence organisation named Special Circumstances exists to deal with interventions which require more covert behaviour; the interventionist approach that the Culture takes to advancing other societies may often create resentment in the affected civilisations and thus requires a rather delicate touch (see: Look to Windward).

In Matter, it is described that there are a number of other galactic civilisations that come close to or potentially even surpass the Culture in power and sophistication. The Culture is very careful and considerate of these groupings, and while still trying to convince them of the Culture ideal, will be much less likely to openly interfere in their activities.

In Surface Detail, three more branches of Contact are described: Quietus, the Quietudinal Service, whose purview is dealing with those entities who have retired from biological existence into digital form and/or those who have died and been resurrected; Numina, which is described as having the charge of contact with races that have sublimed; and Restoria, a subset of Contact which focuses on containing and negating the threat of swarms of self-replicating creatures ("hegswarms").

=== Behaviour in war ===
While the Culture is normally pacifist, Contact historically acts as its military arm in times of war and Special Circumstances can be considered its secret service and its military intelligence. During war, most of the strategic and tactical decisions are taken by the Minds, with apparently only a small number of especially gifted humans, the "Referrers", being involved in the top-level decisions, though they are not shown outside Consider Phlebas. It is shown in Consider Phlebas that actual decisions to go to war (as opposed to purely defensive actions) are based on a vote of all Culture citizens, presumably after vigorous discussion within the whole society.

It is described in various novels that the Culture is extremely reluctant to go to war, though it may start to prepare for it long before its actual commencement. In the Idiran-Culture War (possibly one of the most hard-fought wars for the normally extremely superior Culture forces), various star systems, stellar regions and many orbital habitats were overrun by the Idirans before the Culture had converted enough of its forces to military footing. The Culture Minds had had enough foresight to evacuate almost all its affected citizens (apparently numbering in the many billions) in time before actual hostilities reached them. As shown in Player of Games, this is a standard Culture tactic, with its strong emphasis on protecting its citizens rather than sacrificing some of them for short-term goals.

War within the Culture is mostly fought by the Culture's sentient warships, the most powerful of these being war-converted GSVs, which are described as powerful enough to oppose whole enemy fleets. The Culture has little use for conventional ground forces (as it rarely occupies enemy territory); combat drones equipped with knife missiles do appear in Descendant and "terror weapons" (basically intelligent, nano-form assassins) are mentioned in Look to Windward, while infantry combat suits of great power (also usable as capable combat drones when without living occupants) are used in Matter.

== Relevance to real-world politics ==
The inner workings of The Culture are not especially described in detail though it is shown that the society is populated by an empowered, educated and augmented citizenry in a direct democracy or highly democratic and transparent system of self-governance. In comparisons to the real world, intended or not, the Culture could resemble various posited egalitarian societies including in the writings of Karl Marx, the end condition of communism after a withering away of the state, the anarchism of Bakunin and Fourier et al., libertarian socialism, council communism and anarcho-communism. Other characteristics of The Culture that are recognisable in real world politics include pacifism, post-capitalism, and transhumanism. Banks deliberately portrayed an imperfect utopia whose imperfection or weakness is related to its interaction with the 'other', that is, exterior civilisations and species that are sometimes variously warred with or mishandled through the Culture's Contact section which cannot always control its intrigues and the individuals it either 'employs' or interacts with. This 'dark side' of The Culture also alludes to or echoes mistakes and tragedies in 20th century Marxist–Leninist countries, although the Culture is generally portrayed as far more 'humane' and just.

=== Utopia ===
Comparisons are often made between the Culture and twentieth and twenty-first century Western civilisation and nation-states, particularly their interventions in less-developed societies. These are often confused with regard to the author's assumed politics.

Ben Collier has said that the Culture is a utopia carrying significantly greater moral legitimacy than the West's, by comparison, proto-democracies. While Culture interventions can seem similar at first to Western interventions, especially when considered with their democratising rhetoric, the argument is that the Culture operates completely without material need, and therefore without the possibility of baser motives. This is not to say that the Culture's motives are purely altruistic; a peaceful, enlightened universe full of good neighbours lacking ethnic, religious, and sexual chauvinisms is in the Culture's interest as well. Furthermore, the Culture's ideals, in many ways similar to those of the liberal perspective today, are to a much larger extent realised internally in comparison to the West.

=== Criticism ===
Examples are the use of mercenaries to perform the work that the Culture does not want to get their hands dirty with, and even outright threats of invasion (the Culture has issued ultimatums to other civilisations before). Some commentators have also argued that those Special Circumstances agents tasked with civilising foreign cultures (and thus potentially also changing them into a blander, more Culture-like state) are also those most likely to regret these changes, with parallels drawn to real-world special forces trained to operate within the cultural mindsets of foreign nations.

The events of Use of Weapons are an example of just how dirty Special Circumstances will play in order to get their way and the conspiracy at the heart of the plot of Excession demonstrates how at least some Minds are prepared to risk killing sentient beings when they conclude that these actions are beneficial for the long term good. Special Circumstances represents a very small fraction of Contact, which itself is only a small fraction of the entire Culture, making it comparable again to size and influence of modern intelligence agencies.

== Issues raised ==
The Culture stories are largely about problems and paradoxes that confront liberal societies. The Culture itself is an "ideal-typical" liberal society; that is, as pure an example as one can reasonably imagine. It is highly egalitarian; the liberty of the individual is its most important value; and all actions and decisions are expected to be determined according to a standard of reasonability and sociability inculcated into all people through a progressive system of education. It is a society so beyond material scarcity that for almost all practical purposes its people can have and do what they want. If they do not like the behaviour or opinions of others, they can easily move to a more congenial Culture population centre (or Culture subgroup), and hence there is little need to enforce codes of behaviour.

Even the Culture has to compromise its ideals where diplomacy and its own security are concerned. Contact, the group that handles these issues, and Special Circumstances, its secret service division, can employ only those on whose talents and emotional stability it can rely, and may even reject self-aware drones built for its purposes that fail to meet its requirements. Hence these divisions are regarded as the Culture's elite and membership is widely regarded as a prize; yet also something that can be shameful as it contradicts many of the Culture's moral codes.

Within Contact and Special Circumstances, there are also inner circles that can take control in crises, somewhat contradictory to the ideal notions of democratic and open process the Culture espouses. Contact and Special Circumstances may suppress or delay the release of information, for example to avoid creating public pressure for actions they consider imprudent or to prevent other civilisations from exploiting certain situations.

In dealing with less powerful regressive civilisations, the Culture usually intervenes discreetly, for example by protecting and discreetly supporting the more liberal elements, or subverting illiberal institutions. For instance, in Use of Weapons, the Culture operates within a less advanced illiberal society through control of a business cartel which is known for its humanitarian and social development investments, as well as generic good Samaritanism. In Excession, a sub-group of Minds conspires to provoke a war with the extremely sadistic Affront, although the conspiracy is foiled by a GSV that is a deep cover Special Circumstances agent. Only one story, Consider Phlebas, pits the Culture against a highly illiberal society of approximately equal power: the aggressive, theocratic Idirans. Though they posed no immediate, direct threat to the Culture, the Culture declared war because it would have felt useless if it allowed the Idirans' ruthless expansion to continue. The Culture's decision was a value-judgement rather than a utilitarian calculation, and the "Peace Faction" within the Culture seceded. Later in the timeline of the Culture's universe, the Culture has reached a technological level at which most past civilisations have Sublimed, in other words disengaged from Galactic politics and from most physical interaction with other civilisations. The Culture continues to behave "like an idealistic adolescent".

As of 2008, three stories force the Culture to consider its approach to more powerful civilisations. In one incident during the Culture–Idiran War, they strive to avoid offending a civilisation so advanced that it has disengaged from Galactic politics, and note that this hyper-advanced society is not a threat to either the welfare or the values of the Culture. In Excession, an overwhelmingly more powerful individual from an extremely advanced civilisation is simply passing through on its way from one plane of the physical Reality to another, and there is no real interaction. In the third case it sets up teams to study a civilisation that is not threatening but is thought to have eliminated aggressors in the past.

== List of books describing the Culture ==
The Culture series comprises nine novels, one novella, and two short stories ordered by publication date:

Title	First published	Date of setting	ISBN
Consider Phlebas	April 1987	1331 CE (Note: Early in the book it is stated that the war has been going on for four years, while the historical appendix states that the war began in 1327 CE. (Banks 1987, p. 467, A Short History of the Idiran War); the book ends with a historical account of the war dated to 2110)	1-85723-138-4
An episode in a full-scale war between the Culture and the Idirans, told mainly from the point of view of an operative of the Idiran Empire.
A Gift from the Culture	June 1987	?	
A man in self-imposed exile from the Culture is pressured into committing an act of terrorism with the help of Culture technology. A short story first published in Interzone #20 in 1987, later collected in Banks's 1991 short story collection The State of the Art.
Descendant	August 1987	?	1-85286-004-9
A soldier and his sapient spacesuit struggle to survive after being shot down and crash-landing on a barren planet. A short story first published in the anthology Tales from the Forbidden Planet, edited by Roz Kaveney, later collected in Banks's 1991 short story collection The State of the Art.
The Player of Games	1988	c. 2083 to 2087/88 CE (Note: The ship Limiting Factor was "constructed seven hundred and sixteen years earlier in the closing stages of the Idiran war, when the conflict in space was almost over".(Banks 1988) The war in space ended in 1367. The events of the book take place over a period of four to five years from the time of this statement.)	1-85723-146-5
A bored member of the Culture is blackmailed into being the Culture's agent in a plan to subvert a brutal, hierarchical empire. His mission is to win an empire-wide tournament by which the ruler of the empire is selected.
The State of the Art	1989	1977 CE	0-929480-06-6
A Culture group investigate Earth in the 1970s, considering it for contact. A novella first published on its own, later collected in Banks's 1991 short story collection named after it.
Use of Weapons	1990	2092 CE (Note: the events of the book are almost simultaneous with Diziet Sma's writing an account of her visit to Earth in 1977. In her preface to this account in "The State of the Art", she dates the visit to 115 years earlier.) main narrative. 1892 CE (Note: At the end of the main narrative stream, Zakalwe says it has been two centuries since the battleship was taken.) start of secondary narrative.	0-356-19160-5
Chapters describing the current mission of a Culture special agent born and raised on a non-Culture planet alternate with chapters that describe in reverse chronological order earlier missions and the traumatic events that made him who he is.
Excession	1996	c. 1867 CE (Note: The Gray Area reflects, "Nothing like this had been seen in the galaxy since the worst days of the Idiran war five hundred years earlier, and even then not remotely on such a scale." (Banks 1996, p. 463)) main setting. c. 1827 CE (Note: Dated by Dajeil's "forty-year pregnancy". (Banks 1996, p. 9)) and c. 633 BCE (Note: "two and a half thousand years ago… the Problem Child…chanced upon the ember of a very old star" where it found "A perfect black-body sphere fifty klicks across, in orbit around the unfeasibly ancient star." (Banks 1996, pp. 70–73)) flashbacks.	1-85723-394-8
An alien artifact far advanced beyond the Culture's understanding is used by one group of Minds to lure a civilisation (the behaviour of which they disapprove) into war; another group of Minds works against the conspiracy. A sub-plot covers how two humanoids make up their differences after traumatic events that happened 40 years earlier.
Inversions	1998	Unspecified	1-85723-763-3
Not explicitly a Culture novel, but recounts what appear to be the activities of a Special Circumstances agent and a Culture emigrant on a planet whose development is roughly equivalent to that of medieval Europe. The interwoven stories are told from the viewpoint of several of the locals.
Look to Windward	2000	c. 2167 CE (Note: "The war had ended nearly eight hundred years ago and life had gone on." (Banks 2000, p. 29))	1-85723-969-5
The Culture has interfered in the development of a race known as the Chelgrians, with disastrous consequences. Now, in the light of a star that was destroyed 800 years previously during the Idiran War, plans for revenge are being hatched.
Matter	2008	c. 1887 or 2167 CE (Note: The book refers to the Sleeper Service incident in Excession as occurring 20 years previously; however, it also says that the Liveware Problem has been wandering for 800 years, having begun at the end of its service in the Idiran War.)	1-84149-417-8
A Culture special agent who is a princess of an early-industrial society on a huge artificial planet learns that her father and brother have been killed and decides to return to her homeworld. When she returns, she finds a far deeper threat.
Surface Detail	2010	sometime between 2767 (Note: The book states that the events of Look to Windward occurred about 600 years earlier ("However, as part of what were in effect war reparations after the Chel debacle, six hundred years ago..."), and repeatedly refers to the Idiran war as occurring about 1500 years earlier; the war formally ended in 1375.) and c. 2967 CE (Note: Banks in an interview stated, "This one takes place about eight hundred years later on in the chronology of the culture"; at the time he was speaking the latest book in the culture chronology was set around 2167 (Parsons 2010))	1-84149-893-9
A young woman seeks revenge on her murderer after being brought back to life by Culture technology. Meanwhile, a war over the digitized souls of the dead is expanding from cyberspace into the real world.
The Hydrogen Sonata	2012	c. 2375 CE (Note: The book states that the Interesting Times Gang from Excession has not been seen in almost 500 years; also, that it is about 1000 years after the Idiran war.)	978-0356501505
In the last days of the Gzilt civilisation, which is about to Sublime, a secret from far back in their history threatens to unravel their plans. Aided by a number of Culture vessels and their avatars, one of the Gzilt tries to discover if much of their history was actually a lie.

== Banks on the Culture ==
When asked in Wired magazine (June 1996) whether mankind's fate depends on having intelligent machines running things, as in the Culture, Banks replied:

Not entirely, no. I think the first point to make about the Culture is, I'm just making it up as I go along. It doesn't exist and I don't delude myself that it does. It's just my take on it. I'm not convinced that humanity is capable of becoming the Culture because I think people in the Culture are just too nice – altering their genetic inheritance to make themselves relatively sane and rational and not the genocidal, murdering bastards that we seem to be half the time.

But I don't think you have to have a society like the Culture in order for people to live. The Culture is a self-consciously stable and long-lived society that wants to go on living for thousands of years. Lots of other civilisations within the same universe hit the Culture's technological level and even the actuality of the Culture's utopia, but it doesn't last very long – that's the difference.

The point is, humanity can find its own salvation. It doesn't necessarily have to rely on machines. It'll be a bit sad if we did, if it's our only real form of progress. Nevertheless, unless there's some form of catastrophe, we are going to use machines whether we like it or not. This sort of stuff has been going on for decades and mainstream society is beginning to catch up to the implications of artificial intelligence.

In a 2002 interview with Science Fiction Weekly magazine, when asked:

Excession is particularly popular because of its copious detail concerning the Ships and Minds of the Culture, its great AIs: their outrageous names, their dangerous senses of humour. Is this what gods would actually be like?

Banks replied:

If we're lucky.

== Bibliography ==
=== Primary Sources ===
- Banks, Iain M. (1987), Consider Phlebas, Orbit, ISBN 1-85723-138-4.
- Banks, Iain M. (1988), The Player of Games, Orbit, ISBN 1-85723-146-5.
- Banks, Iain M. (1990), Use of Weapons, Orbit, ISBN 9780356191607.
- Banks, Iain M. (1991). The State of the Art. Orbit. ISBN 0-356-19669-0..
- Banks, Iain M. (10 August 1994). "A Few Notes on the Culture". Newsgroup: rec.arts.sf.written..
- Banks, Iain M. (1996), Excession, Orbit, ISBN 1-85723-457-X.
- Banks, Iain M. (1998), Inversions, Orbit, ISBN 1-85723-763-3.
- Banks, Iain M. (2000), Look to Windward, Orbit, ISBN 1-85723-969-5.
- Banks, Iain M. (2008), Matter, Orbit, ISBN 978-1-84149-417-3.
- Banks, Iain M. (2010), Surface Detail, Orbit, p. 400, ISBN 978-1-84149-893-5.
- Banks, Iain M. (2012), The Hydrogen Sonata, Orbit, ISBN 978-0356501505.
- Banks, Iain M. (n.d.), "A few Notes on Marain", Trevor Hopkins Homepage.

=== Secondary Sources ===
- Blackmore, Tim (2010), "Save Now [Y/N]? Machine Memory at War in Iain M. Banks' Look to Windward", Bulletin of Science, Technology & Society, 30 (4): 259–273, doi:10.1177/0270467610373816, ISSN 0270-4676, S2CID 144415805
- Brown, Chris (2001), "'Special Circumstances': Intervention by a Liberal Utopia", Millennium – Journal of International Studies, 30 (3): 625–626, doi:10.1177/03058298010300031601, S2CID 143328512.
- Horwich, David (21 January 2002), "Culture Clash: Ambivalent Heroes and the Ambiguous Utopia in the Work of Iain M. Banks", Strange Horizons.
- Jackson, Patrick Thaddeus; Heilman, James (2008), "Outside Context Problems: Liberalism and the Other in the Work of Iain M.Banks", in Hassler, D.M.; Wilcox, C. (eds.), New Boundaries in Political Science Fiction, University of South Carolina Press, pp. 235–258, ISBN 978-1-57003-736-8.
- Lippens, Ronnie (2002), "Imachinations of Peace: Scientifictions of Peace in Iain M. Banks's The Player of Games", Utopian Studies, 13 (1): 135–147, ISSN 1045-991X, OCLC 5542757341.
- Newitz, Annalee (2019), The future of another timeline, Little, Brown Book Group Limited, ISBN 978-0-356-51123-8, OCLC 1059268855.
- Norman, Joseph S. (2021), The Culture of "The Culture": Utopian Processes in Iain M. Banks's Space Opera Series, Oxford University Press, ISBN 978-1-78962-174-7, OCLC 1120943463.
- Rumpala, Yannick (2012), "Artificial intelligences and political organization: An exploration based on the science fiction work of Iain M. Banks", Technology in Society, 34 (1): 23–32, doi:10.1016/j.techsoc.2011.12.005, ISSN 0160-791X.
- Westfahl, Gary (2006), Space and beyond: the frontier theme in science fiction, Westport, Conn.; London: Greenwood Press, ISBN 978-0-313-30846-8, OCLC 751416745

=== Interviews and Reviews ===
- Horton, Richard (5 March 1997), Use of Weapons: Review, archived from the original on 28 January 2017.
- Johnson, Greg L. (2008), "Matter (review)", SF Site, archived from the original on 4 June 2008.
- Langford, David (1998), "Iain M. Banks: Inversions", Ansible.uk.
- Parsons, Michael (14 October 2010), "Interview: Iain M Banks talks 'Surface Detail' with Wired", Wired.

=== News Sources ===
- Collier, Ben (18 July 2013), Becoming More Like The Culture, No. 1: Economics (v0.1), archived from the original on 22 July 2013
- Cross, Tim (31 March 2017), "The novelist who inspired Elon Musk", The Economist, archived from the original on 21 May 2017.
- Newitz, Annalee (27 March 2017), "Elon Musk is setting up a company that will link brains and computers", Ars Technica.
