= Planke =

Planke is a surname. Notable people with the surname include:

- Petter Planke (1937–2026), Norwegian businessperson;
- Tore Planke (born 1943), Norwegian engineer, inventor, and businessperson.

== See also ==
- Planck (disambiguation)
- Plunk (surname)
