= Plunk =

Belgian comic book series

- Cover to the first issue
- Author(s): Luc Cromheecke; Laurent Letzer
- Launch date: 2000
- End date: 2017
- Publisher: Dupuis
- Genre: Humor comics

For people with the surname, see Plunk (surname).

Plunk is a Belgian comic series created by Luc Cromheecke and Laurent Letzer, and published by Dupuis. So far three albums have appeared.

The comics are pantomime comic/gag-a-day short stories (most often between one and four pages long) about the misadventures of Plunk, a little pink alien with green trousers and a green hat from the planet Smurk.

== History ==
Plunk was first created in the late 1980s for the Belgian Centre for Comic Strip Art as a fictional example of the merchandising that can be produced with successful comic figures like The Smurfs or Peanuts. In 1990, he became a character in Taco Zip, the comic strip by Cromheecke which appeared at the time in the Dutch newspaper De Volkskrant. These comic strips were later reprinted in four albums and twenty years later in one collection.

A decade later, Plunk became the central figure in a series of very short animated movies, commissioned by VTM, the major Flemish commercial TV station. The plan abandoned before any of these shorts were ever broadcast though.

In 2007, Plunk was again revived, this time to get his own series. The Plunk stories are prepublished in Spirou magazine (French language), in Gazet van Antwerpen and Het Belang van Limburg (Dutch language), and sometimes on the Plunk-blog maintained by Cromheecke.

The first two albums of Plunk were nominated at the Stripschapprizes (the major comics awards in the Netherlands) for the Award for Best Dutch Language Youth Comic in 2007 and 2008.

Since 2008, Plunk is the mascotte of the award for the best Dutch language short comic story, the Plastieken Plunk, awarded by the comics magazines Plots and Pulp Deluxe. From 2004 until 2007 this award was given by Pulp Deluxe alone, but it was renamed after Plots joined.

== Plastieken Plunk winners ==
- 2004: Steven Dupré
- 2005: Brecht Evens
- 2006: Filip Strubbe and Ivan Claeys
- 2007: Kristof Spaey and Steven Dupré
- 2008: Pinda
- 2009: Brecht Evens
- 2010: Erwin Kho
- 2011: Frederik Van Den Stock
- 2012: Martijn Van Santen
- 2013: Leslie Saurus
- 2014: Thijs Desmet
- 2015: Jan van Doornspeek
- 2016: Jonas Sysmans

=== Plastieken Plunk audience award ===
- 2008: Swahili and Peter Moerenhout
- 2009: Pieter Rosseel and Peter Moerenhout
- 2010: Bartosz Sztybor and others
- 2011: Merel Cremers
- 2012: Mathias van den Berge en Bram Vaassen
- 2013: Jeroen Funke
- 2014: Bram Algoed
- 2015: Floris De Smedt
- 2016: Dennis Marien
