= Plunk (surname) =

Plunk is a surname. Notable people with the surname include:

- Bob Plunk (1931-2013), American politician
- Eric Plunk (born 1963), American baseball player

== See also ==
- Planke, another surname
