= One Door Away from Heaven =

2001 novel by Dean Koontz

- First US edition
- Author: Dean Koontz
- Cover artist: Tom Hallman
- Language: English
- Genre: Suspense, Horror novel
- Publisher: Bantam Books
- Publication date: 2001
- Publication place: United States
- Media type: Print
- Pages: 606
- ISBN: 0-553-80137-6
- OCLC: 50862952

One Door Away From Heaven is a horror novel by the best-selling author Dean Koontz, released in 2001.

== Plot summary ==
A shape-changing alien has come to Earth with others of his kind to save us from ourselves. After witnessing the slaughter of his entire family by evil aliens bent on stopping him, he takes off on a cross-country race to save himself. He stops at a farmhouse in the middle of the night to "borrow" some money and clothes, and comes across a sleeping boy about his age. Using a drop of blood from an old bandage, he is able to "become" Curtis Hammond, the exact duplicate of the boy. Seconds after leaving the house, the evil aliens arrive and murder the family, leaving only the dog alive. Curtis and the dog escape, and eventually end up at the location of an alien sighting. UFO buffs Castoria and Polluxia Spelkenfelter, twins, recognize Curtis from the news reports of his murder and decide to help him. Eventually he reveals to them his true nature, and they pledge to assist him in the mission he has come to Earth to complete. Together, twins, boy, and dog set off for Nun's Lake, Idaho, the next stop on the twins' itinerary while they decide what to do next.

Michelina (Mickey) Bellsong just got out of prison. She has moved in with her Aunt Geneva in order to make a new start, but things aren't going her way. She feels adrift and without direction, just wanting to get through the day. While sunning in the backyard, she is approached by a precocious but disabled little girl. Leilani Klonk has a deformed hand and a deformed leg, which requires a brace. She is more intelligent and articulate than the average nine-year-old, and disarms Mickey with her wit. Mickey and Geneva get to know the girl, and find out that her mother is an insane drug addict, and her step-father is a murderer. He killed her older brother Lukipela, and Leilani is next. Leilani believes that no one can help her, as Preston Maddoc is highly thought of by the academic community. Preston and Sinsemilla, Leilani's mother, bounce across the country looking for UFOs and Leilani knows it's only a matter of time before they bounce back to Montana, which is where Preston murdered her brother Lukipela. Mickey and Geneva vow to find a way to help Leilani, but Preston finds out and takes off with the family in the dead of night. Mickey discovers them gone and sets out after them, determined to save Leilani. Leilani has mentioned that they are headed to Nun's Lake, Idaho to the site of a supposed close encounter and Mickey races to reach the town and find the girl. Mickey arrives and goes to speak to the man who was "healed" by aliens, and finds out that Leilani's step-father hasn't been there yet. She stakes out the house, wanting to find Preston and follow him to Leilani. Preston is alerted to her presence by the man who was healed, who he then murders. He sneaks out of the house and creeps up on Mickey, knocking her unconscious. He carries her into the dead man's house and ties her up, leaving her there and racing back to the campground.

Curtis encounters Leilani at the campground in Nun's Lake and knows she's in trouble. He and the twins approach her while Preston's out and convince her to come with them. As they are running for the twins' RV, Leilani is snatched by her step-father and taken to the house he has hidden Mickey in. His plan is to make Leilani watch him kill Mickey, then torture and kill Leilani. When he gets back to the house, he discovers that Mickey has gotten free of her restraints. He dumps Leilani, takes her brace, and starts searching for Mickey in the maze of old magazines and newspapers. Leilani heads into the maze looking for a way out, and she and Mickey find each other. Preston traps them in a corner and lights the newspapers in front of them on fire, planning to listen as they burn to death. Curtis and the twins, now aided by a disillusioned ex-PI sent by Aunt Gen, arrive at the house. Noah Farrell, the PI, shoots Preston Maddoc as he races through the maze searching for Mickey and Leilani. Preston stumbles away, getting weaker and weaker from blood loss and smoke inhalation. Noah and Cass find Mickey and Leilani and the four of them search for an exit. Curtis, in his natural form, comes to their rescue, and they all escape the house. Preston Maddoc is buried under a pile of burning trash and dies.

Leilani, Mickey, Aunt Gen, and Noah join Cass and Polly in their quest to help Curtis fulfill the mission he's been sent here for.

At the core of the novel is the knowledge the alien boy brings to humanity. Every world that has sentient beings also has an equivalent for dogs. Creatures that can bond emotionally to people and who are physically aware of the presence of the Creator. Curtis and his race can bond telepathically to dogs and he is here to teach this gift to humanity
