= Luc Cromheecke =

Belgian comics artist

Luc Cromheecke (born 2 August 1961), is a Belgian comics artist best known for the comic series Tom Carbon, Taco Zip, Roboboy and Plunk.

== Biography ==
Luc Cromheecke was born in Antwerp in 1961. After having studied painting, graphic arts and publicity at the Royal Academy for Fine Arts of Antwerp, he created the magazine "Flan Imperial" with fellow student Fritzgerald; it featured material by Dutch artists René Windig and Eddie De Jong. The magazine didn't sell well despite a short review in Robbedoes, and folded after one issue.

In 1983 Cromheecke started the comic strip Taco Zip, which appeared in Robbedoes, De Volkskrant, and De Morgen. He creates in the next years the series Tom Carbon, which appeared in the Dutch magazine Sjors and again in Robbedoes. Both series had an initial run of 4 albums, and Tom Carbon was translated to French and German. In 1989, he was invited by the Comics Museum in Brussels to make the material for the displays about merchandising, for which he used a minor character from Taco Zip, the mad alien Plunk.

In the next years, Cromheecke made a number of short lived series and many illustrations for magazines and publicity campaigns. In 1994, he partook in an exposition of young talents at the Angoulême International Comics Festival with Lewis Trondheim and others. He also made a few CD-roms, and a short-lived series Ben le Forestier for the French magazine Astrapi, but in general scarcely participated in the comics scene.

In 2003, Cromheecke returned with Roboboy, a children's series about a robot child living with a normal family, and the havoc it unwillingly creates. Because of this renewed interest in his work, he started creating new stories for older series like Tom Carbon and Taco Zip. Together with Jean-Michel Thiriet, he created a weekly page in Spirou magazine. In 2006, he also created the spin-off series Plunk for Spirou, and published the first album of Ben de Boswachter. An exposition celebrating twenty years of Taco Zip debuted at Strip Turnhout in Turnhout, traveling to different cities in Belgium and the Netherlands, including the comic shop Lambiek in Amsterdam At the end of 2005, Cromheecke drew the cover for the last issue of Robbedoes magazine, which is also used for the last collection of Robbedoes magazines, album #262.

Cromheecke cites as his influences American comic strips like B.C. and Peanuts.

== Bibliography ==
- Ben de Boswachter, 1 album, 2006, story by Laurent Letzer: Bries
- Plunk, 3 albums, 2007-, story by Laurent Letzer: Dupuis
- Roboboy, 6 albums, 2003-, story by Willy Linthout: Dupuis, Mezzanine and Catullus
- Taco Zip, 4 albums, 1989–1993, and one anthology in 2005, stories by Fritzgerald and Jakketoe: Gezellig & Leuk, Oog & Blik and Beedee
- Tom Carbon, 7 albums, 1991-, story by Laurent Letzer and Fritzgerald: Dupuis, Beedee an Strip2000, translated in French (Tom Carbone) and German (Fritz Lakritz)

His comics have been translated in many languages, including French, German, Spanish, Danish, Indonesian. and Chinese.

== Awards ==
- 1992: nominated for the Award for a First Comic Book at the Angoulême International Comics Festival, France
- 1994: nominated for the Award for best foreign comic at the Angoulême International Comics Festival
- 2002: Best Author (Dutch language) at the Prix Saint-Michel, Brussels
- 2003: Best Youth Album (Dutch language) at the Prix Saint-Michel
- 2003: Best Youth Album (Dutch language) at the Stripdagen, Alphen aan den Rijn
- 2007: nominated for the Bronzen Adhemar, Turnhout
- 2007: nominated for the Award for Best Dutch Language Youth Comic at the Stripschapprizes
- 2008: nominated for the Award for Best Dutch Language Youth Comic at the Stripschapprizes
- 2010: nominated for the Award for Best Dutch Language Youth Comic at the Stripschapprizes for Roboboy 6

== Sources ==
- Béra, Michel; Denni, Michel; and Mellot, Philippe (1998): "Trésors de la Bande Dessinée 1999-2000". Paris, Les éditions de l'amateur. ISBN 978-2-85917-258-9
